= Davys =

Davys is a given name and a surname. Notable people with the name include:

Surname:

- Paul Davys, 1st Viscount Mount Cashell (1670–1716), Irish peer
- Ali Davys (born 1970), Irish rugby player
- Arthur Davys (died 1733), Irish politician
- George Davys (1780–1864), English cleric, tutor to Queen Victoria, and later Bishop of Peterborough
- John Davys (died 1689) (1646–1689), Irish politician
- Mary Davys (1674–1732), Irish novelist and playwright
- Michael Gwynne Douglas Davys (1922–2002), British psychiatrist who specialised in depression in children
- Owen Davys (1794–1875), Archdeacon of Northampton
- Paul Davys (1600–1672), Irish politician and civil servant
- William Davys (1633–1687), Irish barrister and judge, Recorder of Dublin, Prime Serjeant and Lord Chief Justice of Ireland

Given name:

- Thomas Reid Davys Bell (1863–1948), Irish lepidopterist, naturalist and forest officer in India
- John Davys Beresford (1873–1947), English writer remembered for science fiction, horror and ghost stories
- Ezekiel Davys Wilson (1738–1821), Irish politician

== See also ==
- Davies
- Davis (surname)
- Davis (given name)
- Dāvis
- Daviess (disambiguation)
