= Joe Davis (disambiguation) =

Joe Davis (1901–1978) was a British snooker and billiards player.

Joe Davis or Joseph Davis may also refer to:

== Politicians ==
- Joseph Davis (Orange County, NY), American politician, member of the New York state assembly in 1847 and 1859
- Joseph J. Davis (1828–1892), American politician, judge, and U.S. Representative from North Carolina from 1875 to 1881
- Joe W. Davis (1918–1992), American politician, mayor of Huntsville, Alabama from 1968 to 1988
- Joe Davis (politician) (1923–2021), American politician and judge, Florida state representative from 1962 to 1966
- Gray Davis (Joseph Graham Davis Jr., born 1942), American politician and attorney, governor of California from 1999 to 2003

== Sports ==
- Joe Davis (baseball), player in the 1939 St. Louis Cardinals season
- Joe Davis (baseball, born 1914), player in the 1941 St. Louis Cardinals season
- Joe Davis (basketball, born 1902) (1902–1990), coach of Clemson & Rice
- Joe Davis (basketball, born 1942), coach of Radford
- Joseph Davis (tennis), player in the 1947 U.S. National Championships – Men's Singles
- Joe Davis (end) (1919–1992), American football end
- Joe Davis (American football coach) (born c. 1980), American college football coach
- Joe Davis (footballer, born 1938) (1938–2018), English footballer (Bristol Rovers)
- Joe Davis (footballer, born 1941) (1941–2016), Scottish footballer (Hibernian)
- Joe Davis (footballer, born 1993), English footballer
- Joe Davis (sportscaster) (born 1987), American sportscaster

== Military ==
- Joseph R. Davis (1825–1896), Confederate States Army general
- Joseph Davis (Medal of Honor) (1838–1895), American soldier and Medal of Honor recipient
- Joseph H. Davis (Medal of Honor) (1860–1903), American sailor and Medal of Honor recipient

== Other people ==
- Joseph Davis (explorer) (died 1715), employee of Hudson's Bay Company in Canada
- Joseph Emory Davis (1784–1870), older brother of Jefferson Davis
- Joseph Barnard Davis (1801–1881), English medical doctor, collector and craniologist
- Joseph H. Davis (painter) (fl. 1830s), American portrait painter
- Joe Davis (music publisher) (1896–1978), American music publisher, producer and promoter
- Joe C. Davis Jr. (1919–1989), American businessman
- Joe Davis (artist) (born 1953), artist in residence at Massachusetts Institute of Technology, USA
- Joseph G. Davis (born 1953), Australian information systems researcher
- Joseph S. Davis (1885–1975), American economist
- Joe Davis (fl. 1990s), founder and owner of UK-based Brazilian music record label Far Out Recordings
- Joseph Davis (fl. 2000s), American rap artist defended in "United States v. Joseph Davis" by William Spade

== See also ==
- Joseph Davies (disambiguation)
- Jo Davis (disambiguation)
- Joe W. Davis Stadium, a stadium in Huntsville, built in 1985
- Joseph Davis State Park, New York State, US
