= Jo Daviess =

Jo Daviess may refer to:

- Jo Daviess County, Illinois, United States
- Jo Daviess Township, Faribault County, Minnesota, United States
- Joseph Hamilton Daveiss, American soldier and namesake of both the county and township

== See also ==
- Jo Davis (disambiguation)
- Joe Davies (disambiguation)
