= Daviess =

Daviess may refer to:

- Maria T. Daviess (1814–1896), American author
- Maria Thompson Daviess (1872–1924), American artist, author
- Hannah Daviess Pittman (1840–1919), American journalist; author of the first American comic opera
- Daviess County (disambiguation), several counties in the US
- Jo Daviess (disambiguation)

== See also ==
- Joseph Hamilton Daveiss (1774–1811), American lawyer and military commander
- Davies, a surname
