= John Rowan (Kentucky politician) =

American politician, Kentucky (1773–1843)

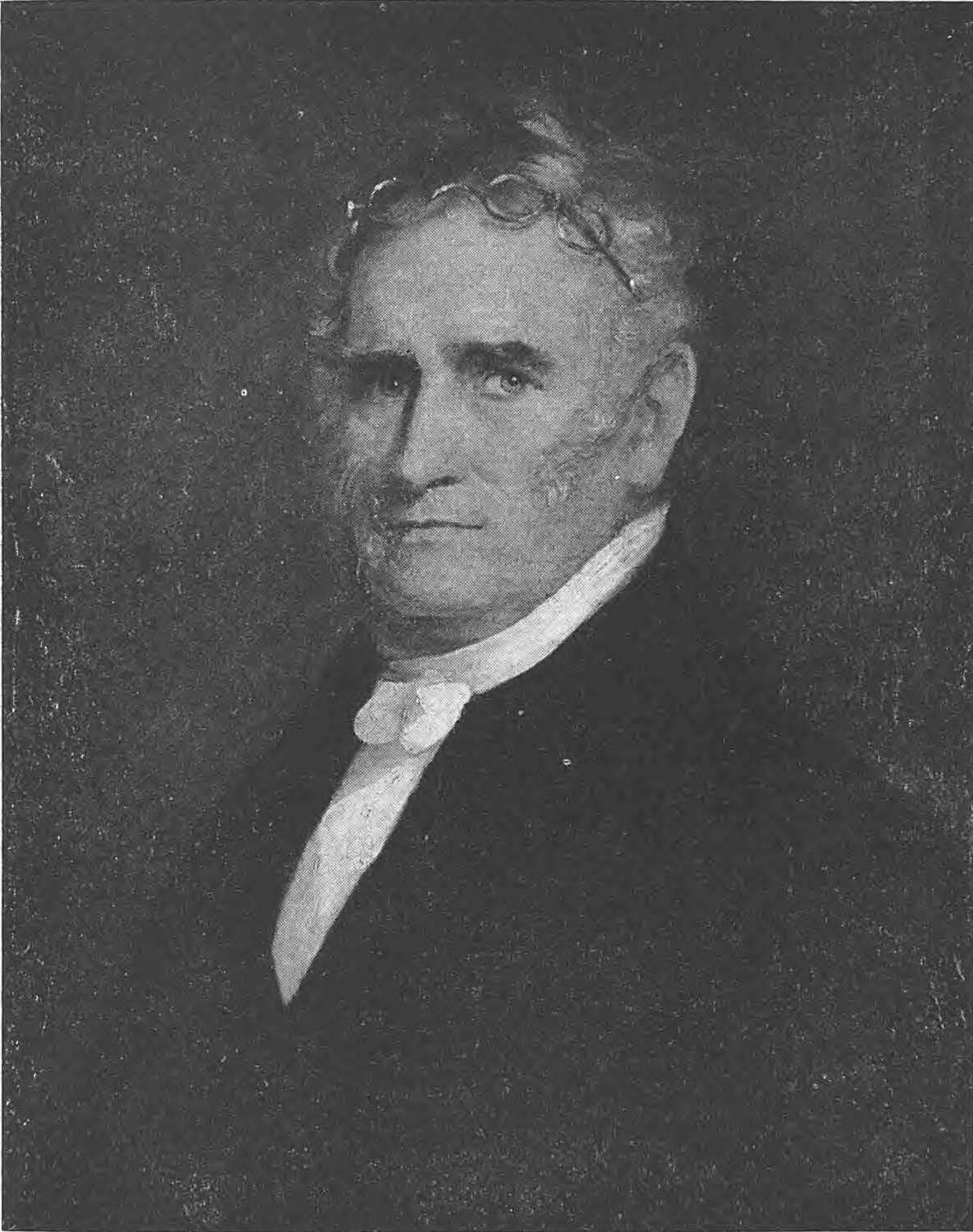
- Portrait by Matthew Harris Jouett

United States Senator from Kentucky
- In office March 4, 1825 – March 4, 1831
- Preceded by: Isham Talbot
- Succeeded by: Henry Clay

Member of the U.S. House of Representatives from Kentucky's 3rd district
- In office March 4, 1807 – March 3, 1809
- Preceded by: Matthew Walton
- Succeeded by: Henry Crist

3rd Secretary of State of Kentucky
- In office September 7, 1804 – March 1, 1807
- Governor: Christopher Greenup
- Preceded by: Harry Toulmin
- Succeeded by: Alfred W. Grayson

Member of the Kentucky House of Representatives
- In office 1813–1817; 1822; 1824

Personal details
- Born: July 12, 1773 York, Province of Pennsylvania, British America
- Died: July 13, 1843 (aged 70) Louisville, Kentucky, U.S.
- Party: Democratic-Republican, Jacksonian
- Spouse: Anne Lytle
- Relatives: Robert Todd Lytle (nephew)
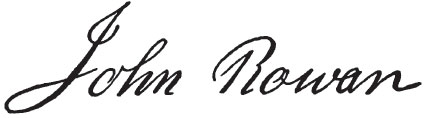
- Signature

John Rowan (July 12, 1773 – July 13, 1843) was a 19th-century politician and jurist from the U.S. state of Kentucky. Rowan's family moved from Pennsylvania to the Kentucky frontier when he was young. From there, they moved to Bardstown, Kentucky, where Rowan studied law with former Kentucky Attorney General George Nicholas. He was a representative to the state constitutional convention of 1799, but his promising political career was almost derailed when he killed a man in a duel stemming from a drunken dispute during a game of cards. Although public sentiment was against him, a judge found insufficient evidence against him to convict him of murder. In 1804, Governor Christopher Greenup appointed Rowan Secretary of State, and he went on to serve in the Kentucky House of Representatives and the U.S. House of Representatives.

In 1819, Rowan was appointed to the Kentucky Court of Appeals, serving until his resignation 1821. He was again elected to the state legislature in 1823. With the state reeling from the Panic of 1819, Rowan became the leader of a group of legislators dedicated to enacting laws favorable to the state's large debtor class. He believed the will of the people was sovereign and roundly denounced the Court of Appeals for striking down debt relief legislation as unconstitutional. He led the effort to impeach the offending justices, and when that effort failed, spearheaded a movement to abolish the court entirely and replace it with a new one, touching off the Old Court – New Court controversy. New Court partisans in the legislature elected Rowan to the U.S. Senate in 1824. During his term, the nascent Whig Party ascended to power in the state legislature, and at the expiration of his term in 1831, the Whigs replaced him with party founder Henry Clay.

After his term in the Senate, Rowan returned to Kentucky, where he served as the first president of the Louisville Medical Institute and the Kentucky Historical Society. In 1840, he was appointed to a commission to prosecute land claims of U.S. citizens against the Republic of Mexico, but resigned his commission in 1842 because of failing health. He died July 13, 1843, and was buried on the grounds of Federal Hill, his estate in Bardstown. According to tradition, Stephen Collins Foster, a distant relative of Rowan's, was inspired to write the ballad My Old Kentucky Home after a visit to Federal Hill in 1852, but later historians have been unable to conclude whether or not Foster ever visited the mansion at all. The mansion is now owned by the state of Kentucky and forms the centerpiece of My Old Kentucky Home State Park.

== Early life and family ==
John Rowan was born July 12, 1773, near York in the Province of Pennsylvania. He was third of five children born to Captain William and Sarah Elizabeth "Eliza" (Cooper) Rowan. His siblings included two older brothers – Andrew and Stephen – and two younger sisters – Elizabeth and Alice. Captain Rowan served in the 4th York Battery during the Revolutionary War, and after the war, he was elected to three consecutive terms as sheriff of York County.

Having exhausted most of his resources in Pennsylvania helping establish the new United States government, Captain Rowan decided to move the family to the western frontier, where he hoped to start fresh and rebuild his fortune. On October 10, 1783, the Rowans and five other families embarked on a flat bottomed boat near Redstone Creek and began their journey down the Monongahela River toward the Falls of the Ohio. The travelers expected the journey to last a few days at most, but ice along the river slowed the journey, and a lack of provisions exacerbated the delays. Three of the families disembarked near what is now Maysville, Kentucky; the Rowans would later learn that most of these settlers were killed by Indians. The remaining settlers continued downriver, reaching Louisville, Kentucky, on March 10, 1783.

In April 1784, the Rowans and five other families set out for a tract of land on the Long Falls of the Green River that Rowan had purchased before leaving Pennsylvania. The party arrived on May 11, 1784, and constructed a fort which they dubbed Fort Vienna. The fort, then located approximately 100 miles from the nearest white settlement, is the present-day town of Calhoun. The settlers at Fort Vienna frequently clashed with the Shawnee who used the area as a hunting ground. The Rowans would remain at Fort Vienna for six years.

Concerned for the education of his children, Captain Rowan moved the family to Bardstown, Kentucky, in 1790. There, John Rowan began his education under Dr. James Priestly at Salem Academy. Salem Academy was, at the time, considered one of the best educational institutions in the west. Among Rowan's classmates at the Academy were future U.S. Attorney General Felix Grundy, future U.S. Senator John Pope, future U.S. District Attorney Joseph Hamilton Daveiss, and future Kentucky state senator John Allen. Rowan and Grundy were members of a debating society called the Bardstown Pleiades which may have been an outgrowth of Salem Academy. Other notable members of the society included future Florida Governor William Pope Duval, future U.S. Postmaster General and Kentucky Governor Charles A. Wickliffe, and future Kentucky Senator Benjamin Hardin.

Completing his studies in 1793, Rowan moved to Lexington, Kentucky, and read law under former Kentucky Attorney General George Nicholas. He was admitted to the bar in May 1795 and commenced practice in Louisville. Rowan struggled financially during his early years as a lawyer. Nelson County judge Atkinson Hill took an interest in Rowan, furnishing him with money to expand his law library and taking him as a business partner. In order to earn some money, Rowan accepted an appointment as a public prosecutor, but after securing a felony conviction against a young man in his first case, he was so troubled that he resigned the office and resolved never again to play the role of prosecutor. For the remainder of his career, he always represented defendants. An advocate of education, Rowan allowed several prominent young law students to study in his office, including future U.S. Treasury Secretary James Guthrie, future Supreme Court Justice John McKinley, and future Kentucky Governor Lazarus W. Powell.

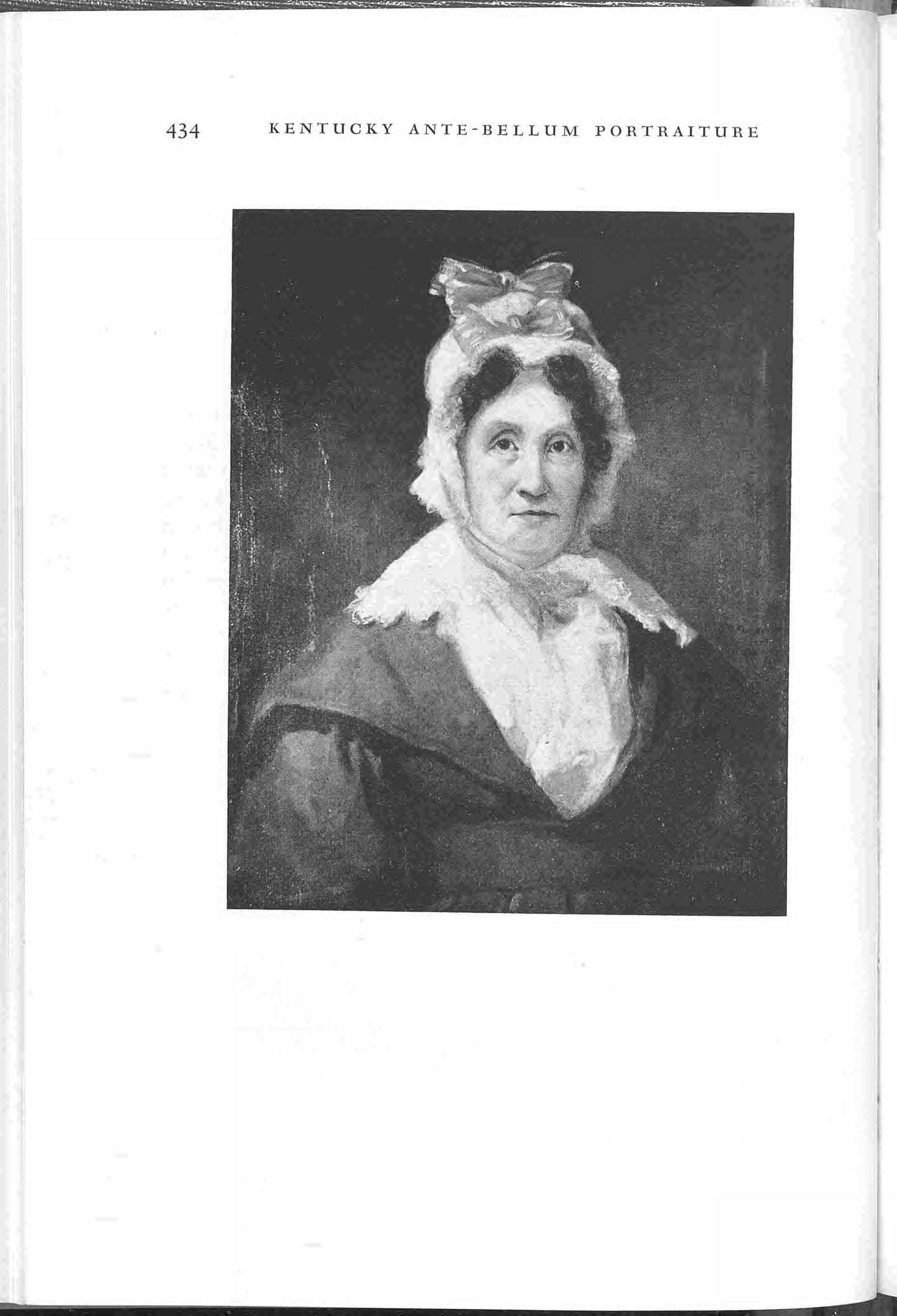
Ann Lytle Rowan, portrait by John Frankenstein, 1839

Rowan married Anne Lytle on October 29, 1794. She was the daughter of Captain William Lytle, one of the early settlers of Cincinnati, Ohio, and by this marriage Rowan became the uncle of Ohio congressman Robert Todd Lytle. Rowan and his wife – who he affectionately nicknamed "Nancy" – had nine children: Eliza Cooper (Rowan) Harney, Mary Jane (Rowan) Steele, William Lytle Rowan, Atkinson Hill Rowan, John Rowan Jr., Josephine Daviess (Rowan) Clark, Ann (Rowan) Buchanan, Alice Douglass (Rowan) Shaw Wakefield, and Elizabeth (Rowan) Hughes. Atkinson Hill Rowan served as an emissary to Spain for President Andrew Jackson. John Rowan Jr. was appointed U.S. Chargé d'Affaires to Naples by President James K. Polk, serving from 1848 to 1849. Ann Rowan married Joseph Rodes Buchanan, a noted physician of Covington, Kentucky.

In 1795, Rowan began construction of Federal Hill, his family estate, on land that his father-in-law gave him as a wedding present. Due to limited financial resources, the time required to import building materials from the east, and the craftsmanship required to construct the large home, the mansion was not completed until 1818. After a fire destroyed the log cabin in which the Rowans lived in 1812, they moved into the part of the mansion that was completed, and continued to live there while construction on the rest of the house was finished. Federal Hill was once believed to be the first brick house constructed in the state of Kentucky, but more modern sources give the designation to the William Whitley House, also known as Sportsman's Hill, which was completed in 1794 near Crab Orchard, Kentucky.

Rowan owned slaves. He identified with the Democratic-Republican Party and espoused the Jeffersonian principles of limited government and individual liberty. He was chosen to represent Nelson County at the constitutional convention held at Frankfort, Kentucky, in 1799 to draft the second Kentucky Constitution. As a delegate, he advocated the supremacy of the legislative branch over the executive and judicial branches, which he believed provided ordinary citizens a greater role in state government. The constitution adopted by the convention abolished the use of electors to choose the governor and state senators, providing for the direct election of these officers instead.

== Duel with Dr. James Chambers ==
Rowan was known throughout his life as an avid gamester. On January 29, 1801, Rowan joined Dr. James Chambers and three other men for a game of cards at Duncan McLean's Tavern in Bardstown. After several beers and games of whist, Chambers suggested playing Vingt-et-un for money instead. Rowan had determined not to gamble during this session of gaming, but impaired by the alcohol, he agreed. After a few hands, an argument broke out between Chambers and Rowan. The exact nature of the argument is not known. Some accounts claim it was over who was better able to speak Latin and Greek; others suggest that general insults were exchanged between the two men. A brief scuffle followed the disagreement.

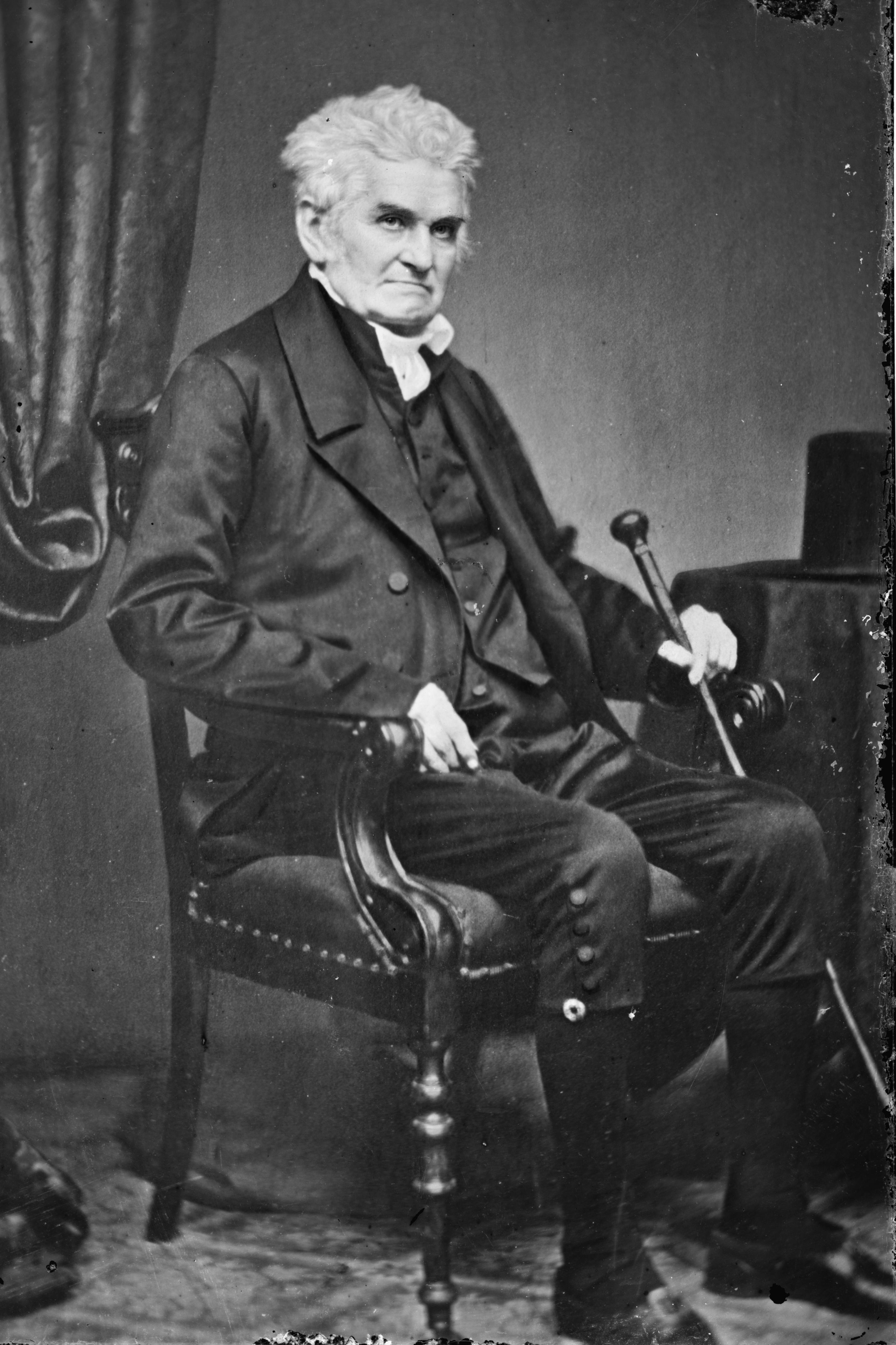
George M. Bibb served as Rowan's second in his duel with Chambers.

How the matter escalated to a duel is also the subject of some uncertainty. In his biography of Benjamin Hardin, Lucious P. Little recounts that Chambers immediately challenged Rowan to a duel. According to Little, Rowan, embarrassed at his behavior, refused the challenge and repeatedly apologized for his actions, but Chambers was insistent on the duel and continued hurling insults of growing severity at Rowan until Rowan accepted the challenge. A letter from George M. Bibb, published a year after the event and reprinted in 1912 in the Register of the Kentucky State Historical Society, claims that Chambers' challenge was issued through a letter delivered to Rowan by Chambers' friend, Major John Bullock, on January 31, 1801. Bibb claims that he and Rowan had, after the night of the incident, gone to nearby Bullitt County on business, that Rowan had returned first, and that Rowan showed Bibb the letter upon his return on February 1.

Bullock served as Chambers' second for the duel; Bibb acted as second for Rowan. Some accounts hold that Joseph Hamilton Daveiss and John Allen acted as Rowan's seconds. According to Bibb, he and Bullock met on February 1 to discuss the parameters for the duel. Bullock proposed that the matter be dropped, but Bibb insisted that Chambers would have to retract his challenge, to which Bullock would not consent. The duel was held February 3, 1801, near Bardstown. Both combatants missed with their first shots. Both men fired again, and Rowan's second shot struck Chambers, wounding him severely. (Bibb's account says that Chambers was struck in the left side; other accounts state that the shot hit Chambers in the chest.) Rowan then offered his carriage to take Chambers to town for medical attention, and Chambers asked that Rowan not be prosecuted. Despite medical aid, Chambers died the following day.

Public sentiment was against Rowan in the matter of his duel with Chambers. Soon after the duel, friends of Chambers formed a posse and rode toward Rowan's house. Rowan concocted a ruse whereby he dressed a family slave in his coat and hat and sent him riding from the house on horseback. The posse was fooled into thinking the slave was Rowan and gave chase, but the slave escaped and Rowan's life was spared as well. Days later, the owner of the land where the duel had taken place swore out a warrant for Rowan's arrest for murder. Some accounts hold that, as Commonwealth's Attorney, Rowan's friend Felix Grundy would have been responsible for prosecuting the case against Rowan and that Grundy resigned the position to avoid prosecuting his friend. Grundy's biographer, John Roderick Heller, admits that this was possible, although no evidence exists to confirm it. Heller also points out that Grundy was Commonwealth's Attorney not in Nelson County (the location of Bardstown), but in neighboring Washington County at the time. Joseph Hamilton Daveiss and Colonel William Allen served as counsel for Rowan. The judge opined that there was insufficient evidence to send the case to a grand jury, and Rowan was released.

== Secretary of State and early legislative career ==
Shortly after his duel with Chambers, Rowan moved to Frankfort, Kentucky, the state capital. In 1802, he was one of 32 men who signed a pledge to bring James Madison to Transylvania University as superintendent. This action began a long relationship between Rowan and Transylvania, and the university presented him with an honorary Doctor of Laws degree in 1823. Governor Christopher Greenup appointed Rowan Secretary of State in 1804. He served until 1806, when he was elected to the U.S. House of Representatives. He represented Kentucky's Third District (which included Bardstown) during the Tenth Congress from March 4, 1807, to March 3, 1809, even though he did not reside in that district at the time.

The first major congressional debate in which Rowan participated was over the election of William McCreery as representative from Baltimore, Maryland. Joshua Barney, McCreery's opponent in the election, claimed that McCreery did not meet a requirement in the Maryland Constitution that a representative live in the district from which he was elected for twelve months prior to the election. McCreery admitted that he had moved from Baltimore to the country prior to the election but claimed that he still owned his home in Baltimore and lived there during the winter months. A resolution was introduced to declare McCreery the duly elected representative from Baltimore, and an amendment was added to clarify that the grounds upon which the resolution was based were that McCreery had not abandoned his Baltimore home. Despite his support for states' rights, Rowan opposed the amendment because he felt that state sovereignty was only made possible by national sovereignty and that the national legislature had the right to declare a state law unconstitutional. By giving another reason for declaring McCreery duly elected, Rowan felt this issue would be obscured. The amendment was defeated by a vote of 92–8, and the resolution to declare McCreery duly elected passed 89–18.

Also during the first session of the Tenth Congress, Rowan proposed that a congressional committee be formed to investigate accusations against General James Wilkinson that, in 1788, he took money from the government of Spain in exchange for efforts to separate Kentucky from Virginia and unite it with Spain rather than the United States. Aaron Burr had been accused of working with Wilkinson in the so-called Spanish Conspiracy, and when Burr had approached Rowan in 1806 to solicit his services in defending Burr against the charges, Rowan had declined because he believed Burr to be guilty. Rowan's proposal to form an investigative committee against Wilkinson failed, but he succeeded in gaining approval for a committee to investigate federal judge Harry Innes' purported role in the Conspiracy. Rowan was appointed to the committee and delivered its report April 19, 1808; the report stated that the committee could find no evidence of wrongdoing by Innes.

Rowan was not as active during the second session of the Tenth Congress, introducing no legislation and making no major speeches. Newly elected Kentucky Senator John Pope observed in a letter to a friend that the Democratic-Republicans in Congress disliked Rowan and were disappointed in his speaking and debating ability. He opined that Rowan's attempt to investigate Wilkinson had been a slap at party founder Thomas Jefferson (then in his second term as president), under whom Wilkinson was serving as Commanding General of the United States Army. Pope went on to write that, although Rowan personally cited no party affiliation, he was claimed by the Federalist caucus in the House. In studying Rowan's short tenure in the House, historian Stephen Fackler observed that "Rowan adhered more rigidly to the precepts of Jeffersonian republicanism than Jefferson himself, for the president compromised his principles in the national interest." Fackler observed that Rowan often disagreed with Jefferson as president, and that as a result, some historians labeled him a Federalist, a designation Fackler felt was in error.

After his tenure in Congress, Rowan was elected to represent Nelson County in the Kentucky House of Representatives from 1813 to 1817. In 1817, the House debated a resolution instructing Governor Gabriel Slaughter to negotiate with the governors of Indiana and Ohio to secure passage of legislation requiring citizens of those states to return fugitive slaves. Representative James G. Birney vigorously opposed the resolution, and it was defeated. The pro-slavery members of the House then rallied behind Rowan's leadership to pass a substitute resolution which softened the most objectionable language but retained the call for fugitive slave legislation in Indiana and Ohio.

== Legislative interim and service on the Court of Appeals ==
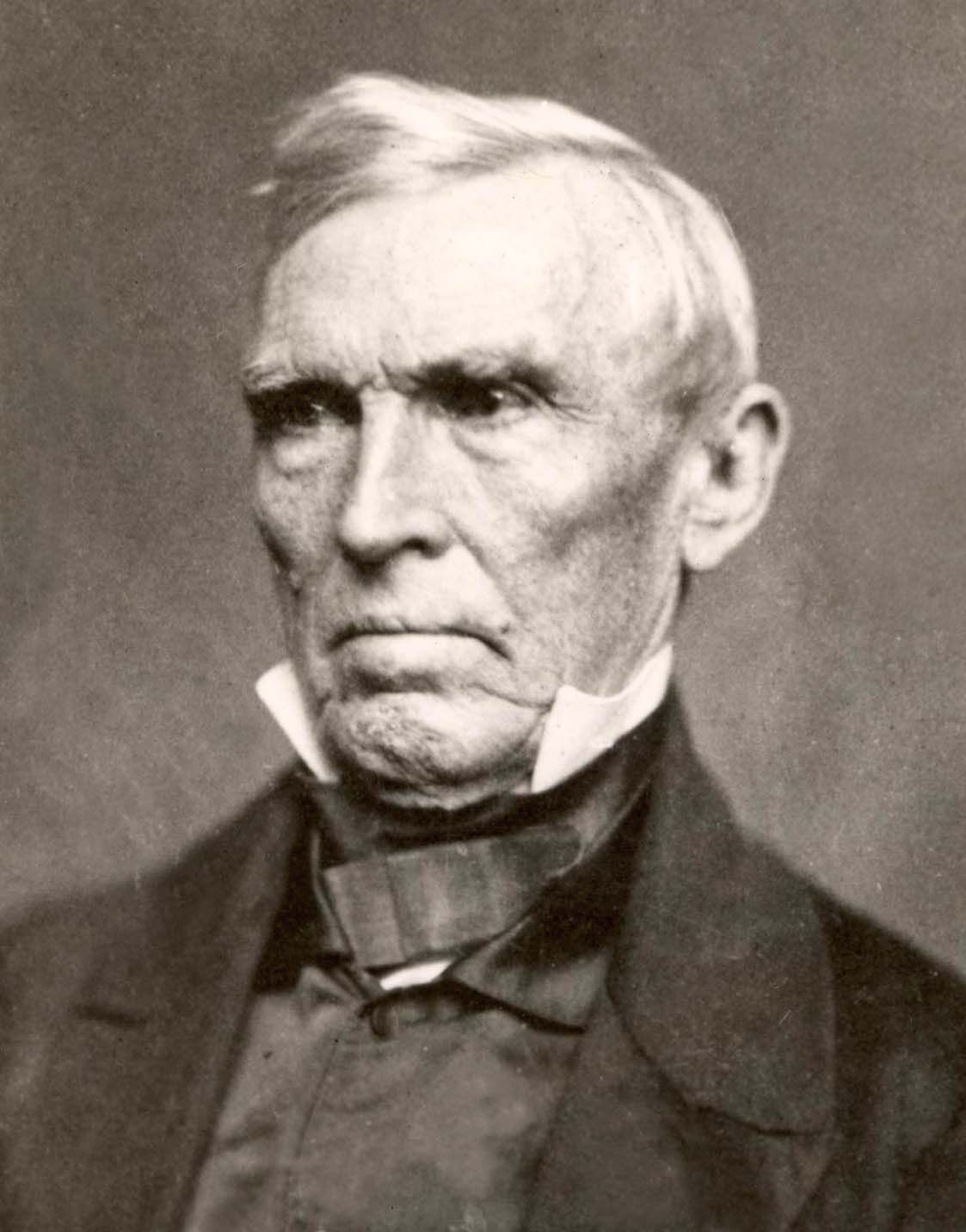
John J. Crittenden and Rowan served as commissioners to settle a border dispute with Tennessee.

Rowan often found himself in demand as an orator and host. In February 1818, he was chosen to eulogize his close friend, George Rogers Clark. In June 1819, the citizens of Louisville chose him as their official host for a visiting party that included James Monroe and Andrew Jackson. In May 1825, he was one of thirteen men chosen by the citizens of Louisville to organize a reception for a visit by the Marquis de Lafayette.

Rowan was appointed as a judge of the Kentucky Court of Appeals in 1819. During his time as a justice, he delivered a notable opinion opposing the constitutionality of chartering of the Second Bank of the United States. He also opined that the General Assembly was within its rightful powers to enact a tax on the Bank. In the case of McCulloch v. Maryland, the U.S. Supreme Court delivered a contradictory opinion. Dissatisfied with the confinement of service on the bench, Rowan resigned from the court in 1821. Though his service was brief, he was referred to as "Judge Rowan" for the rest of his life.

While Rowan was still a justice of the Court of Appeals, the General Assembly chose him and John J. Crittenden as commissioners to resolve a border dispute with Tennessee. The dispute had arisen from an erroneous survey of the border line conducted by Dr. Thomas Walker years earlier. Walker's line deviated northward from the intended line (36 degrees, 30 minutes north latitude) by some twelve miles by the time it reached the Tennessee River. The Tennessee commissioners, Felix Grundy and William L. Brown, proposed that, because it had been accepted for so long, the Walker line be observed as far west as the Tennessee River, with Kentucky being compensated with a more southerly line between the Tennessee and Mississippi Rivers. Crittenden was inclined to accept this proposal with some minor adjustments, but Rowan insisted that Tennessee honor the statutory border of 36 degrees, 30 minutes north. The Tennessee commissioners refused to submit to arbitration in the matter, and Rowan and Crittenden delivered separate reports to the Kentucky legislature. The legislature adopted Crittenden's report; Rowan then resigned as commissioner and was replaced by Robert Trimble. Thereafter, the commissioners quickly agreed to a slightly modified version of the Tennessee proposal.

In 1823, the state legislature chose Rowan and Henry Clay to represent the defendant in a second rehearing of Green v. Biddle before the U.S. Supreme Court. The case, which involved the constitutionality of laws passed by the General Assembly relating to land titles granted in Kentucky when the state was still a part of Virginia, was of interest to the legislature. The Supreme Court, however, refused the second rehearing, letting stand their previous opinion that Kentucky's laws were in violation of the compact of separation from Virginia.

== Old Court – New Court controversy ==
Due to the Panic of 1819, many citizens in Kentucky fell deep into debt and began petitioning the legislature for help. The state's politicians split into two factions. Those who advocated for measures that were more favorable to debtors were dubbed the Relief faction while those who insisted on sound money principles and the strict adherence to the obligation of contracts were called the Anti-Relief faction. In 1820, a pro-relief measure passed the General Assembly providing debtors a one-year stay on the collection of their debts if the creditor would accept payment in devalued notes issued by the Bank of the Commonwealth or a two-year stay if the creditor demanded payment in sound money. Two separate circuit courts found the law unconstitutional in the cases of Williams v. Blair and Lapsley v. Brashear.

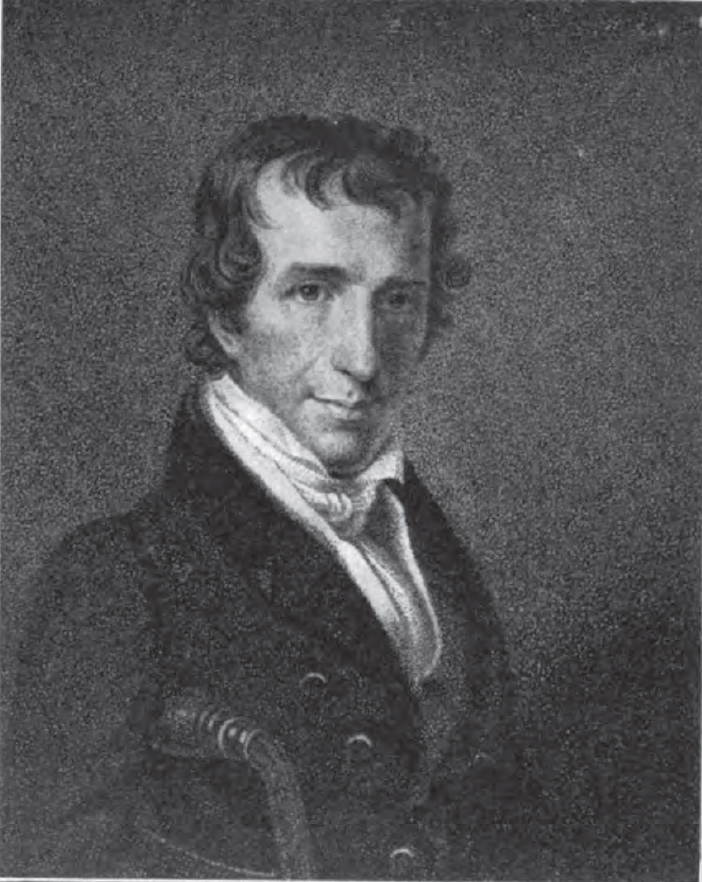
William T. Barry and Rowan were leaders of the New Court faction.

Meanwhile, Rowan, who espoused the Relief position, was elected to the Kentucky House of Representatives in 1822 representing Jefferson and Oldham counties. He immediately became the leader of the Relief faction in the House. When Relief partisans decided to appeal Williams and Lapsley to the Kentucky Court of Appeals, which was at the time the court of last resort in the state, Rowan was chosen to argue the appeal before the court alongside George M. Bibb and Lieutenant Governor William T. Barry. Their efforts failed, however, as the Court found the measure unconstitutional, upholding the decisions of the lower courts.

On December 10, 1823, Rowan presented resolutions condemning the Court's decision to the legislature. The twenty-six page preamble to the resolutions laid out the Relief faction's reasoning upon the subject of debt relief and legislative supremacy. The preamble and resolutions were adopted in the House by a vote of 56–40. The offending judges – two of whom had been Rowan's colleagues during his service on the Court – were summoned before the legislature to defend their decisions later in December. Following their appearance, Rowan introduced a measure to remove them from office; the vote in the House was 56–40 in favor of the measure, but this fell short of the two-thirds majority needed to remove the judges. The Relief faction then introduced legislation to repeal the law that originally created the Court of Appeals, then replace the abolished court with a new court. Anti-Relief partisans decried the measure as blatantly unconstitutional. Rowan was the chief defender of the measure, and after his impassioned speech on the night of December 24, 1824, it passed by simple majority. In November 1824, Rowan heavily revised the preamble and resolutions he presented in the previous legislative session. These revised documents effectively formed the faction's platform for the upcoming elections.

Rowan's role in the Old Court – New Court controversy strained his relationship with his former friend, Benjamin Hardin. Hardin and Rowan had once been so close that Hardin named one of his sons "Rowan" in his colleague's honor. After the controversy, Hardin insisted that friends and family refer to Rowan Hardin as "Ben", but few people other than Hardin himself adopted the new name.

== Service in the U.S. Senate ==
As a result of the 1824 elections, the Relief faction gained a 22–16 majority in the state Senate and a 61–39 majority in the House. The pro-Relief majority in the state Senate subsequently elected Rowan to the U.S. Senate, which had the inadvertent effect of weakening the faction's cause in the House by removing its leader there. Rowan served in the Senate from March 4, 1825, to March 3, 1831. During the Twenty-first Congress, he was chairman of the Judiciary Committee.

On April 10, 1826, Rowan sponsored an amendment to legislation to reorganize the federal judiciary that would have required seven justices to concur with a decision in order to strike down a law as unconstitutional. The amendment, which ultimately failed, was offered in the aftermath of a decision by the Supreme Court of the United States declaring an occupying claimant law to be unconstitutional; Rowan personally disagreed with the Court's decision. Rowan offered another amendment providing that ministers of the federal courts would be subject to state laws when carrying out the decisions of the federal courts. After a month of debate, the entire bill was tabled.

An ally of Senator Richard Mentor Johnson, who was a primary voice against the practice of debt imprisonment, Rowan made a notable speech denouncing the practice on the Senate floor in 1828. A consistent opponent of internal improvements and tariffs, even those that would benefit his own constituents, he voted against a measure allocating federal funds for the construction of a road connecting the cities of Lexington and Maysville. The vote was ill-received by the people of the state, and Rowan's popularity took a significant hit. When the bill was re-introduced in the next congressional session, Rowan voted for it only after receiving significant pressure from the state legislature to do so. The bill passed in this session, but newly elected president Andrew Jackson vetoed it.

In the state legislative elections of 1830, the ascendent Whig Party gained control of both houses of the General Assembly. Rowan's strict adherence to Jeffersonian democracy and leadership of the New Court faction during the court controversy of the 1820s had put him at odds with Whig founder Henry Clay. By this time, however, not even Rowan's fellow Democrats endorsed his re-election. Henry Clay was elected instead.

== Later life and legacy ==
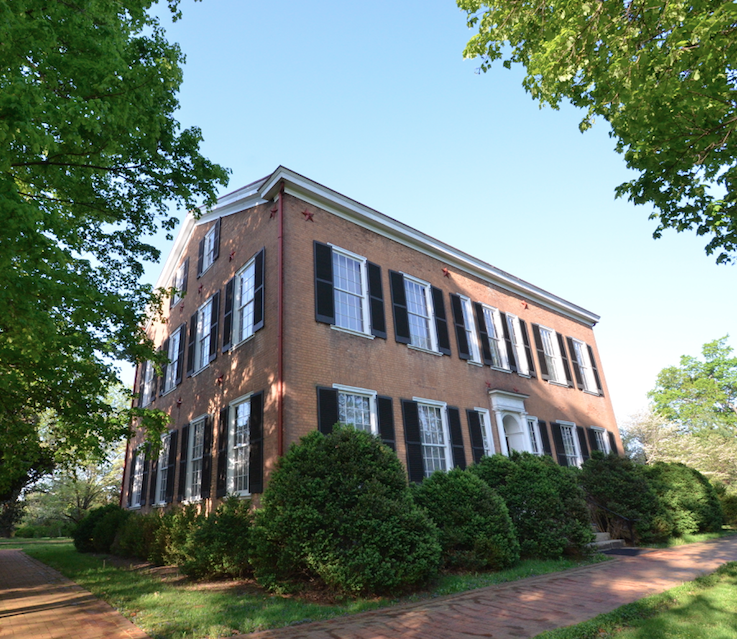
Rowan's Federal Hill mansion is now part of My Old Kentucky Home State Park.

After his service in the Senate, Rowan returned to Kentucky, dividing his time between Louisville and Bardstown. During an epidemic of cholera that spread through Bardstown in 1833, three of Rowan's children (William, Atkinson, and Mary Jane) died. The spouses of William and Mary Jane also died of cholera, as did Mary Jane's daughter, and Rowan's sister Elizabeth and her husband. Aid from Bishop Joseph Flaget and a group of nuns who traveled to Federal Hill during the epidemic probably spared the life of Rowan's orphaned granddaughter, Eliza Rowan Harney.

In 1836, Rowan and two other men founded the Louisville Medical Institute, the forerunner of the University of Louisville medical school. The next year, Rowan was chosen as the school's first president, serving in that capacity until 1842. He also served as the first president of the Kentucky Historical Society from 1838 until his death.

In his last act of public service, in 1839 Rowan was appointed as a commissioner to adjust land claims of U.S. citizens against the Republic of Mexico. During an adjournment of the commission in 1842, Rowan returned to Kentucky to visit relatives. While there, he fell ill and was unable to return to Washington, D.C.; consequently, he resigned his commission. Rowan died July 13, 1843. He was interred in the family burial ground at Federal Hill. In his will, Rowan specified that no marker should be placed over his grave, noting that his parents' graves had no markers, and he did not want to be honored above his parents. Several years later, members of his family placed a marker over his grave, despite his wishes. According to legend, the marker frequently tumbles from its base, purportedly a manifestation of Rowan haunting his grave.

Cousin of the Rowan family, Stephen Collins Foster, was inspired by Harriet Beecher Stowe's anti-slavery novel Uncle Tom's Cabin to write his ballad My Old Kentucky Home. The song was not associated with Federal Hill until after the Civil War, and Stephen likely never visited the site, as attested by his biographers such as John Tasker Howard, William Austin, Ken Emerson, and JoAnne O’Connell. The mansion remained in the possession of Judge Rowan's family until 1922, when his granddaughter, Madge (Rowan) Frost, sold it to the state of Kentucky to be preserved as a state shrine. Today, it is a part of My Old Kentucky Home State Park in Bardstown. In 1856, the Kentucky General Assembly created a new county from parts of Fleming and Morgan counties and named it Rowan County in Rowan's honor.

U.S. House of Representatives
Preceded by Matthew Walton	Member of the U.S. House of Representatives from Kentucky's 3rd congressional district March 4, 1807 – March 3, 1809	Succeeded by Henry Crist
U.S. Senate
Preceded by Isham Talbot	U.S. senator (Class 3) from Kentucky; March 4, 1825 – March 4, 1831; Served alongside: Richard M. Johnson, George M. Bibb	Succeeded by Henry Clay
