= William Davys =

Irish lawyer, judge and politician

Sir William Davys (before 1633 – 1687) was an Irish barrister and judge who held the offices of Recorder of Dublin, Prime Serjeant and Lord Chief Justice of Ireland. He was suspected of Roman Catholic sympathies and was threatened with removal from the bench as a result, but he succeeded in retaining office until his death, due largely to his influential family connections.

== Background ==
He was the eldest son of Sir Paul Davys (died 1672), Clerk to the Privy Council of Ireland and later Principal Secretary for Ireland, by his first wife Margaret Ussher (died 1633), daughter of Arthur Ussher and Judith Newcomen, and granddaughter of Sir William Ussher of Donnybrook. Sir John Davys was his half-brother and, like their father, John held office as Principal Secretary for Ireland. The father has been described as a remarkable man who during his long career was able to work amicably with Viceroys as different in character as Thomas Wentworth, 1st Earl of Strafford, Henry Cromwell, and James Butler, 1st Duke of Ormonde. It was his father's long friendship with Ormonde which gave William his own start in life, since Ormonde prided himself on being loyal to his friends. William entered Lincoln's Inn in 1649, was called to the English bar in 1657, and entered King's Inn in 1661.

== Early career ==
William obtained a reversion of his father's office as Clerk to the Privy Council in 1660. In 1661 he was made Recorder of Dublin; in the same year he was elected to the Irish House of Commons as member for Dublin City. On Ormonde's formal entry into Dublin as Lord Lieutenant of Ireland in 1662, William organised the civic reception in his honour and was knighted. Ormonde always showed William great kindness, obtaining for him sinecures such as Clerk of the Tholsel and Chief Justice (or Seneschal) of the Duke's own private Court, the Palatine Court of Tipperary. His marriage to Martha Boyle, daughter of Michael Boyle, Archbishop of Armagh and his second wife Lady Mary O'Brien in 1664 also assisted his career, as his father-in-law became Lord Chancellor of Ireland the following year.

His career suffered a check when Ormonde was replaced as Lord Lieutenant by Arthur Capell, 1st Earl of Essex. Whether for supporting the wrong political faction, or because of his alleged Catholic leanings, he was suspended from office in 1672. However he was quickly restored to favour, and on his father-in-law's urging, he was made Prime Serjeant in 1675. He was recommended for a seat on the Bench in 1673, and again in 1679, but by then his career had been damaged in the turmoil caused by the Popish Plot.

=== Popish Plot ===
On the outbreak of the Popish Plot in the autumn of 1678, William and his brother John were both accused of Roman Catholic sympathies and summoned to London to give an account of themselves. What basis there was for the accusation is hard to say: the son-in-law of an Anglican Archbishop in the 1670s was most unlikely to be a Roman Catholic, nor could any Irish Catholic at a time of extreme anti-Catholic hysteria have hoped to retain Government office. Although William later remarried the widow of one of the premier Catholic noblemen, the 3rd Earl of Clancarty, his wife Lady Elizabeth Fitzgerald was herself described as a "fierce Protestant isolated in a Catholic family." In the event, with his father-in-law and Ormonde vouching for his Protestantism, he was cleared of any suspicion of being a Catholic sympathiser, and allowed to return to Ireland.

== Lord Chief Justice ==
Sir John Povey, the Lord Chief Justice of Ireland, died in 1679, and his successor Sir Robert Booth died only a year later. Despite Ormonde's influence, Davys was passed over for this crucial office the first time, presumably due to continuing doubts about his true religious beliefs, but he was able to obtain the office on the second occasion.

Having now reached the pinnacle of his career, Davys seriously damaged his standing by his second marriage to the widowed Lady Clancarty, Elizabeth FitzGerald, who was the daughter of George FitzGerald, 16th Earl of Kildare and Lady Joan Boyle. Whether it was made for love or for social advancement, the marriage offended both his father-in-law Archbishop Boyle (although Elizabeth was his cousin through her mother) and the FitzGeralds, who were engaged in a lawsuit with the Ormonde family, which came before Davys as Chief Justice. The FitzGeralds accused Davys of bias, due to his close friendship with the Duke of Ormonde, and threatened to have him removed from the Bench: Davys replied that he feared to do wrong, but did not fear the consequences of doing justice.

Possibly Davys was attracted by the great wealth of his teenage stepson Donough MacCarthy, 4th Earl of Clancarty, while Donough's uncle Justin McCarthy, Viscount Mountcashel, was very close to the future James II. Unfortunately Justin quarrelled irrevocably with Lady Davys when, in an episode that caused a notable scandal, he virtually kidnapped the young earl and forced him into an underage marriage with Elizabeth Spencer, daughter of Robert Spencer, 2nd Earl of Sunderland. The marriage, which turned out badly, caused Davys' wife much grief in her last years, and suggests that the couple had little influence at Court.

On the accession of James II, it was widely rumoured that Davys would be removed from office; he was ageing, and "much impaired by the gout" and had quarrelled with many of his influential friends and relatives. In the event, James seems to have approved of Davys, perhaps because of his alleged Catholic sympathies, and he duly kissed the King's hand. Despite further rumours of his impending removal he remained in office until his death in 1687. He was buried at St. Audoen's Church, Dublin.

His widow Elizabeth survived until 1698, much troubled in her last years by her son's turbulent career. He was imprisoned in the Tower of London as a traitor, escaped to find his long-estranged wife Lady Elizabeth Spencer, and at last consummated their marriage, only to be arrested by her outraged family. The affair caused a furore, but fortunately, King William III took the matter lightly, and granted Lady Davys' request that her son and daughter-in-law be allowed to go into exile in Germany.

== Will ==
Davys's only child, a daughter by his first wife Martha Boyle, died young; having no surviving children, he wished to provide for his step-daughter, Lady Catherine MacCarthy (Catherine had at least two sisters, Margaret and Elizabeth, who both died unmarried). At the same time, he wished his house, St. Catherine's Park, Leixlip, which he had bought and improved, to remain in the Davys family. His will contained the curious condition that whichever son of his brother John married Catherine should inherit. His nephew Paul married her, duly inherited St. Catherine's, and after Justin MacCarthy's death had the title Viscount Mount Cashell revived in his own favour.

== Reputation ==
Elrington Ball believed that whatever Davys' good qualities, he owed his advancement to his father's high reputation as a public servant and to the friendship of Ormonde. On the other hand, his refusal to give in to threats from the FitzGerald family as regards the judgment he should give in their lawsuit against Ormonde suggests that he was a man of integrity, and, whatever his personal beliefs, he seems to have been genuinely in favour of religious tolerance.

== Notes ==
Legal offices
Preceded by Sir Robert Booth	Lord Chief Justice of Ireland; 1680–1687	Succeeded by Thomas Nugent
