= International Conference on Web Services =

- Abbreviation: ICWS
- Discipline: Services computing

Publication details
- Publisher: Services Society
- History: 2003–present
- Frequency: annual

The International Conference on Web Services (ICWS) denotes an international forum for researchers and industry practitioners focused on Web services. Since 2018 there are two ICWS events, one is sponsored by Services Society and Springer, and the other is sponsored by the IEEE Computer Society (IEEE ICWS). The IEEE ICWS event has an 'A' rating in the Conference Portal - Core and an 'A' rating in the Excellence in Research for Australia.

== Areas of focus ==
ICWS features research papers with a wide range of topics, focusing on various aspects of IT services. Some of the topics include Web services specifications and enhancements, Web services discovery and integration, Web services security, Web services standards and formalizations, Web services modeling, Web services-oriented software engineering, Web services-oriented software testing, Web services-based applications and solutions, Web services realizations, semantics in Web services, and all aspects of Service-Oriented Architecture (SOA) infrastructure.

== History ==
The International Conference on Web Services was founded by Dr. Liang-Jie Zhang in June 2003, Las Vegas, USA. Meanwhile, the first ICWS-Europe 2003 (ICWS-Europe'03), founded by Dr. Liang-Jie Zhang with Prof. Mario Jeckle, was held in Germany in October 2003. In 2004, ICWS-Europe was changed to the European Conference on Web Services (ECOWS), held in Erfurt, Germany. In 2012, ECOWS was formally merged into ICWS. Since then, the entire Services Computing community combined the efforts and focused on one prime international forum for web-based services: ICWS.
