= Senator Crist =

Senator Crist may refer to:

- Charlie Crist (born 1956), Florida State Senate
- Henry Crist (1764–1844), Kentucky State Senate
- Victor Crist (born 1957), Florida State Senate
