= ICWS =

ICWS may refer to:

- Institute of Commonwealth Studies, University of London, UK
- International College Wales Swansea (ICWS) - Swansea University, UK
- International Conference on Web Services
- International Core War Society
