= St. Joseph's Boys' Higher Secondary School, Kozhikode =

St. Joseph's Boys' Higher Secondary School
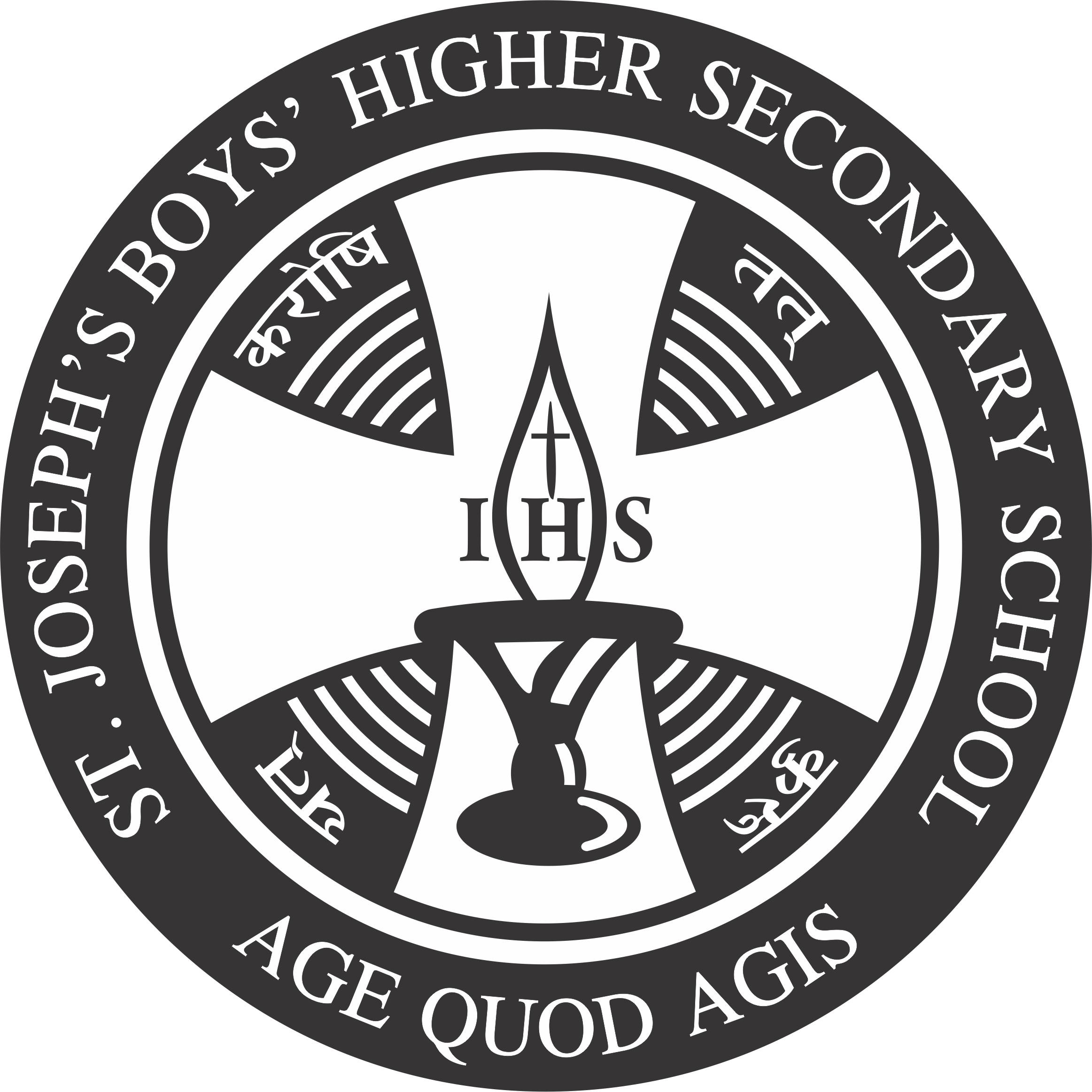

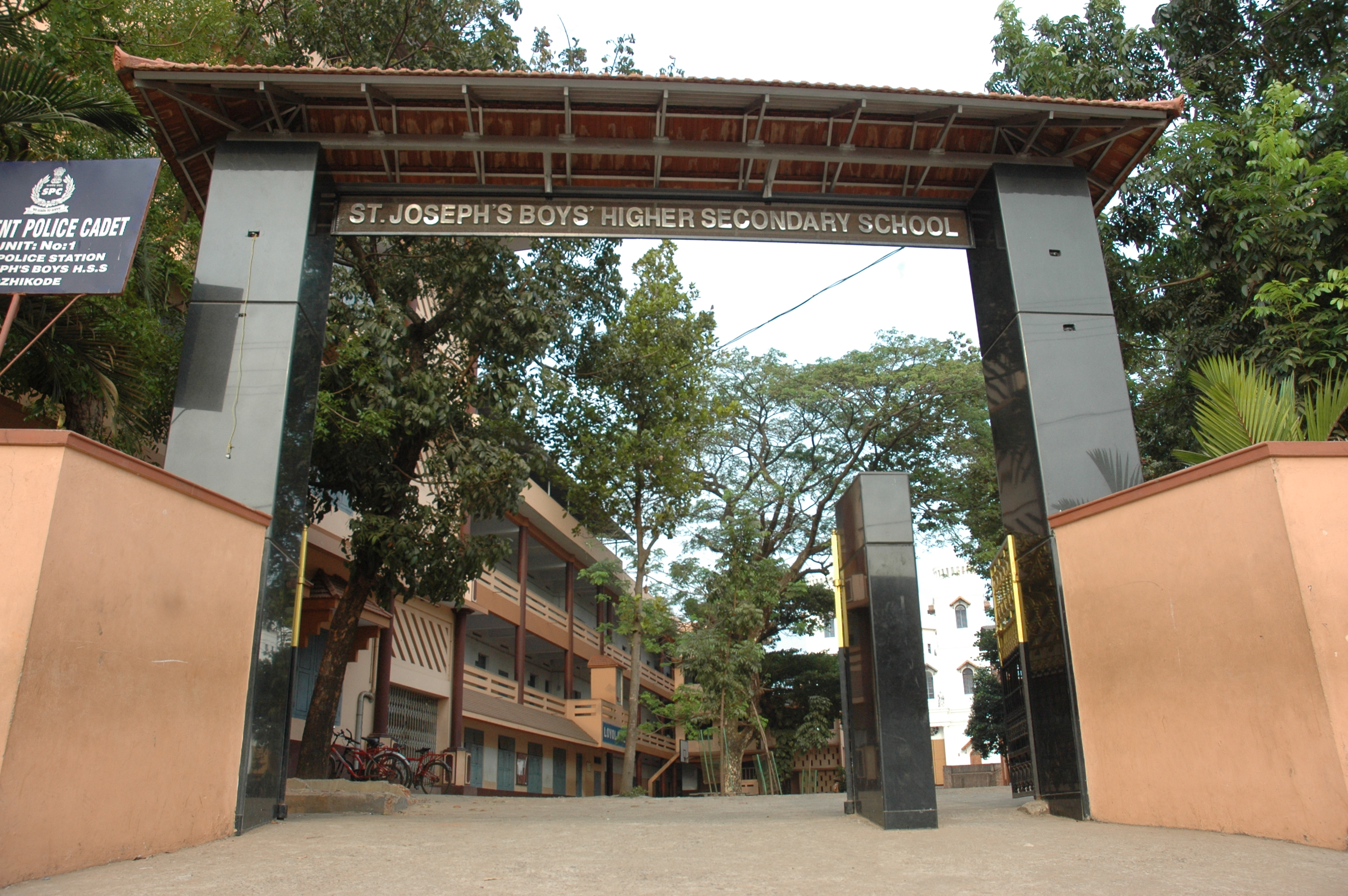
- Entrance of the school

Location
- kozhikode, silk street Kozhikode, Kerala; India
- Coordinates: 11°15′30″N 75°46′28″E

Information
- Motto: Latin: Age Quod Agis (Do well what you do)
- Religious affiliation: Catholicism
- Denomination: Jesuits
- Established: 1793; 233 years ago
- Principal: Fr. M. F. Anto SJ
- Headmaster: SUNIL JOSE
- Grades: 5—12
- Enrollment: c. 2000
- Feeder schools: St. Joseph's Junior ICSE School, Kozhikode

St. Joseph's Boys' Higher Secondary School is a Government Aided Catholic secondary school for boys located in Kozhikode, in the state of Kerala, India. Established in 1793, it is one of the oldest educational institutions in India and the oldest school in Kerala.

St. Joseph's Junior ICSE School in Kozhikode, established by the Jesuits in 1961, is a feeder school for the higher secondary school.

== Notable alumni ==
- Leon Augustine – Indian footballer with Bengaluru FC
- Joseph G. Davis – An information systems researcher and professor, University of Sydney
- K. Kelappan – Indian freedom fighter, founder of Nair Service Society
- Faizal Kottikollon – Chief executive of KEF Holdings
- Vinod Kovoor – film/TV actor
- Moorkoth Kumaran – Second S.N.D.P Yogam General Secretary
- Neeraj Madhav – Actor, Rapper and Dancer.
- Padmashri Dr Azad Moopen – Chairman and managing director of Aster DM Healthcare
- M. K. Muneer – Politician, Doctor, Social worker, Singer, Poet and Author
- Justice Bechu Kurian Thomas – An Indian judge
- N. V. Krishna Warrier – Poet, Scholar, Critic, Essayist
- P. A. Mohammed Riyas, Minister for PWD and Tourism, Government of Kerala
- Sudheesh – Actor

== See also ==
- List of Jesuit schools
- List of schools in Kerala
- Violence against Christians in India
