= Thomas Bramhall =

Irish landowner and baronet

Sir Thomas Bramhall, 1st Baronet was an Irish landowner and Member of Parliament.

== Biography ==
He was the son and heir of John Bramhall, Archbishop of Armagh, and sat in Parliament for Dungannon from 1661 to 1666. On 31 May 1662, he was created a baronet in the Baronetage of Ireland, and on 25 June 1663 succeeded his father to the family estate of Bramhall Hall, Rathmullyan, County Meath. In 1664 he was High Sheriff of County Louth, and in that year was married to Elizabeth, daughter of Sir Paul Davys, Secretary of State (Ireland) and his second wife Anne Parsons. They had no children, and on his death in Dublin in 1667 his co-heirs were his three sisters. His widow was remarried in 1669 to John Topham LLD (later knighted), Judge Advocate General for Ireland and Vicar General of Dublin.

Baronetage of Ireland
| New creation | Baronet (of Rathmullen); 1662–1667 | Extinct |
