= Paul Davys, 1st Viscount Mount Cashell =

Paul Davys, 1st Viscount Mount Cashell (c.1670–1716) was an Irish peer of the early eighteenth century.

== Background ==
He was the elder son of Sir John Davys and Anne Thelwall. His father was Secretary of State (Ireland), as was his grandfather Sir Paul Davys (died 1672). The Davys family are recorded as living at Kill, County Kildare since the sixteenth century. Paul's uncle, whose heir he was, was Sir William Davys, Lord Chief Justice of Ireland.

== Inheritance and peerage ==
Sir William, who died in 1687, had bought and improved St. Catherine's Park, Leixlip, which he wished to descend to his male heirs. At the same time, he wished to provide for his stepdaughters, and in particular for Lady Catherine McCarthy. These were the daughters of Callaghan MacCarty, 3rd Earl of Clancarty (died 1676) and Lady Elizabeth FitzGerald, daughter of George FitzGerald, 16th Earl of Kildare and Lady Joan Boyle, who remarried Sir William in 1682. (Catherine had at least two sisters, Margaret and Elizabeth, both of whom died unmarried). His will contained the curious provision that whichever of his brother's sons should marry Catherine would inherit; Paul duly married her and inherited the estate.

With his inheritance, and the friendship of James Butler, 2nd Duke of Ormonde, to whom he admitted he owed his advancement, he decided that he had sufficient wealth and influence to acquire a title. He chose Viscount Mount Cashell, which had previously been a Jacobite title given to Catherine's uncle Justin MacCarthy, who died in 1694. Accordingly, in 1706 Paul was created Viscount and Baron Mount Cashell.

== Character ==
Elrington Ball describes Mount Cashell as a young man of fashion, who found life in Dublin dull, and was fond of malicious gossip about his fellow peers. On the other hand, he describes Lady Mount Cashell as a woman who was greatly esteemed for her religious devotion and acts of charity.

Lord Mount Cashell died on 6 August 1716 and was buried in the family vault in St. Audoen's Church; his widow died in 1738, having outlived most of her children.

== Family ==
Ball refers to Mount Cashell and Catherine having numerous children, most of whom died young; Belmore lists six children of whom three died young:

- William, died 1702
- Charles, died 1703
- James, 2nd Viscount Mount Cashell (1710–1719)
- Edward, 3rd Viscount Mount Cashell ( 1711–1736) on whose death the title became extinct
- Elizabeth, who married her cousin Justin MacCarthy
- Margaret (died 1778) who married James Barrymore, 5th Earl of Barrymore and had issue.

Peerage of Ireland
| New creation | Viscount Mount Cashell; 1706–1716 | Succeeded by James Davys |
