= William Lingen =

18th century official in Ireland

William Lingen (fl. 1707–1755) was an official in the Dublin Castle administration in Ireland.

Details of Lingen's background and early life are not known, but he was serving as a clerk at the Dublin Post Office under Charles Delafaye in 1707. He later advanced into civil administration, serving as an under-secretary, and then as Secretary to the Lords Justices of Ireland alongside Thomas Tickell. In 1744, he was appointed to the senior position of Secretary of State, in which capacity he was chair of the Privy Council of Ireland and engaged in regular full correspondence with the crown. He served in the role until 1755. Details of his later life and death are unknown. His portrait was painted in the 1740s by the prominent Irish artist, Anthony Lee.

Political offices
Preceded by Edward Southwell Jr.	Secretary of State (Ireland); 1744–1755	Succeeded by Thomas Carter
