= John Davys (died 1689) =

Irish politician

Sir John Davys (1646 – November 1689) was an Irish politician.

== Biography ==
Davys was son of Sir Paul Davys by his second wife Anne, daughter of Sir William Parsons, 1st Baronet, and younger brother of Sir William Davys, Lord Chief Justice of Ireland. He was educated at Trinity College, Dublin and Lincoln's Inn.

In 1678 Davys was granted the office of Principal Secretary for Ireland in reversion, in the event of the demise of the current office holder Lord Lanesborough, who died in 1683. This office had been previously held by his father Sir Paul Davys. He was appointed to the Privy Council of Ireland in about 1682.

During the Popish Plot, both John and his brother were accused of Catholic sympathies and summoned to London to account for their behaviour, but were cleared of any suspicion of disloyalty on the evidence of James Butler, 1st Duke of Ormonde, a lifelong friend of their father, and Michael Boyle, Archbishop of Armagh, who was William's father-in-law. After the accession of James II, John is said to have opposed the King's policies and to have absented himself from Ireland for a time.

Francis Elrington Ball in his History of Dublin praises John Davys as a man of prudence and integrity.

== Family ==
By his wife, Anne Thelwall, Davys had two sons, Paul and Robert. Under the will of their uncle Sir William Davys, whichever of them married Sir William's stepdaughter Lady Catherine MacCarty (daughter of Callaghan MacCarty, 3rd Earl of Clancarty and Lady Elizabeth Fitzgerald) would inherit the principal Davys estate, St Catherine's Park, Leixlip. The elder, Paul, duly married her, and was later created Viscount Mountcashell, reviving the title previously by his wife's uncle Justin MacCarthy, Viscount Mountcashell.
