= Thomas Tickell =

English poet (1685–1740)

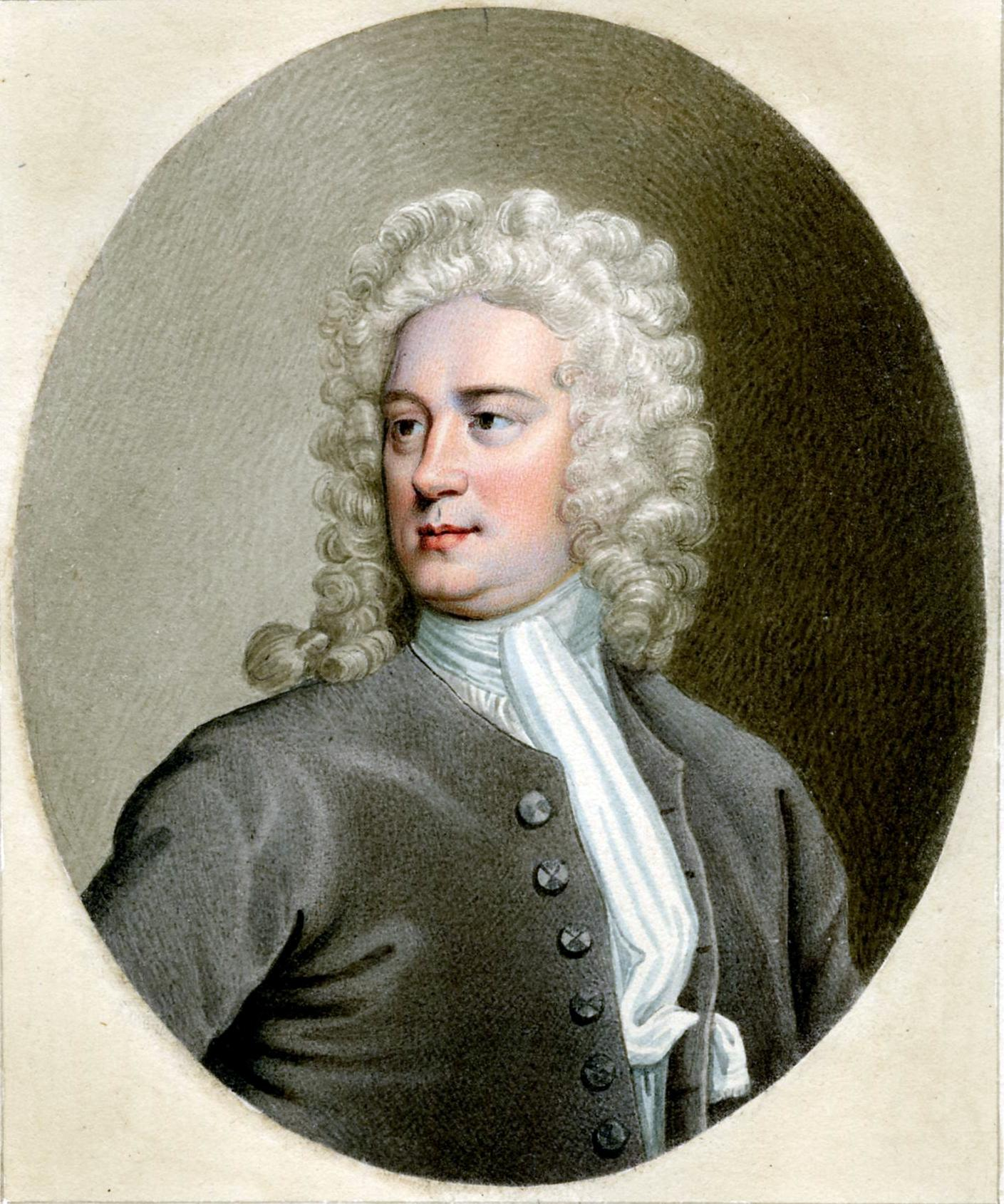
Portrait of Thomas Tickell by Sylvester Harding

Thomas Tickell (17 December 1685 – 23 April 1740) was a minor English poet and man of letters.

== Life ==
The son of a clergyman, he was born at Bridekirk near Cockermouth, Cumberland. He was educated at St Bees School 1695–1701, and in 1701 entered The Queen's College, Oxford, taking his M.A. degree in 1709. He became a fellow of his college in the next year, and in 1711 University Reader or Professor of Poetry. He did not take orders, but by a dispensation from the Crown was allowed to retain his fellowship until his marriage to Clotilda Eustace in 1726 in Dublin. Tickell acquired the name ‘Whigissimus’, because of his close association with the Whig parliamentary party.

In 1717 he was appointed Under Secretary to Joseph Addison, Secretary of State. In 1724 Tickell was appointed secretary to the Lords Justices of Ireland alongside William Lingen, a post which he retained until his death in 1740, at Bath, aged 54.

Tickell owned a house and small estate in Glasnevin on the banks of the River Tolka, which later became the site of the Botanic Gardens. A double line of yew trees (known as Addison's Walk) from Tickell's garden is incorporated into the Gardens.

He married in 1726 Clotilda Eustace, daughter and co-heiress of Sir Maurice Eustace of Harristown, County Kildare, and his second wife Clotilda Parsons. Maurice was in turn the nephew and heir of the immensely wealthy judge and landowner Sir Maurice Eustace, Lord Chancellor of Ireland. Clotilde, who outlived her husband by more than fifty years, was described by her family as "a most clever and excellent lady". They had four surviving children, including John, father of Richard. We have it on the authority of Samuel Johnson that Tickell was a devoted family man and temperate in his habits.

His grandson Richard Tickell became a playwright and married Mary Linley, of the Linley musical dynasty.

== Writing ==
Tickell's success in literature, as in life, was largely due to the friendship of Joseph Addison, who procured for him (1717) an under-secretaryship of state, to the chagrin of Richard Steele, who from then on bore a grudge against Tickell. During the peace negotiations with France, Tickell published in 1713 the Prospect of Peace.

In 1715 he brought out a translation of the first book of the Iliad contemporaneously with Alexander Pope's version. Addison's reported description of Tickell's version as the best that ever was in any language roused the anger of Pope, who assumed that Addison was the author. Addison instructed Tickell to collect his works, which were printed in 1721 under Tickell's editorship.

Kensington Garden (1722), Tickell's longest poem, is sometimes viewed as inflated and pedantic. It has been said that Tickell's poetic powers were awakened by his admiration for the person and genius of Addison, and undoubtedly his best work is the sincere and dignified elegy addressed to Addison's stepson Edward Rich, 7th Earl of Warwick on Addison's death:

He taught us how to live, and oh! too high, the price for knowledge, taught us how to die.

His ballad of Cohn and Mary was for a long time the most popular of his poems. Tickell contributed to The Spectator and The Guardian. *His Works were printed in 1749 and are included in Chalmers's and other editions of the English Poets.
