= Paul Davys =

Irish politician and civil servant

Sir Paul Davys (c. 1600–1672) was an Irish politician and civil servant, who held office as Clerk to the Privy Council of Ireland and later as Secretary of State (Ireland). He had considerable influence in public affairs, and enjoyed the close friendship of the Lord Lieutenant, James Butler, 1st Duke of Ormonde. His sons, William and John, both attained high office. He was the grandfather of Paul Davys, 1st Viscount Mount Cashell.

== Background ==
He was born in Kill, County Kildare. His father, John Davys, was a small landowner who seems to have lacked influential connections. Elrington Ball suggests that Paul's rise to prominence was largely due to his first marriage to Margaret Ussher, granddaughter of the highly respected public official Sir William Ussher of Donnybrook, Clerk of the Privy Council. His second marriage to Anne Parsons, daughter of Sir William Parsons, made him a member of an influential New English family.

== Career ==
Paul succeeded his first wife's grandfather as Clerk of the Privy Council, partly due to the premature death of his own father-in-law Arthur Ussher, who was Deputy Clerk and would no doubt have succeeded his father, but who drowned trying to ford the River Dodder in south County Dublin during the great flood of 1628. Paul seems to have been an able and conscientious official; Ball refers to his "long and painful service" as Clerk. He was elected to the Irish House of Commons as member for Enniskillen in the Parliament of 1634, and for County Donegal in that of 1639. He was in favour with the all-powerful Lord Deputy of Ireland, Thomas Wentworth, 1st Earl of Strafford; more importantly, he gained the lifelong friendship of the Duke of Ormonde, who did all in his power to advance the career first of Davys, and later of his sons. No doubt through Ormonde's influence, he became Principal Secretary of State for Ireland, in reversion to Sir Philip Mainwaring.

After the downfall of the Royalist cause in Ireland, Davys might have been expected to retire into private life. In fact, he seems to have retained some political influence under the Commonwealth, and is said to have been close to Henry Cromwell. Rumours about his loyalty were certainly widespread enough for his friend Ormonde, at the Restoration, to defend Davys as one who had "ever been loyal to the true cause".

These doubts about his loyalty did not hinder his post-Restoration career: he sat in the House of Commons for County Kildare in the Parliament of 1661, received large grants of land, mainly in County Donegal, and became a member of the Privy Council. On the death of Sir Philip Mainwaring in 1661, Davys who already held the reversion to the office, became Secretary of State. There appear to have been complaints about his slowness and inefficiency in the role of Secretary, since Ormonde, rather defensively, argued that his "old-fashioned" ways were suited to Ireland. He retained office until his death in 1672; in his last years, he was probably living at his son William's house at St. Catherine's Park, in Leixlip, County Kildare. He died on 7 December 1672, and was buried in St. Audoen's Church, Dublin.

== Family ==
By Margaret Ussher, daughter of Arthur Ussher and Judith Newcomen, who died in 1633, he was the father of:

- James, who died young
- Sir William Davys, Lord Chief Justice of Ireland.

He remarried Anne, sixth daughter of Sir William Parsons, 1st Baronet of Bellamont and Elizabeth Lany. Their children were:

- George (died 1660)
- Sir John Davys, who like his father was Secretary of State, and was the father of:
  - Paul Davys, 1st Viscount Mount Cashell
- Ursula (died 1673), who married Sir Francis Blundell, 3rd Baronet
- Elizabeth, who married firstly Sir Thomas Bramhall, 1st Baronet (died 1667), only son and heir of John Bramhall, Archbishop of Armagh, and secondly Sir John Topham (died 1700), Judge Advocate General for Ireland and Vicar General of Dublin. She had no issue by either marriage

== Reputation ==
Elrington Ball describes him as a "remarkable man" who held office during forty turbulent years and was able to retain the confidence of each successive Government in that time.
