= Joseph Davies =

Joseph or Joe Davies may refer to:

== Sportsmen ==
- Joe Davies (footballer, born 1864) (1864–1943), Newton Heath F.C., Wolverhampton Wanderers F.C. and Wales international footballer
- Joe Davies (footballer, born 1870) (1870–?), Everton F.C., Manchester City F.C., Sheffield United F.C. and Wales international footballer
- Joe Davies (footballer, born 1926) (1926–1973), Chester City F.C. player
- Joe Davies (cricketer) (born 1992), English cricketer
- Joe Davies (rugby union) (born 1995), Welsh rugby union player

== Others ==
- Joseph E. Davies (1876–1958), United States ambassador to the Soviet Union
- Joseph John Davies (1889–1976), British soldier
- Joseph Davies (Australian politician) (1880–1954), Australian politician
- Joseph Davies (British politician) (1866–1954), UK Member of Parliament for Crewe elected 1918
- Joseph Davies (composer) (dates unknown), composer of classical music
- Joseph Davies (priest) (1890–1952), Dean of Monmouth
- Joseph Davies (magazine editor) (died 1831), Welsh solicitor and magazine publisher
- Joseph Davies (1923–2016), military officer, politician, and namesake of the Joe Davies Heritage Airpark

== See also ==
- Joseph Hamilton Daveiss (1774–1811), soldier
- Joe Davis (disambiguation) (includes Joe and Joseph)
