= Maria T. Daviess =

American poet (1814–1896)

Maria Thompson Daviess
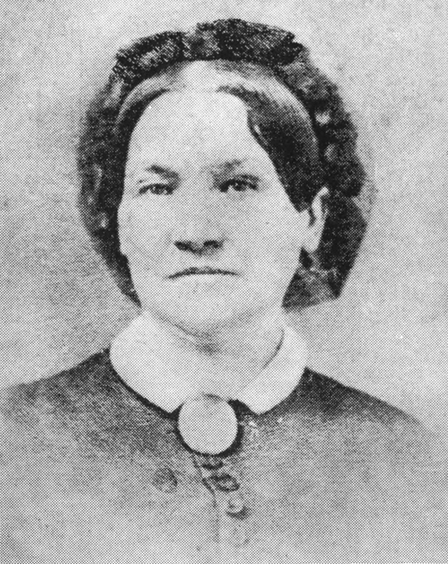
- Born: Maria Thompson; October 31, 1814; Harrodsburg, Kentucky, U.S.
- Died: December 19, 1896 (aged 82); Harrodsburg
- Occupation: author
- Spouse: William Newton Daviess (m. 1839; died 1881)
- Children: Hannah Daviess Pittman
- Relatives: John Burton Thompson (brother); Maria Thompson Daviess (granddaughter); Philip B. Thompson Jr. (nephew)
- Writing career
- Pen name: unspecified
- Language: English
- Genre: poetry
- Subject: local history

Maria T. Daviess (née, Thompson; also known as, Mrs. Maria Thompson Daviess; misspelled, Daveiss; pen names, unspecified; October 31, 1814 – December 19, 1896) was a 19th-century American author from Kentucky. Among her publications were Roger Sherman, a Tale of '76; Woman's Love; a volume of Poems; and History of Mercer and Boyle Counties.

== Early life and education ==
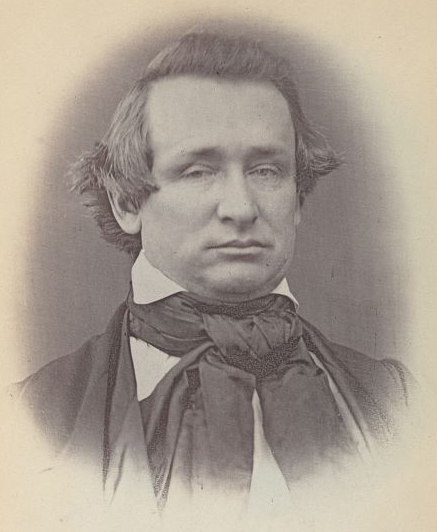
John Burton Thompson, brother

Maria (sometimes "Marie") Thompson was born in Harrodsburg, Kentucky, on October 31, 1814. Her parents were John B. Thompson Sr. (died 1833) and Nancy (or Anne) Porter Robards (1790–1870); they married in 1807. Her brothers were John Burton Thompson (1810–1874); Henry Thompson (1812–1900); Charles Thompson (1818–1872); and Philip B. Thompson (born 1820), who had twin sons Philip B. Thompson Jr. and John B. Thompson (who married Martha "Mattie" Anderson, a sister of the Harrodsburg-born writer Zoe Anderson Norris). Her sisters were Elizabeth Thompson (1822–1883); Ann Thompson (1826–1889); Susan Burton (Thompson) Massie (born 1828); and Katherine (Thompson) Dun (1831–1894).

Daviess's grandfathers, Capt. George Robards and Col. John Thompson, were both natives of the Old Dominion who had fought in the American Revolutionary War. They both married women of the Old Dominion and soon after removed to Kentucky, settling on adjoining plantations. The two men became friends, drawn together by their common memories of service in the field, and their friendship resulted in an alliance by marriage between the two families. Nancy Robards and John B. Thompson were married in 1807, and after a short residence on their farm, they moved to Harrodsburg where they settled into married life. Mr. Thompson practiced his profession, the law, and occasionally served in the Legislature of his State. He was a member of the State Senate when the cholera epidemic occurred in 1833, which claimed his life.

The death of John B. Thompson seriously affected his family's future, but the mother assured that her four sons received liberal educations, and her daughters attended the village school in Harrodsburg, which was then among the best in the West.

Daviess had every opportunity to acquire social distinction. Residing in Harrodsburg, which every summer for many years was considered to be a resort of fashion and culture, she was brought into close contact with the élite of Southern and Western society that for six months of the year filled the town.

== Career ==
Daviess's writings, especially poetry, were not the result of her training in belles-lettres, but rather the overflow of feeling and fancy that would not be repressed. Her coming before the public was not with the intention of ever writing professionally, nor the pursuit of fame. A bridal compliment to a friend was so kindly received, that, by request from one and another editor, Daviess published many works in various newspapers, seldom under her own name, but signed by such a pen name as the passing fancy suggested. Her effusions were extensively copied, and complimented for their smooth flow of rhyme and almost redundant beauty of expression. "The Nun" was the most elaborate poem she ever published. "A Harvest Hymn" offers a spirit of gratitude. Most of Daviess's manuscripts and copies of her published articles were destroyed by an accident. Roger Sherman, A Tale of '76 and Woman's Love, are her best-known stories.

For some years after her marriage, in 1839, Daviess did not write much. The first works of her revived authorship were Roger Sherman, A Tale of '76, and Woman's Love, both very well-conceived and sustained stories. But her strong conviction that the plain, practical duties of life should command, if necessary, the whole of every woman's time, tinged her themes. Her later writings seem to have been a kind of photograph of her everyday life. She received from the Kentucky State Agricultural Society a premium for the essay on the "Cultivation and Uses of Chinese Sugar-Cane," a product she was the first to introduce into the State, prophesying it would, as it did, become a staple of the West. Subsequently, she was awarded a diploma for an essay upon some literary theme by the National Fair, held in St. Louis in the 1860s.

For some time, she was special contributor to several leading agricultural papers. She was a regular correspondent of The Country Gentleman and Coleman's Rural World. Her last contribution for The Country Gentleman was written on her eighty-second birthday. Her letters in these journals were among their most charming features. Daviess could please her readers with explanations of the useful as much as descriptions of the beautiful, often blending the two together in a manner thought to be quite her own. Starting in 1885 she taught at Daughters College in Harrodsburg, with colleagues including Zoe Anderson Norris.

Many of her neighbors were unaware that Daviess "wrote for publication," as she seemed to mingle literary habits easily with the responsibilities of a large family.

== Personal life ==
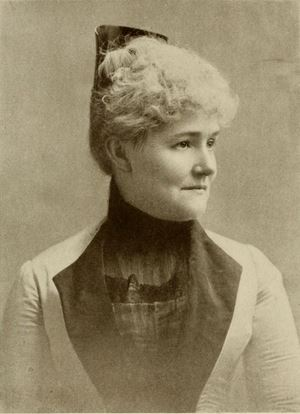
Hannah D. Pittman, daughter

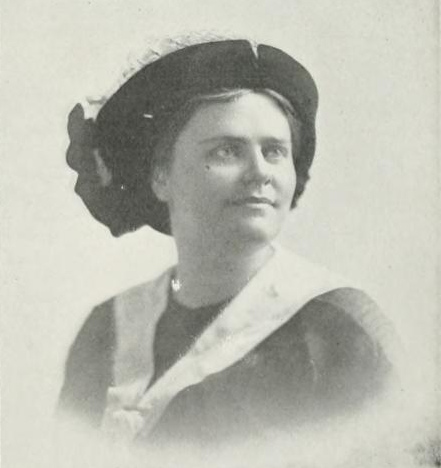
Maria Thompson Daviess, granddaughter

In 1839, she married Maj. William Newton Daviess (1811–1881), the son of Capt. Samuel Daviess, and the nephew of Col. Joseph Hamilton Daveiss. Maj. William Daviess lived on a beautiful estate called "Hayfields," at 122 East Poplar Street, near Harrodsburg. He was celebrated throughout the State as a raconteur, a historian, a student of human nature, and a great reader of books; he had a strong judicial mind, having been educated for the law. He represented his district in the State Senate for two years and at one time declined an offer of a nomination for Congress, saying that "politics sooner or later engulfs men's souls," and he might not be able to withstand the temptations offered. Thereafter, he lived the life of a "Latin farmer," with his home always open to strangers and friends. After Daviess was widowed, she ran the family's large farm of 1,000 acres (400 ha).

The couple had at least two daughters, Hannah Daviess Pittman of St. Louis, Missouri, and Annie T. Daviess; and at least one son, John Burton T. Daviess, the father of artist and novelist, Maria Thompson Daviess, for whom Daviess was a role model.

== Death and legacy ==
Daviess died in Harrodsburg on December 19, 1896. Ten years before her death, she had published a History of Mercer and Boyle Counties, Ky. in installments in the Harrodsburg Democrat. The work was republished in 1924 in book form, its preface written by D. M. Hutton, editor of The Harrodsburg Herald, thus:

Many persons have expressed a deep desire for a history of Mercer and Boyle counties covering that period from the coming of the forters to shortly after the Civil War. The Harrodsburg Herald, sensible to that need, is here with publishing in book form the history of that time as written by Mrs. Maria Thompson Daviess. It was first published in the early eighties in the Harrodsburg Democrat, in installments as she wrote them, and this year of 1924 was republished in The Harrodsburg Herald. The Herald was able to do this through the courtesy of Miss Annie T. Daviess, a daughter of the author. This history of Mercer and Boyle counties is of inestimable value in that it is written by an intelligent and observing woman whose early life was in touch with the last living dwellers of Harrod's Fort, and whose later life spanned the Civil War period, all her years being spent in the community of which she wrote. The Herald intends at a later date to bring the history of this community to the present time in a second volume that will include events of special note and prominent men and women of all callings.

== Selected works ==
=== Poetry ===
- "Cultivation and Uses of the Chinese Sugar-Cane"
- "The Nun"
- "A Harvest Hymn"

=== Books ===
- Poems
- Roger Sherman, A Tale of '76
- Woman's Love
- History of Mercer and Boyle Counties (1886, in the columns of the Harrodsburg Democrat)
- History of Mercer and Boyle Counties (1924; book)
