= Faizal Kottikollon =

Founder of KEF Holdings

- Born: Faizal Edavalath Kottikollon; July 6, 1963 (age 63); Mahé, India
- Occupations: Entrepreneur; Investor; Philanthropist
- Title: Chairman and Founder, KEF Holdings; Chairman of the Board, Meitra Hospital; Co-Founder, Faizal and Shabana Foundation; Chairman, UAE India Business Council - UAE Chapter
- Spouse: Shabana Faizal (m. 1992)
- Children: 4

Faizal Edavalath Kottikollon (born July 6, 1963) is a United Arab Emirates-based Indian businessperson. He is the founder and chairman of KEF Holdings.

Kottikollon was named "One of the Top 100 Indian Business Leaders in the Arab World" by Forbes Middle East and as "One of the 20 Most Influential Indian Leaders in Gulf Construction" by Construction Week.

== Early life and education ==
Kottikollon was born in Mahé, India, on July 6, 1963. His father, PK Ahammed, is the Chairman of Peekay Group of Companies.

Kottikollon attended St. Joseph's Boys' Higher Secondary School, Kozhikode, and he received his BE (1983–87) in Civil Engineering from Manipal Institute of Technology and his MBA (1988–90) in Business Administration, Management & Operations from T. A. Pai Management Institute. In 1990, Kottikollon earned a Master of Science degree in Industrial Engineering from Bradley University, Peoria, Illinois.

== Career ==
=== Emirates Techno Casting ===
With a seed capital of US$5,000, Kottikollon started his first venture, a steel scrap trading company called Al Ahamadi General Trading in Ajman in 1995. In 1997, he set up Emirates Techno Casting in Ajman with profits from his scrap trading business and the support from his father. In 2002, he founded Emirates Techno Casting FZE and JC Middle East (JCME) in the Hamriyah Free Zone in Sharjah to trade in valves. Kottikollon's wife, Shabana, joined his business in 2002, and managed the Human Resources and Administrative areas while he focused on technology and production.

In 2007, they set up the ETC Community Center, which led to the establishment of the Faizal & Shabana Foundation in 2007 as "a charitable trust which aims to leverage the business models they developed in the oil and gas sector". In the same year, Kottikollon established KEF Holdings as the parent company for the group with the "goal to provide poorer areas of the world with the education, training and healthcare they sorely lack through the use of technology and collaboration".

In 2008, Dubai International Capital (DIC), the investment arm of the government-owned Dubai Holding, acquired a 45 percent stake in Emirates Techno Casting for $126 million.

In 2011, Tyco International announced it completed the acquisition of 75% equity stake in Emirates Techno Casting, worth US$300 million, including the stake originally acquired by DIC. Tyco further acquired the remaining 25% stake, held by Kottikollon, for an additional US$100 million.

=== KEF Holdings ===
After the sale of Emirates Techno Casting to Tyco, KEF Holdings was registered in Singapore in 2012. KEF Company Ltd. was then established as the corporate headquarters of the group in Dubai’s International Financial Center.

==== KEF Infrastructure ====
Kottikollon established KEF Infrastructure India Private Limited in 2014 "for the fabrication and supply of concrete elements including columns, beams, hollow core slabs, architectural cladding panels, aggregate finished panels and staircases". His first investment in infrastructure was KEF Infra One Industrial Park, "where a network of smart factories are driven by human enterprise and cyber-physical systems". The facility was built on 42 acres of land in Krishnagiri with an investment of US$100 million, and it focuses on designing, engineering, and manufacturing buildings, including on-site assembly and project management. KEF Infra won several projects such as the 1.5 million square feet Embassy 7B in Bangalore completed in 13.5 months, the Indira Canteens in Karanataka, a 700,000 square feet office park for Infosys, and Gems Modern Academy in Kochi.
In 2018, Katerra, a US-based Softbank-backed tech firm, and KEF Infra merged to form KEF Katerra to build critical infrastructure such as hospitals and schools.

==== KEF Healthcare ====
In 2017, Kottikollon established Meitra Hospital, KEF Healthcare's first tertiary care hospital in Kozhikode, Kerala.

=== Other ===
Kottikollon is the co-founder and director of the Faizal & Shabana Foundation, established in 2007.

== Honors ==
Kottikollon has been conferred several encomiums over the past two decades.

- International Community Services Award 2012 of the Global Organization of People of Indian Origin
- Ranked among 100 Most Powerful Indians in the Gulf 2014
- Ranked among The GCC's 100 Most Powerful Indians 2014
- PV Sami Memorial Award 2016 for his valuable contribution in business and philanthropy
- Top 100 Indian Leaders in the UAE by Forbes Magazine (2016)
- Ranked in Construction Week's The 20 most influential Indian leaders of Gulf construction
- Ranked in Arabian Business Indian Aces 2018
- Ranked among 50 Most Powerful Indians in the UAE 2017
- Ranked in Arabian Business Richest Indians in the UAE 2018
