= Rosa Kershaw Walker =

American author, journalist and newspaper editor

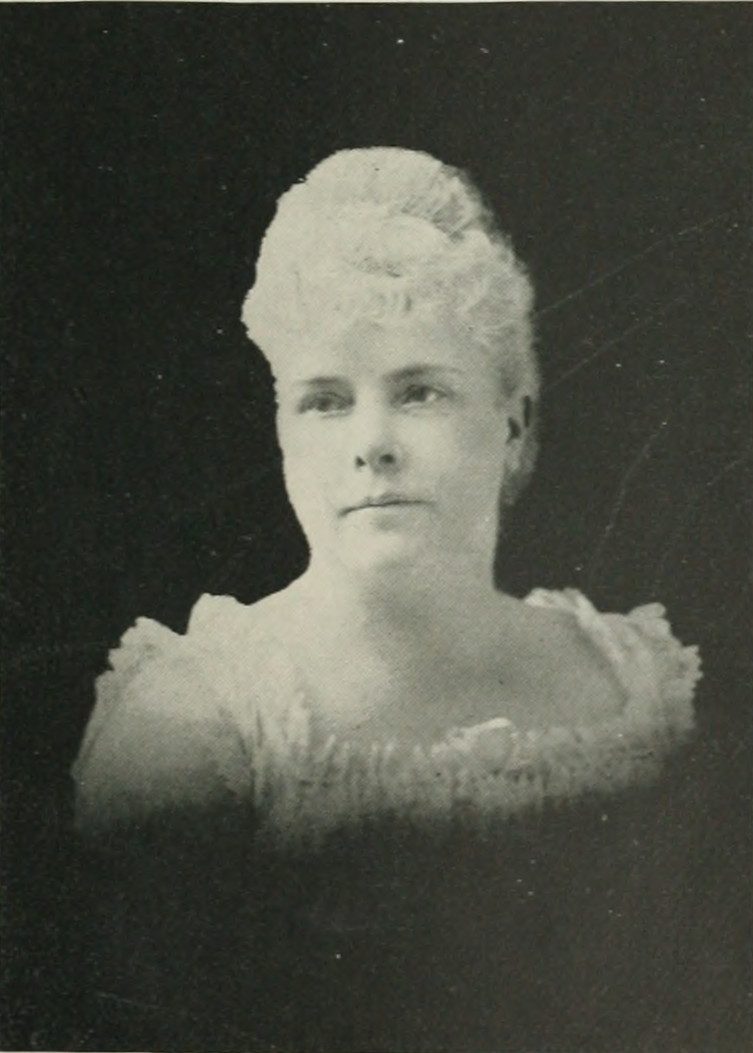
- "A Woman of the Century"
- Born: Rosa (or, Rose) Sarah Kershaw; 1840s Mississippi, U.S.
- Died: May 7, 1909; St. Louis, Missouri, U.S.
- Resting place: Bellefontaine Cemetery
- Occupations: author; journalist; editor
- Spouses: Charles Frederick Turnbull (m. 1861; died 1870); Howard Walker
- Children: 3
- Writing career
- Pen name: R. K. Walker
- Language: English
- Notable works: Americans of gentle birth and their ancestors : a genealogical encyclopedia

Rosa Kershaw Walker (née, Kershaw; after first marriage, Turnbull; after second marriage, Walker; literary initials, R. K. Walker; 1840s – May 7, 1909) was an American author, journalist, and newspaper editor of the long nineteenth century. She was one of the best-known literary women in St. Louis, Missouri, and a pioneer woman journalist of that city.

== Early life and education ==
Rosa (or, Rose) Sarah Kershaw was born in Mississippi in the 1840s. (Note: According to Walker's obituary in the St. Louis Post-Dispatch (May 7, 1909), Walker was born in Charleston, South Carolina; no year is given. According to Willard & Livermore's biography (1893), Walker was born on a plantation in Mississippi in 1847. According to the familysearch.org website, Walker was born in Mississippi in 1845, and four sources are provided. While all four of these sources record the place of birth as Mississippi, only one ("United States Census, 1880") gives the year of birth as 1845. The three other sources give other dates: September 1846 ("United States Census, 1900"), 1835 ("United States Census, 1870"), 1844 ("United States Census, 1850").) Her father was a wealthy and aristocratic Mississippi planter.

Descended from an old Charleston, South Carolina family, she was reared in a cultured and refined home. The Civil War, however, stripped her family of its fortune. She had at least two siblings, a brother, George, and a sister.

In her youth, she studied at home, near Pass Christian, Mississippi, and later, attended a seminary in New York City. After leaving school, she traveled three years in Europe, receiving part of her instruction there, including learning several modern languages.

== Career ==
On June 20, 1861, at Washington County, Mississippi, she married Charles Frederick Turnbull (1840–1870), a cotton planter of Mississippi, They had three children:

- Dr Louis Allan Turnbull (1865–1920)
- Mary (or, Marie) Rubine Turnbull (1866–1917)
- Rosa Turnbull (1868–?)

Left a widow with three young children, she utilized her liberal education and her literary talent to make a career in journalism in St. Louis.

Her second husband was Howard Walker of St. Louis.

Walker first began her literary work on the St. Louis Post-Dispatch, with which paper she remained over a year. She then joined the staff of the St. Louis Globe-Democrat. While writing the society section for the Globe-Democrat, she owned and edited Fashion and Fancy, a magazine whose topics included fashion, society, and a potpourri of matters of interest to women. This journal, while attractive in appearance and subject matter, had a short life (1889–91).

She contributed a series of sketches to Frank Leslie's Illustrated Newspaper. While she was in Europe, in 1876, she corresponded for a number of newspapers, and her European letters were widely copied.

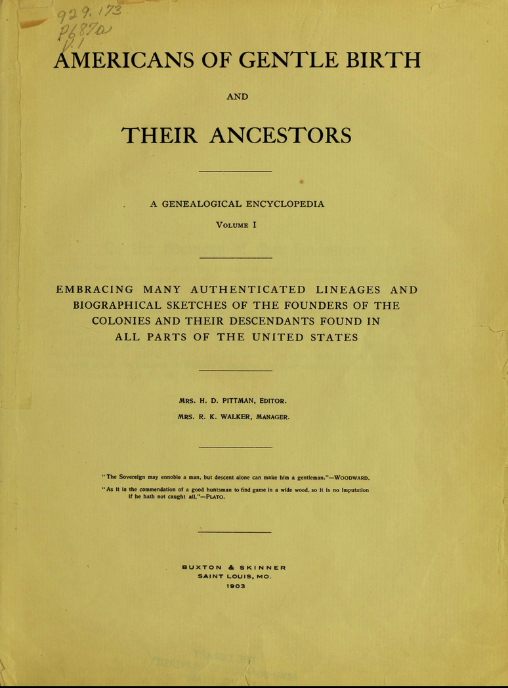
Americans of gentle birth and their ancestors (1903)

In 1903, with Hannah D. Pittman, she published Americans of gentle birth and their ancestors : a genealogical encyclopedia (St. Louis, Mo., Buxton and Skinner).

When her failing health forced her to give up the work at the Globe-Democrat, she was succeeded by her daughter, Marie Turnbull Bauduy.

== Personal life ==
Walker lived in St. Louis for 30 years, where she was a leader in society and was interested in various charities. She was a member of the United Daughters of the Confederacy.

In her later life, her health was failing for several years. She went to Macon, Georgia to spend the winter with her brother, George P. Kershaw, but her condition did not improve and she returned to St. Louis on May 3, 1909, accompanied by her daughter, Marie Bauduy. Rosa Kershaw Walker died at her home in St. Louis, May 7, 1909, after more than a year of illness, due to nervous breakdown. There were two surviving children: Marie Bauduy and Louis A. Turnbull. Burial was at Bellefontaine Cemetery.

== Selected works ==
- Americans of gentle birth and their ancestors : a genealogical encyclopedia, volume 1, embracing many authenticated lineages and biographical sketches of the founders of the Colonies and their descendants found in all parts of the United States. By Mrs. H D Pittman; Mrs. R K Walker (Saint Louis, MO : Buxton & Skinner, 1903). (Text)
