= Mario Jeckle =

German computer scientist (1974–2004)

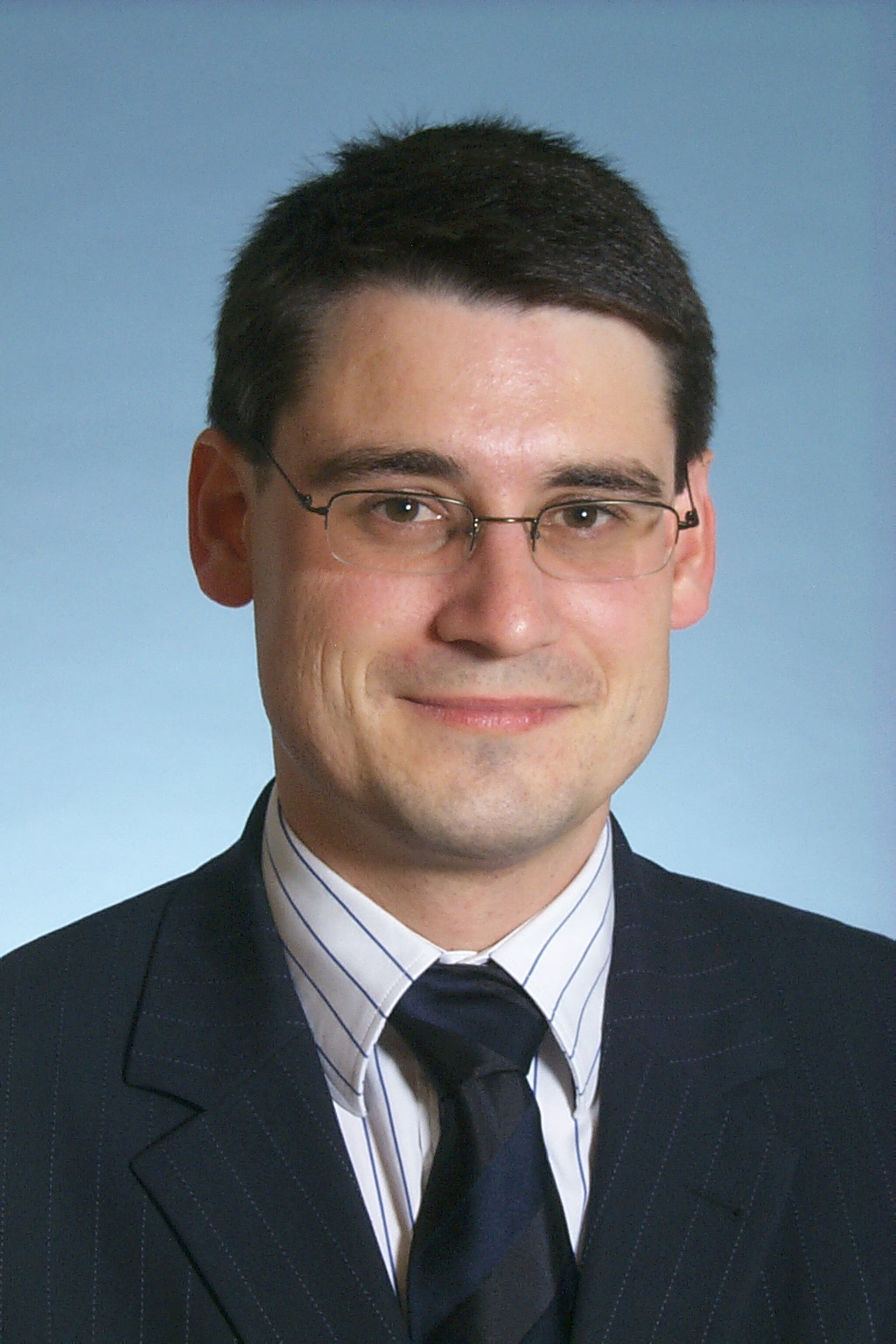
Mario Jeckle

Mario Jeckle (25 August 1974 – 11 June 2004) was a German computer scientist.

From 1997 to 2003, Jeckle attended the University of Applied Sciences in Augsburg. In 1998, he received his computer science degree for his thesis "Prozeßkettenmodellierung am Beispiel der Gießwerkzeugentwicklung und prototypische Implementierung auf Basis des EDM/PDM – Systems Metaphase" (An example of process chain modelling in casting tool development and prototype implementation on basis of the EDM/PDM – Systems Metaphase). At Augsburg, he taught Java, Java Threads, XML and software engineering.

In 2003, Jeckle became a professor at the University of Applied Sciences in Furtwangen im Schwarzwald. He taught about XML, databases, software engineering and eBusiness.

Jeckle was also a W3C and OMG representative of DaimlerChrysler Research and developed technical standards for XML, UML 2.0, and others. At the beginning of 2004, he was a member of the Technical Architecture Group of the World Wide Web Consortium (W3C). Jeckle was also an author of books and a speaker at conferences and seminars (information groups).

Jeckle was a member of the International Red Cross. On 11 June 2004, he died while giving aid to others who had a car accident on a German highway. While helping, Jeckle and a second man were hit by another driver who lost control. Tim Berners-Lee, whom Jeckle had previously collaborated with, spoke on his death, "Mario's involvement in the World Wide Web Consortium is a symbol of collaboration: with his time and talent, he has helped create a space that can be shared by people; that brings you together to learn, develop and gain new knowledge together. He helped more and more talented and creative people develop for the web. The election to the Technical Architecture Group by the W3C members was a recognition of achievements made and those expected. Mario has undertaken the difficult task of gaining a foothold in an established group with energy and enthusiasm."
