= Atkinson Hill =

American judge

Personal details
- Born: about 1755
- Died: 11 June 1824

Atkinson Hill was an American attorney and veteran of the American Revolution. Born in Virginia about 1755, he became the first Judge of Nelson County, Kentucky. He constructed his family estate, Federal Hill, in Bardstown, Kentucky in 1795. The estate was later destroyed by fire. Hill died in 1824.
