= Hannah D. Pittman =

American journalist

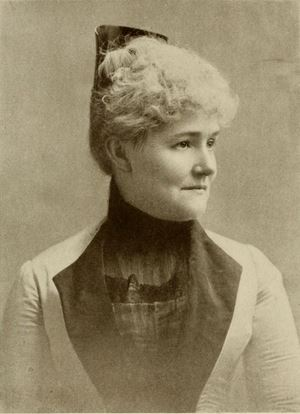
- Hannah D. Pittman
- Born: Hannah Daviess; 1840; Harrodsburg, Kentucky, United States
- Died: 1919 (aged 78–79)
- Burial place: Bellefontaine Cemetery, Saint Louis, Missouri
- Education: Presbyterian College of Harrodsburg
- Occupation: journalist
- Known for: Wrote first American comic opera
- Spouse: Williamson Haskins Pittman (m. 1857; died 1875)
- Children: 5
- Parents: Maj. William Daviess (father); Maria Thompson Daviess (mother)

Hannah Daviess Pittman (1840–1919) was for sixteen years a member of the staff of the St. Louis Post-Dispatch and during that time was also associated with the St. Louis Spectator, a weekly paper. She is also the author of the first American comic opera.

== Early life and family ==
Hannah Daviess was born in 1840, in Harrodsburg, Kentucky, the eldest daughter of Maj. William Daviess and Maria Thompson Daviess.

Maj. William Daviess lived on a beautiful estate called "Hayfields," at 122 East Poplar Street, near Harrodsburg. He was, as she described him in one of her books, a rare companion, celebrated throughout the State as a raconteur, a historian, a student of human nature, a great reader of books, as well as men; he had a strong judicial mind, having been educated for the law.

In the State Senate William Daviess represented his district for two years and at one time when offered a nomination for Congress, declined, saying that "politics sooner or later engulfs men's souls," and he might not be able to withstand the temptations offered. Thereafter, he lived the life of a "Latin farmer," with his home always open to strangers and friends. Here, Hannah Daviess spent her early life, in a beautiful, spacious home surrounded by well-kept lawns.

Her mother, Maria Thompson, was a well-known writer of her day, a regular correspondent of The Country Gentleman and Coleman's Rural World. Her last contribution for The Country Gentleman was written on her eighty-second birthday.

Hannah Daviess graduated from the Presbyterian College of Harrodsburg.

== Career ==
Pittman was for sixteen years a member of the staff of the St. Louis Post-Dispatch and during that time, was also associated with John R. Reavis as assistant editor of the St. Louis Spectator, a weekly paper founded by Joseph McCulloch, John A. Dillon and Henry W. Moore, editors of local newspapers.

While on the staff of the Post-Dispatch, Pittman wrote several children's plays for Professor Mahler, which were presented at Saratoga during the summer season, and later in 1883, in collaboration with Professor Robyn, wrote her most ambitious dramatic work, a comic opera, which was presented at the Pickwick Summer Garden Theater by a professional company, with Laetitia Fritsch in the title role. The success was so great that the author accepted the offer of Pope's Theater managers to open the regular season with "Manette." The initial ovation was repeated, and from New York City to London, was cabled the success of the first American comic opera.

Severing her connection with the St. Louis Post-Dispatch, Pittman devoted her time to magazine work. While so engaged, she wrote a number of short stories illustrating the condition between masters and slaves during and immediately after the Civil War.

In 1906, in response to a suggestion made by Hon. John Sergeant Wise, she gathered these magazine articles — "Studies in Black and White" — together, and wove about them the story, The belle of the Bluegrass Country : studies in black and white (1906). The book was widely read and for years was one of the most frequently called for in the libraries. It was placed in nearly all of the college libraries in the Southern and Western States, as of historic value, from which may be learned from one upon the firing line of memory, the truth of the amazing situation during and following the Civil War. Treating also of the feudal life before the war, which is fast passing into the silence that follows every epoch of national change, the story of The Belle of the Bluegrass Country, possessing the atmosphere and charm of a bygone people and life, attained the importance of history.

Her second book, The Heart of Kentucky (1908), told of that period when the State was almost rent in twain by two political factions. She used the framework for a strong story, a story of the time when the heart of true chivalry beat for honor and the courage of brave men and love was an exalted thing to be vindicated at the risk of all else. It is a tragic retelling of an old tale convincingly related, giving tone and color to what appears as an incident in the history of a great State. The delicate subject is carefully handled and coming, as the book did, when the Thaw tragedy was absorbing public notice, the Heart of Kentucky attracted much attention. Pittman said of her story: "It is not, as some of my critics seem to think, a vindication of the unwritten law; it is a plea for the enactment of stringent laws safeguarding the home. In an ancient little cemetery in a rural district of Central Kentucky may be found a large granite slab covering the resting-place of an unhappy couple who passed out of life together one summer morning early in the nineteenth century. Inscribed on the stone are several verses written by the wife while voluntarily occupying, contrary to all law and precedent, a cell with her husband. These verses are my motif of the tragedy."

Pittman's other stories, Go Forth and Find (1910) (inspired by Chauncey Depew's address to the graduates of the Medico-Chirurgical College at Philadelphia, May 5, 1907), Get Married, Young Men and The Heart of a Doll (1908), have proven popular successes. However, the most notable book she wrote, Americans of Gentle Birth and their Ancestors — upon which she spent six years of hard work of research — was considered one of the most valuable works of that nature in the Congressional Library in Washington.

Her last book was In dreamland : a story of living and giving (c. 1915), illustrated by Isabella Morton.

== Personal life ==
Soon after graduation, in 1857, Hannah Daviess married Williamson Haskins Pittman (1823–1875), a prominent wholesale dry goods merchant of St. Louis, senior member of the two firms — Pittman & Bro. and Pittman & Tennant — having been engaged in the early fifties with James E. Yeatman (Yeatman, Pittman & Co.) in a general commission business.

They went to live in St. Louis. It was not long thereafter that the breaking out of the Civil War changed the whole map of the business situation in St. Louis. The Southern trade being cut off these merchants were obliged to adjust their affairs to the new situations confronting them. In this process Williamson Pittman resumed his commission business and spent several years in cotton buying. On journeys to the Southern cities Hannah Pittman accompanied her husband and became so much impressed with scenes and incidents in the lives of the people with whom she came in contact that she decided to begin writing short stories, as referred to before, which were later incorporated in her first novel.

Williamson Pittman died in 1875, leaving his wife and five children, residing in St. Louis. The eldest, Nannie Trabue Pittman (1861–1936), married Archer Anderson (1859–1939), of Louisa County, Virginia. William Daviess Pittman (1863–1932), married Sarah Duncan Patterson (1862–1952), only daughter of Robert D. Patterson, and had three children, Marie D., Cora, and W. Daviess Pittman Jr. Asa Pittman married Rose Marian, only daughter of D. D. Walker. They both died young, leaving an only daughter, Martha Walker Pittman. Trabue Pittman (1870–1944) married Amy Louise Opel (1875–1976), and had one son, Richard Trabue Pittman. Williamson Haskins Pittman (1872–1901) died unmarried.

Through lineal descent from John Thompson and Lewis Robards, officers of the Revolution, Pittman was a member of the Daughters of the American Revolution. Through lineal descent from Col. William Claiborne, first secretary and treasurer of the Colonies, and many other Colonial officers, she was a Colonial Dames of America, and a Colonial Daughter of the seventeenth century'. Through John West (governor), William C. C. Claiborne and Governor Wormley she belongs to the Hereditary Order of Descendants of Colonial Governors.

Pittman died in 1919, and is buried with her husband at Bellefontaine Cemetery, Saint Louis.

== Selected works ==
- Americans of gentle birth and their ancestors : a genealogical encyclopedia, (with Rosa Kershaw Walker) (St. Louis, Mo., Buxton and Skinner, 1919) (Text)
- The belle of the Bluegrass Country : studies in black and white (1906)
- The Heart of Kentucky (1908)
- Go Forth and Find (1910)
- Get Married, Young Men
- The Heart of a Doll (1908)
- In dreamland : a story of living and giving (c. 1915)
