= Louisville Medical Institute =

Former American medical school

The Louisville Medical Institute was a medical school founded in 1837 in Louisville, Kentucky. It merged with two other colleges into the University of Louisville in 1846 and is considered the ancestor of the university's present day medical school.

The LMI was begun due to a faculty rivalry at Lexington's Transylvania University medical school, and was established by three defectors, most notably Charles Caldwell. Many of its faculty were among the best doctors in the region, and the school grew quickly, drawing students from Kentucky and several other states. The city of Louisville built the school a new building located at the present day intersection of 8th and Chestnut Streets.

In 1846, the Kentucky General Assembly merged the LMI, along with rival medical school the Louisville Collegiate Institute and a newly created law school, into the University of Louisville.
