= William Spade =

American lawyer

William Spade (born September 12, 1962) is an American criminal defense attorney in Philadelphia, Pennsylvania. His clients have included Corey Kemp, the former Treasurer of the City of Philadelphia, who was prosecuted by the United States Department of Justice for honest services fraud, Julius Murray, a private social worker, charged with involuntary manslaughter in the death of 14-year-old Danieal Kelly, who was allegedly starved to death by her mother, Andrea Kelly, and Kevin Felder, who was charged with capital murder in the shooting death of five-year-old Casha'e Rivers, but ultimately cleared.

== Grand Jury Investigation Into The Sexual Abuse of Minors by Priests in the Archdiocese of Philadelphia ==
Spade was a lead prosecutor in the Philadelphia District Attorney's grand jury investigation into the sexual abuse of minors by priests in the Archdiocese of Philadelphia. Known within the office as the God Squad, a group of prosecutors and detectives spent two years reviewing the Philadelphia Archdiocese's secret archives file which documented decades of sexual abuse of children by Philadelphia priests. Spade's role included cross-examining Cardinal Anthony Bevilacqua and other high Diocesan officials regarding their decisions to reassign priests who had sexually abused children to new parishes without warning parents of the priests' crimes. During the two years he worked on the investigation, Spade interviewed hundreds of victims of sexual abuse. "It was like working in a factory. And in this factory was a conveyor belt of damaged people. Every day was another damaged person." Exhausted, emotionally drained, and frustrated by the refusal of his superiors to indict members of the Church hierarchy, Spade resigned his position in the fall of 2004, a year before the investigation concluded, and opened a criminal defense practice.

== Notable cases ==
=== United States v. Robert Merritt, Jr. ===
Spade represented Robert Merritt, Jr., who was accused of being an associate of the ruthless Philadelphia drug kingpin, Kaboni Savage. Merritt faced six capital murder charges related to the October 9, 2004 firebombing of the home of Eugene Coleman that killed six people, Coleman was another associate of Savage's who became a government cooperator and testified against Savage in a 2005 drug conspiracy case. The firebombing was allegedly retaliation for Coleman's testimony. After a six-month trial in 2013 in the United States District Court for the Eastern District of Pennsylvania presided over by the Honorable R. Barclay Surrick, Merritt was convicted of racketeering but was acquitted of all six capital murder charges.

=== United States v. Corey Kemp ===
Spade represented Corey Kemp, the former Treasurer of the City of Philadelphia, in one of the longest and most complex public corruption trials in the history of Philadelphia. Kemp grew up fatherless in a North Philadelphia ghetto, became an all-City basketball player, attended college on a basketball scholarship, obtained an MBA, and was appointed Treasurer at the age of 35, the youngest person ever appointed to the post.

In 2003, the FBI began a wire-tap of Kemp's phones as well as the phones of Ron White, an influential fund-raiser for Mayor John F. Street, who represented investment banks seeking City bond business. The FBI also attempted to bug the office of Mayor John Street, but was unsuccessful when the bug was discovered. Soon after, the U.S. Attorney's office indicted Kemp and White charging them with honest services fraud involving a scheme to steer City bond business to banks who contributed to the re-election campaign of Mayor Street.

=== United States v. Joseph Moderski ===
Spade represented Joseph C. Moderski, a business consultant, who because of his political connections, was known as the go-to guy for companies looking to do business with the City of Philadelphia. Moderski was prosecuted in federal court for his part in an influence-peddling scheme related to contracts at Philadelphia International Airport. He pleaded guilty and received a sentence of 14 months imprisonment.

=== United States v. Joseph Logue ===
Spade represented Joseph Logue, a former Philadelphia police officer, who was charged with mail fraud and money laundering in connection with a scheme to defraud members of the posh Whitemarsh Valley Country Club out of $2 million. Logue pleaded guilty and at sentencing Spade put forward extensive evidence that Logue, a decorated Vietnam Marine helicopter tailgunner, suffered from Post-Traumatic Stress Syndrome, which caused an uncontrollable compulsion to engage in highly risky behavior such as the fraud scheme. Logue was sentenced to 30 months imprisonment, which was significantly above the Guidelines range sentence he faced at the beginning of the case.

=== United States v. Joseph Davis ===
Spade represented Joseph Davis, a rap artist and producer who ran a studio called 88 Breaks and promoted concerts by rap artists such as Run-D.M.C. and Biggie Smalls. Davis pleaded guilty to tampering with a cooperating government witness by having fliers identifying the witness as a "snitch" and a "rat" placed on telephone poles and car windshields in his West Philadelphia neighborhood. Davis pleaded guilty and was sentenced to 37 months imprisonment.

== Scholarly writing ==
Spade was an early advocate for the abolition of the so-called "100:1 ratio" which punished criminal defendants convicted of crack cocaine offenses much more harshly than those convicted of powder cocaine offenses. The disparate treatment effected by this law was particularly egregious because the result was to punish African-American defendants more harshly than white defendants. Spade's Arizona Law Review article advocating a decrease in the 100:1 ratio was cited in the testimony before the United States Sentencing Commission of Irwin H. Schwartz, President of the National Association of Criminal Defense Lawyers (NACDL) in which Schwartz urged a reform of the cocaine sentencing laws. Eleven years later, Spade was proven correct when the United States Supreme Court held that federal courts were not constrained to impose the 100:1 ratio when sentencing defendants in crack cocaine cases if they found that the sentence was greater than necessary to achieve the purposes of sentencing. Spade's article was cited in the Amicus Curiae Brief of the NAACP's Legal Defense & Educational Fund, Inc. filed with the Supreme Court in the Kimbrough case.
