= Joseph Davis (explorer) =

Joseph Davis, (fl. 1692 – 1715), was a Hudson's Bay Company employee intermittently during that period.

History records Davis accompanying Captain James Knight when Fort Albany was recaptured from the French during an expedition in 1692–1693. He was in James Bay again in 1702-03 and a number of subsequent voyages, commanding his own ship from 1710 and forward. In 1715, he was unsuccessful in re-supplying Fort York where James Knight was now governor. He was unable to approach closer than 15 miles, no doubt because of ice and weather conditions. A years lost trade was a big blow to the HBC and they dismissed Davis.

This was the last written record of a man who had performed some very important tasks in the north and who ultimately is remembered for a failure which most certainly was beyond his control.
