= Henry Crist =

American politician

Henry Crist (October 20, 1764 – August 11, 1844) was a United States representative from Kentucky. He was born in Fredericksburg, Virginia. He moved with his father to Pennsylvania, where he attended the public schools. Later, he moved to Kentucky and engaged in the surveying of lands. As early as 1779–80, Crist began coming down the Ohio River from Pennsylvania to as far as the Falls of the Ohio, at present day Louisville. In 1788, he moved to Bullitt County, Kentucky and engaged in the manufacture of salt.

Crist was a member of the Kentucky House of Representatives in 1795 and 1806. He also served in the Kentucky Senate 1800–1804. He was elected as a Democratic-Republican to the Eleventh Congress (March 4, 1809 – March 3, 1811) and was later a Whig after the organization of that party. He died near Shepherdsville, Kentucky in 1844 and was buried there. Later, the Kentucky Legislature had his remains moved to the Frankfort Cemetery, and erected a monument over his grave.

U.S. House of Representatives
Preceded by John Rowan	Member of the U.S. House of Representatives from Kentucky's 3rd congressional district 1809–1811	Succeeded by Stephen Ormsby
