= Joe Davis (footballer, born 1938) =

English footballer

Personal information
- Date of birth: 24 August 1938
- Place of birth: Bristol, England
- Date of death: 26 November 2018 (aged 80)
- Place of death: Bristol, England
- Height: 5 ft 11 in (1.80 m)
- Position: Defender

Youth career
- Soundwell

Senior career*
Years	Team	Apps	(Gls)
1960–1967	Bristol Rovers	211	(4)
1967–1968	Swansea Town	38	(0)
Total		249	(4)
- * Club domestic league appearances and goals

Joseph T. Davis (24 August 1938 - 26 November 2018) was a professional footballer who played as a defender for Bristol Rovers and Swansea Town (now known as Swansea City).

Davis was discovered playing youth football for Soundwell, and was signed by Bristol Rovers in 1960. He spent seven years with The Pirates and played 211 League games, scoring four times, and was the club captain in the mid-1960s.

He moved to Swansea Town in March 1967, but suffered a career-ending Achilles tendon injury having made 38 league appearances for the Welsh club, whereupon he returned to Bristol Rovers as a youth development coach and scout. While coaching Rovers' youth players he worked with a group of players including Paul Randall, Gary Penrice and Ian Holloway.

After ten years working as a coach and scout Davis left Rovers in 1978 and became a newsagent for approximately 18 months, before working for the Bristol Evening Post where he remained for thirty years.

Davis died on 26 November 2018, at the age of 80.
