= Jo Davis =

Jo Davis may refer to:

- Jo Ann Davis, politician
- Jo Davis (EastEnders)

== See also ==
- Joanne Davis, activist
- Joe Davis (disambiguation)
