= Joseph G. Davis =

- Born: October 8, 1953; Mysore, India
- Education: University of Pittsburgh; Indian Institute of Management Ahmedabad; Calicut University
- Known for: Crowdsourcing; Human Computation; Knowledge Management; Ontologies; Service Computing
- Awards: National Science Talent Scholar (India); IBM Faculty Research Award
- Scientific career
- Fields: Information Systems; Service Computing; Semantic Web; Knowledge Management
- Workplaces: University of Sydney; University of Pittsburgh

Joseph G. Davis (born 1953) is an Indian-born, Australian Information systems researcher, and Professor of Information Systems and Services, and Director of the Knowledge Discovery and Management Research Group (KDMRG) at the University of Sydney in Sydney, Australia. He is known for his work on decision support systems, ontologies, semantic technologies, and technological and organizational approaches to discovering and sharing knowledge in organizations.

== Biography ==
Davis completed the first stage of education from St. Joseph's boys higher secondary school, Kozhikode. He completed his PhD at the University of Pittsburgh in 1986 under the supervision of William R. King. Prior to this, he earned his Masters at the Indian Institute of Management, Ahmedabad (IIMA), India, and Bachelor of Science (BSc) in Mathematics and Statistics at St. Joseph’s College, Devagiri, Calicut University as a National Science Talent Scholar.

He worked for four years in industry middle management roles in India before starting his PhD research. He has previously served in the Information Systems departments at Indiana University Bloomington, Indiana, United States, the University of Auckland, Auckland, New Zealand, and University of Wollongong, Wollongong, Australia. Davis has held Visiting Professorships or Visiting Researcher positions at the University of Pittsburgh and Carnegie Mellon University in Pittsburgh, Syracuse University, Syracuse, Moscow State University, Moscow, and IBM Research Laboratories in Bangalore, India, and Newcastle University, Newcastle upon Tyne, UK.

At the School of Information Technologies, the University of Sydney, Davis was instrumental in launching the Knowledge Discovery and Management Research Group and starting the Master of Information Technology Management (MITM) course and revising the Information Systems major at the undergraduate level. He has served as the Associate Dean (International) in the Faculty of Engineering and Information Technologies at the University of Sydney from 2010 to 2013 and as Associate Head of School (of Information Technologies) from 2002 to 2007. He is also the theme leader for Service Computing at the Centre for Distributed and High Performance Computing at the University of Sydney.

== Research ==
Davis’s research interests and contributions span knowledge management including ontologies, Knowledge Graphs, service computing, and crowdsourcing/human computation. His research has been funded by the Australian Research Council, Carnegie Bosch Institute, and the Cooperative Research Centre (CRC) for Smart Services, among others. He was a National Science Talent Scholar in Mathematics in India and was awarded the IBM Faculty Research Award in 2008.

Davis has published two books and over one hundred refereed research papers in these and related areas.

The research performed by his lab, KDMRG, spans knowledge discovery and management, ontologies, data mining, service computing and service systems, crowdsourcing and human computation, and Linked Open Data.

== Publications ==
Books

- Knowledge Management: Organizational and Technological Dimensions, Heidelberg: Springer Verlag, 2005 (edited book, with E. Subrahmanian and A. Westerberg)
- Implementing Decision Support Systems: Methods, Techniques, and Tools, London: McGraw Hill, 2000 (with A. Srinivasan and D. Sundaram)

Selected Research Papers

- Meymandpour, R., Davis, J. (2019). Measuring the diversity of recommendations: a preference-aware approach for evaluating and adjusting diversity. Knowledge and Information Systems, 2019, https://doi.org/10.1007/s10115-019-01371-0
- Moghaddam, M., Davis, J. (2019). Simultaneous service selection for multiple composite service requests: A combinatorial auction approach. Decision Support Systems, 120(May 2019), 81-94. [More Information]
- Renard, D., Davis, J. (2019). Social interdependence on crowdsourcing platforms [Forthcoming]. International Journal of Business Research, 103, 186-194
- Meymandpour, R. and J. Davis, A Semantic Similarity Measure for Linked Data: An Information Content-Based Approach, Knowledge-Based Systems, October 2016.
- JG. Davis, From Crowdsourcing to Crowdservicing, IEEE Internet Computing 15 (3), 92-94
- JG Davis, E Subrahmanian, AW Westerberg, The “global” and the “local” in knowledge management, Journal of Knowledge Management, 2005.
- Lin, Huairen; Davis, Joseph (2010). "Computational and Crowdsourcing Methods for Extracting Ontological Structure from Folksonomy". The Semantic Web: Research and Applications. 6089: 472–477. doi:10.1007/978-3-642-13489-0_46.
- G Pandey, S Chawla, S Poon, B Arunasalam, JG Davis, Association Rule Networks: Definition and Applications, Statistical Analysis and Data Mining 1 (4), 260-279, 2009.
- J. Davis and S. Ganeshan, Aversion to Loss and Information Overload, Research paper, Proceedings of the International Conference on Information Systems (ICIS2009), Phoenix AZ, December 15–18, 2009.
- K de Souza, J Davis, S de Medeiros Evangelista, Aligning Ontologies, Evaluating Concept Similarities and Visualizing Results, Journal on Data Semantics V, 211-236, 2006
- JG Davis, E Subrahmanian, S Konda, H Granger, M Collins, AW Westerberg, Creating Shared Information Spaces to support Collaborative Design Work, Information Systems Frontiers 3 (3), 377-392, 2001.
- D. Batra, J.G. Davis. "Conceptual data modelling in database design: similarities and differences between expert and novice designers." International Journal of Man-Machine Studies 37 (1), 83-101 (1992)
- Y. Zhou, J. Davis. "Open source software reliability model: an empirical approach." ACM SIGSOFT Software Engineering Notes 30 (4), 1-6 (2005)
- B. Choi, S.K. Poon, J.G. Davis. "Effects of knowledge management strategy on organizational performance: a complementarity theory-based approach." Omega 36 (2), 235-251 (2008)
