= Jo Daviess Township, Faribault County, Minnesota =

Township in Minnesota, United States

Jo Daviess Township
- Township
- Location within the state of Minnesota Jo Daviess Township (the United States)
- Coordinates: 43°38′N 94°12′W
- Country: United States
- State: Minnesota
- County: Faribault

Area
  - Total: 36.0 sq mi (93.2 km^{2})
  - Land: 35.9 sq mi (93.1 km^{2})
  - Water: 0.039 sq mi (0.1 km^{2})
- Elevation: 1,099 ft (335 m)

Population (2000)
  - Total: 281
  - Density: 7.8/sq mi (3/km^{2})
- Time zone: UTC-6 (Central (CST))
  - Summer (DST): UTC-5 (CDT)
- FIPS code: 27-31976
- GNIS feature ID: 0664584

Jo Daviess Township is a township in Faribault County, Minnesota, United States. The population was 281 at the 2000 census. The township was named for Major Joseph Hamilton Daveiss (1774–1811), who was killed at the Battle of Tippecanoe.

== Geography ==
According to the United States Census Bureau, the township has a total area of 36.0 square miles (93 km^{2}), of which 35.9 square miles (93 km^{2}) is land and 0.04 square miles (0.10 km^{2}) (0.11%) is water.

== Demographics ==
As of the census of 2000, there were 281 people, 107 households, and 78 families residing in the township. The population density was 7.8 inhabitants per square mile (3.0/km^{2}). There were 118 housing units at an average density of 3.3 per square mile (1.3/km^{2}). The racial makeup of the township was 91.81% White, 0.71% African American, 0.71% Native American, 4.63% from other races, and 2.14% from two or more races. Hispanic or Latino of any race were 9.61% of the population.

There were 107 households, out of which 37.4% had children under the age of 18 living with them, 63.6% were married couples living together, 3.7% had a female householder with no husband present, and 26.2% were non-families. 24.3% of all households were made up of individuals, and 9.3% had someone living alone who was 65 years of age or older. The average household size was 2.63 and the average family size was 3.15.

In the township the population was spread out, with 28.1% under the age of 18, 7.8% from 18 to 24, 30.6% from 25 to 44, 17.4% from 45 to 64, and 16.0% who were 65 years of age or older. The median age was 38 years. For every 100 females, there were 132.2 males. For every 100 females age 18 and over, there were 117.2 males.

The median income for a household in the township was $33,750, and the median income for a family was $35,625. Males had a median income of $30,938 versus $19,625 for females. The per capita income for the township was $13,220. About 11.7% of families and 12.4% of the population were below the poverty line, including 15.8% of those under the age of eighteen and 5.6% of those 65 or over.
