= Viscount Mount Cashell =

Irish viscountcy

Viscount Mount Cashell was a title that was created twice in the Peerage of Ireland. The first creation came in 1706 in favour of Paul Davys. He was made Baron Mount Cashell at the same time, also in the Peerage of Ireland. The titles became extinct on the death of the third Viscount in 1736. The second creation came in 1766 in favour of Stephen Moore. For more information on this creation, see Earl Mount Cashell.

The title Viscount Mount Cashell was also created in the Jacobite peerage in 1689 in favour of Justin MacCarthy. He was made Baron Castleinch at the same time. Both titles became extinct on his death in 1694. Paul Davys, who adopted the same title, had married Catherine MacCarthy, sister of the head of Justin's family, the 4th Earl of Clancarty.

== Viscounts Mount Cashell; First creation (1706) ==
- Paul Davys, 1st Viscount Mount Cashell (died 1716)
- James Davys, 2nd Viscount Mount Cashell (1710–1719)
- Edward Davys, 3rd Viscount Mount Cashell (1711–1736)

== Viscounts Mount Cashell; Second creation (1766) ==
- see Earl Mount Cashell
