= Secretary of State (Ireland) =

Ireland Secretary of State
- Coat of Arms of the Kingdom of Ireland from 1542 to 1800
- Member of: Privy Council of Ireland
- Seat: Dublin Castle, Dublin
- Appointer: Chief governor of Ireland
- Term length: No fixed term
- Formation: 1560–1801
- First holder: John Challoner
- Final holder: Charles Abbot, 1st Baron Colchester

The principal secretary of state, or principal secretary of the council, was a government office in the Kingdom of Ireland. It was abolished in 1801 when Ireland became part of the United Kingdom of Great Britain and Ireland under the Acts of Union 1800.

The post was created in May 1560 by the Lord Deputy of Ireland, Thomas Radclyffe, 3rd Earl of Sussex. Sussex created the role to help re-establish English governance in Ireland, as part of the wider Tudor conquest of Ireland. The role was modelled in part on the role of Secretary of State in England, and was intended to be distinct from the clerks of the Irish Privy Council or the Governor's Private Secretary. Whilst the nature of the role evolved other time, originally the holder was expected to:

- chair the Privy Council of Ireland
- engage in regular full correspondence with the crown

Other, less common functions included:

- directing clerks of the Privy Council of Ireland
- charging treasons and seditious libels
- ordering the Postmaster General of Ireland to open letters
- offering advice on matters of state to the chief governor of Ireland (Lord Deputy, later Lord Lieutenant)

In part due to the absence of the Southwells during their time in the role, it became largely ceremonial, with more correspondence being managed directly by the lord lieutenant and his chief secretary, or alternatively the lords justices (who themselves became defunct after 1765). Richard Cooke, for instance, acted as both Chancellor of the Exchequer of Ireland and Secretary of State at the same time. The last three Secretaries of State also held the more powerful position of Chief Secretary. No secretary of state was appointed after the 1800 Acts of Union; in 1802 the last appointee resigned to become Speaker of the UK House of Commons.

== List of secretaries ==
- by 1576: John Challoner
- 1581: Sir Geoffrey Fenton and another
- 1603: Sir Richard Cooke
- 1612: Sir Dudley Norton
- 1616: Francis Annesley, 1st Baron Mountnorris
- 1634: Philip Mainwaring
- 1661: Sir Paul Davys (granted the office in reversion after Mainwaring)
- 1665: George Lane, 1st Viscount Lanesborough (in reversion after Davys)
- 1678: Sir John Davys (in reversion after Lane)
- 1690: Sir Robert Southwell
- 1702: Edward Southwell Sr.
- 1730: Edward Southwell Jr.
- 1744: William Lingen Esqr.
- 1755: Thomas Carter
- 1763: Philip Tisdall
- 1766: John Hely-Hutchinson (in reversion, succeeded 1777)
- 1796: Thomas Pelham
  - Baron Glentworth (1795–97) and Lord Castlereagh (1797–1801) were Keeper of the Signet or Privy Seal of Ireland during Pelham's term; other Secretaries of State held the office of Keeper simultaneously)
- 1801: Charles Abbot (vacated office in 1802 when appointed Speaker of the UK Commons)

== See also ==
- Privy Council of Ireland
- Chief Secretary for Ireland
- Secretary of State (United Kingdom)
