= Joseph Hamilton Daveiss =

American lawyer (1774–1811)

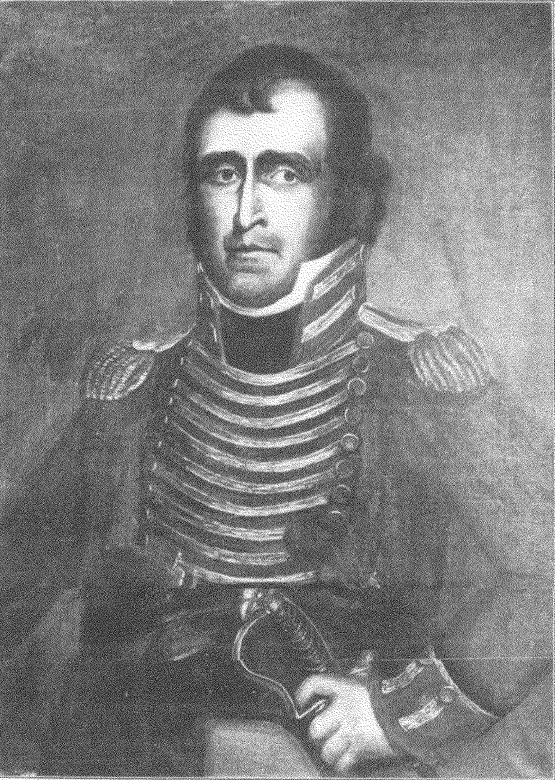
- Portrait of Daveiss by James Peale
- Born: Joseph Hamilton Daveiss; March 1774; Bedford County, Colony of Virginia, British America
- Died: November 7, 1811 (aged 37); Tippecanoe County, Indiana, U.S.
- Burial place: Tippecanoe County, Indiana, U.S.
- Spouse: Ann Marshall (m. 1803)
- Military career
- Branch: United States Army; Indiana Territory, Militia
- Service years: 1811
- Commands: Dragoon Reserve
- Conflicts: Tecumseh's War; Battle of Tippecanoe †

Joseph Hamilton Daveiss (/ˈdeɪvɪs/; March 1774 – November 7, 1811), a Virginia-born lawyer, received a mortal wound while commanding the Dragoons of the Kentucky Militia at the Battle of Tippecanoe. Five years earlier, Daveiss had tried to warn President Thomas Jefferson about the Burr conspiracy, a plan by Aaron Burr to provoke rebellion in Spanish-held territories southwest of his Kentucky district.

== Early and family life ==
Joseph Hamilton Daveiss was born on March 1 (or 4), 1774, in Bedford County, Virginia, to Jean/Joan (née Hamilton) and Joseph Daveiss. He moved at a young age with his parents to Kentucky, first to Lincoln County. The family eventually settled near Danville in Boyle County. He studied classics at a private academy in Harrodsburg with Jesse Bledsoe, Felix Grundy, Archibald Cameron and John Pope. He then studied with Dr. Culbertson. In 1793, he volunteered in a six-month military campaign against Native Americans following a call for volunteers by John Adair. At the end of the campaign, he received an officer's commission and declined commission in the regular army to study law. He studied law under George Nicholas. While studying law, he became associated with Pope, Bledsoe, John Rowan, Thomas Dye Owings, Isham Talbot and John Stewart.

== Legal career ==
Admitted to the Kentucky bar in 1795, Daveiss settled in Danville but also practiced in nearby locations. He became known for his eccentricities, not accompanying other lawyers "riding the circuit" but riding through the backcountry alone, and often appeared in court dressed as a backwoodsman. He was known to use sarcasm in court and referring to judges with names like "Your Solemnity", "Your Asininity", "Your Pomposity" and "Your Stupidity". He was aligned with the Federalist political party. Like many Kentucky lawyers, Daveiss owned enslaved people, seven in the 1810 census.

Daveiss assisted John Rowan as his second in a duel, in which Rowan mortally wounded his antagonist James Chambers, then fled, so Daveiss also became a fugitive for a time. When Rowan turned himself into authorities, Daveiss defended him at trial, and achieved an acquittal. Daveiss became the first lawyer west of the Appalachian Mountains to argue a case before the United States Supreme Court.

Following his trip to Washington, D.C., Daveiss was appointed as United States Attorney for Kentucky by President John Adams. In February and March 1806, as U.S. Attorney, he wrote President Thomas Jefferson several letters warning him of possible conspiratorial activities by Aaron Burr, who at that point was a former vice president of the United States. Daveiss' July 14 letter to Jefferson stated flatly that Burr planned to provoke a rebellion in Spanish-held parts of the West in order to join them to areas in the Southwest to form an independent nation under his rule. Similar accusations were appearing against local Democratic-Republicans in a Frankfort, Kentucky newspaper Western World, and Jefferson dismissed Daveiss' accusations against Burr, a Democratic-Republican, as politically motivated.

On November 3, 1806, Daveiss brought treason charges against Burr in Kentucky. The charges were, however, dismissed thanks to the help of Burr's attorney, Henry Clay. Burr faced federal charges of treason in 1807 but was acquitted at trial, which made Daveiss unpopular. He published "A View of the President's Conduct concerning the Conspiracy of 1806" in 1807.

== Battle of Tippecanoe ==
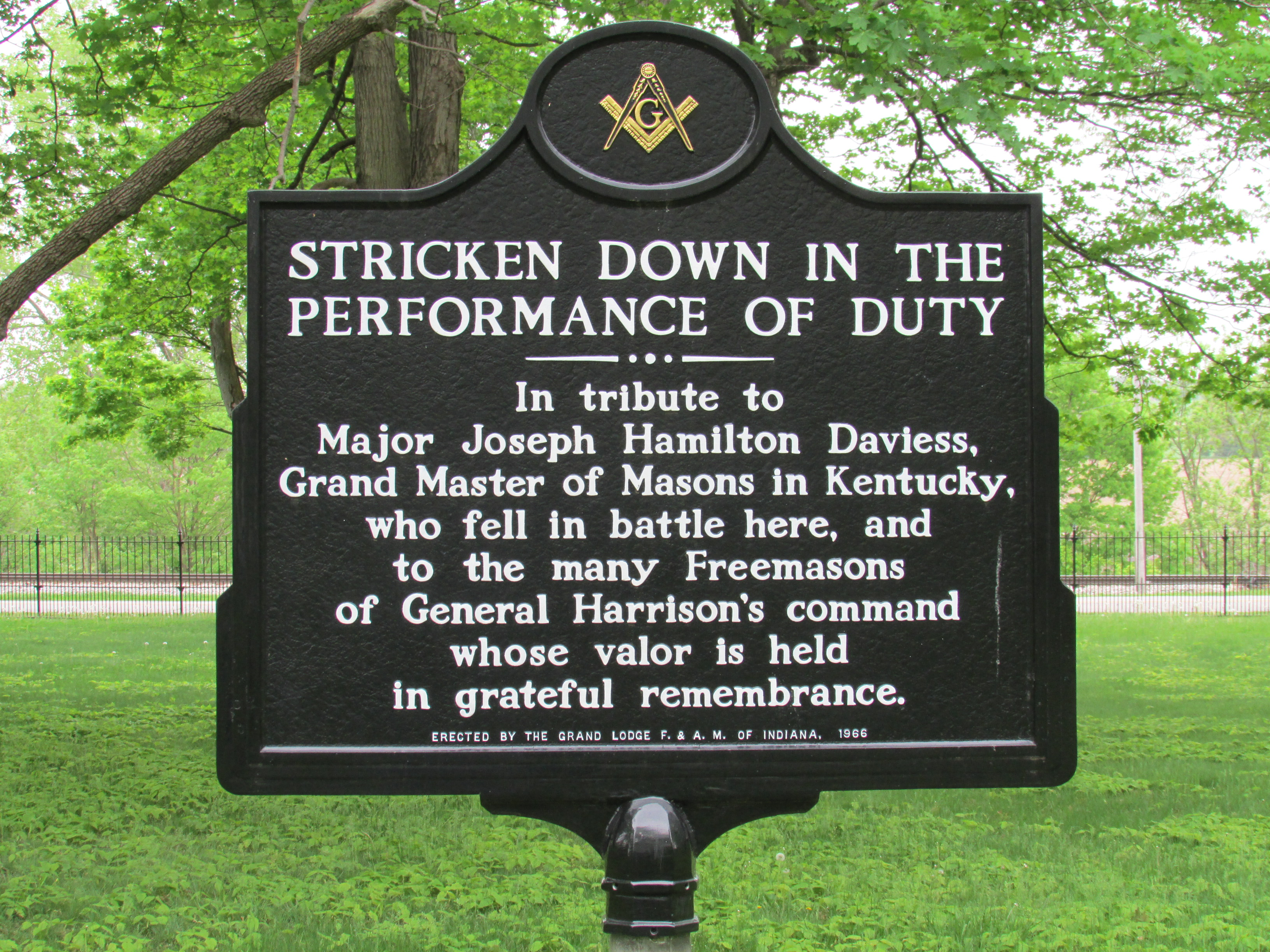
Memorial to Daveiss at Tippecanoe

In 1811, Daveiss volunteered to serve in the Indiana militia, answering Governor Harrison's call for troops to march against Tecumseh's village at Prophetstown. He was placed in command as a major of two companies of dragoons, and all the cavalry in Harrison's army.

On the night of November 6, 1811, Harrison's army made camp near Prophetstown. Major Daveiss' dragoons occupied a position in the rear of the left flank. The dragoons were instructed to fight dismounted, with pistols, as a reserve in the event of a night attack. When the Indians attacked early the next morning, Daveiss advanced with a small detachment of 20 men. He was mortally wounded in the process and died soon after. He was buried where he fell. The Tippecanoe battlefield has a memorial marker as well as a gravestone.

At the time of the Battle of Tippecanoe, Daveiss was serving as the Grand Master of Masons of the Grand Lodge of Kentucky. He was a member of Lexington Lodge #1. Daveiss's sword from the battle was given to the Masonic Widow and Orphans' Home in Louisville.

== Personal life ==
Daveiss married Chief Justice John Marshall's sister Ann in June 1803. Around 1800, he moved to Frankfort. For a time, he lived in the home of Kentucky secretary of state Harry Toulmin in Frankfort.

== Namesake places ==
Several places in the United States are named for Daveiss, but though he spelled his name "Daveiss", these places all have the spelling "Daviess".

- Jo Daviess County, Illinois
- Daviess County, Indiana
- Daviess County, Kentucky
- Daviess County, Missouri
- Jo Daviess Township, Minnesota
