= Reversion (law) =

Future interest that is retained by the grantor

A reversion in property law is a future interest that is retained by the grantor after the conveyance of an estate of a lesser quantum than he has (such as the owner of a fee simple granting a life estate or a leasehold estate). Once the lesser estate comes to an end (the lease expires or the life estate tenant dies), the property automatically reverts (hence reversion) back to the grantor.

== Territorial reversion ==
Unlike private-law reversion, territorial reversion concerns sovereign rights over states or principalities and was common in early modern and nineteenth-century Europe. It is a principle of public and dynastic law by which a territory returns to a previous sovereign or ruling house upon the extinction of a ruling line or the occurrence of a condition provided for in treaties, dynastic statutes, or acts of investiture.
