= Breckinridge (surname) =

Breckinridge is a surname, and may refer to:

- Aida de Acosta (née Breckinridge, 1884–1962), in 1903 flew Santos Dumont's dirigible airship
- Cabell Breckinridge (1788–1823), lawyer and politician in Kentucky
- Clifton R. Breckinridge (1846–1932), congressman from Kentucky, Minister to Russia, son of John C. Breckinridge
- Desha Breckinridge (1867–1935), editor and publisher of the Lexington Herald, husband of Madeline McDowell Breckinridge and brother of Sophonisba Breckinridge
- Henry Skillman Breckinridge (1886–1960), lawyer, politician, and Olympic fencer
- James Breckinridge (1763–1833), Virginia lawyer and politician, Revolutionary War soldier and brigadier general in the War of 1812
- James Carson Breckinridge (1877–1942), United States Marine Corps officer
- James D. Breckinridge (died 1849), U.S. Representative from Kentucky
- John Breckinridge (U.S. Attorney General) (1760–1806), United States Senator and Attorney General
- John B. Breckinridge (1913–1979), Attorney General of Kentucky and member of the United States House of Representatives
- John C. Breckinridge (1821–1875), Senator from Kentucky, fourteenth Vice President of the United States, and later Confederate general and the last Confederate Secretary of War
- John Cabell Breckinridge, best known as Bunny Breckinridge, American actor
- Joseph Cabell Breckinridge Sr. (1842–1920), officer in the United States Navy in the Spanish–American War
- Madeline McDowell Breckinridge (1872–1920), Kentucky suffragette, reformer, and wife of Desha Breckinridge
- Mary Carson Breckinridge (1881–1965), founder of the Frontier Nursing Service
- Mary Cyrene Burch Breckinridge (1826–1907), wife of John C. Breckinridge and Second Lady of the United States
- Robert Jefferson Breckinridge (1800–1871), 1860 supporter of Lincoln over his nephew John C. Breckinridge
- Sophonisba Breckinridge (1866–1948), American activist
- William Campbell Preston Breckinridge (1837–1904), Confederate general and U.S. Representative from Kentucky
- William Robertson "Bill" Breckinridge (1907–1958), Major League pitcher, briefly, and longtime Tulsa attorney
