= Breckinridge family =

The Breckinridge family is a family of public figures from the United States. The family has included six members of the United States House of Representatives, two United States Senators, a cabinet member, two ambassadors, one United States Vice President, and one unsuccessful candidate for United States President. Breckinridges have served as college presidents, prominent ministers, soldiers, and theologians and in important positions at state and local levels. The family was most notable in Kentucky and most prominent during the 19th century, with it being especially prominent in the American Civil War.

== Prominent members ==
- Alexander Breckenridge (1686–1743). An Ulster-Scots and first Breckenridge in the New World. Emigrated to Philadelphia, Pennsylvania c. 1728. Married to Jane Preston in 1695 in County Londonderry, Ireland. She was sister of Robert Preston, first Speaker of the Kentucky House of Representatives.
- Robert Breckenridge Sr. (1720–1773), here termed Colonel Robert Breckenridge. Captain in Virginia militia during the French and Indian War. Son of Alexander Breckenridge I. Married first Mary Poage, daughter of Robert Poage and Elizabeth Preston. After his first wife's death Breckenridge married second, his first cousin Letitia Preston.
- Alexander Breckenridge (1752–1801), son of Robert Breckenridge and Mary Poage, here termed Captain Alexander Breckenridge. Married wealthy widow Jane (Buchanan) Floyd whose son John Floyd was Governor of Virginia. Alexander and Jane had three sons: James Douglas Breckenridge, Henry Brown Breckenridge, and Robert Breckenridge.
- Robert Breckenridge (1754–1833), son of Col. Robert Breckenridge and Mary Poage, Revolutionary War General. Ratifier of the United States Constitution. Kentucky State Representative 1792–1795. Speaker of the Kentucky House of Representatives. Brother of Captain Alexander Breckenridge; half-brother of John Breckinridge and James Breckinridge. Robert Breckenridge never married. Nota Bene: During his lifetime Colonel Robert Breckenridge spelled his surname as shown here, as did his father Alexander Breckenridge I. His sons by Leticia Preston, (i.e. James and John) began spelling the family name 'Breckinridge'.
- John Breckinridge (1760–1806), Member of House of Burgesses, U.S. District Attorney of Kentucky 1793–1794, Attorney General of Kentucky 1793–1797, Kentucky State Representative 1788–1790 1799–1801, delegate to the Kentucky Constitutional Convention 1799, U.S. Senator from Kentucky 1801–1805, United States Attorney General under Thomas Jefferson 1805–1806. Married Mary Hopkins Cabell in 1785. Half-brother of Alexander and Robert Breckenridge, brother of James Breckinridge, Son of Colonel Robert Breckinridge and Letitia Preston.
- James Breckinridge (1763–1833), Virginia House Delegate 1789–1802 1806–1808 1819–1821 1823–1824, member of the U.S. House of Representatives from Virginia 1809–1817. Brother of John Breckinridge, Son of Robert Breckinridge and Letitia Preston.
- Letitia Breckinridge, Daughter of John Breckinridge. Married first to Alfred William Grayson in 1804, who was a graduate of Cambridge University, lawyer, son of Senator William Grayson of Virginia. He died in 1810. Married second to Peter B. Porter (1773–1844), New York Assemblyman 1802 and 1828, U.S. Representative from New York 1809–1813 and 1815–1816, New York Secretary of State 1815–1816, U.S. Secretary of War 1828–1829.
- James Douglas Breckinridge (1781–1849), son of Captain Alexander Breckenridge and Jane (Buchanan) Breckenridge (d. 1849), member of Kentucky House of Representatives (1809–11) and the U.S. House of Representatives (1821–23).
- Joseph "Cabell" Breckinridge I (1788–1823), Major in War of 1812. Kentucky State Representative 1817–1818, Speaker of the Kentucky House of Representatives. Kentucky Secretary of State 1820–1823. Married Mary Clay Smith, daughter of Samuel Stanhope Smith, President of Princeton University. Son of John Breckinridge.
- Rev. John A. Breckinridge, D. D. (1797–1841) Born at Cabell's Dale, son of John Breckinridge. Presbyterian minister. Graduated Princeton College 1818, Princeton Theological Seminary 1821. Married in 1823 Margaret, daughter of Rev. Samuel Miller D. D.
- Robert Jefferson Breckinridge (1800–1871). Kentucky State Representative 1825–1828, Kentucky Superintendent of Public Instruction 1849–1853, candidate for delegate to the Kentucky Constitutional Convention 1849. Presbyterian minister. Son of John Breckinridge. Married Ann Sophonisba Preston in 1823.
- Rev. William Lewis Breckinridge, D. D. (1803–1876). Born at Cabell's Dale, Fayette County, Kentucky. Presbyterian minister for 45 years. Moderator of the General Assembly of the Presbyterian Council. Son of John Breckinridge. Married Frances Prevost in 1823, granddaughter of Samuel Stanhope Smith, President of Princeton University.
- General John Breckinridge Grayson (1806–1862) Born at Cabell's Dale, Fayette County, Kentucky. Son of Letitia Preston Breckinridge and Alfred William Grayson. Graduated United States Military Academy, 1826. Lieutenant Colonel U.S. Army at the outbreak of the Civil War; resigned in 1861, entered the CSA. and was commissioned Brigadier General. Died while in command of the coastal defenses of Georgia and Florida, in Tallahassee, in 1862.
- John Cabell Breckinridge (1821–1875) Major in the United States Army 1847–48. Member of the Kentucky House of Representatives 1849–51. U.S. Representative from Kentucky 1851–55. Delegate to the Democratic National Convention in 1856. Vice President of the United States 1857–61. Candidate for President of the United States 1860. United States Senator from Kentucky 1861. Major General in the Confederate States Army 1861–65. Confederate States Secretary of War 1865. Son of Joseph Cabell Breckinridge I.
- Mary Cabell Breckinridge (1826–1854) Married cousin Colonel Peter A. Porter in 1852. Daughter of Rev. John Breckinridge.
- Colonel Peter Augustus Porter (1827–1864), New York Assemblyman 1861–62, Colonel of the 129th New York State Volunteers, killed in action, 1864, Only son of Peter Buell Porter. Married cousin Mary Cabell Breckinridge in 1852.
- Mary Cabell Breckinridge, (born 1828) Daughter of Robert Jefferson Breckinridge. Married to William Warfield.
- Samuel Miller Breckinridge (1828–1891) Member of Missouri legislature 1854–1855. Became Circuit Court judge in 1859. Elder in the Presbyterian Church and a leading member of its General Assembly. Married Virginia Harrison Castleman. Son of Rev. John Breckinridge.
- Robert Jefferson Breckinridge Jr. (1834–1915), Confederate States Representative from Kentucky 1862–1865, Colonel in the Confederate States Army, Kentucky Common Pleas Court Judge 1876. Son of Robert Jefferson Breckinridge. Married Katharine Morrison in 1856.
- Marie Lettice Preston Breckinridge (born 1836), married Rev. William Collins Handy in 1857.
- William Campbell Preston Breckinridge (1837–1904), delegate to the Democratic National Convention 1876, U.S. Representative from Kentucky 1885–1895. Married Lucretia Hart Clay, granddaughter of Henry Clay. Son of Robert Jefferson Breckinridge.
- Joseph Cabell Breckinridge Sr. (1842–1921), General in the U.S. Army. Married Louise Ludlow Dudley, daughter of Ethelbert Ludlow Dudley, 1868. Son of Robert Jefferson Breckinridge.
- Charles Henry Breckinridge (1844–1867), Captain in the U.S. Army. Son of Robert Jefferson Breckinridge.
- Joseph Cabell Breckinridge, II (1844–1906) Major in the C.S.A. Married Sallie Frances Johnson, daughter of Robert Ward Johnson in 1869. Son of Hon. John Cabell Breckinridge.
- Clifton Rhodes Breckinridge (1846–1932), U.S. Representative from Arkansas 1883–1889 1890–1895, U.S. Minister to Russia 1894–1897, delegate to the Arkansas Constitutional Convention 1917. Married Katherine Breckinridge Carson in 1876. Son of Hon. John Cabell Breckinridge.
- John Witherspoon "Owen" Breckinridge (1850–1892) Member of California State Assembly 1884–85. Son of Hon. John Cabell Breckinridge. Married to Louise Tevis, daughter of Lloyd Tevis, First President of Wells Fargo Bank.
- Margaret Miller Breckinridge (1851–1919) Married St. Louis, Missouri businessman William Strudwick Long. Daughter of Samuel Miller Breckinridge.
- Benjamin Breckinridge Warfield (1851–1921), Presbyterian theologian, principal of Princeton Theological Seminary. Son of Mary Cabell Breckinridge and William Warfield.
- Peter Augustus Porter (1853–1925), member of the New York Legislature, U.S. Representative from New York 1907–1909. Married Alice Adelle Taylor (1853–1934). Son of Peter Augustus Porter and Mary Cabell Breckinridge, Grandson of Peter Buell Porter.
- Ethelbert Dudley Warfield (1861–1936) Graduate of Princeton, Oxford, and Columbia Law School. President of Miami University and Lafayette College, author, Director of Princeton Theological Seminary. Son of Mary Cabell Breckinridge and William Warfield.
- L. Irving Handy (1861–1922), U.S. Representative from Delaware 1897–1899, delegate to the Democratic National Convention 1904. Son of Marie Lettice Preston Breckinridge and Rev. William Collins Handy. Nephew of William Campbell Preston Breckinridge.
- Desha Breckinridge (1867–1935), editor and publisher of the Lexington Herald. Married Madeline McDowell Breckinridge, great-granddaughter of Henry Clay in 1898. Son of W.C.P. Breckinridge. Brother of Sophonisba Breckinridge.
- John Cabell Breckinridge, II (1870–1941) Prominent New York attorney. Married to Isabella Goodrich (1874–1961), daughter of B.F. Goodrich. Son of Joseph Cabell Breckinridge. Grandson of John Cabell Breckinridge.
- Joseph Cabell Breckinridge Jr. (1872–1898), U.S. Naval officer, drowned. Namesake of USS Breckinridge. Son of Joseph Cabell Breckinridge Sr.
- Ethelbert Ludlow Dudley Breckinridge (1875–1914) Graduated Princeton 1898, Captain in U.S. Army, wounded in the Philippine–American War. Son of Joseph Cabell Breckinridge Sr. Married Genevieve Pearson Mattingly (1878–1957).
- Peter Augustus Porter Jr. (b. 1877). Married Geneva Thompson in 1907.
- James Carson Breckinridge (1877–1942) Lieutenant General, USMC, Married Dorothy Throckmorton Thompson, 1922. Son of Clifton Rhodes Breckinridge.
- Lloyd Tevis Breckinridge (1878–1901) Son of John Witherspoon "Owen" Breckinridge.
- John Cabell Breckinridge Sr. (1879–1914) Prominent San Francisco businessman. Son of John Witherspoon "Owen" Breckinridge. Married Adelaide Murphy, daughter of Samuel Green Murphy, President of the First National Bank of San Francisco, California.
- Cabell Breckinridge Porter (b. 1881), illustrator. Married Grace S. Sizer.
- Samuel Miller Breckinridge Long (1881–1958) lawyer and diplomat. Graduated Princeton in 1904. Advisor to Presidents Woodrow Wilson and Franklin Delano Roosevelt. U.S. Ambassador to Italy 1933–36. U.S. delegate to Dumbarton Oaks Conference. Son of Margaret Miller Breckinridge and William Strudwick Long.
- Mary Breckinridge (1881–1965), Founder of the Frontier Nursing Service. Married Richard Thompson. Daughter of Clifton Rhodes Breckinridge, sister of James Carson Breckinridge.
- Scott Dudley Breckinridge Sr. (1882–1941) Physician in Lexington, Kentucky, author, U.S. Fencing Champion (Foil), 1906 and 1914. Competed in 1912 Olympic Games in Stockholm. Married Gertrude Ashby Bayne. Son of Joseph Cabell Breckinridge Sr.
- Sophonisba Preston Breckinridge (1886–1948), Lawyer, Activist involved in Women's rights, Civil Rights, Labor, and Pacifist movements; namesake of Breckinridge House, a dormitory of the University of Chicago. Daughter of W.C.P. Breckinridge. Sister of Desha Breckinridge.
- Henry Skillman Breckinridge (1886–1960), Colonel in U.S. Army, United States Assistant Secretary of War, prominent attorney, U.S. Fencing Champion (Épée), 1924. Son of Joseph Cabell Breckinridge Sr. Married Ruth Bradley Woodman in 1910, member of prominent New England Perkins Family.
- Preston Buell Porter (1891–1978). Married Margaret Ransom (b. 1894)
- John Cabell "Bunny" Breckinridge Jr. (1903–1996) Actor and drag queen. Son of John Cabell Breckinridge Sr.
- Mary Marvin Breckinridge (1905–2002), Photojournalist, cinematographer, and philanthropist. Daughter of John Cabell Breckinridge, II and Isabella Goodrich. Great-granddaughter of John Cabell Breckinridge and granddaughter of B.F. Goodrich.
- William Mattingly Breckinridge (1905–1996) Major General, U.S. Army. Chief of the U.S. Army Security Agency. Married Frances Naylor. Son of Ethelbert Ludlow Dudley Breckinridge.
- Elizabeth Foster Breckinridge (1911–2005), Prominent Washington, D.C. socialite and philanthropist. Daughter of Henry Skillman Breckinridge. Married to John Stephens Graham, attorney, Assistant U.S. Secretary of Treasury, Commissioner of U.S. Atomic Energy Commission, Commissioner of Internal Revenue, brother of Katherine G. Howard.
- John Bayne Breckinridge (1913–1979), Colonel in U.S. Army during World War II. Kentucky State Representative 1956–59, Attorney General of Kentucky 1960–64, 1968–1972, delegate to the Democratic National Convention 1960, U.S. Representative from Kentucky 1973–79. Son of Scott Dudley Breckinridge Sr.
- Scott Dudley Breckinridge Jr. (1917–2000) Deputy Inspector General of the C.I.A., author. Married Helen Virden Babbit. Son of Scott Dudley Breckinridge Sr.

=== Prominent non-family members ===
- Francis Preston (1765–1836), Virginia House Delegate 1788–1789 1812–1814, U.S. Representative from Virginia 1793–1797, Virginia State Senator 1816–1820. Cousin of John Brown, John Breckinridge, and James Breckinridge, Grandson of Robert Preston.
- William Campbell Preston (1794–1860), South Carolina State Representative 1828–1834, U.S. Senator from South Carolina 1833–1842. Son of Francis Preston.
- William Ballard Preston (1805–1862), Virginia House Delegate 1830–1832 1844–1845, Virginia State Senator 1840–1844, U.S. Representative from Virginia 1847–1849, U.S. Secretary of War 1849–1850, Delegate to the Confederate States Congress from Virginia 1861–1862, Confederate States Senator from Virginia 1862. Nephew of Francis Preston.
- William Preston (1816–1887), delegate to the Kentucky Constitutional Convention 1849, Kentucky State Representative 1850 1868–1869, Kentucky State Senator 1851–1853, U.S. Representative from Kentucky 1852–1855, delegate to the Democratic National Convention 1856, U.S. Minister to Spain 1859–1861. Nephew of Francis Preston.
- John Brown (1757–1837), Virginia State Senator 1784–1788, Delegate to the Continental Congress from Virginia 1787–1788, U.S. Representative from Virginia 1789–1792, U.S. Senator from Kentucky 1792–1805. Brother of James Brown, Cousin of John Breckinridge, James Breckinridge, and Francis Preston.
- B. Gratz Brown (1826–1885), Missouri State Representative 1852–1858, delegate to the Republican National Convention 1860, U.S. Senator from Missouri 1863–1867, Governor of Missouri 1871–1873, candidate for Vice President of the United States 1872. Grandson of John Brown.
- James Brown (1766–1835), U.S. District Attorney in Kentucky 1791, Kentucky Secretary of State 1792–1798, Secretary of the Territory of Orleans 1804, U.S. District Attorney in Louisiana 1805–1808, U.S. Senator from Louisiana 1813–1817 1819–1823, U.S. Minister to France 1823–1829. Brother of John Brown, Cousin of John Breckinridge, James Breckinridge, and Francis Preston.
- Thomas H. Clay (1803–1871), U.S. Minister to Nicaragua 1863, U.S. Minister to Honduras 1863. Father-in-law of William Campbell Preston Breckinridge.
- Henry Donnel Foster (1808–1880), U.S. Representative from Pennsylvania 1843–1847 1871–1873, Pennsylvania State Representative 1857, candidate for Governor of Pennsylvania 1860. Cousin of John C. Breckinridge.

NOTE: Peter B. Porter was also uncle of U.S. Senator Augustus S. Porter. Thomas H. Clay was also son of Speaker of the U.S. House of Representatives Henry Clay, brother of U.S. Representative James Brown Clay, third cousin of U.S. diplomat Brutus Clay, fourth cousin of U.S. Senator Clement Claiborne Clay Jr., first cousin twice removed of U.S. Representative Matthew Clay and Kentucky State Senator Green Clay, third cousin once removed of U.S. Senator Clement Comer Clay, and second cousin once removed of Alabama State Senator Matthew Clay, U.S. Representative Brutus J. Clay, and U.S. diplomat Cassius M. Clay.

== Family tree ==
- Alexander Breckenridge (1686–1743) ∞ Jane Preston (c. 1690–1746) (granddaughter of William Stewart, 1st Viscount Mountjoy)
  - Robert Preston Breckenridge Sr. (1720–1773) ∞ (1) Mary Poage (1732–c. 1757) ∞ (2) Letitia Preston (1729–1797)
    - Alexander Breckenridge (1752–1801) ∞ Jane Buchanan Floyd (1759–1812) (mother of John Floyd)
      - James Douglas Breckinridge (1781–1849) ∞ Mary Eliza Grayson (1795–1830)
    - Robert Breckenridge (1754–1833) ∞ Margaret Douglas (1740–1790)
      - James Breckenridge (1774–1853) ∞ Eva Hockersmith (c. 1783–1861)
    - John Breckinridge (1760–1806) ∞ 1785: Mary Hopkins Cabell
      - Letitia Breckinridge ∞ (1) 1804: Alfred William Grayson (d. 1810) (son of Senator William Grayson); ∞ (2) 1818: Peter Buell Porter (1773–1844)
        - General John Breckinridge Grayson (1806–1862)
        - Colonel Peter Augustus Porter (1827–1864) ∞ 1852: Mary Cabell Breckinridge (1826–1854)
          - Peter Augustus Porter (1853–1925) ∞ Alice Adelle Taylor (1853–1934)
            - Peter Augustus Porter Jr. (b. 1877) ∞ 1907: Geneva Thompson
            - Cabell Breckinridge Porter (b. 1881) ∞ Grace S. Sizer
            - Preston Buell Porter (1891–1978) ∞ Margaret Ransom (b. 1894)
      - Joseph "Cabell" Breckinridge I (1788–1823) ∞ Mary Clay Smith (daughter of Samuel Stanhope Smith)
        - John Cabell Breckinridge (1821–1875) ∞ Mary Cyrene Burch (1826–1907)
          - Joseph Cabell Breckinridge, II (1844–1906) ∞ 1869: Sallie Frances Johnson (daughter of Robert Ward Johnson)
            - John Cabell Breckinridge, II (1870–1941) ∞ Isabella Goodrich (1874–1961) (daughter of B.F. Goodrich)
              - Mary Marvin Breckinridge (1905–2002) ∞ 1940: Jefferson Patterson
          - Clifton Rhodes Breckinridge (1846–1932) ∞ 1876: Married Katherine Breckinridge Carson
            - James Carson Breckinridge (1877–1942) ∞ 1922: Dorothy Throckmorton Thompson
            - Mary Breckinridge (1881–1965) ∞ Richard Thompson
          - John Witherspoon "Owen" Breckinridge (1850–1892) ∞ Louise Tevis (daughter of Lloyd Tevis)
            - Lloyd Tevis Breckinridge (1878–1901)
            - John Cabell Breckinridge Sr. (1879–1914) ∞ Adelaide Murphy, (daughter of Samuel Green Murphy)
              - John Cabell "Bunny" Breckinridge Jr. (1903–1996) ∞ 1927: (div. 1929) Roselle du Val de Dampierre (1903–1999)
            - Florence Louise Breckinridge (1881–1956) ∞ Thomas Fermor-Hesketh, 1st Baron Hesketh
      - Rev. John Breckinridge, D. D. (1797–1841) ∞ 1823: Margaret Miller (daughter of Rev. Samuel Miller D. D.)
        - Mary Cabell Breckinridge (1826–1854) ∞ 1852: Colonel Peter Augustus Porter (1853–1925)
        - Margaret Elizabeth Breckinridge (1831–1864)
        - Samuel Miller Breckinridge (1828–1891) ∞ Virginia Harrison Castleman.
          - Margaret Miller Breckinridge (1851–1919) ∞ William Strudwick Long
            - Samuel Miller Breckinridge Long (1881–1958) ∞ 1912: Christine Alexander Graham
      - Robert Jefferson Breckinridge (1800–1871) ∞ 1823: Ann Sophonisba Preston (sister of William Campbell Preston)
        - Mary Cabell Breckinridge, (born 1828) ∞ William Warfield
          - Benjamin Breckinridge Warfield (1851–1921) ∞ 1876: Annie Pierce Kinkead
          - Ethelbert Dudley Warfield (1861–1936) ∞ (1) Sarah Lacy Brookes (1864–1886) ∞ (2) 1890: Nellie Frances Tilton (1864–1941)
        - Robert Jefferson Breckinridge Jr. (1834–1915) ∞ 1856: Katharine Morrison
        - Marie Lettice Preston Breckinridge (born 1836) ∞ 1857: Rev. William Collins Handy
          - Levin Irving Handy (1861–1922) ∞ 1887: Mary Bell
        - William Campbell Preston Breckinridge (1837–1904) ∞ Lucretia Hart Clay (granddaughter of Henry Clay)
          - Desha Breckinridge (1867–1935) ∞ Madeline McDowell (1872–1920) (daughter of Henry Clay McDowell)
          - Sophonisba Preston Breckinridge (1886–1948)
        - Joseph Cabell Breckinridge Sr. (1842–1921) ∞ 1868: Louise Ludlow Dudley (1849–1911) (daughter of Ethelbert Ludlow Dudley)
          - Joseph Cabell Breckinridge Jr. (1872–1898)
          - Ethelbert Ludlow Dudley Breckinridge (1875–1914) ∞ Genevieve Pearson Mattingly (1878–1957)
            - William Mattingly Breckinridge (1905–1996) ∞ Frances Naylor
          - Dr. Scott Dudley Breckinridge Sr. (1882–1941) ∞ Gertrude Ashby Bayne (1883–1981)
            - John Bayne Breckinridge (1913–1979) ∞ Helen Congleton (1916–2000)
            - Scott Dudley Breckinridge Jr. (1917–2000) ∞ Helen Virden Babbit
          - Henry Skillman Breckinridge (1886–1960) ∞ (1) 1910: (div. 1925) Ruth Bradley Woodman; ∞ (2) 1927: (div. 1947) Aida de Acosta (1881–1962); ∞ (3) 1947: Margaret Lucy
            - Elizabeth Foster Breckinridge (1911–2005) ∞ John Stephens Graham (1905–1976) (son of Margaret Nowell Graham)
        - Charles Henry Breckinridge (1844–1867)
        - John Robert Breckinridge (1850–1874)
      - Rev. William Lewis Breckinridge, D. D. (1803–1876)
    - James Breckinridge (1763–1833) ∞ Ann Cary Selden (1770–1843)
      - Letitia Breckinridge (1791–1866) ∞ Robert Gamble (1781–1867)
      - Elizabeth Breckinridge (1794–1862) ∞ Edward Watts (1779–1859)
      - Cary Breckinridge (1796–1867) ∞ Emma Walker Gilmer (1807–1893)
      - Matilda Breckinridge (1799–1869) ∞ Henry Winston Bowyer (1799–1876)

== See also ==
- List of United States political families
