= Robert Breckinridge =

Robert Breckinridge may refer to:

- Robert Jefferson Breckinridge (1800–1871), American politician and Presbyterian minister
- Robert Jefferson Breckinridge Jr. (1833–1915), Confederate Congressman and colonel in the Confederate Army

== See also ==
- Robert B. McAfee (Robert Breckinridge McAfee, 1784–1849), Kentucky diplomat, historian and politician
