= Desha Breckinridge =

American newspaper editor and publisher

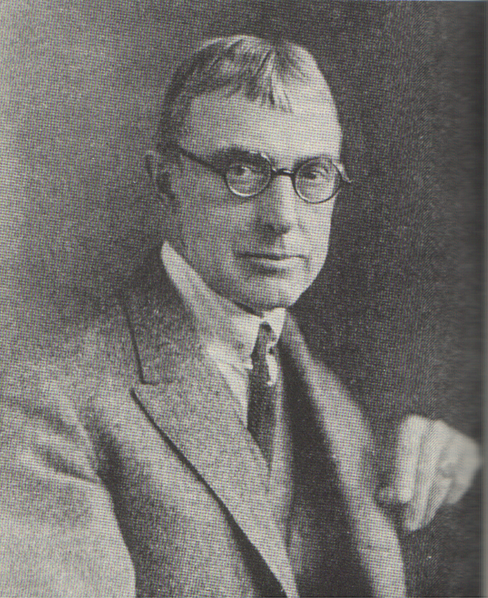
- Desha Breckinridge in 1920
- Born: August 5, 1867; Lexington, Kentucky, US
- Died: February 18, 1935 (aged 67); Lexington, Kentucky, US
- Education: Princeton University (B.A.)
- Known for: Progressive Era Journalism
- Spouse(s): Madeline McDowell Breckinridge (1872–1920) and Mary Frazer LeBus (1872–1949)

Desha Breckinridge (August 5, 1867 – February 18, 1935) was the editor and publisher of the Lexington Herald from 1897 to 1935. In 1898, he married Madeline McDowell, who became nationally known as Madeline McDowell Breckinridge. He was a brother of Sophonisba Breckinridge and the son of William Campbell Preston Breckinridge, a member of Congress from Kentucky and a lawyer. His grandfather was the abolitionist minister Robert Jefferson Breckinridge, and his great-grandfather was John Breckinridge.

== Early life ==
Desha Breckinridge was the son of Issa Desha and William Campbell Preston Breckinridge. His siblings who lived past infancy were Sophonisba Preston Breckinridge (1866–1948), Mary Curry Breckinridge (1875–1918), and half-sister Eleanor Breckinridge Chalkley (1862–1943). Tutored by James Lane Allen as a young man, Breckinridge attended State College (now University of Kentucky) in 1880–81, before he graduated from Lawrenceville School in New Jersey. He graduated from Princeton University in 1889, and studied for the bar at Columbia University and the University of Virginia. Along with his older sister Sophonisba Breckinridge, he passed the Kentucky bar exam and joined his father's law firm, Breckinridge & Stanley. He served as an aide-de-camp to his uncle, Major General Joseph Cabell Breckinridge Sr., during the Spanish–American War.

== Career ==
In January 1897, he took over a newly created newspaper, the Lexington Morning Herald. The next year, on November 17, 1898, he married Madeline "Madge" McDowell. They worked together on the newspaper and by the early 1900s, he would lobby legislators with his wife to win universal suffrage and support her work in using the newspaper to call for reform. Editorials and articles covered juvenile justice, education, tuberculosis commissions, crime and the penal system, environmental issues, gun control, and anti-lynching laws. He criticized the Ku Klux Klan and advocated for the creation of a state police force. The newspaper grew in circulation and quality with such great writers as Cora Wilson Stewart and well-respected Kentucky scholars such as Samuel Wilson and Charles Kerr.

Breckinridge co-founded the Fayette Home Telephone Company in 1899, and he invested in land deals both in the Bluegrass and eastern Kentucky.

Nearly a decade after Madeline's death, Desha married the widow Mary Frazer LeBus. They had been rumored to have been lovers for several years before Madeline's death. They lived together at her home, Hinata, on the edge of Lexington.

== Death ==
He died after a long illness on February 18, 1935, and is buried in the Lexington Cemetery.

== See also ==
- Breckinridge family
- History of Lexington Herald-Leader
- Madeline McDowell Breckinridge
- Sophonisba Breckinridge
- William Campbell Preston Breckinridge

== Sources and external links ==
- Breckinridge Family Papers at the Library of Congress
- Hay, Melba Porter (2009). Madeline McDowell Breckinridge and the Battle for a New South. Lexington: University Press of Kentucky.
- Klotter, James C. (1986). The Breckinridges of Kentucky, 1760-1981. Lexington: University Press of Kentucky.
