= Scott Breckinridge =

American fencer

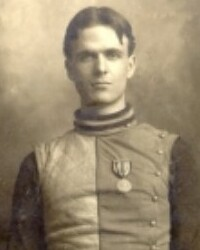
- Scott Breckinridge in 1904

Personal information
- Full name: Scott Dudley Breckinridge
- Born: May 23, 1882 San Francisco, California, U.S.
- Died: August 1, 1941 (aged 59) Lexington, Kentucky, U.S.
- Spouse: Gertrude Ashby Bayne (m. 1911)

Sport
- Country: United States
- Sport: Fencing
- College team: United States Military Academy

Achievements and titles
- Olympic finals: 1912 Summer Olympics

Scott Dudley Breckinridge (May 23, 1882 – August 1, 1941) was an American fencer and gynecologist. He competed in the individual foil and team épée events at the 1912 Summer Olympics.

== Early life ==
Breckinridge was born in San Francisco, California on May 23, 1882. He was the son of Louise Ludlow (née Dudley) and Joseph Cabell Breckinridge Sr. Among his many siblings was older brother was Joseph Cabell Breckinridge Jr., an officer in the United States Navy in the Spanish–American War who died while serving on the torpedo boat USS Cushing. His younger brother, Henry Skillman Breckinridge, served as the United States Assistant Secretary of War under President Woodrow Wilson.

Unlike his father's cousin, John Cabell Breckinridge, a Confederate major general and former Vice President of the United States, his father Joseph was a Union Army officer from Kentucky during the American Civil War who served as Inspector General of the Army and was a major general of volunteers in the Spanish–American War.

His paternal grandfather was Robert Jefferson Breckinridge, a Presbyterian minister, politician, public office holder and abolitionist. His maternal grandfather was Ethelbert Ludlow Dudley, a prominent physician in Lexington, Kentucky.

== Career ==
Breckinridge attended the United States Military Academy at West Point where he excelled at fencing. He became a member of the United States fencing team at the 1912 Summer Olympics held in Stockholm, Sweden, competing in the épée and foil. He later coached the fencing team at the University of Kentucky.

Breckinridge left West Point without graduating in 1904 to attend the Georgetown University School of Medicine where he graduated with a degree in medicine in 1907 and then interned at Providence Hospital in Washington, D.C., and Columbia University Hospital in New York City. During World War I, he served in the Army Medical Corps and was promoted to Colonel.

== Personal life ==
In 1911, Breckinridge was married to Gertrude Ashby Bayne (1883–1981). Together, they were the parents of two sons and a daughter, including:

- John Bayne Breckinridge (1913–1979), who became a U.S. Representative from Kentucky.
- Scott Dudley Breckinridge Jr. (1917–2000), who became the Deputy Inspector General of the Central Intelligence Agency.
- Gertrude Bayne "Trudy" Breckinridge (1922–2014), who married Compton Sargent in 1944. She later married Francis Bradley Peyton III in 1948.

Breckinridge died at his home in Lexington, Kentucky on August 1, 1941.
