= John Breckinridge =

John Breckinridge or Breckenridge may refer to:

- John Breckinridge (U.S. Attorney General) (1760–1806), U.S. Senator and U.S. Attorney General
- John C. Breckinridge (1821–1875), U.S. Representative and Senator, 14th Vice President of the United States, and Confederate general in the American Civil War
- John B. Breckinridge (1913–1979), Attorney General of Kentucky and U.S. Representative
- John Cabell Breckinridge (1903–1996), best known as Bunny Breckinridge, American actor
- John Robert Breckinridge, member of the prominent Breckinridge family

== See also ==
- John Brackenridge (disambiguation)
