= Joseph Breckinridge =

Joseph Breckinridge may refer to:

- Joseph Cabell Breckinridge (1788–1823), Speaker of the Kentucky House of Representatives 1817–1819 and Kentucky Secretary of State 1820–1823
- Joseph Cabell Breckinridge Sr. (1842–1920), soldier in the American Civil War and the Spanish–American War
- Joseph Cabell Breckinridge Jr. (1872–1898), soldier killed in the Spanish–American War

== See also ==
- Breckinridge family
