= Breckinridge family in the American Civil War =

American political/military family

The Breckinridge family exerted a powerful influence in the divided slave state of Kentucky, with Breckinridge County dating back well before its current constitution of 1799. They were viewed as southern aristocracy, counting many Confederate generals among their cousins. But family members also fought in the Union army, and supported Lincoln throughout the conflict.

== Family members ==
=== Robert Jefferson Breckinridge (1800–1871) ===
Kentucky politician, Presbyterian minister and editor, who believed that the preservation of the Union transcended the slavery debate. In the 1860 election, he supported Abraham Lincoln against his own nephew, John C. Breckinridge, and continued to back his policies, making a famous speech that contributed to the President's re-nomination for the 1864 election. Two of his sons fought on the Union side and two others for the Confederates.

=== John Cabell Breckinridge (1821–1875) ===
Breckingridge was the 14th vice president of the United States and a presidential candidate in the 1860 elections. Appointed brigadier general in the Confederate Army in November 1861, Breckinridge helped organise a provisional Confederate government for Kentucky. Wounded at Shiloh, he was promoted major general. Braxton Bragg assumed that his prestige would attract many Kentuckian recruits, and quarrelled sharply with him when this failed to happen, as he also did after a creditable performance at Stones River.

Ordered to the Eastern sector, he achieved his greatest victory at the Battle of New Market in the Shenandoah valley (May 1864), crucially protecting Robert E. Lee’s flank, and acquiring a reputation as the next Stonewall Jackson. This was confirmed when he halted Grant's advance at the Battle of Cold Harbor, where he was badly wounded. In February 1865, he was made Confederate Secretary of War, and promptly created a new post of General-in-Chief, which went to Lee. In the final days of the war, he destroyed much of the evacuated Confederate capital, Richmond, and then facilitated the escape of the cabinet. He evaded capture, travelled abroad with his family, and returned to America after the 1868 amnesty.

=== Robert Jefferson Breckinridge Jr. (1833–1915) ===
Kentucky politician, judge, Confederate congressman and colonel in the Confederate States Army. Represented Kentucky in the First Confederate Congress from 1862 to 1864. He was the son of Robert Jefferson Breckinridge.

=== William Campbell Preston Breckinridge (1837–1904) ===
Son of Robert Jefferson Breckinridge. Commissioned as a captain in the Confederate States Army in 1861, despite his father's strong Unionist beliefs. Served in the cavalry under John Hunt Morgan, ending the war as Colonel of the 9th Kentucky Cavalry. He also served as a bodyguard to Jefferson Davis during his flight from Richmond.

=== Sophonisba Preston Breckinridge (b. 1839) ===
Daughter of Robert Jefferson Breckinridge, and married to Theophilus Steele, who joined the Confederate cavalry and rode with John Hunt Morgan in his diversionary raid of Indiana, Kentucky, Ohio and West Virginia. Robert Breckinridge's intervention may have kept Steele from being executed by Edwin Stanton. (Not to be confused with her cousin, also Sophonisba Breckinridge.)

=== Joseph Cabell Breckinridge Sr. (1842–1920) ===
One of the sons of Robert Jefferson Breckinridge who shared his father's politics, and fought on the Union side, unlike two others. Appointed aide-de-camp to George H. Thomas, he served with him at Mill Springs and Shiloh, soon receiving a regular commission as a lieutenant of artillery. Captured in the Battle of Atlanta, he was exchanged and received a brevet promotion to major before the war's end.

=== Charles Henry Breckinridge (1844–1867) ===
Another son of Robert Jefferson Breckinridge who shared his father's politics. He transferred from Princeton University to West Point after war broke out in 1861 and was later commissioned in the Union Regular Army, rising to the rank of Captain and serving in the 15th US Infantry.

=== Clifton Rodes Breckinridge (1846–1932) ===
Son of John C. Breckinridge, with whom he joined the Confederate Army in 1861. Later he was appointed a midshipman in the Confederate Navy.

== Associate family members ==
• General John Breckinridge Grayson (1806–1861)

Regular officer, who resigned to join the Confederates. Died commanding the Georgia and Florida coastal defences. Son of Letitia Preston Breckinridge.

• Peter Augustus Porter (1827–1864)

New York Assemblyman, Colonel of the 129th New York State Volunteers, killed at Cold Harbour. Husband and cousin of Mary Cabell Breckinridge.

== See also ==
- Kentucky in the American Civil War
- Border states (American Civil War)
