= Robert J. Breckinridge =

Robert J. Breckinridge may refer to:

- Robert Jefferson Breckinridge (1800–1871), American politician and Presbyterian minister
- Robert Jefferson Breckinridge Jr. (1833–1915), Confederate congressman and colonel in the Confederate Army
