= Henry McDowell =

Henry McDowell may refer to:

- Henry C. McDowell Jr. (1861–1933), Virginia lawyer and federal judge
- Henry Clay McDowell (1832–1899), American businessman and horse breeder
