= Henry Clay Jr. =

American politician (1811–1847)

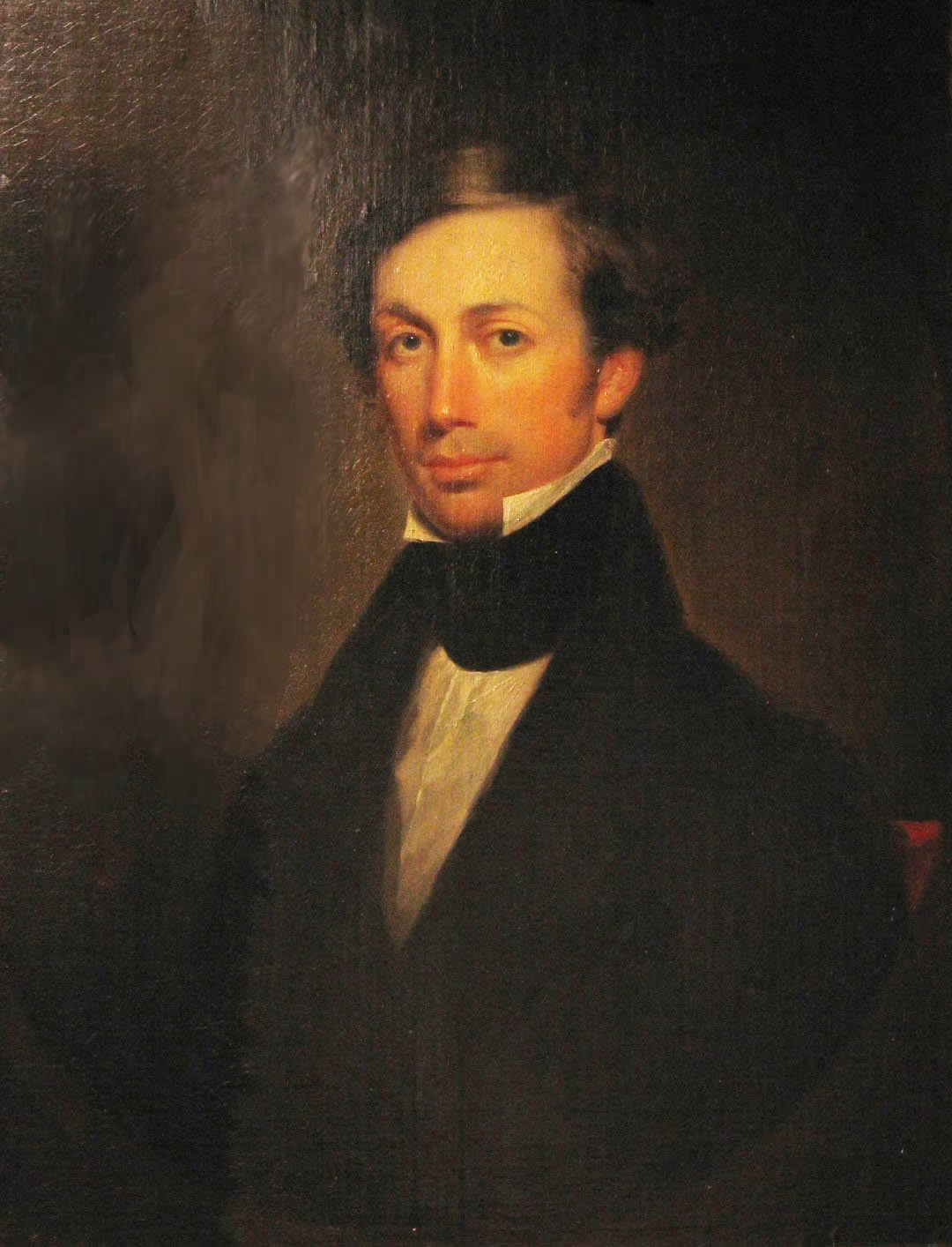

Member of the Kentucky House of Representatives
- In office 1835–1837

Personal details
- Born: April 10, 1811 Lexington, Kentucky; United States
- Died: February 23, 1847 (aged 35) Buena Vista, Coahuila, Mexico
- Resting place: Lexington Cemetery in Lexington Kentucky
- Spouse: Julia Prather (1814-1840) (m. 1832–1840)
- Children: Henry Clay III (b. 1833); Matilda (b. 1835); Anne Brown (b. 1837); Martha Clay (b. 1838); Thomas Julian Clay (b. 1840)
- Parent(s): Henry Clay & Lucretia Hart
- Relatives: Madeline McDowell Breckinridge (granddaughter)
- Education: Transylvania University; United States Military Academy
- Occupation: Lawyer, politician, soldier

Military service
- Allegiance: United States
- Branch/service: United States Army
- Years of service: 1831; 1846–1847
- Rank: Lieutenant Colonel
- Battles/wars: Mexican-American War: Battle of Buena Vista †

Henry Clay Jr. (April 10, 1811 – February 23, 1847) was an American politician and soldier from Kentucky, the third son of US Senator and Representative Henry Clay and Lucretia Hart Clay. He was elected to the Kentucky House of Representatives in 1835 and served one term. A graduate of West Point, he served in the Mexican–American War and was killed in 1847 at the Battle of Buena Vista. His father had opposed the war that took his son's life.

== Early life and education ==
Born on his family's estate of Ashland, in Lexington, Henry Jr. was the older brother of James Brown Clay and John Morrison Clay, the only sons surviving at the time of their father's death. He had six sisters, all of whom died before their father.

After graduating from Transylvania University in 1828, Clay gained an appointment to the U.S. Military Academy at West Point. He graduated in 1831 (2nd of his class), and served as a second lieutenant in the artillery for a few months before resigning. Returning to Kentucky, he read law and was admitted to the bar in 1833.

== Marriage and family ==
In 1832, Henry Clay Jr. married Julia Prather (1814–1840), with whom he had five children.

Their daughter Anne Brown Clay (1837–1917) married Major Henry Clay McDowell (1832–1899). In 1883, they purchased her grandfather's Ashland estate from other heirs. Their son, Thomas Clay McDowell, was a major figure in Thoroughbred horse racing in Kentucky. He was a breeder, owner, and horse trainer, who won the 1902 Kentucky Derby with Alan-a-Dale.

== Career ==
After starting his law career, in 1835 Clay was elected as a member of the Kentucky State House of Representatives, serving a two-year term to 1837.

=== Mexican–American War ===
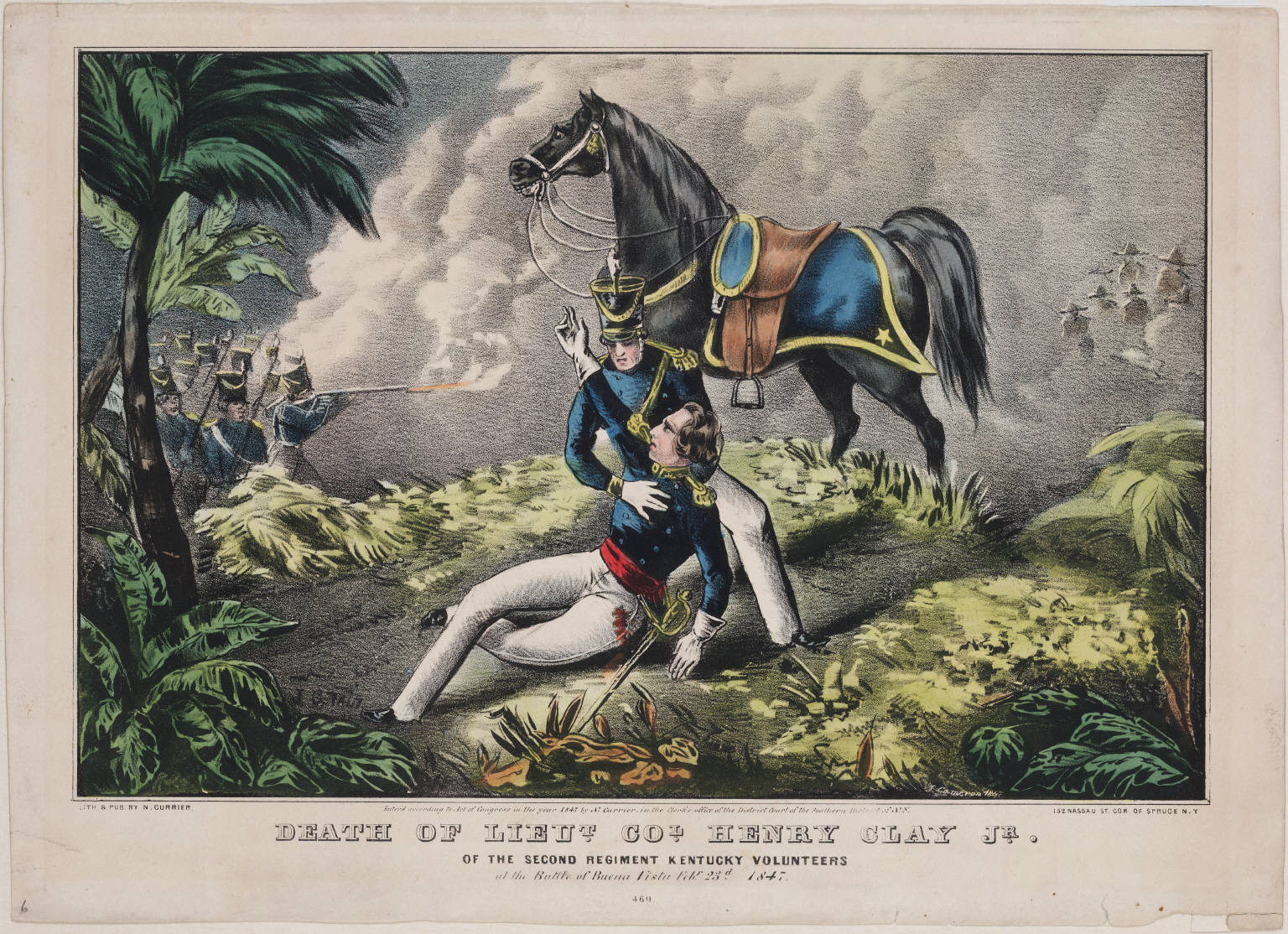
Death of Lt. Col. Henry Clay Jr. in 1847

When the Mexican–American War threatened, Clay was appointed to a regiment, the 2nd Kentucky Volunteers. He was commissioned a lieutenant colonel and led his regiment in support of Zachary Taylor's invasion force in 1846.

Clay brought one of his slaves named John with him to the war. On January 1, 1847, he wrote a letter back to his Kentucky family: "John asks me to give his Xmas compliments to you. He is still with me and has turned out on the whole a very good boy. He thanks God that he is still safe as several of his black companions have been killed by the Mexicans."

Clay was killed in action while leading a charge of his regiment in the Battle of Buena Vista on February 23, 1847. His body was transported to Kentucky, accompanied by Kentucky-born Colonel Jefferson Davis, where his funeral was a major event in Louisville—"practically the whole town turned out to see the parade"—and he was interred in Frankfort Cemetery in Frankfort.

His slave John also returned to Kentucky, where after emancipation, he took the full name John Henry Clay. In 1876, he and his wife Sallie had a son, Herman Heaton Clay. In 1912, Herman and his wife Edith had a son of their own and named him Cassius Marcellus Clay, after the abolitionist cousin of Henry Clay. In 1942, Cassius and his wife Odessa Grady Clay had a son they named Cassius Marcellus Clay Jr., who would later change his name to Muhammad Ali and become three-time heavyweight champion of the world and one of the most famous humans of the 20th century.

=== Legacy and honors ===
Clay County, Iowa is named in his honor.
