= John Brackenridge =

John Brackenridge may refer to:

- John Brackenridge (clergyman) (c.1772–1844), Presbyterian chaplain of the United States Congress
- John Brackenridge (baseball) (1880–1953), American baseball pitcher

== See also ==
- John Breckinridge (disambiguation)
