= Robert Jefferson Breckinridge Jr. =

American politician (1833–1915)

- Born: September 14, 1833; Baltimore, Maryland, U.S.
- Died: March 13, 1915 (aged 81); Danville, Kentucky, U.S.
- Occupation: Politician
- Spouse: Katharine Morrison (m. 1856)
- Parent(s): Robert Jefferson Breckinridge; Ann Sophonisba Preston
- Relatives: William Campbell Preston Breckinridge (brother)

Robert Jefferson Breckinridge Jr. (September 14, 1833 – March 13, 1915) was a Kentucky politician and a member of the Breckenridge political family.

== Life ==
He was the son of Robert Jefferson Breckinridge and brother of William Campbell Preston Breckinridge. He was born in Baltimore, Maryland. He served as a colonel in the Confederate Army in the Civil War. He later represented Kentucky in the First Confederate Congress from 1862 to 1864. After the war he served as a judge. He married Katharine Morrison in 1856.

== See also ==
• Breckinridge family in the American Civil War

• Kentucky in the American Civil War
