= Charles Henry Breckinridge =

American military officer (1844–1867)

- Born: September 9, 1844; Baltimore, Maryland, US
- Died: August 27, 1867 (aged 22); Fort Morgan, Alabama, US
- Parent: Robert Jefferson Breckinridge (father)

Charles Henry Breckinridge (September 9, 1844 – August 27, 1867) was a U.S. Army officer from Kentucky during the American Civil War.

== Early life ==
Breckinridge was born in 1844, a member of the prominent Breckinridge family, in Baltimore, Maryland. His parents were Ann Sophonisba Preston Breckinridge (1803–1844) and Robert Jefferson Breckinridge (1800–1871), a Presbyterian minister, politician, public office holder and abolitionist who was one of the most distinguished divines and one of the most prolific writers of the century. His father served as a leader of the Kentucky emancipation party in 1849 and was a strong Union man in 1861 at the outbreak of the Civil War.

== Career ==
His cousin, John C. Breckinridge, a Confederate major general and former Vice President of the United States, and his two oldest brothers fought for the Confederacy, while he and his other older brother Joseph Cabell Breckinridge Sr. fought for the Union. He transferred from Princeton University to West Point after war broke out in 1861 and was later commissioned in the Union Regular Army, rising to the rank of Captain and serving in the 15th US Infantry.
