= Madeline McDowell Breckinridge =

American leader of the women's suffrage movement in Kentucky

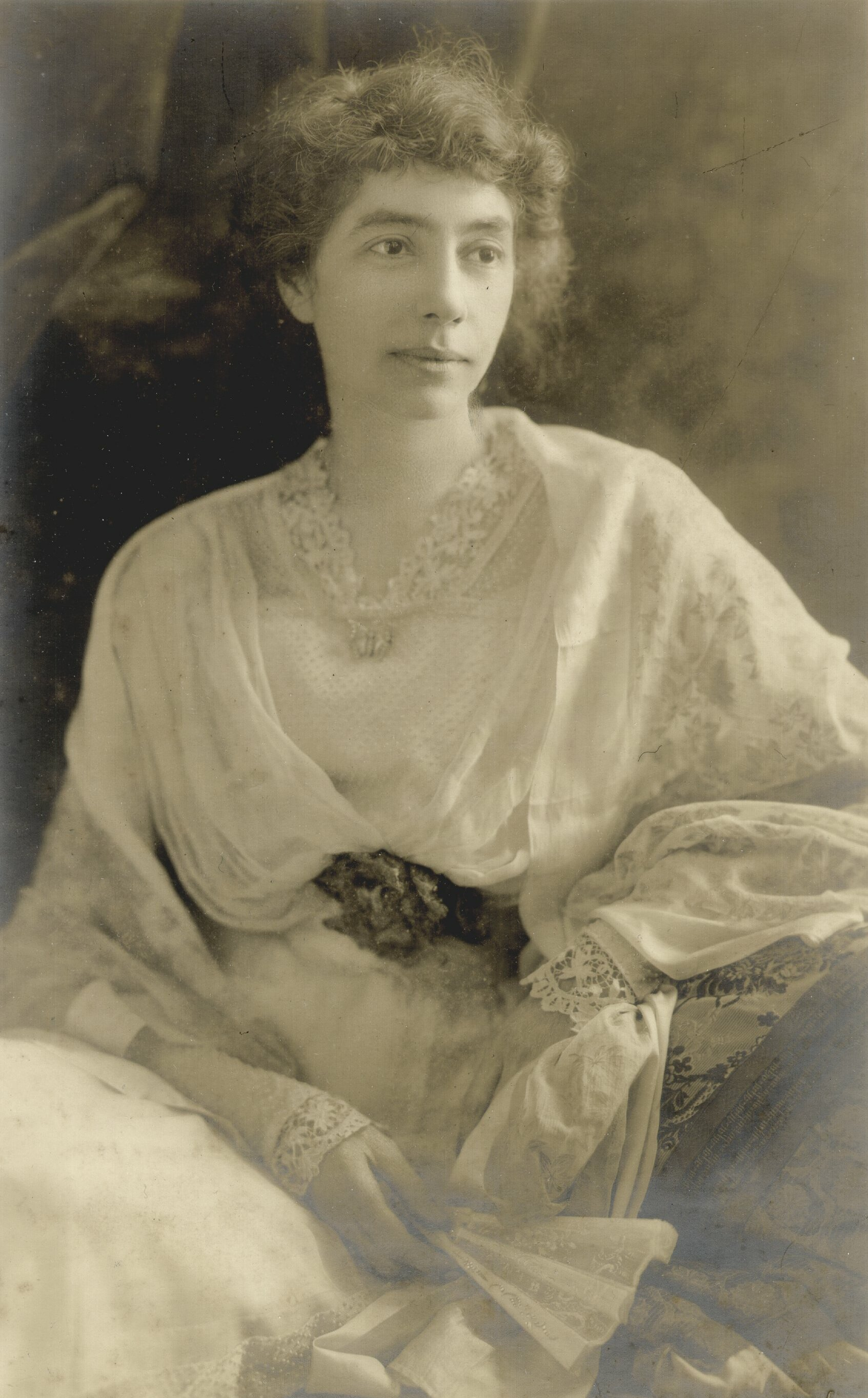
- Madeline McDowell Breckinridge, circa 1900
- Born: Madeline McDowell; May 20, 1872; Woodlake, Kentucky, U.S.
- Died: November 25, 1920 (aged 48); Lexington, Kentucky, U.S.
- Occupations: Suffragette, social reformer
- Relatives: Henry Clay (great-grandfather); Henry Clay Jr. (grandfather)

Madeline (Madge) McDowell Breckinridge (May 20, 1872 – November 25, 1920) was an American leader of the women's suffrage movement in Kentucky. She married Desha Breckinridge, editor of the Lexington Herald, which advocated women's rights, and she lived to see the women of Kentucky vote for the first time in the presidential election of 1920. She also initiated progressive reforms for compulsory school attendance and child labor. She founded many civic organizations, notably the Kentucky Association for the Prevention and Treatment of Tuberculosis, an affliction from which she had personally suffered. She led efforts to implement model schools for children and adults, parks and recreation facilities, and manual training programs.

In their book, A New History of Kentucky, Lowell H. Harrison and James C. Klotter, state that Breckinridge was the most influential woman in the state. She was named one of the Kentucky Women Remembered in 1996 and her portrait is permanently displayed at the state capitol.

== Biography ==
=== Early life and family ===
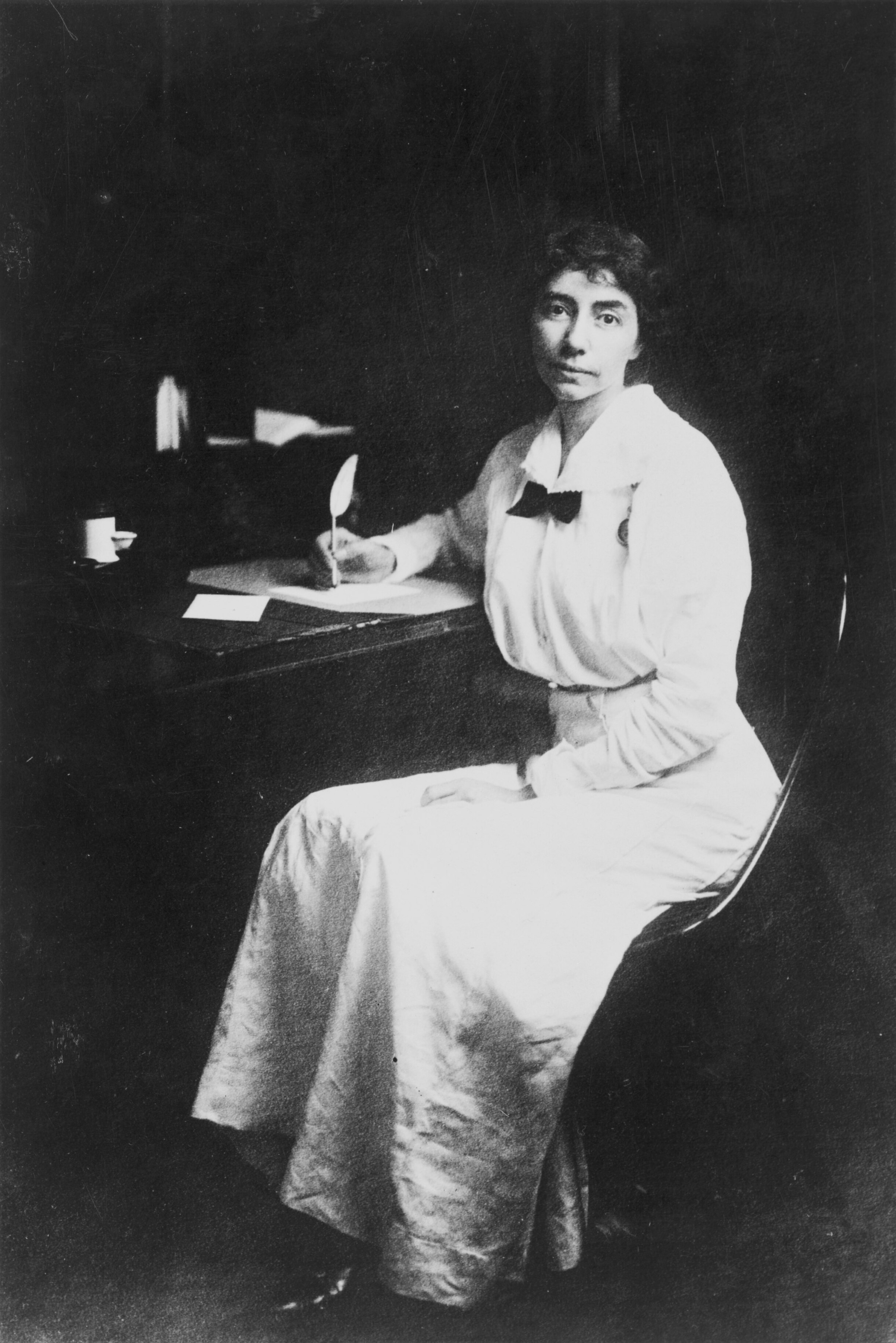
Breckinridge at her desk

She was born in Woodlake, Kentucky and grew up at Ashland, the farm established by her great-grandfather, nineteenth-century statesman Henry Clay. Her mother was Henry Clay, Jr.'s daughter, Anne Clay McDowell, and her father was Major Henry Clay McDowell (a namesake of Henry Clay), who served during the American Civil War on the Union side. They purchased the Ashland estate in 1882.

She was one of seven children. There were four boys, Henry Clay, William Adair, Thomas Clay and Ballard. Her two sisters were Nanette and Julia. Henry was a federal judge and Thomas was a renowned thoroughbred racehorse owner, breeder and trainer who won the 1902 Kentucky Derby.

Breckinridge was grandniece of Dr. Ephraim McDowell. Her distant cousin, Laura Clay, founded the Kentucky Equal Rights Association in 1888, of which Breckinridge later became president.

=== Education ===
She was educated in Lexington, Kentucky, at Miss Porter's School in Farmington, Connecticut, and at State College (now the University of Kentucky) between 1890 and 1894. She suffered from illness during her college years and, due to tuberculosis of the bone, part of one leg was amputated and she received a wooden leg. The once athletic young woman became more studious. She wrote book reviews for the Lexington Herald and studied German philosophy and literature with other Fortnightly Club members.

=== Marriage ===
On November 17, 1898, Madeline McDowell married Desha Breckinridge, the editor of the Lexington Herald. He was the brother of the lawyer and pioneering social worker Sophonisba Breckinridge, who wrote a biography of her sister-in-law entitled Madeline McDowell Breckinridge: A Leader in the New South.

The Breckinridges together used the newspaper's editorial pages to promote political and social causes of the Progressive Era, especially programs for the poor, child welfare and for women's rights. Desha was not a faithful man during their marriage, and as a result Breckinridge escaped her embarrassment by being busy with her civic activities. She was a patient in a Denver, Colorado sanitarium in 1903 and 1904. About 1904, when she was 32 years of age, she suffered a stroke.

=== Civic activities ===
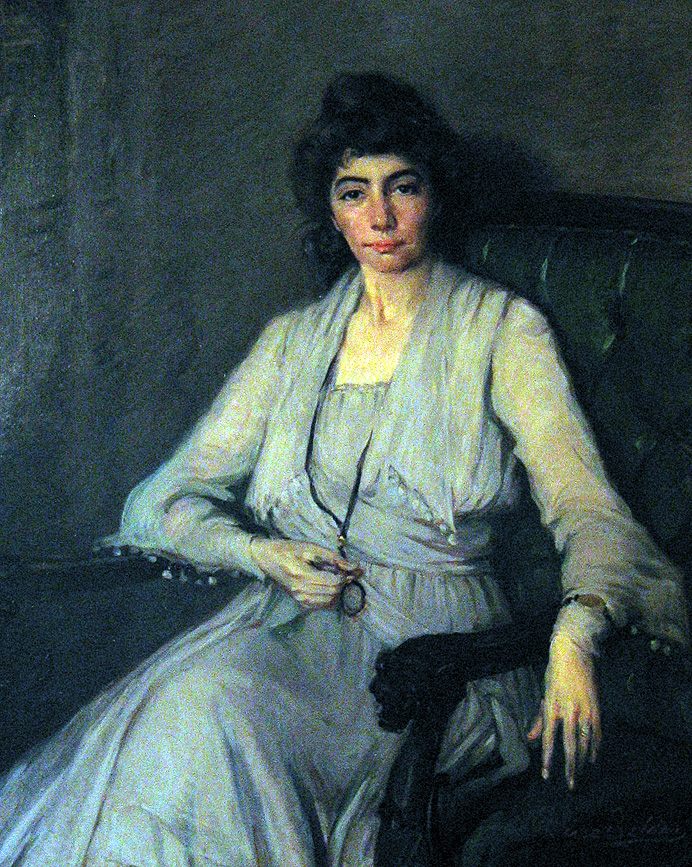
Dixie Selden, Madeline McDowell Breckinridge, 1920, Ashland, The Henry Clay Estate, Lexington, Kentucky

She organized a social settlement at Proctor, Kentucky's Episcopal mission with the Gleaners of Christ Church Episcopal from 1899 to 1900. In 1900, she helped found the Lexington Civic League, which created public kindergartens, parks, and recreational opportunities for children, and she also helped found the relief organization, Associated Charities, that year. Breckenridge also worked to have laws enacted regarding child labor, compulsory school attendance, a development of a juvenile justice system in the state (law passed in 1906). She also worked to introduce manual training of domestic science and carpentry in schools, which was funded by the board of education beginning in 1907. Through the efforts of the Lexington Civic League, she founded a social settlement, similar to Chicago's Hull House, named the Lincoln School for Robert Todd Lincoln who donated $30,000 towards the building cost. The school, which opened in 1912, had classrooms for children's day and adult's night classes, swimming pools, gymnasium, a laundry, carpenter shop, cannery, and a community assembly hall. It served poor Lexington residents, including an influx of Irish immigrants, many of whom were illiterate.

Breckinridge began working on finding ways to provide services for individuals with tuberculosis in Lexington in 1905, first with the development of a free clinic. She led the efforts within the Associated Charities and Civic League. She founded the Kentucky Association for the Prevention and Treatment of Tuberculosis in 1912, helped establish the Blue Grass Sanitarium in Lexington, by also working with the Fayette County Tuberculosis Association, and served on the state commission until 1916.

Breckinridge chaired the legislative committee of the Kentucky Federation of Women's Clubs in 1908, 1910, and 1912. She worked hard, among other things, in this role to restore the rights of Kentucky women to vote in school board elections even before the 19th Amendment granted full suffrage.

=== Equal rights ===
Frustrated by the lack of influence that she and other women had with state politicians regarding social reform, Breckenridge began lobbying the right for women to vote so they would have a greater voice in the political process. From 1912 to 1915 and 1919 to 1920, Breckinridge served as president of the Kentucky Equal Rights Association.

By the mid-1910s, membership of this group had expanded to 119 of the 120 counties in Kentucky. In 1914, Breckinridge along with her cousin Laura Clay spoke to the Kentucky Legislation to introduce a suffrage movement. Breckinridge stated that in the cities women were taking an equal role with men in fighting "political corruption, vice, and faith."

She continued by saying that women had helped in framing laws to make the state better and were placed on commissions because officials knew the women were interested and would do a good job. She finished her speech by appealing to the legislator's sense of justice and asked them to show courage by voting to submit the proposed amendment to the voters.

Although this attempt failed, they were the first women to address a joint session of the Kentucky Legislature. The Herald reported that the two women were not invited to speak because the majority want to hear their speech on suffrage, but because legislators felt they had a duty to inform themselves on the issue.

Women had gained the right to vote in school elections in 1912, based on her lobbying efforts as legislative chair of the Kentucky Federation of Women's Clubs. Breckinridge had argued that Kentucky had an illiteracy rate of over 12%. She went on to argue that the rate was much lower in all other states where women were able to vote in school elections. She also said that men had not taken enough interest in school elections and were not going to the polls and voting. This led to about two-thirds of the district trustees being appointed by county superintendents rather than being elected.

Breckenridge was, between 1913 and 1915, vice president of the National American Woman Suffrage Association. She spoke about women's suffrage in several states. Breckenridge was also a member of the Fayette Equal Rights Association, which was a chapter of the Kentucky Equal Rights Association. Its goal was to gain state and federal legislation for women's right to vote. A "leading political figure", she was involved with the Woman's Democratic Club of Kentucky.

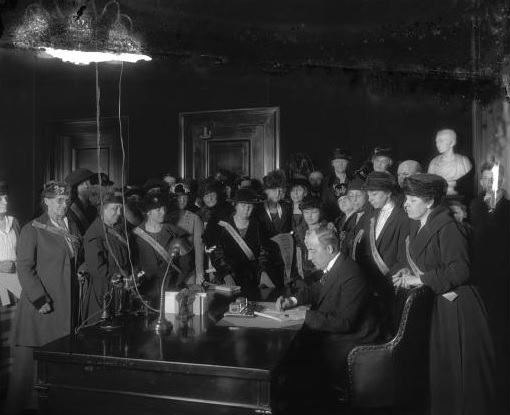
Madeline McDowell Breckinridge stands behind (second from the right) Governor Edwin P. Morrow as he signs Kentucky's ratification of the Nineteenth Amendment.

The most influential woman in the state, she used new tactics, such as suffrage marches, as well as her speaking ability and humor, to gain more support. In a strong voice coming from a slim and often weak body, she told audiences to look at male-led Kentucky, with its poor schools, violence, and corrupt politics, and asked if the question should not be whether women were fit for suffrage but whether men were.

— Lowell H. Harrison and James C. Klotter, A New History of Kentucky

As an example of her humor noted above, she is probably best known for a retort to then Governor James B. McCreary, “Kentucky women are not idiots---even though they are closely related to Kentucky men.” In Kentucky she challenged old-school politicians such as Congressman Ollie James state Senator J. Campbell Cantrill.

The Nineteenth Amendment to the United States Constitution ratified in Kentucky on January 6, 1920. Breckinridge campaigned across the country for the Democratic party and she voted in the November 1920 United States presidential election. She turned her efforts, then, on forming the state League of Women Voters from the Kentucky Equal Rights Association. Breckinridge was also a vocal supporter for the League of Nations.

=== Death and legacy ===
Breckinridge had been suffering from health problems, including tuberculosis. She had a stroke and died on Thanksgiving Day, 1920 at the age of 48. She was busy on that day preparing donations for the poor. Her papers are held at the University of Kentucky Libraries.

Breckinridge, named one of the Kentucky Women Remembered in 1996, was "regarded by some as militant, was one of Kentucky's most active suffragists and a fervent supporter of the Nineteenth Amendment." She married Lexington Herald editor Desha Breckinridge and together they advocated women's rights in the newspaper with arguments that delineate Kentucky's progressive ideals in this time period. Her portrait is a permanently hung in the capitol's "Kentucky Women Remembered" display.

After her death, Historical Marker #1876 was placed on the grounds of Ashland which is the estate of Henry Clay in Lexington Kentucky. The marker recognizes the contributions that Breckinridge made for women's suffrage. The marker reads: "This descendant of Henry Clay and Ephraim McDowell was born 1872 in Franklin Co; grow up at "Ashland," Clay's home; and married Desha breckinrdge, editor of Lexington Herald. Ill with tuberculosis, she promoted its treatment and cure; and advanced educational opportunities for poor children in Lexinton and entire state; and helped gain voting rights for women. over." The marker was dedicated on October 20, 1992.

== Publications ==
- "Women and the schools". The Democrat. Harrodsburg, Kentucky: Kentucky Federation of Women's Clubs. 1908.
- "The relation of the public schools to Kentucky's commercial development". The Democrat. Harrodsburg, Kentucky: Kentucky Federation of Women's Clubs. 1908.
- A Mother's Sphere. New York: National Woman Suffrage Publishing Co. 1917. OCLC 866988563. - accessible online via the Kentucky Woman Suffrage Project on the H-Kentucky network.

== See also ==
- List of suffragists and suffragettes
- Timeline of women's suffrage
