= William Campbell Preston Breckinridge =

American politician (1837–1904)

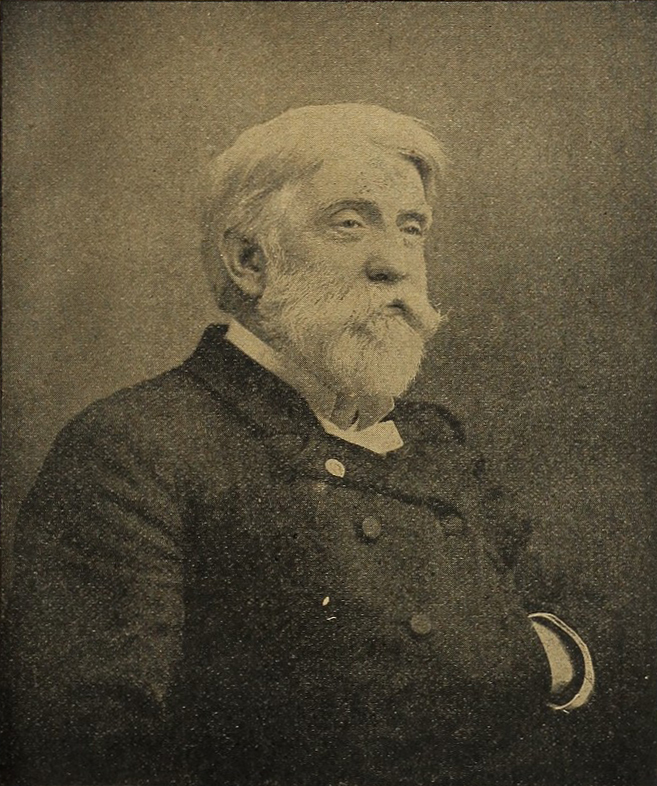

Member of the U.S. House of Representatives from Kentucky's 7th district
- In office March 4, 1885 – March 3, 1895
- Preceded by: Joseph Clay Stiles Blackburn
- Succeeded by: William Claiborne Owens

Personal details
- Born: August 28, 1837 Baltimore, Maryland, U.S.
- Died: November 18, 1904 (aged 67)
- Resting place: Lexington Cemetery
- Party: Democratic
- Relations: John C. Breckinridge (cousin)
- Children: Sophonisba; Desha
- Parent: Robert Jefferson Breckinridge (father)
- Education: Centre College; University of Louisville
- Profession: Lawyer

Military service
- Allegiance: Confederate States of America
- Branch/service: Confederate States Army
- Rank: Colonel
- Battles/wars: American Civil War

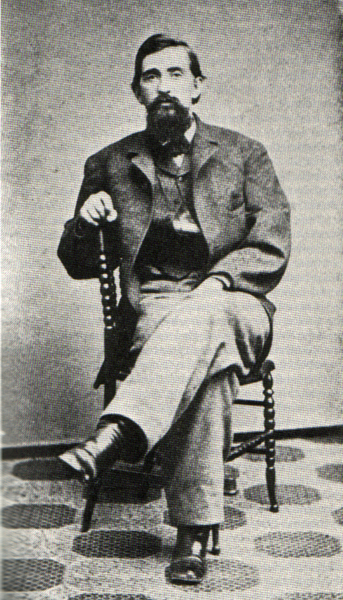
William Campbell Preston Breckinridge

William Campbell Preston Breckinridge (August 28, 1837 – November 18, 1904) was a lawyer and Democratic politician from Kentucky; a U.S. representative from 1885 to 1895. He was a scion of the Breckinridge political family: grandson of Senator John Breckinridge, and first cousin of Vice President John C. Breckinridge.

== Biography ==
=== Early life and education ===
William Breckinridge was born in Baltimore, Maryland, the son of Robert Jefferson Breckinridge, a prominent Kentucky minister, educator, and Unionist politician. His mother was the former Ann Sophonisba Preston. He was raised in Pennsylvania, where his father was president of Jefferson College.

Breckinridge graduated from Centre College in Danville, Kentucky, in 1855. He then studied as a medical doctor for a year but switched to law. He earned his Juris Doctor from the University of Louisville in 1857. He returned to Lexington, Kentucky, to engage in the practice of law. At this time, he married Lucretia Clay, a granddaughter of Henry Clay. She died in 1860.

=== Civil War ===
Despite his father's Unionist position (the elder Breckinridge supported the election of Lincoln), William entered the Confederate States Army in 1861. He was commissioned as a captain. He served in the cavalry under John Hunt Morgan. By the war's end, he was Colonel of the 9th Kentucky Cavalry. He also served as a bodyguard to Jefferson Davis during his flight from Richmond.

Following the war, he returned to Lexington, Kentucky, where he resumed the legal profession, teaching jurisprudence at the University of Kentucky.

=== Post-Civil War ===
From 1866 to 1868, he also served as the editor of the Lexington Observer and Reporter. In 1869, Breckinridge ran unsuccessfully for county attorney, losing in large part because he supported allowing African-Americans to testify in the courts. He was elected to the United States House of Representatives in 1884 as a Democrat and was re-elected four times, serving from 1885 to 1895.

He had, in later years, married Issa Desha. After she died in 1892, he married Louise Wing.

In 1890, he became a charter member of the District of Columbia Society of the Sons of the American Revolution. He was a Mason, and a member of the Masonic Knights Templar.

In 1893, his long-time mistress Madeline V. Pollard filed suit against Breckinridge for breach of promise for his failure to marry her as promised. The trial was a national sensation; the revelations of Breckinridge's infidelity and his weak defense of the breach of promise charge led to the loss of the lawsuit and contributed to the end of his political career.

In 1896, he ran for Congress on a strong currency fusion ticket but was defeated. After this, he was hired by the Lexington Morning Herald as their chief editorial writer.

At the November 1901 Convention of the State Federation of Labor in Lexington, Breckinridge delivered an eloquent speech in which he extolled the virtues of a six-day workweek, opposed violent strikes, and encouraged negotiations. The following day, the group's vice president, James D. Wood, took over the convention and helped pass resolutions that called Breckinridge an "enemy of the trade and labor organizations of the state." The controversy which followed split the federation's membership.

== Support of racial equality ==
After the Civil War, William Breckinridge became an advocate of racial equality. The sooner Americans rid themselves of cruel racists in their midst, he said, "the sooner they will realize that their institutions are in no danger, their civilization is not at stake, and that their permanent and practical undisputed sway can not be overturned." He opposed literacy tests and other means of black disenfranchisement, hoping that someday, "all races might enjoy a common liberty secured by an imperial law."

As editor of the Observer and Reporter in 1866–1868, he advocated the repeal of the restrictions on Negro testimony. Breckinridge and other "New Departure" men believed that admitting blacks to full civil rights, including the right to testify against whites, was a prerequisite for progress. Unusually, they proposed to accomplish this through the Democratic Party, which at this time was for white supremacy.

As an attorney, he represented blacks in court. When a Franklin County black man was convicted of murdering a prominent citizen who had led a mob to seize him, Breckinridge fought to obtain a pardon. In 1869, Breckinridge ran for state's attorney in Boyle County, and the testimony question was the central issue of his campaign. He intended to admit black testimony in all cases and upheld Fayette County as an example that the whole state should follow.

As a U.S. Representative, Breckinridge had asked the commissioner of labor to retain a black Census Office worker who feared that he would be fired because of race.

He expressed admiration for both Booker T. Washington and W. E. B. DuBois. Comparing Booker T. Washington's Up From Slavery with DuBois' The Souls of Black Folk, he called both books "remarkable contributions" to literature and termed Souls "the most significant and remarkable utterance yet published by a negro." He recommended both books and both men to his readers.

A young black lawyer offered aid to Breckinridge during his 1894 problems, noting that he had helped many "young colored men" in their law careers. Breckinridge predicted a better day for race relations: "Barriers will be removed, prejudices will die, class distinctions be obliterated. Not at once, not in our day; not without fierce contest; not without heroism and sacrifice, but yet slowly, surely, the day grows stronger; the sun rises higher toward the better noon and the glad twilight." Echoing his father, he wrote: "The negro is a man and the race in its essential unity is one race. Of one blood were all men made."

== Family and death ==
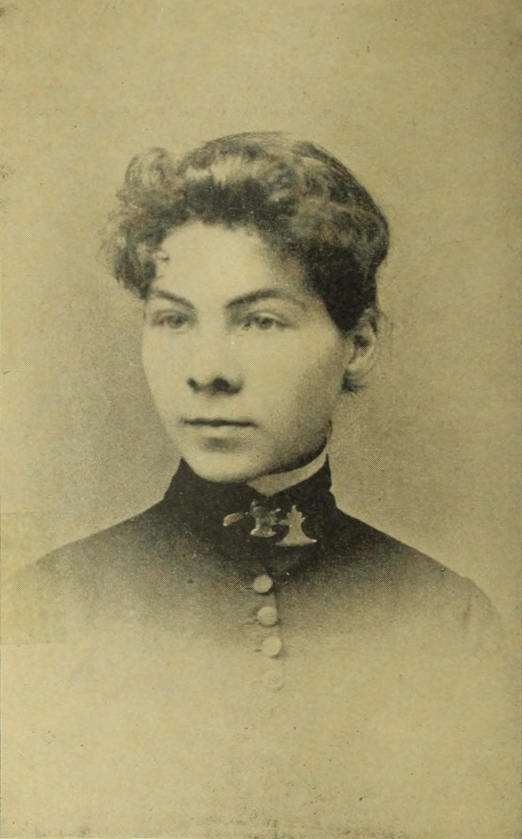
Madeline Pollard

In 1859, Breckinridge married Lucia Clay. In 1861, he married Issa Desha; they were the parents of Sophonisba Breckinridge, Desha Breckinridge, and Robert Jefferson Breckinridge. In 1893, he married Louise Scott Wing. In 1893, Madeline Pollard brought suit for breach of promise for his failure to make good on a promise of marriage. Breckinridge lost the ensuing court battle and shortly thereafter, failed to win reelection to Congress. Kentucky women, including members of the Kentucky Equal Rights Association (KERA), organized a successful campaign against his reelection.

Breckinridge died November 18, 1904, and is interred in Lexington Cemetery.

== See also ==
- Breckinridge family in the American Civil War
- Kentucky in the American Civil War
- List of federal political sex scandals in the United States

U.S. House of Representatives
Preceded by Joseph C.S. Blackburn	United States Representative from Kentucky's 7th district 1885–1895	Succeeded by William C. Owens
