= Joseph Cabell Breckinridge Sr. =

United States general (1842–1920)

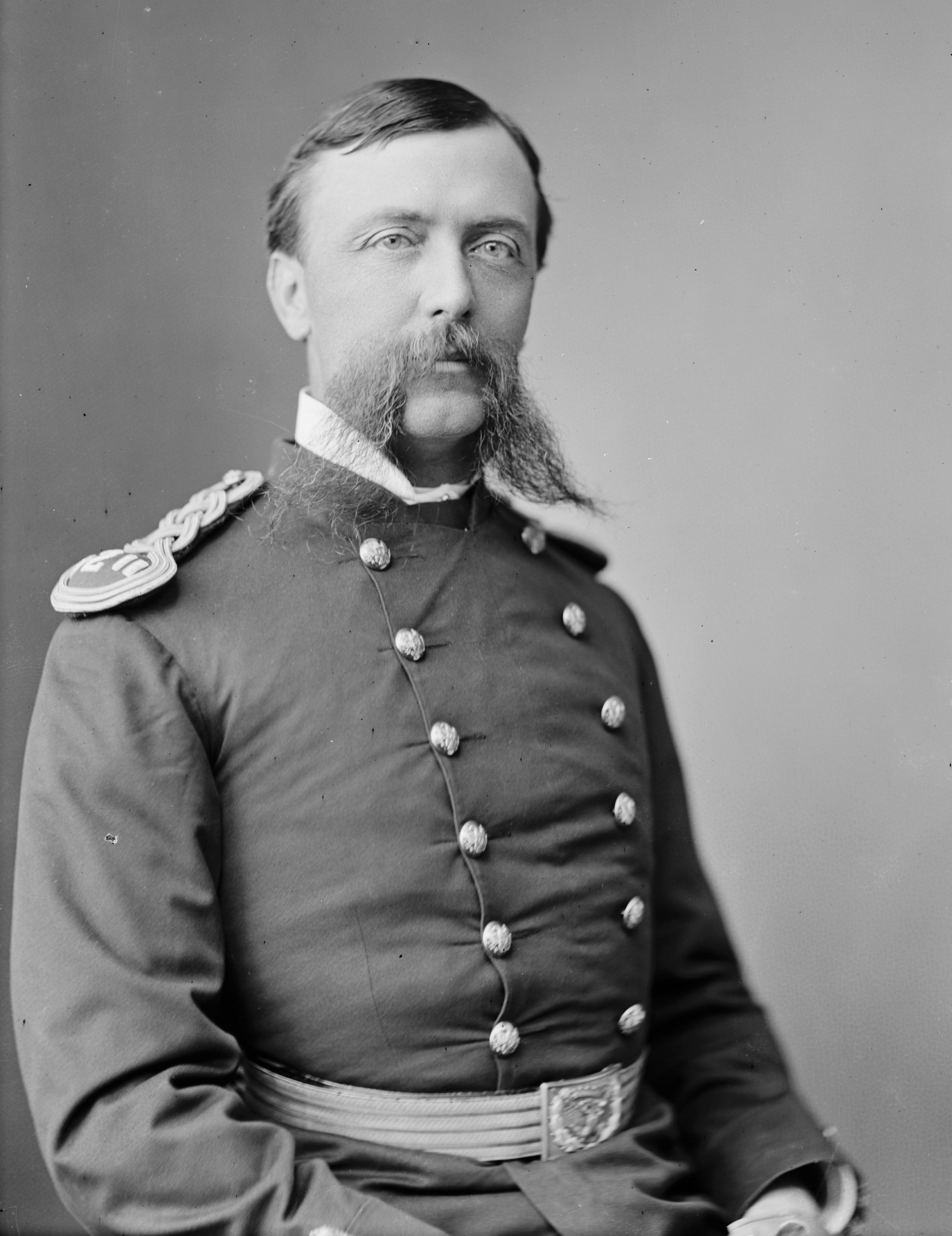

Inspector General of the United States Army
- In office January 30, 1889 – April 11, 1903
- Preceded by: Roger Jones
- Succeeded by: Peter D. Vroom

Personal details
- Born: Joseph Cabell Breckinridge; January 14, 1842 Baltimore, Maryland, U.S.
- Died: August 18, 1920 (aged 78) Washington, D.C., U.S.
- Resting place: Lexington Cemetery
- Spouse: Louise Ludlow Dudley (m. 1868; died 1911)
- Children: 11, including Joseph Jr., Scott, and Henry
- Parent(s): Robert Jefferson Breckinridge; Ann Sophonisba Preston

Military service
- Years of service: 1861–1903
- Rank: Major general
- Battles/wars: American Civil War; Spanish–American War
- Awards: Civil War Campaign Medal; Indian Campaign Medal; Spanish Campaign Medal

Joseph Cabell Breckinridge Sr. (January 14, 1842 – August 18, 1920) was a Union Army officer from Kentucky during the American Civil War. In later life, he became a brigadier general in the U.S. Regular Army and Inspector General of the Army as well as a major general of volunteers in the Spanish–American War.

== Early life ==
Breckinridge was born in 1842, a member of the prominent Breckinridge family, in Baltimore, Maryland. His parents were Ann Sophonisba Preston Breckinridge (1803–1844) and Robert Jefferson Breckinridge (1800–1871), a Presbyterian minister, politician, public office holder and abolitionist who was one of the most distinguished divines and one of the most prolific writers of the century. His father served as a leader of the Kentucky emancipation party in 1849 and was a strong Union man in 1861 at the outbreak of the Civil War.

His cousin, John C. Breckinridge, a Confederate major general and former Vice President of the United States, and his two oldest brothers fought for the Confederacy, while he and his second youngest brother Charles Henry Breckinridge fought for the Union.

== Career ==
In August 1861, Breckinridge joined the U.S. Army and was appointed an aide-de-camp to George H. Thomas, and served with him at Mill Springs and Shiloh. While serving at Corinth, he was commissioned a lieutenant in the 2nd US Artillery. He served in the Atlanta campaign, and was captured following the death of James B. McPherson. After being exchanged, he served out the remainder of the war as a mustering officer, and received brevet promotions to captain (July 1864) and major (March 1865). He received promotions to the full ranks of captain and major in 1874 and 1881 respectively.

On January 30, 1889, Breckinridge was promoted to brigadier general and Inspector General of the Army. He was promoted to Major General of volunteers in the Spanish–American War. He served on the staff of V Corps in Cuba and was engaged in the battles of El Caney and San Juan Hill, where he had a horse shot from under him.

General Breckinridge retired from the Army on April 12, 1903, having been promoted to major general the day before.

== Personal life ==
Major General Breckinridge was married to Louise Ludlow Dudley (1849–1911), daughter of Ethelbert Ludlow Dudley of Lexington, Kentucky in July 1868. Together, they were the parents of:

- Mary Dudley Breckinridge (1869–1939), who married John Fore Hines (1870–1941).
- Robert Jefferson Breckinridge (1871–1871), who died young.
- Joseph Cabell Breckinridge Jr. (1872–1898), who was washed overboard and drowned in Cuban waters while serving on the torpedo boat USS Cushing (TB-1).
- Louise Dudley Breckinridge (1874–1874), who died young.
- Ethelbert Ludlow Dudley Breckinridge (1875–1914), who fought in the Philippine–American War and married Genevieve Pearson Mattingly (1878–1957).
- Mabell Warfield Breckinridge (1877–1878), who died young.
- Lucian Scott Breckinridge (1879–1941), who married Elinor Wilkinson (1879–1952).
- Scott Dudley Breckinridge (1882–1941), an Olympian and physician who married Gertrude Ashby Bayne (1883–1981).
- Charles Henry Preston Breckinridge (1884–1885), who died young.
- Henry Skillman Breckinridge (1886–1960), who served as the United States Assistant Secretary of War under President Woodrow Wilson.
- John P. Breckenridge (1890–1960).

General Breckinridge was a member of the Sons of the American Revolution (SAR). He served as president of the District of Columbia Society in 1894 and as President General of the National Society of the SAR from 1900 until 1901. He was also a member of the Military Order of the Loyal Legion of the United States, Grand Army of the Republic and the Military Order of Foreign Wars.

== Dates of rank ==
- 2nd Lieutenant - 14 April 1862
- 1st Lieutenant - 1 August 1863
- Brevet Major - 13 March 1865
- Captain - 17 June 1874
- Major - 19 January 1881
- Lieutenant Colonel - 5 February 1885
- Colonel - 22 September 1885
- Brigadier General - 30 January 1889
- Major General, Volunteers - 4 May 1898
- Mustered out of Volunteers - 30 May 1898
- Major General - 11 April 1903
- Retired - 12 April 1903

== See also ==
- Breckinridge family in the American Civil War
- Kentucky in the American Civil War

Military offices
Preceded by Roger Jones	Inspector General of the U. S. Army; 1889–1903	Succeeded by Peter D. Vroom
