= Henry Clay McDowell =

American businessman and noted Standardbred horse breeder

- Born: February 9, 1832; New York City, New York, US
- Died: November 18, 1899 (aged 67); Lexington, Kentucky, US
- Occupations: Railway executive Standardbred horse breeder
- Political party: Republican
- Spouse: Anne Smith Clay (1837-1917)
- Children: Nanette (1859-1948); Henry Clay Jr. (1861-1933); William Adair (1863-1925); Thomas Clay (1866-1935); Julia Prather (1868-1942); Madeline (1872-1920); Ballard (1877-1881)
- Parent: William C. McDowell

Henry Clay McDowell (February 9, 1832 – November 18, 1899) was an American businessman and noted breeder of Standardbred horses.

In 1857, he married Anne Smith Clay, daughter of Henry Clay Jr., with whom he had seven children. They made their home in Louisville, Kentucky until 1883, when they purchased Ashland Farm in Lexington, Kentucky that had belonged to Anne Clay McDowell's famous grandfather, Henry Clay.

During the American Civil War, Henry McDowell served with the Union Army. He rose to the rank of major as a member of the staff of General William Rosecrans. In business, McDowell was president of the Lexington and Eastern Railway.

In 1883, McDowell purchased Dictator, a top Standardbred sire who was one of the four influential sons of Hambletonian.

Henry Clay McDowell died at age sixty-seven in 1899. In his obituary, the San Francisco Call newspaper wrote that he was "probably the best known citizen of Kentucky in private life."

Son Henry Jr. was a distinguished jurist and son Thomas was a successful horseman who won the 1902 Kentucky Derby. Daughter Madeline was a noted social reformer whose efforts were focused on child welfare, health issues, and women's rights.
