= Sophonisba Breckinridge =

American lawyer and social reformer (1866–1948)

Sophonisba Preston Breckinridge
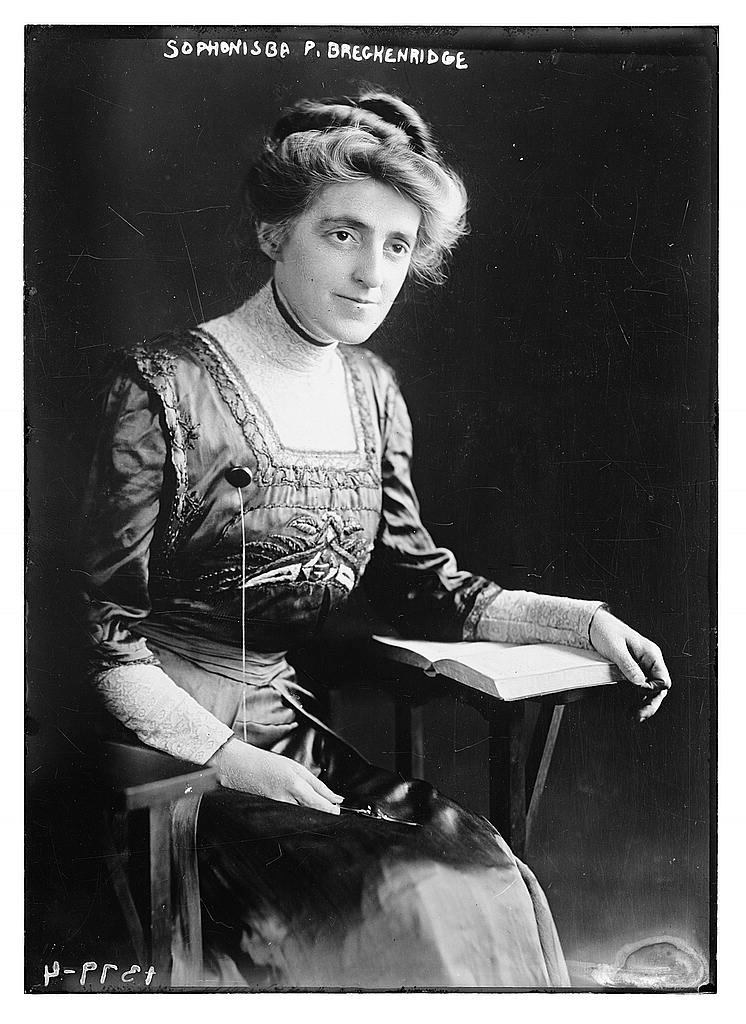
- Born: April 1, 1866; Lexington, Kentucky, U.S.
- Died: July 30, 1948 (aged 82); Chicago, Illinois, U.S.
- Occupations: economist, social work researcher, political scientist, lawyer, suffragist, mathematics teacher, diplomat
- Parent(s): Issa Desha Breckinridge (1843–1892) and William Campbell Preston Breckinridge (1837–1904)

Sophonisba Preston Breckinridge (/sɒfɒˈnizbə prɛstən brɛkɛnrɪdʒ/; April 1, 1866 – July 30, 1948) was an American activist, Progressive Era social reformer, social scientist and innovator in higher education. She was the first woman to earn a Ph.D. in political science and economics then the J.D. at the University of Chicago, and to pass the Kentucky bar. In 1933, President Franklin D. Roosevelt sent her as a delegate to the 7th Pan-American Conference in Uruguay, making her the first woman to represent the U.S. government at an international conference. She led the process of creating the academic professional discipline and degree for social work. She had romantic relationships with Marion Talbot and Edith Abbott.

== Background ==
Born in Lexington, Kentucky, Sophonisba "Nisba" Preston Breckinridge was a member of the politically active and socially prominent Kentuckian elite, Desha family and Breckinridge family. She was the second child of seven of Issa Desha Breckinridge, the second wife of Col. William C.P. Breckinridge, a member of Congress from Kentucky, editor, and lawyer. Her paternal grandfather was the abolitionist minister Robert Jefferson Breckinridge; her maternal grandfather was General Joseph Desha, a U.S. Representative and the ninth governor of Kentucky. Her great-grandfather was John Breckinridge, the United States Attorney General. Her cousin, John C. Breckinridge, was Vice President of the United States during James Buchanan's presidency, and ran against Abraham Lincoln in 1860 presidential election. At fourteen, she attended the Kentucky Agricultural & Mechanical College (later called the University of Kentucky) when it opened to women in 1880. She was not allowed to be degree-seeking, but studied there for four years.

== Early life and education ==
Breckinridge graduated from Wellesley College in 1888 and worked for two years as a high school mathematics teacher in Washington, D.C.. She traveled in Europe for the next two years, returning to Lexington in 1892 when her mother suddenly died. She studied the legal system in her father's law office and in 1895 became the first woman admitted to the Kentucky bar.

Since Breckinridge had few clients who would hire a woman lawyer, she left Kentucky to become a secretary to Marion Talbot, the Dean of Women at the University of Chicago. She enrolled as a graduate student eventually receiving a Ph.M. degree in 1897, and a Ph.D. in political science and economics in 1901 from the University of Chicago. Her thesis for the Ph.M. degree was on "The Administration of Justice in Kentucky," and her Ph.D. in Political Science came in 1903 with her dissertation, "Legal Tender: A Study in English and American Monetary History." Meanwhile, she was appointed in 1902 as assistant dean of women of the university, and the next year she was hired as an instructor. In 1904, she became the first woman to graduate from the University of Chicago Law School. "My record there was not distinguished," she later wrote in her autobiography, "but the faculty and students were kind, and the fact that the law school, like the rest of the University...accepted men and women students on equal terms publicly". She also became the first woman to be admitted to the Order of the Coif, an honorary legal scholastic society. A news writer in Paris, Kentucky announced her achievement and gushed that Breckinridge, "is considered one of the most brilliant women in the South."

== Social scientist ==
As a social scientist teaching and conducting research at the University of Chicago, Breckinridge focused on the intersection of social problems, public policy, and social reforms with an emphasis on immigrants, African Americans, child laborers, and working women in American urban centers, among other issues. From the beginning, she took an activist approach and became involved with the Women's Trade Union League (WTUL), serving as a factory inspector.

In 1907 she joined the Hull House project and began in earnest to work with the leaders of the Chicago settlement house movement, Jane Addams, Mary McDowell, and Margaret Dreier Robins on such issues as vocational training, housing, juvenile delinquency, and truancy. Breckinridge also collaborated with Vassar College graduate and social reformer Julia Lathrop and social gospel minister Graham Taylor (theologian), a founder of the settlement house Chicago Commons, to create the Chicago School of Civics and Philanthropy, becoming its first dean. By 1920, Breckinridge and Lathrop convinced the Board of the School to merge it into the University of Chicago, forming the Graduate School of Social Service Administration. By 1927 the faculty of this new academic unit created the scholarly journal Social Service Review which remains the premier journal in the field of social work. Breckinridge and Edith Abbott were the founding editors, and Breckinridge worked on its publication every year until her death in 1948.

By 1909, Breckinridge had become an assistant professor of social economy, and over ten years later, in 1920, she finally convinced her male colleagues of her research abilities and earned tenure as associate professor at the University of Chicago. From 1923 to 1929, she was also dean in the College of Arts, Literature and Science. She earned full professorship in 1925, and in 1929 she served as the dean of pre-professional social service students and Samuel Deutsch professor of public welfare administration until her retirement from the faculty in 1933.

== Personal life ==
When she came to the University of Chicago in 1895, Breckinridge formed a close relationship with the Dean of Women, Marion Talbot. Although she remained close to Talbot throughout her life, by the 1910s her primary relationship was with Edith Abbott. Breckinridge and Abbott worked together closely at the School of Social Service Administration. The pair also promoted social welfare policy.

== Great Depression and New Deal ==
Breckinridge and Abbott played an important role in designing, promoting, and implementing several New Deal programs, including the Social Security Act of 1935, which laid the groundwork for the modern welfare state. A lifelong advocate of maximum hour and minimum wage legislation, Breckinridge also helped promote the Fair Labor Standards Act of 1938.

== Important works ==
=== The Delinquent Child and the Home (1912) ===
The Delinquent Child and the Home was one of Breckinridge's first books. It was published in 1912 and looked specifically at crime, consequences, and criminal records of children in Chicago. There are eleven chapters that explained the study and expected outcomes of children that lived in different settings in the city.

The first chapter, "Discretion of the Inquiry" talked about children who were charged with crimes during this period, how the family unit had an impact, and how the courts of the time needed to make adjustments in its system when working with juveniles.

"The Child of the Immigrant: The Problem of Adjustment" looked at the impact of children growing up in ethnic enclaves in Chicago in the early 1900s. Breckinridge alluded to examples of young people adjusting to life in the United States and their understanding of what it meant to live in America while living a different kind of life in the home that tied back to their own roots or their parents' cultures.

"The Poor Child: The Problem of Poverty" discussed how poverty often is the reason for juvenile delinquency. Breckinridge said it was usually because they were engaging in activities in order to survive, help their families, or did not have a school to go to that may have helped in lessening delinquent activity.

"The Child Without Play: The Problem of Neighborhood" specifically referred to Chicago's West Side in the early 1900s and explained how dense neighborhoods were often where the most crime occurs among children because of the lack of parks and space for children to roam freely.

In "The Child from the Comfortable Home: The Problem of the Unmanageable", Breckinridge discussed in the final parts of her book about how there could be underlying problems from growing up. Though most of these children were from good homes and lived under authority, sometimes they were sent to boarding schools where they might be better disciplined. Breckinridge talked about how children from different classes were treated by explaining how children from families of higher social status were put in a boarding school while children from families of lower social classes usually faced court or were put in a state-mandated institution.

=== The Modern Household (1912) ===
Written in 1912, The Modern Household analyzes the stereotypically feminine role in the domestic and social spheres. For those women who worked, Breckinridge and Talbot point out, they would end up with double obligations because they would also have to maintain a house. The wife would also need to maintain certain household style that indicated a wealthier lifestyle. There are assumptions such as that every house would have, at least, a housekeeper and multiple children. Talbot and Breckinridge incorporate the legal angles, economic perspectives, and social roles. This book serves focus on guiding the smallest details, such as preparation food, as well as covering the larger issues like house income. The authors remark how the world is already changing with the influx of technology. At the end of each chapter, she has a list of questions for the reader to reflect upon. The language used in The Modern Household is more formal but very clear.

=== New Homes for Old (1921) ===
In her book New Homes For Old, published in 1921, Breckinridge discusses various aspects of the immigrant experience when moving to the United States. She begins with the adjustment which these immigrants must undergo upon arrival and the process of finding a new home in an unfamiliar place. Breckinridge then transitions to an analysis of the relationships within the immigrant family, detailing work situations, family structures, and certain living conditions. In the next section, she addresses taking care of the household, focusing on the responsibilities of the woman in a family. She follows with an explanation of the financial needs and difficulties faced by immigrants, including currency changes, special events, property ownership, the irregularity of income, and buying items such as furniture and clothing. Next is a discussion of the care of children, addressing issues such as school, parental authority, and dealings with the juvenile court. The next two sections address organizations and institutions which offer and provides aid to immigrants. While some of these organizations are focused on specific immigrant groups, others are more general and provide both support and education for varied groups of immigrants. The final section of the book addresses the need for involvement of a social work agency for those immigrant families who have been unable to successfully adjust and are facing difficulties.

=== Marriage and the Civic Rights of Women: separate domicil and independent citizenship (1931) ===
Published in 1931, the focus of Marriage and the Civic Rights of Women: separate domicil and independent citizenship studied the effect of the Cable Acts on women born in other countries who, after moving to the United States, must prepare themselves for independent citizenship. The first section addresses a legal approach to the problem, concerning questions such as separate domicil (place of residence) for married women, their independent citizenship, and flaws in the citizenship legislation which the Cable Act did not correct. Also discussed is the situation of foreign-born women who marrying American citizens and thereby forfeited their nationality of origin without acquiring American citizenship in addition to a summary of the movement to implement an International Convention dealing with this subject. In the second section a social interpretation of these issues is established, presenting a case study based on interviews with a considerable number of women and some men living in Chicago. This case study illustrates the attitude, motivating forces, and problems of women born outside the United States who succeeded in obtaining their papers and have become citizens, those who have tried but failed, and those who have not yet tried.

=== Women in the Twentieth Century; A Study of Their Political, Social and Economic Activities (1933) ===
Women in the Twentieth Century; A Study of Their Political, Social and Economic Activities was published in 1933. Breckinridge's work shows her careful documentation of the social situations and cultural climates that produced various political, social, and economic interest groups. She provided the material in a clear, chronological manner with estimates of attendance to conferences and members, along with mission statements. From the beginning of the text, she demonstrates her observations by reflecting on the environment she lived in through her data collection. Breckinridge references other sociologists like Edith Abbott in her literature. In "Chapter II: The Nineties – An Introduction to the New Century," Breckinridge presents a detailed account of the beginning of women joining clubs. An example listed is the General Federation of Women's Clubs which was founded in 1890. This group had certain requirements that, in turn, restricted membership: "Article IV of the adopted constitution provided that clubs applying for membership in the General Federation must show that no sectarian or political test is required and that while distinctly humanitarian movements may be recognized, their chief purpose is not philanthropic or technical, but social, literary, artistic or scientific culture." The various groups formations begin with groups like The National American Woman Suffrage Association and the Women's Christian Associations but within the decade, there was also the National Society of the Daughters of the American Revolution, National Association of Colored Women, and the National Congress of Mothers All of these eventually evolved to include occupational focuses National Woman's Trade Union League, Quota International, the National Federation of Business and Professional Women's Clubs. She also focuses on the macro level as seen by "The Industrial Problem as it affects Women and Children." These business changes created legislation similar to current labor laws. For example, "no child under 14 years of age be employed in mill, factory, workshop, store, office, or laundry, and no boy under 16 years in mines" and required schools to provide education to the community. The trend of new groups emerging continued exponentially lead to a societal shift in understanding the social roles. Consequently, Breckinridge points out that the labor market has to change because up until this point, the majority of workers were men and their relationship had different connotations than with married women who wanted to work. Overall, Women in the Twentieth Century demonstrates her progressive and scrutinizing lens through which she views the world.

== Additional works ==
Breckinridge extensively published on family, public welfare, and children:

- The Wage-earning Woman and the State: a reply to Miss Minnie Bronson (1910)
- Papers presented at the conferences held during the Chicago Child Welfare Exhibit, The Child in the City (New York, Amo Press, 1970 - reprint of the 1912 edition)
- Truancy and Non-Attendance in the Chicago Schools: a study of the social aspects of the compulsory education and child labor legislation of Illinois (1917)
- Madeline McDowell Breckinridge: a Leader in the New South. Chicago, Illinois: The University of Chicago Press, 1921.
- Family Welfare Work in the Metropolitan Community: selected case records, Chicago: The University of Chicago Press (The University of Chicago Social Service Series) 1924.
- Public Welfare Administration in the United States, select documents (1927)
- The Illinois adoption law and its administration (1928)
- The Family and the State, select documents (1934)
- The Ohio poor law and its administration ... and appendixes with selected decisions of the Ohio Supreme Court (1934)
- Public welfare administration, with special reference to the organization of state departments; outline and bibliography; supplementary to Public welfare administration in the United states: select documents (1934)*Social work and the courts; select statutes and judicial decisions (1934)
- The development of poor relief legislation in Kansas, by Grace A. Browning... and appendixes with court decisions edited by Sophonisba P. Breckinridge (1935)
- The Michigan poor law: its development and administration with special reference to state provision for medical care of the indigent / by Isabel Campbell Bruce and Edith Eickhoff, edited with an introductory note and selected court decisions by Sophonisba P. Breckinridge (1936)
- Indiana poor law; its development and administration, with special reference to the provisions of state care for the sick poor (1936)
- The Tenements of Chicago, 1908–1935 (New York: Arno Press, 1970; reprint of 1936 edition)
- The illegitimate child in Illinois, by Dorothy Frances Puttee ... and Mary Ruth Colby ... edited by Sophonisba P. Breckinridge (1937)
- State administration of child welfare in Illinois (1937)
- The Illinois poor law and its administration (1939)
- The Stepfather in the Family (1940)

== Activism ==
Breckinridge was active in many national social and political causes, including:

- Women's suffrage
- African-American civil rights; she helped establish the NAACP, and chaired the Subcommittee on Colored Children that was a part of the State Department of Public Welfare
- Labor conditions; charter member of the Chicago branch of the Women's Trade Union League
- Immigration
- Children's protection and labor laws reform
- Progressive Party
- Pacifism

In 1907, when Breckinridge obtained an appointment as a part-time professor in the Department of Household Administration which was a part of the Sociology department of the University of Chicago, she became a resident of Hull House. She lived in Hull House during her yearly vacations, as well as while teaching and conducting research at the University of Chicago. In collaboration with her colleague Edith Abbott, Breckinridge helped establish the Wendell Phillips Settlement House on the West Side (at 2009 Walnut Street) where African-American social workers were trained. It held a day nursery, a Boy Scout division, a division especially for women and girls, a large public meeting space, and served as a center for 25 different community groups. The settlement house was put under the supervision of the Chicago Urban League in 1918.

She served as vice president of the National American Woman Suffrage Association in 1911. When the women of Chicago gained limited voting rights in 1913, Breckinridge ran for alderman in Chicago on the Progressive ticket, however unsuccessfully.

In 1915 she participated in the American delegation that attended the Women's Peace Congress at The Hague. There she served as a close associate and assistant for Jane Addams, who had served as chair of the Congress. Breckinridge spoke before the House Committee on Foreign Affairs in January 1916, along with other members of the Woman's Peace Party to lobby for a joint resolution to establish a "commission for enduring peace."

== Organization involvement ==
- American Association of Schools of Social Work (president in 1934)
- American Association of Social Workers, AASW (charter member then president of the Chicago branch)
- American Political Science Association
- American Social Science Association
- American Sociological Society
- Hull House Association
- Illinois Child Labor Committee
- Illinois Citizens Political Action Committee
- Illinois Welfare Association
- Immigrant's Protective League (charter director then secretary of the board until 1942)
- Joint Committee for Vocational Training (co-founder in 1911)
- League of Women Voters
- National American Woman's Suffrage Association (served as vice president in 1911)
- National Association for the Advancement of Colored People (founding member of Chicago branch)
- National Conference of Social Workers
- National Child Labor Committee
- National Consumers League
- National Probation Association
- National Urban League
- Phi Beta Kappa
- Urban League
- Vocational Supervision League
- Woman's City Club of Chicago (served as charter president)
- Woman's Peace Party (treasurer)
- Women's International League for Peace and Freedom
- Women's Trade Union League

== Death ==
Following her retirement from the faculty of the University of Chicago, Breckinridge continued to teach courses in public welfare until 1942. In Chicago, on July 30, 1948, Sophonisba Breckinridge died from a perforated ulcer and arteriosclerosis, aged 82. She is interred in Lexington (Kentucky) Cemetery in the Breckinridge family plot.

== Recognition ==
Breckinridge was the first woman U.S. representative to a high-level international conference, the 1933 Montevideo Conference.

In 1934, she was elected president of the American Association of Schools of Social Work, which later evolved into the Council on Social Work Education.

Breckinridge was awarded honorary degrees by:

- Oberlin College in 1919,
- University of Kentucky in 1925,
- Tulane University in 1939, and
- University of Louisville in 1940.

The University of Chicago housed undergraduate students in Breckinridge Hall, named after Sophonisba Breckinridge, from 1968 to 2001, then again from 2003 to 2016, when it was finally closed. The one House to occupy Breckinridge Hall, known as Breckinridge House, now resides in the nearby dorm known as International House. Students celebrate Sophie Day in the early spring.

Breckinridge is also a character in Sarah Schulman's 2009 novel The Mere Future.

== See also ==
- List of peace activists
- List of first women lawyers and judges in Kentucky
