= Ethelbert Ludlow Dudley =

American physician (1818–1862)

Ethelbert L. Dudley
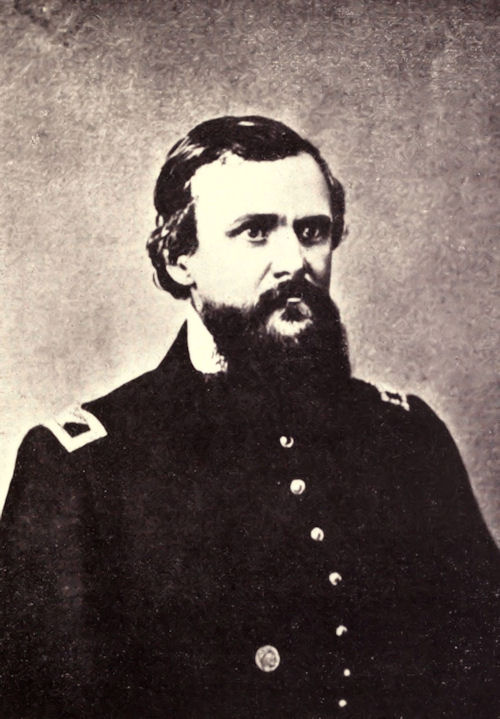
- Born: 1818; Lexington, Kentucky, U.S.
- Died: February 20, 1862 (aged 43–44); Columbia, Kentucky, U.S.
- Burial place: Lexington Cemetery
- Military career
- Allegiance: United States
- Branch: Union Army
- Unit: 21st Kentucky Infantry
- Conflicts: American Civil War

Ethelbert Ludlow Dudley (1818 – February 20, 1862) was a prominent Kentucky physician and a member of the faculty of Transylvania Medical School.

== Early life ==
Dudley, the son of Ambrose Dudley, was born near Lexington, Kentucky. He was educated at Harvard University and Transylvania Medical School.

== Medical career ==
Dudley studied under his famous uncle, Benjamin Dudley, at Transylvania Medical School; graduating in 1842 and joining the faculty. While at Transylvania, he held several positions including chair of the department of General and Pathological Anatomy. Dudley originated and was editor of the Transylvania Medical Journal. Additionally, Dudley was on faculty at the newly formed Kentucky School of Medical and the United States Marine Hospital of Louisville.

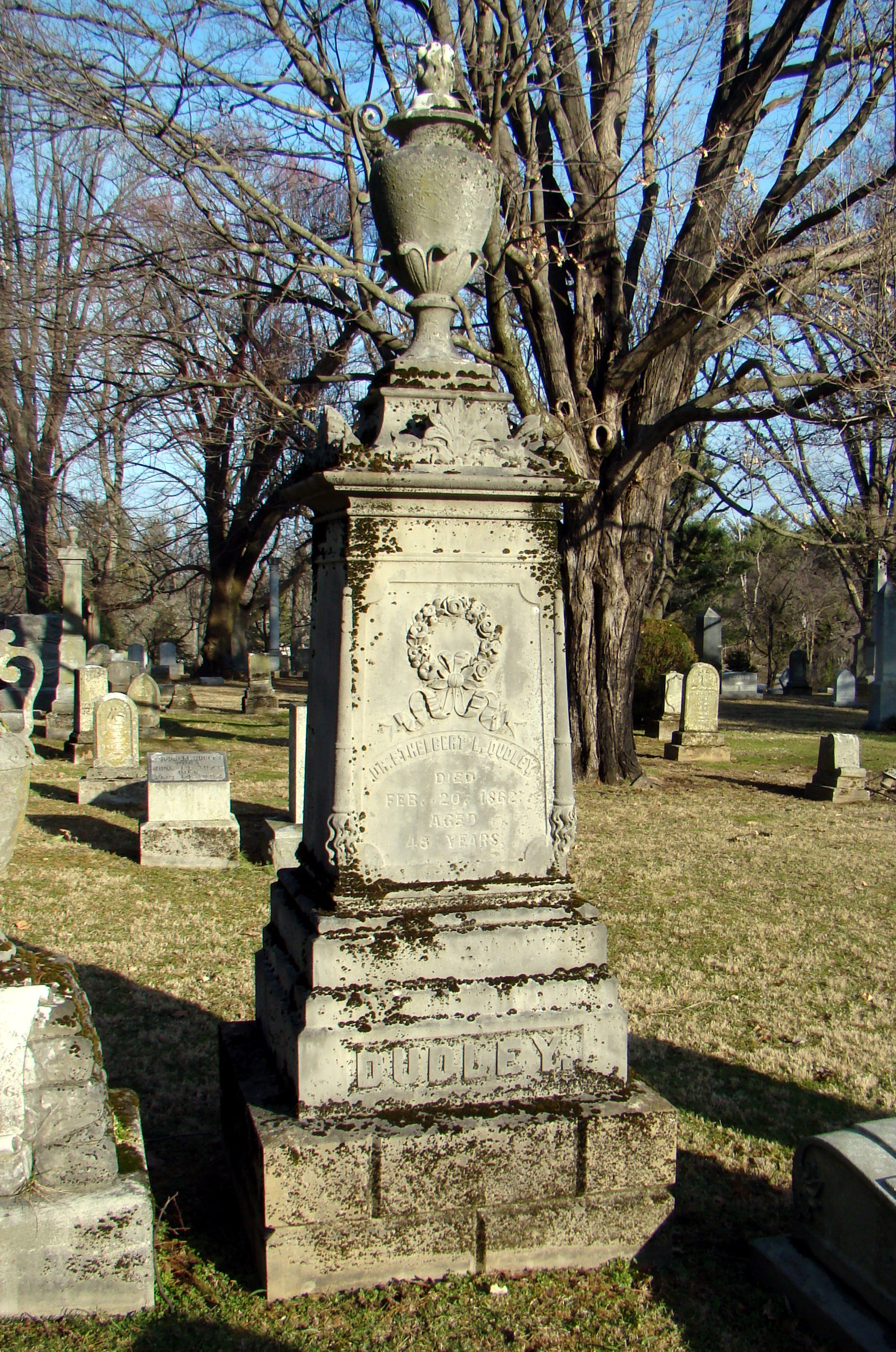
Grave of Dudley

== Military service and death ==
In 1862, Dudley died of typhoid fever in Columbia, Kentucky. At the time of his death he was serving in the 21st Kentucky Infantry during the American Civil War. He was interred at Lexington Cemetery.
