= Bunny Breckinridge =

American actor (1903–1996)

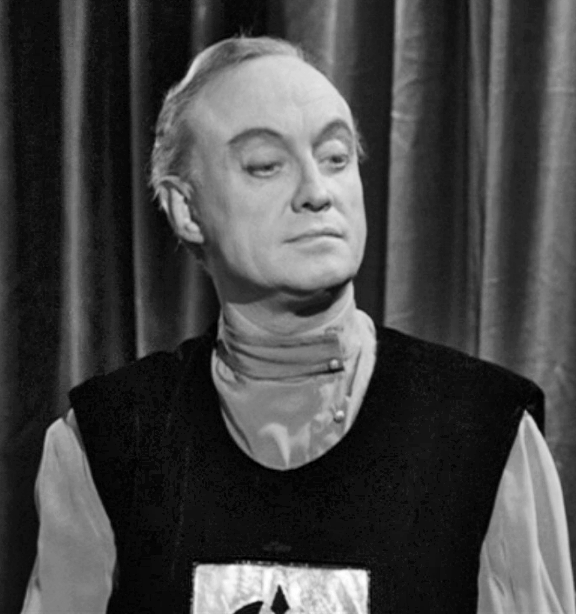
- Breckinridge in Plan 9 from Outer Space (1959)
- Born: John Cabell Breckinridge; August 6, 1903; Paris, France
- Died: November 5, 1996 (aged 93); Monterey, California, U.S.
- Education: Oxford University
- Occupations: Actor; drag queen
- Spouse: Roselle du Val de Dampierre (m. 1927; div. 1929)
- Children: 1

John Cabell "Bunny" Breckinridge (August 6, 1903 – November 5, 1996) was an American actor and drag queen, best known for his role as "The Ruler" in Ed Wood's film Plan 9 from Outer Space, his only film appearance.

== Family ==
He was the great-great-great-grandchild of U.S. Attorney General John Breckinridge (and the great-grandchild of both 14th U.S. Vice President and Confederate general John C. Breckinridge and Wells Fargo Bank founder Lloyd Tevis).

== Early life ==
Breckinridge was born in Paris, France; he spent time at Eton College and Oxford University in England.

== Career ==
=== Plan 9 from Outer Space ===
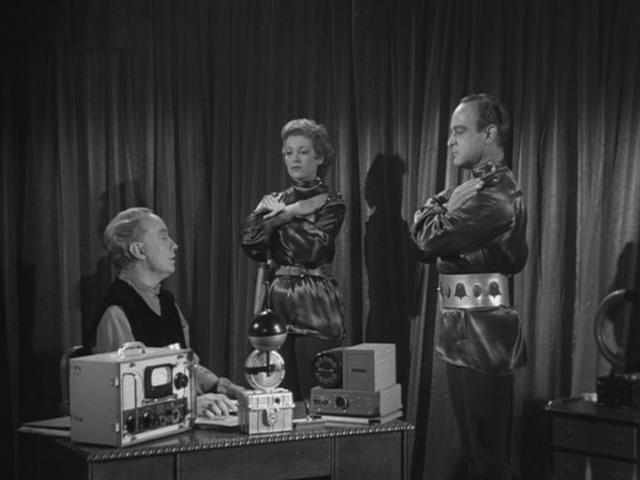
Breckinridge with fellow actors Joanna Lee and Dudley Manlove in Plan 9 from Outer Space

In 1956, Breckinridge agreed to play the role of an alien leader in the film Graverobbers from Outer Space (later retitled Plan 9 from Outer Space), directed by his friend, Ed Wood. Wood and Breckinridge were introduced to one another by their mutual friend Paul Marco, who played Kelton the Cop in three Wood films. The film premiered March 15, 1957, at the Carlton Theatre in Hollywood.

Breckinridge and Marco were living together in the latter's modest home at the time, despite the fact that he was a struggling B-movie actor and Breckinridge was an independently wealthy socialite. David Demering, who played the airplane co-pilot in the film, also lived with them.

Breckinridge's previous stage experience convinced Wood to cast him as the alien ruler who oversees an attempt to take over the Earth using an army of reanimated corpses. Indeed, his background made him one of the few truly experienced actors in the entire cast. Dressed in a pajama-like outfit which is curiously less ornate than those worn by his underlings, he sports very visible mascara and lipstick, and constantly rolls his eyes and mugs for the camera.

=== Later years ===
Breckinridge continued his theatrical career throughout the 1950s, but in small local productions, such as playing the role of The Inquisitor in Richard Bailey's production of The Lark in Carmel.

By 1980, Plan 9 from Outer Space had amassed a cult following among B-movie buffs as the "worst film ever made", making Breckinridge's name known to a new generation. Meanwhile, he returned to stage acting, appearing mostly in local productions in San Francisco.

In 1994, Breckinridge was surprised to find himself portrayed as a character in a major motion picture, played by Bill Murray in Tim Burton's 1994 biopic Ed Wood. His advanced years and failing health, however, prevented him from participating in any of the publicity surrounding the film.

== Personal life ==
In 1927, while working as a drag/burlesque entertainer in Paris, he married Roselle du Val de Dampierre (1903–1999), the daughter of Robert Henri du Val de Dampierre, a French Count, and Marie du Val de Dampierre (née Serailler). They divorced two years later, but had one daughter, Solange Prasad.

Breckinridge maintained homes on each coast – one in New Jersey and one in San Francisco.

He died on November 5, 1996, at age 93, in a nursing home in Monterey, California. He was quoted in his obituary as saying, "I was a little bit wild when I was young, darling, but I lived my life grandly."

=== Sexuality ===
Openly gay at a time when it was daring (and even dangerous) to be so, Breckinridge was well known for his flamboyant lifestyle, his outrageous sense of humor, and his penchant for perfume and costume jewelry. He performed in Shakespearean plays in England before moving to San Francisco in the late 1920s. He also frequently performed in drag.

In 1955, he was arrested in a San Francisco waterfront bar and charged with vagrancy and jailed, though the charges were later dropped because of his family and wealth.

In 1959, shortly after Plan 9 From Outer Space's disappointing DCA release, Breckinridge was convicted on ten counts of sex perversion for taking two underage boys on an excursion to Las Vegas. He was committed to the Atascadero State Hospital for the criminally insane, and released the following year.

Upon his release, he returned to his San Francisco home, a Spanish-style bungalow adorned with gold framed photographs of the many celebrities he met and befriended, including Princess Margaret, Noël Coward, J. Edgar Hoover, Elvis Presley, and Ed Sullivan. Breckinridge frequently opened his home to members of the growing hippie movement, who were enthralled not only by his stories of his flamboyant youth, but also his favorable opinions on free love and his encyclopedic knowledge of both gay history and the lives of closeted Hollywood stars.

=== Gender identity ===
In the 1940s, male-to-female sex change operations were becoming more widely available in Europe, and Breckinridge expressed many times his desire to undergo the procedure. With the nationwide attention given to Christine Jorgensen's sex change in 1952, Breckinridge became more determined than ever to begin transitioning. In 1954, he announced plans to travel to Denmark and undergo the operation so he could marry his male secretary. Breckinridge was by this time a grandparent, and his granddaughter supported him in his efforts. Shortly thereafter, a San Francisco judge scuttled his Denmark trip by ordering him into court for failing to make good on an earlier agreement to pay $8,500 a year to support his elderly, blind mother in England. He then made arrangements with a sex-change surgeon in Mexico, but had a serious car accident while traveling there. He gave up his pursuit of the matter afterwards.

In the 1960s, Breckinridge gave permission to the author Gore Vidal to write what Breckinridge thought would be a biography. However, though partly inspired by some events in real life, the bestselling book that resulted was a work of fiction: Myra Breckinridge.
