= Robert Jefferson Breckinridge =

American politician and minister (1800–1871)

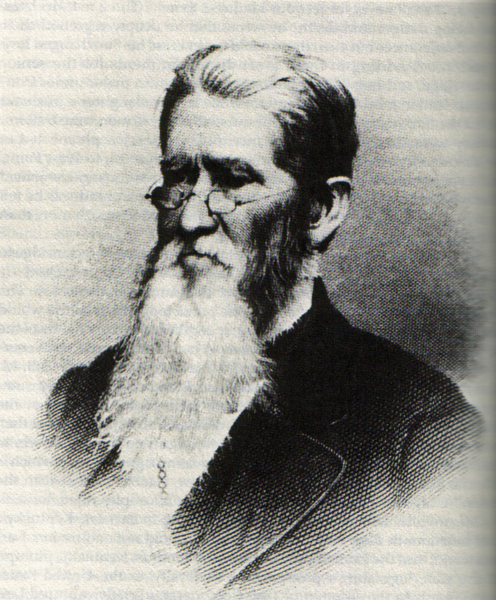
- Born: March 8, 1800; Cabell's Dale, Kentucky, U.S.
- Died: December 27, 1871 (aged 71); Danville, Kentucky, U.S.
- Education: Union College (B.A., 1819); Princeton University (Honorary M.A., 1832); Jefferson College (Honorary LL.D., 1847); Harvard University (LL.D., 1862)
- Spouses: Ann Sophonisba Preston (m. 1823; died 1844) Virginia Hart Shelby (m. 1847; died 1859) Margaret Faulkner White (m. 1868)
- Children: 14, including Willie, Joseph, Robert Jr., and Charles
- Parent(s): John Breckinridge; Mary Hopkins Cabell

Ecclesiastical career
- Church: Presbyterian
- Ordained: April 5, 1832
- Congregations: Second^{[a]} Presbyterian Church (Baltimore, Maryland); First Presbyterian Church (Lexington, Kentucky)
- Offices held: Kentucky state representative Kentucky Superintendent of Public Instruction

Robert Jefferson Breckinridge (March 8, 1800 – December 27, 1871) was a politician and Presbyterian minister. He was a member of the Breckinridge family of Kentucky, the son of Senator John Breckinridge.

A restless youth, Breckinridge was suspended from Princeton University for fighting, and following his graduation from Union College in 1819, was prone to engage in a lifestyle of partying and revelry. But, he was admitted to the bar in 1824 and elected to the Kentucky General Assembly in 1825. A serious illness and the death of a child in 1829 prompted him to turn to religion, and he became an ordained minister in 1832.

That year Breckinridge accepted the call to pastor the Second^{[a]} Presbyterian Church of Baltimore, Maryland. While at the church, he became involved in a number of theological debates. During the Old School-New School Controversy within the Presbyterian Church in the 1830s, Breckinridge became a hard-line member of the Old School faction, and played an influential role in the ejection of several churches in 1837. He was rewarded for his stances by being elected moderator of the Presbyterian Church's General Assembly in 1841.

After a brief stint as president of Jefferson College in Pennsylvania, Breckinridge returned to Kentucky, where he pastored the First Presbyterian church of Lexington, Kentucky, and was appointed superintendent of public education by Governor William Owsley. The changes he effected in this office brought a tenfold increase in public school attendance and led to him being called the father of the public school system in Kentucky. He left his post as superintendent after six years to become a professor at Danville Theological Seminary in Danville, Kentucky.

As the sectional conflict leading up to the Civil War escalated, Breckinridge was put in the unusual position of being a slaveholder who opposed slavery. The tragic scenario of brother against brother literally played out in Breckinridge's family, his sons fighting on both sides during the war. Following the war, Breckinridge retired to his home in Danville, where he died on December 27, 1871.

== Early life ==
Robert Breckinridge was born March 8, 1800, at Cabell's Dale near Lexington, Kentucky. He was the third son born to Senator John and Mary Hopkins (Cabell) Breckinridge. Senator Breckinridge died in 1806, leaving his wife to tend the family's large plantations. Robert soon earned a reputation of misbehaving. In one instance, he and his brother John had a physical altercation because Robert put salt in a blind cousin's coffee; in another, his mother gave him a "tremendous whipping" for beating an old slave.

Breckinridge studied education at a classical school operated by Dr. Louis Marshall, the brother of Chief Justice John Marshall, then followed his brothers, Cabell and John, to Princeton in 1817. His behavior problems continued there; in one year, he spent more than $1200. He was suspended for fighting, and although he was later reinstated, the incident soured him on Princeton, and he was granted an honorable release. (The school later awarded him an honorary Master of Arts degree in 1832.) Breckinridge enrolled at Yale University, but after three months, discovered that a one-year residency was required for graduation. Unwilling to complete this requirement, he moved to Union College in Schenectady, New York, where he earned a Bachelor of Arts degree in 1819.

Following his graduation, Breckinridge returned to Kentucky with no clear direction in his life. He began to amuse himself by attending various parties and other social engagements. During a visit to the state capital, he so offended one man that he was challenged to a duel. Though he obtained two pistols, he never accepted the man's challenge, and was branded a coward. The dispute was later settled in the Masonic Lodge of which both Breckinridge and the other man were members.

On March 11, 1823, Breckinridge married his cousin, Ann Sophonisba Preston, at her home in Abingdon, Virginia. The couple had 11 children, including Willie, Joseph, Robert Jr., and Charles. Ann's political heritage rivaled that of her husband. A grandniece of Patrick Henry, she was also a sister to Senator William Campbell Preston and a sister-in-law to South Carolina governor Wade Hampton III, and Virginia governors John B. Floyd and James McDowell.

== Service in the Kentucky General Assembly ==
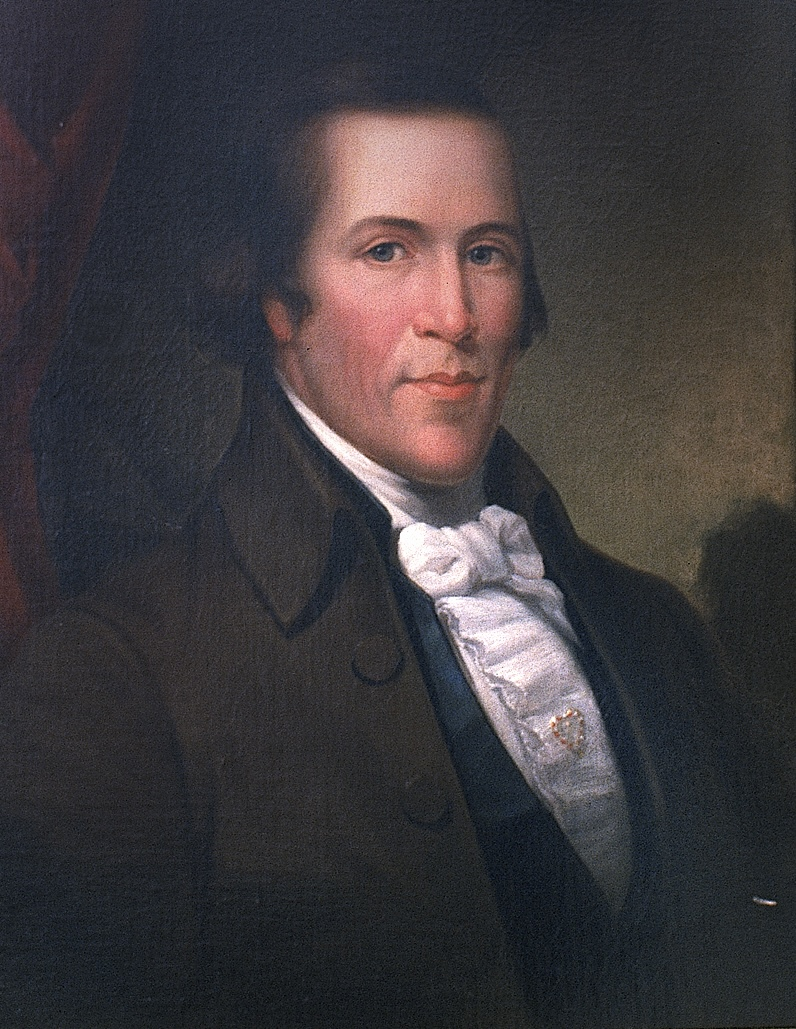
Robert Breckinridge's actions as a Kentucky Representative put him at odds with reasoning espoused by his late father, Senator John Breckinridge

Following the advice of his older brother, Breckinridge obtained his law license on January 3, 1824, but the practice of law did not suit him. He instead decided to follow the family tradition and seek public office, campaigning for a seat in the Kentucky House of Representatives. Even in his early political career, he began to articulate his stance on the issues that would become his legacy.

First, he shunned the states' rights viewpoint, stressing instead the need for a strong interdependence between the states. Second, he called for an end to slavery. Third, he emphasized the importance of education. Though they agreed on this last point, Breckinridge's father had ardently opposed emancipation of slaves and favored states' rights. Historian James C. Klotter opines that Louis Marshall and Robert's mother Mary may have influenced his positions.

The most politically charged issue in Kentucky during Breckinridge's campaign, however, was the Old Court-New Court controversy. The Panic of 1819 had left many Kentuckians in dire financial straits. Legislators sought to relieve some of the financial burden by passing a law of replevin which favored debtors. The Kentucky Court of Appeals, (the highest court in the Commonwealth at the time,) declared the law unconstitutional. The next year, an incensed General Assembly passed legislation that dissolved the court and replaced it with a new court. Neither court acknowledged the other as valid, and a confused public lost respect for public authority in general. The issue was generally split along party lines, with Democrats generally favoring the New Court and Whigs favoring the Old Court.

Breckinridge dodged the issue during the campaign, which he won in 1825, but once he took office, he had to come down on one side or the other. He voted in favor of the Old Court, reflecting his upper-class status and affinity for the establishment. In so doing, he identified himself with the party of Kentucky's favorite son, Henry Clay. The Whigs would control Kentucky politics for the next twenty-five years. In 1826, the majority of the General Assembly sided with the Old Court and abolished the New Court.

Eventually, tensions faded, but a bigger decision awaited Robert Breckinridge in 1828. He was chosen to sit on a committee that would draft Kentucky's response to the Nullification Crisis. Because much of South Carolina's reasoning for their actions was based on the logic of the Kentucky Resolutions, which had been supported by Senator John Breckinridge, Robert Breckinridge now had to determine whether he should support the words of his late father or refute them. In the end, his Unionist sympathies overrode his sense of loyalty to his father; he sided with the committee's majority in condemning South Carolina's actions.

== Religious conversion and ministry ==
Throughout his time in the General Assembly, Breckinridge had battled with typhoid fever. In an 1828 letter to his wife, who was visiting relatives in Virginia, he recounted that he had been bedridden and near death for two months. Finally, in February 1829, the illness subsided. Only then could he be told about the death of his daughter, Louisiana, which had occurred a month earlier. The illness, combined with the news of the death of his daughter, caused Breckinridge to turn to religion.

In spring 1829, he made a public profession of his faith. In 1831, he hosted a revival meeting on his farm during which he decided to pursue ministerial training under the West Lexington Presbytery. He was ordained as a Presbyterian minister on April 5, 1832.

Breckinridge served as a Ruling Elder at the Presbyterian General Assembly of 1832, then relocated to Princeton, New Jersey, to study under Samuel Miller at Princeton Theological Seminary. In November 1832, he succeeded his brother John as pastor of Second^{[a]} Presbyterian Church of Baltimore, Maryland. His tenure saw numerous converts, but he was put at odds with his brother and Samuel Miller over practices employed in his church. His counselors were also concerned that he was wavering on his belief in the doctrine of limited atonement. Eventually, he was persuaded back into the doctrines of the orthodox Calvinism and became one of the leaders of the Old School Presbyterian movement.

Now solidly in the Presbyterian fold, Breckinridge began to follow in the footsteps of his brother John, criticizing Roman Catholicism in a number of his speeches and publications. There were many Catholics in Baltimore. He sponsored and edited two "thoroughly Protestant" journals – the Baltimore Literary and Religious magazine and the Spirit of the XIX Century. A year-long tour of Europe with his wife that began in April 1836 deepened his disdain for the denomination; he opined that most of the continent's ills could be traced back to Catholic "superstitions." A particularly harsh missive against a Catholic who worked in the county almshouse drew an indictment for libel in 1840. The trial ended in a hung jury that voted 10–2 in favor of acquittal. Though displeased that he could not obtain a unanimous acquittal, Breckinridge continued undaunted. In 1841, he published several of his anti-Catholic articles as Papism in the XIX Century in the United States, and in 1843 added his recommendation to Louis Giustiniani's anti-Catholic book.

Breckinridge was equally controversial in internal church politics. He rebuked the Synod of the Western Reserve for de-emphasizing and effectively abandoning the office of Ruling Elder. He also condemned the governance of Presbyterian missionaries by anyone other than the Presbyterian church. In 1834, he was the chief author of the Act and Testimony, a document summarizing the contentions between the Old and New Schools. The New School resented Breckinridge and those who signed the Act and Testimony, and even some in the Old School camp had hoped for a more moderate course. The differences between the Old and New Schools widened over the teachings of Albert Barnes, and the New School members were ejected from the Presbyterian Church in 1837. Because of his leadership in the Old School-New School controversy, Breckinridge was elected moderator of the Old School branch's General Assembly in 1841.

== President of Jefferson College ==
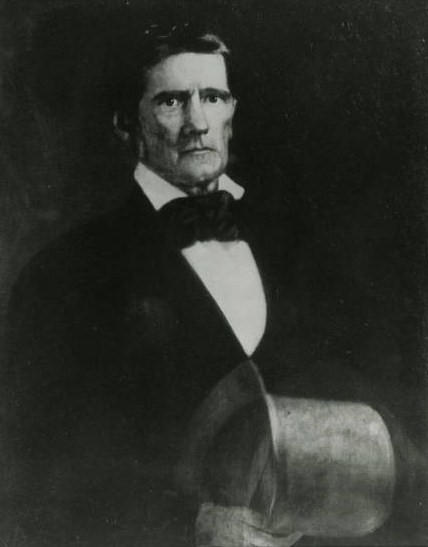
Portrait of Breckinridge as President of Jefferson College

In 1844, Breckinridge's wife Ann died. Lingering sadness and memories of his and Ann's life in Baltimore may have led him to leave the city and the pastorate he had held for twelve years. He was offered pastorate of the Second Presbyterian Church of Lexington, Kentucky, but instead, accepted the presidency of Jefferson College in Pennsylvania in 1845 against the advice of his brothers John and William. A rift between Breckinridge and his brother Cabell's widow and other relatives may help account for this surprising decision. He did not feel he could yet return to his home state.

Breckinridge was inaugurated as president of Jefferson College on September 27, 1845. During his tenure, he also pastored a church in the city of Canonsburg, Pennsylvania. College administration apparently did not suit him, however. A student uprising against the president and the faculty occurred in 1846, hastening the end of his short stay at the school. A desire to see his children, most of whom were living with relatives scattered throughout Kentucky and Virginia, also factored into his decision to resign his post in 1847. On his resignation, he was awarded an honorary LL.D from the school.

== Father of Kentucky's public school system ==
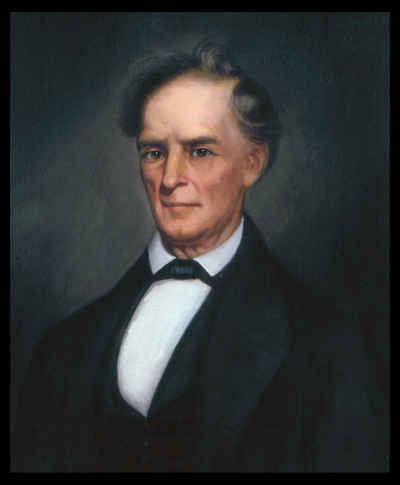
Breckinridge was appointed superintendent of public education by Governor William Owsley

Breckinridge returned to Kentucky, accepting the pastorate of First Presbyterian Church of Lexington. His return to Kentucky was also motivated by a growing fondness for his cousin, Virginia Hart Shelby, who had cared for two of his children during his stay in Pennsylvania. Virginia was the widow of Alfred Shelby, the son of Isaac Shelby, who was twice governor of Kentucky. Their written exchanges included love poems from Robert and concerned questions from Virginia about the wisdom of engaging in a relationship. Despite being advised by her sisters to avoid the marriage and her own wavering on the issue, the two were married in April 1847. They had three children, only one of whom, John Robert, survived to adulthood, but was later killed by John L. Anderson, son of Mayor J. M. Anderson.

Disagreements among the children of both partners' previous marriages exacerbated an already tense union, which almost ended in divorce in September 1856. Robert managed to reconcile with his wife, and they remained together until Virginia's death in 1859.

Breckinridge's personal turmoil did not hinder his political accomplishments. He was appointed Superintendent of Public Instruction by Governor William Owsley. He was the sixth person to hold the office since its creation in the 1830s. The task was daunting. Only one of every ten school-age children in Kentucky ever attended school, and at least thirty Kentucky counties had received no state educational funds since 1840.

Breckinridge began reforms immediately and zealously. He secured the General Assembly's passage of a two-cent property tax for education. The tax was subject to voter approval, and Breckinridge worked hard to publicize the issue. His efforts paid off, as the tax passed by almost a two-to-one margin. Continuing to publicize needs and push legislators to action, Breckinridge enjoyed the support of five of the six governors under whom he served. Only John L. Helm, who opposed a state-funded school system, challenged him, but Helm's veto of a Breckinridge educational bill was overridden in the General Assembly. Breckinridge's reforms manifested tangible results. From 1847 to 1850, educational spending increased from $6,000 to $144,000. By 1850, only one out of every ten school age children did not attend school.

In 1850, Kentuckians ratified their third constitution. One of many changes effected by this document was that the office of superintendent became elective. Though the election belonged to the Democrats, Breckinridge, a Whig, was elected over five challengers for the office. His tenure would be a short one, however. Unlike his early reforms, his calls for parental selection of textbooks and use of the Bible as the primary reading material were not heeded. He also opposed the abolition of tuition charges and unsuccessfully lobbied for a pay increase for his position. (The salary was only $750.) With little prospect of further reform under his leadership, Breckinridge resigned in 1853.

Following his resignation, Breckinridge shifted his party affiliation from Whig to Know-Nothing to Republican. In 1853, he helped found Danville Theological Seminary in Danville, Kentucky, becoming a professor of Exegetic, Didactic, and Polemic Theology.

== Civil War and later life ==
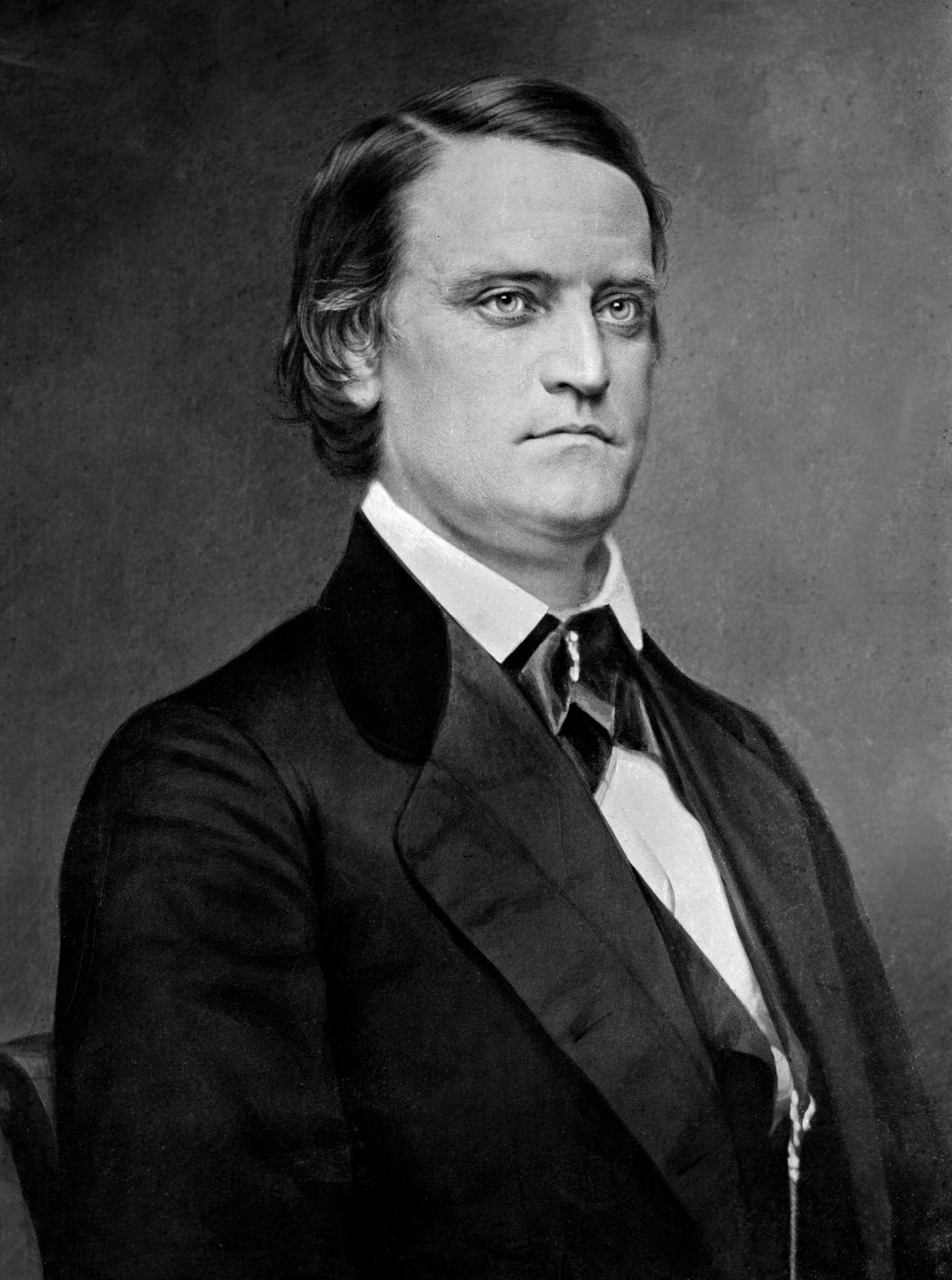
Robert Breckinridge supported Abraham Lincoln for president in 1860 over his nephew, John C. Breckinridge (pictured)

Although he owned a number of slaves, and his marriage to Virginia Shelby had left him with a good many more, Breckinridge had been a supporter of gradual emancipation and colonization of blacks since his early political career. As the sectional crisis worsened, this led him into several high-profile debates, notably with fellow Kentuckian Robert Wickliffe, the uncle of Robert C. Wickliffe. His support of Abraham Lincoln for president in the election of 1860 pitted him against his own nephew, Vice President John C. Breckinridge.

At the outbreak of the Civil War, Breckinridge quickly became an ardent supporter of the Union, not for its position against slavery, but for the sake of preserving the Union. He used his position as editor of the Danville Quarterly Review to advocate his position. He called for harsh measures against secession, and in time, accepted President Lincoln's immediate emancipation of slaves. He was chosen as the temporary chair of the 1864 Republican National Convention that re-nominated Lincoln for president, and his pro-Union speech was hailed by freshman Representative James G. Blaine as one of the most inspiring given at the event.

Breckinridge's family split on the issue, with two of his sons – Joseph and Charles – fighting for the Union cause, and two – Willie and Robert Jr. – fighting for the Confederacy. Following the war, Willie Breckinridge's wife Issa refused to let her father-in-law see two of his grandchildren for a period of two years.

In 1866, he was elected as a member to the American Philosophical Society.

On November 5, 1868, Breckinridge married his third wife, Margaret Faulkner White. A year later, he resigned his professorship at Danville Seminary. He died on December 27, 1871, after an extensive illness, and was buried in Lexington Cemetery.

== Legacy ==
In 1892, Breckinridge Hall (named for Breckinridge) was built as a dormitory for students of the Danville Theological Seminary. It is now a residence hall for upper-class students at Centre College in Danville - Breckinridge's nephew John C. Breckinridge's alma mater. Breckinridge Hall was renovated in 1999, and is on the National Register of Historic Places.

Breckinridge Hall, a three-story building on Morehead State University's campus, is named for Robert J. Breckinridge.

== Selected works ==
- The Knowledge of God, Objectively Considered: Being the First Part of Theology Considered as a Science of Positive Truth, Both Inductive and Deductive
- The Knowledge of God, Subjectively Considered: Being the Second Part of Theology Considered as a Science of Positive Truth, Both Inductive and Deductive
- Our country – its peril and its deliverance.
- Breckinridge's protest against the use of instrumental music in worship
- Presbyterian Government not a Hierarchy, but a Commonwealth
- Presbyterian Ordination not a Charm, but an Act of Government
- Some Thoughts on the Development of the Presbyterian Church in the U.S.A.
- The Christian Pastor, One of Christ's Ascension Gifts
- Letter of Robert J. Breckinridge to the Second Presbyterian Church of Baltimore
- Robert J. Breckinridge's speech at the laying of the cornerstone of the Clay Monument
- The Calling of the Church of Christ: A Discourse to Illustrate the Posture and Duty of the Presbyterian Church in the United States of America

== See also ==
- Breckinridge family in the American Civil War – American political/military family
- Kentucky in the American Civil War

== Footnotes ==
^[a]Klotter and Waugh list Second Presbyterian Church. Fish and Patton say First Presbyterian Church.

Academic offices
Preceded by Matthew Brown	President of Jefferson College; 1845–1847	Succeeded by Alexander Blaine Brown
Religious titles
Preceded by The Rev. William Morrison Engles	Moderator of the 53rd General Assembly of the Presbyterian Church in the United States of America (Old School); 1841–1842	Succeeded by The Rev. John Todd Edgar
