= Archibald Dixon =

American politician

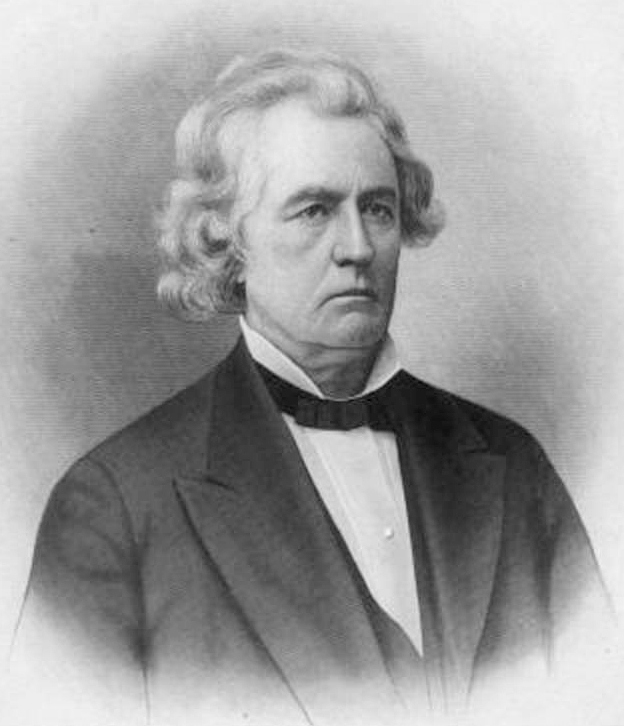

United States Senator from Kentucky
- In office September 1, 1852 – March 3, 1855
- Preceded by: David Meriwether
- Succeeded by: John J. Crittenden

13th Lieutenant Governor of Kentucky
- In office September 4, 1844 – September 6, 1848
- Governor: William Owsley
- Preceded by: Manlius Valerius Thomson
- Succeeded by: John L. Helm

Member of the Kentucky Senate
- In office 1836–1840

Member of the Kentucky House of Representatives
- In office 1830–1833, 1841–1843

Personal details
- Born: April 2, 1802 Caswell County, North Carolina, U.S.
- Died: April 23, 1876 (aged 74) Henderson, Kentucky, U.S.
- Resting place: Fernwood Cemetery, Henderson, Kentucky; 37.8231°N 87.59168°W
- Party: Whig
- Spouse(s): Elizabeth Robertson Cabell; Susan Peachy Bullitt
- Relations: Father-in-law of John Y. Brown
- Occupation: Lawyer
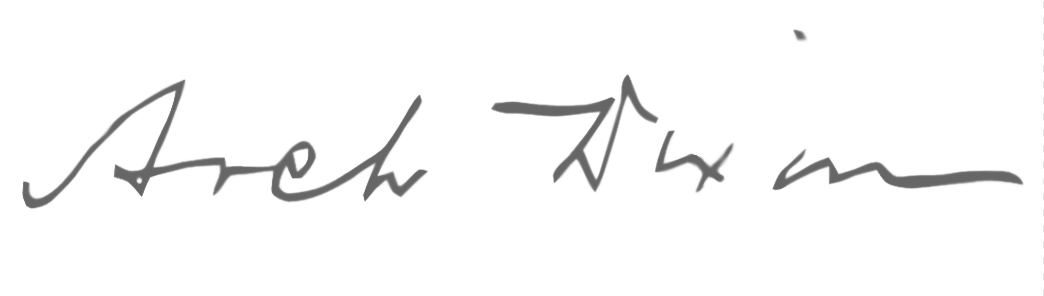
- Signature

Archibald Dixon (April 2, 1802 – April 23, 1876) was a U.S. Senator from Kentucky. He represented the Whig Party in both houses of the Kentucky General Assembly, and was elected the 13th lieutenant governor of Kentucky in 1844, serving under Governor William Owsley. In 1851, the Whigs nominated him for governor, but he lost to Lazarus W. Powell, his former law partner.

Dixon represented Henderson County at the Kentucky constitutional convention of 1849. In this capacity, he ensured that strong protections of slave property were included in the Kentucky Constitution of 1850. Later, the General Assembly chose Dixon to fill the unexpired Senate term of Henry Clay. He served from September 1, 1852, to March 3, 1855, and did not stand for re-election. During his short tenure, Dixon's major accomplishment was convincing Stephen Douglas to include language in the Kansas–Nebraska Act that explicitly repealed the Missouri Compromise's prohibition on slavery north of latitude 36°30'.

Despite his pro-slavery views, Dixon was loyal to the Union during the Civil War. He represented his county and his state in a number of failed conventions that sought to resolve the upcoming conflict before it began. In 1864, he joined Kentucky governor Thomas E. Bramlette in an audience with President Abraham Lincoln protesting the recruitment of former slaves as Union soldiers in Kentucky. Dixon died on April 23, 1876.

== Personal life ==
Archibald Dixon was born near Red House, Caswell County, North Carolina on April 2, 1802. He was the son of Captain Wynn and Rebecca Hart Dixon. Both Dixon's father and grandfather fought in the Revolutionary War, the former enlisting at the age of sixteen. His grandfather, Colonel Henry Dixon, was born in Kirkmichael, South Ayrshire in 1729 and emigrated to America as a child in 1739. He was commended by "Light Horse Harry" Lee for his service at the Battle of Camden. He was later killed at the Battle of Eutaw Springs. His paternal grandfather was born in Newtownards, Uster in 1734 and emigrated in 1751

In 1805, Captain Dixon lost all of his property and moved the family to Henderson, Kentucky. Archibald Dixon was educated by his mother and attended the common schools of Henderson. In 1822, he began to study law in the office of James Hillyer. He was admitted to the bar in 1824, and commenced practice in Henderson. He became well known as a skilled defense attorney and was employed in a number of cases in Kentucky and Indiana.

In 1834, Dixon married Elizabeth R. Cabell; the couple had six children.^{[a]} One of these was Rebecca Hart Dixon, second wife of future Kentucky governor John Y. Brown. Another daughter, Susan Bell Dixon, married Cuthbert Powell, a U.S. Representative from Virginia. One son, Henry, was elected a state senator in Kentucky, while another, Archibald, became a respected doctor in Henderson.

Elizabeth Cabell Dixon died in 1852. On October 29, 1853, Dixon married Susan Peachy Bullitt. Bullitt was the paternal granddaughter of Alexander Scott Bullitt, the first lieutenant governor of Kentucky, and the maternal granddaughter of Dr. Thomas Walker, the first surveyor in the state of Kentucky. Dixon and Bullitt had additional children.

== Political career ==
Dixon was elected to represent Henderson County in the Kentucky House of Representatives in 1830. He served three consecutive one-year terms, leaving the House in 1833. Following this, he returned to his law practice and in 1835, partnered with Lazarus W. Powell. From 1836 to 1840, he represented Henderson, Daviess, and Hopkins counties in the Kentucky Senate. The next year, he returned to the Kentucky House, serving from 1841 to 1843.

In 1844, Dixon was chosen as the Whig nominee for lieutenant governor on a ticket with William Owsley. Dixon defeated his opponent, William S. Pilcher, by more than 11,000 votes. At the expiration of his term, the Whig party considered nominating Dixon for governor, but instead chose the more experienced John J. Crittenden, who defeated Dixon's former law partner, Lazarus Powell.

The voters of Henderson County chose Dixon to represent them at the state constitutional convention of 1849. The Whigs nominated him to chair the convention, but he lost to the Democratic nominee James Guthrie by a vote of 50 to 43. A large slaveholder, Dixon introduced numerous measures to protect the rights of slaveholders in the new constitution. Among them were assertions that slave property was just as inviolable as any other property, that the rights of property were above constitutional sanction, and that absolute power over property cannot exist in a republic. Though some of these ideas were challenged, all eventually found their way into the Kentucky Constitution of 1850.

The Whigs nominated Dixon for governor in 1851. The Democrats countered with Lazarus Powell. Still friends from their earlier days as law partners, the two often traveled together during the campaign. Cassius Marcellus Clay also entered the contest, representing the emancipationist wing of the Whig Party. Clay drew about 6,000 votes, mostly from Whigs, and Powell won the election by a small majority.

=== In the Senate ===
On December 17, 1851, Henry Clay submitted a letter of resignation of his seat in the U.S. Senate, to be effective September 1 of the following year (1852). Clay's announcement came while the Kentucky General Assembly was in session. This was intentional. The majority of the Assembly was Whig, and Clay knew that if he resigned while the Assembly was in session, the majority would elect a Whig to be his successor. By contrast, if he had waited until September 1 to announce his resignation the Assembly would already have closed its session, and Governor Powell, a Democrat, would appoint a temporary successor until the legislature convened again two years later.

The Assembly acted according to Clay's plans. By a vote of 71–58, they chose Dixon over Democrat James Guthrie to assume Clay's seat effective September 1. However, Clay died on June 29, 1852. Because Dixon's commission stipulated an effective date of September 1, Governor Powell proceeded to name Clay's successor for the period until September 1. He chose Democrat David Meriwether, who served those two months, then, with respect to the original commission issued by the legislature (or by simply not returning to the Senate upon the commencement of the next session), effectively relinquished the seat to Dixon. After a lengthy Senate debate on the validity of his commission—it having been issued prior to Clay's death, with an effective date subsequent to the executive appointment of a successor—Dixon was sworn in on December 20, 1852. He served the remainder of Clay's term, but did not stand for reelection in 1854.

A major issue during Dixon's tenure in the Senate was the admission of the Nebraska Territory to the Union. Specifically, the question hinged upon the issue of whether or not slavery would be allowed in the state. Under the Missouri Compromise, slavery was prohibited in the territory. Because of this, the southern states opposed its admission. In an attempt to allay southern fears, Stephen Douglas introduced a bill in January 1854 that included a provision that "all questions pertaining to slavery in the territories, and in the new states to be formed therefrom are to be left to the people residing therein, through their appropriate representatives." Douglas hoped to placate southerners with this language, which allowed for the possibility of legalized slavery in the potential state without specifically addressing the issue of the Missouri Compromise.

Southerners, however, saw that Douglas' attempt was unlikely to result in legalization of slavery. While it allowed Nebraska to determine whether slavery would be legal there when it became a state, slavery was still forbidden under the Missouri Compromise as long as it remained a territory. If no slaveholders were allowed in the territory, it would be exceedingly unlikely that the state's voters would allow for slavery in their constitution. Following this line of thought, Dixon drafted an amendment to Douglas' bill that would repeal section eight of the Missouri Compromise, the section that prohibited slavery north of latitude 36°30'. After a promise of support from Tennessee senator James C. Jones, Dixon introduced the amendment on January 16, 1854. This forced Douglas to confront the Missouri Compromise issue outright, and two days later, he visited Dixon to discuss his position. Douglas was reluctant to repeal the Compromise, but was ultimately convinced by Dixon's logic. He concluded the interview by exclaiming "By God, Sir, you are right. I will incorporate it in my bill, though I know it will raise a hell of a storm." Over the next several days, Douglas incorporated Dixon's suggestion and other pro-slavery measures into the Kansas-Nebraska Act, which President Franklin Pierce signed into law on May 30, 1854.

== Later life ==
On June 1, 1852, the stockholders of the Henderson and Nashville Railroad met at Madisonville, Kentucky and elected Archibald Dixon as president of the company. He served until his resignation in spring 1853.

Despite his pro-slavery views, Dixon loyally supported the Union during the lead-up to the Civil War. His sons, however, had Confederate sympathies. Dixon's home county of Henderson was one of the first counties in Kentucky to express their feelings about the secession crisis. The county called an assembly at the county courthouse on November 10, 1860. Dixon was elected chair of the meeting, and immediately expressed a pro-Union sentiment. A committee of five was appointed to draft resolutions stating Henderson County's position. At a second meeting one week later – which Dixon also chaired – the committee reported their pro-Union resolutions, which were approved.

In an attempt to stave off the Civil War, Dixon participated in a convention of border states and a peace convention in Frankfort, Kentucky, both in 1861. Both conventions were unsuccessful. At the outset of the war, the Kentucky General Assembly elected six arbiters to recommend a course of action for the Commonwealth. Dixon represented the pro-Union position along with John J. Crittenden and Samuel S. Nicholas. Kentucky governor Beriah Magoffin, John C. Breckinridge, and Richard Hawes represented the southern sympathizers. The arbiters met on May 11, 1861. After the pro-Union men defeated a proposal to call a sovereignty convention, the six arbiters recommended a position of neutrality, which the General Assembly adopted.

In March 1864, Dixon accompanied Kentucky Governor Thomas E. Bramlette and John Marshall Harlan, the state's attorney general, to an audience with President Lincoln to protest the recruitment of blacks into the ranks of the Union Army. The governor eventually agreed to allow the practice, but only when whites failed to meet their draft quotas. Since recruitment of blacks had been taking place in the Commonwealth for more than two months already, the concession was little more than a face-saving gesture by Bramlette. Following the end of the Civil War, Dixon retired from public life. He died in Henderson on April 23, 1876, and is buried in Fernwood Cemetery in Henderson.

== Legacy ==
Archibald Dixon is the namesake of Dixon, Kentucky.

== Notes ==
^[a] Kleber, the more contemporary source, lists Dixon's first wife as Elizabeth Pollit, while Starling gives the name Elizabeth Robertson Cabell, a marriage date of 1832, and lists only five children. Genealogical records, including death certificates of Dixon's children, also give the first wife's name as Elizabeth R. Cabell, with a marriage date of March 13, 1834, in Henderson County, Kentucky.

Party political offices
Preceded by John J. Crittenden	Whig nominee for Governor of Kentucky; 1851	Succeeded by None
Political offices
Preceded by Manlius Valerius Thomson	Lieutenant Governor of Kentucky; 1844–1848	Succeeded by John L. Helm
U.S. Senate
Preceded by David Meriwether	U.S. senator (Class 3) from Kentucky; 1852–1855; Served alongside: Joseph R. Underwood, John B. Thompson	Succeeded by John J. Crittenden
