= David Meriwether (Kentucky politician) =

American politician and lawyer (1800–1893)

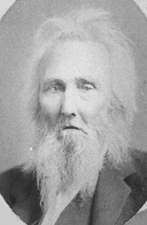

3rd Governor of New Mexico Territory
- In office May 6, 1853 – August 17, 1857
- Appointed by: Franklin Pierce
- Preceded by: William Carr Lane
- Succeeded by: Abraham Rencher

United States Senator from Kentucky
- In office July 6, 1852 – August 17, 1852
- Appointed by: Lazarus W. Powell
- Preceded by: Henry Clay
- Succeeded by: Archibald Dixon

33rd Secretary of State of Kentucky
- In office September 3, 1851 – July 5, 1852
- Governor: Lazarus W. Powell
- Preceded by: John William Finnell
- Succeeded by: James P. Metcalfe

Member of the Kentucky House of Representatives from Jefferson County
- In office August 4, 1879 – August 3, 1885
- Preceded by: Hancock Taylor
- Succeeded by: Joshua Fry Bullitt Jr.

Member of the Kentucky House of Representatives
- In office 1859–1861; 1832–1845

Personal details
- Born: October 30, 1800 Louisa County, Virginia, U.S.
- Died: April 4, 1893 (aged 92) Louisville, Kentucky, U.S.
- Resting place: Cave Hill Cemetery; Louisville, Kentucky, U.S.
- Party: Democratic

David Meriwether (October 30, 1800 – April 4, 1893) was a United States senator from Kentucky and as the governor of New Mexico Territory.

Born in Louisa County, Virginia, Meriwether moved with his parents to Jefferson County, Kentucky, in 1803. He attended the common schools and engaged in fur trading in 1818 near what is now Council Bluffs, Iowa. He later engaged in agricultural pursuits in Jefferson County.

Meriwether studied law, was admitted to the bar, and commenced practice. He was a member of the Kentucky House of Representatives from 1832 to 1845. He was an unsuccessful candidate for election in 1847 to the Thirtieth Congress. He was a delegate to the state constitutional convention in 1849, and was Secretary of State of Kentucky in 1851.

Meriwether was appointed as a Democrat to the United States Senate to fill the vacancy caused by the death of Henry Clay, and served from July 6, 1852, to August 31, 1852, when Archibald Dixon was elected his successor. He was not a candidate for renomination in 1852.

In 1853, Meriwether was appointed by President Franklin Pierce as Governor of the Territory of New Mexico after the position was turned down by Solon Borland, and continued in office to 1855. From April to July 1854, when Meriwether was out of state, the Secretary of the Territory, William S. Messervy, was acting Governor.

Meriwether later served again in the Kentucky House of Representatives from 1858 to 1885, and served as speaker in 1859. After this he retired to his plantation near Louisville, Kentucky.

He died on April 4, 1893, at the age of 92, and was interred in Cave Hill Cemetery.

Political offices
Preceded by John W. Finnell	Secretary of State of Kentucky; 1851–1852	Succeeded by James P. Metcalfe
Preceded by William Carr Lane	Governor of New Mexico Territory; 1853–1855	Succeeded by Abraham Rencher
U.S. Senate
Preceded by Henry Clay	U.S. senator (Class 3) from Kentucky; 1852; Served alongside: Joseph R. Underwood	Succeeded by Archibald Dixon
Honorary titles
Preceded by Simon Cameron	Oldest living U.S. senator June 26, 1889 – April 4, 1893	Succeeded by James W. Bradbury
