= John J. Crittenden =

U.S. Attorney General and politician from Kentucky (1787–1863)

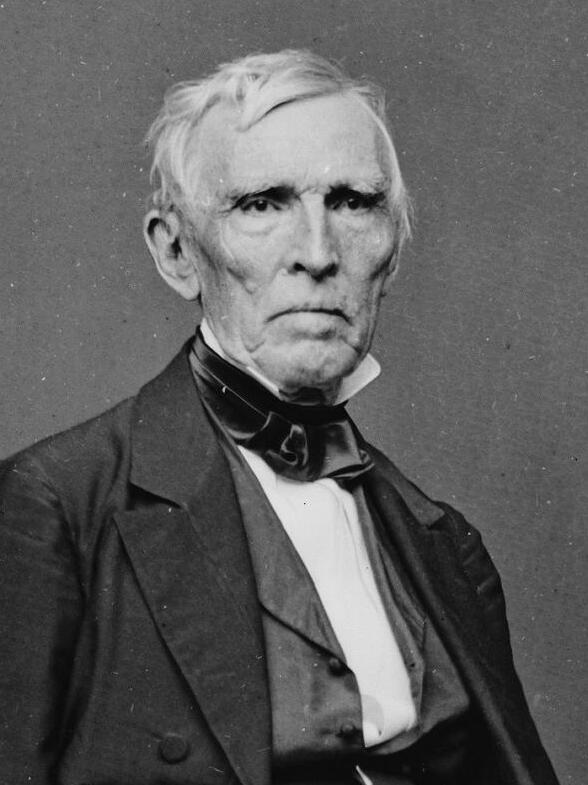
- Crittenden, c. 1860–1863

Member of the U.S. House of Representatives from Kentucky's 8th district
- In office March 4, 1861 – March 3, 1863
- Preceded by: William E. Simms
- Succeeded by: William H. Randall

United States Senator from Kentucky
- In office March 4, 1855 – March 3, 1861
- Preceded by: Archibald Dixon
- Succeeded by: John C. Breckinridge
- In office March 31, 1842 – June 12, 1848
- Preceded by: Henry Clay
- Succeeded by: Thomas Metcalfe
- In office March 4, 1835 – March 3, 1841
- Preceded by: George M. Bibb
- Succeeded by: James Turner Morehead
- In office March 4, 1817 – March 3, 1819
- Preceded by: Martin D. Hardin
- Succeeded by: Richard Mentor Johnson

15th and 22nd United States Attorney General
- In office July 22, 1850 – March 4, 1853
- President: Millard Fillmore
- Preceded by: Reverdy Johnson
- Succeeded by: Caleb Cushing
- In office March 5, 1841 – September 12, 1841
- President: William Henry Harrison; John Tyler
- Preceded by: Henry D. Gilpin
- Succeeded by: Hugh S. Legaré

17th Governor of Kentucky
- In office September 6, 1848 – July 31, 1850
- Lieutenant: John L. Helm
- Preceded by: William Owsley
- Succeeded by: John L. Helm

22nd Secretary of State of Kentucky
- In office April 1834 – February 4, 1835
- Governor: James Turner Morehead
- Preceded by: Lewis Sanders Jr.
- Succeeded by: William Owsley

11th Speaker of the Kentucky House of Representatives
- In office 1815–1817
- Preceded by: William T. Barry
- Succeeded by: Cabell Breckinridge

Member of the Kentucky House of Representatives
- In office 1811–1817
- Constituency: Logan County

Attorney General of the Illinois Territory
- In office 1809–1810
- Nominated by: Governor Ninian Edwards

Personal details
- Born: John Jordan Crittenden; September 10, 1787 Versailles, Virginia (now part of Kentucky), U.S.
- Died: July 26, 1863 (aged 75) Frankfort, Kentucky, U.S.
- Resting place: Frankfort Cemetery
- Party: Democratic-Republican (before 1825); National Republican (1825–1830); Whig (1830–1856); American (1856–1859); Constitutional Union (1859–1861); Union Democratic (1861–1863)
- Spouse(s): Sarah Lee (m. 1811; died 1824) Maria Knox Todd (m. 1826; died 1851) Elizabeth Moss (m. 1853)
- Education: Washington and Lee University; College of William & Mary (BA)

Military service
- Allegiance: United States
- Branch/service: Kentucky Militia
- Years of service: 1812-1815
- Battles/wars: War of 1812; Battle of the Thames

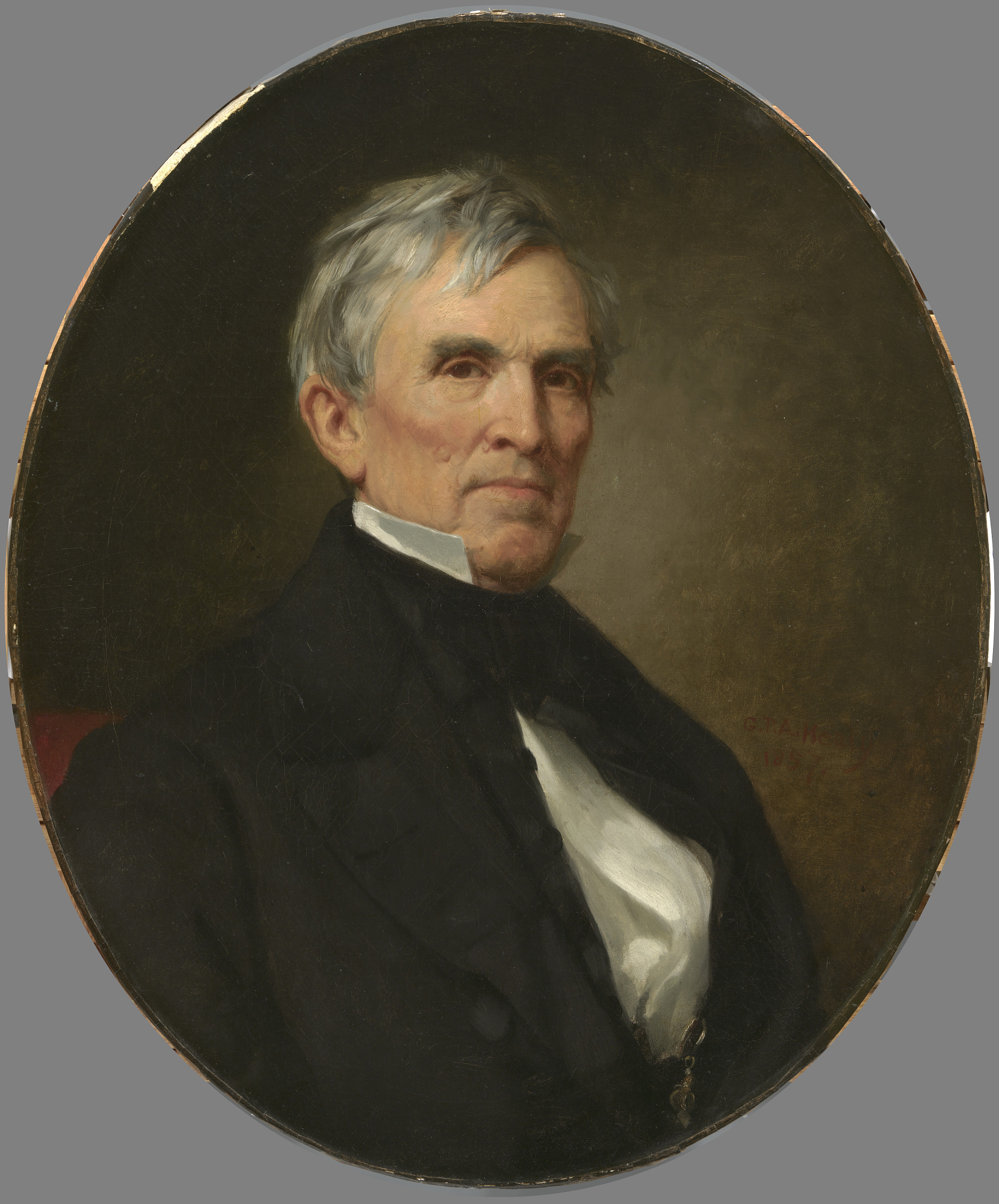
Crittenden, portrait by G. P. A. Healy, 1857

John Jordan Crittenden (September 10, 1787 – July 26, 1863) was an American statesman and politician from the U.S. state of Kentucky. He represented the state in the U.S. House of Representatives and the U.S. Senate and twice served as United States Attorney General in the administrations of William Henry Harrison, John Tyler, and Millard Fillmore. He was also the 17th governor of Kentucky and served in the state legislature. Although frequently mentioned as a potential candidate for the U.S. presidency, he never consented to run for the office.

During his early political career, Crittenden served in the Kentucky House of Representatives and was chosen as speaker on several occasions. With the advent of the Second Party System, he allied with the National Republican Party before joining the Whig Party, and was a fervent supporter of, and eventually a protege of Henry Clay and opponent of Democrats Andrew Jackson and Martin Van Buren.

Lame duck president John Quincy Adams nominated Crittenden to the U.S. Supreme Court on December 17, 1828, but senators who supported president-elect Jackson voted to postpone confirmation until Jackson could nominate his own man. After his brief service as Kentucky secretary of state, the state legislature elected Crittenden to the second of his four non-consecutive stints in the U.S. Senate. Upon his election as president, William Henry Harrison appointed Crittenden as Attorney General, but five months after Harrison's death, political differences prompted him to resign rather than continue his service under Harrison's successor, John Tyler.

He was returned to the Senate in 1842, serving until 1848, when he resigned to run for governor, hoping his election would help Zachary Taylor win Kentucky's vote in the 1848 presidential election. Taylor was elected, but Crittenden refused a post in his cabinet, fearing he would be charged with making a "corrupt bargain", as Clay had been in 1825. Following Taylor's death in 1850, Crittenden resigned the governorship and accepted Millard Fillmore's appointment as attorney general.

As the Whig Party crumbled in the mid-1850s, Crittenden joined the Know Nothing (or American) Party. After the expiration of his term as attorney general, he was again elected to the U.S. Senate, where he urged compromise on the issue of slavery to prevent the breakup of the United States. As bitter partisanship increased the threat of secession, Crittenden sought out moderates from all parties and formed the Constitutional Union Party, though he refused the party's nomination for president in the 1860 election. In December 1860, he authored the Crittenden Compromise, a series of resolutions and constitutional amendments he hoped would avert the Civil War, but Congress would not approve them.

== Early and family life ==
John Jordan Crittenden was born September 10, 1787, near Versailles, Kentucky. He was the second child and first son of Revolutionary War veteran Major John Crittenden and his wife Judith Harris. John and Judith Crittenden had four sons and five daughters; all but one survived infancy. On his father's side, he was of Welsh ancestry, while his mother's family was French Huguenot. His father had surveyed land in Kentucky with George Rogers Clark, and settled there just after the end of the American Revolution. Two of Crittenden's brothers, Thomas and Robert, became lawyers, while the third, Henry, was a farmer.

Crittenden began a college preparatory curriculum at Pisgah Academy in Woodford County. He was then sent to a boarding school in Jessamine County. Among his classmates were Thomas Alexander Marshall and Francis P. Blair. Crittenden became especially close friends with Blair, and later political differences did little to diminish their friendship. After a year at boarding school, Crittenden moved to the Lexington, Kentucky, home of Judge George M. Bibb to study law. He began more advanced studies at Washington College (now Washington and Lee University) in Lexington, Virginia. During his brief tenure there, he studied mathematics and belles-lettres and became friends with Hugh Lawson White. Dissatisfied with the curriculum at Washington College, Crittendon moved to Williamsburg and transferred to the College of William and Mary. He studied law under St. George Tucker and became acquainted with future president John Tyler.

== Career ==
Completing his studies in 1806, Crittenden was admitted to the bar the following year. He began his practice in Woodford County, but found central Kentucky already well supplied with able lawyers. Crittenden then moved to Logan County, Kentucky, on the then western frontier and opened his practice in Russellville. At age twenty-two, he moved across the Ohio River to Illinois Territory, and Governor Ninian Edwards appointed him Attorney General of the Illinois Territory from 1809 until 1810. The following year, Edwards also made Crittenden his aide-de-camp.^{[a]}

In addition to his legal practice when he returned to Kentucky, Crittenden also operated plantations and owned enslaved people. In 1830, his household included 12 free white persons and 6 enslaved people. In 1850, Crittenden owned 44 enslaved people (11 women above age 16, 7 men, 13 boys and 13 girls). In 1860, after distributing some property to his now-adult children, Crittenden owned ten enslaved people, all mulattos (females aged 60, 25, 21, 18 and 16 and males aged 28, 16, 14, 10 and 1).

== Early political career ==
Crittenden's career as an elected official began in the Kentucky House of Representatives, where he represented Logan County from 1811 to 1817. After the 1811 legislative session, he volunteered as an aide to General Samuel Hopkins in an expedition against the Indians. On the outbreak of the War of 1812, Kentucky governor Charles Scott appointed him as an aide-de-camp for the First Kentucky Militia. In 1813, he became an aide-de-camp to Governor Isaac Shelby, serving at the Battle of the Thames in Canada. Following the war, the governor issued him a special commendation for faithfulness in carrying out his orders. He then resumed his law practice in Russellville.

In 1814, Governor Shelby appointed Crittenden to fill the U.S. Senate seat vacated by his former teacher, George M. Bibb; later, however, Shelby learned that Crittenden was only twenty-seven years old, three years shy of the constitutional age requirement for senators. Hence he returned to his seat in the Kentucky House, where he was elected speaker over John Rowan. He would retain the position from 1815 to 1817.

As speaker, Crittenden presided over a particularly tumultuous time in the legislature. In October 1816, recently elected governor George Madison died. He was succeeded by Lieutenant Governor Gabriel Slaughter. Slaughter immediately made two extremely unpopular appointments, and quickly fell out of favor with many Kentuckians. A group of legislators, led by John C. Breckinridge, pointed out that the Kentucky Constitution provided only that the lieutenant governor would serve as governor until a new gubernatorial election was held and a qualified successor was chosen. Slaughter, they claimed, was only the "acting governor". The group presented a bill to the House that called for new elections. The bill was defeated, but Crittenden supported it.

Crittenden's support of a new election was both popular and politically expedient. When the U.S. Senate term of Martin D. Hardin, one of Slaughter's unpopular nominees, expired in 1817, the Kentucky General Assembly chose Crittenden to fill the vacancy. Though he was the youngest member of the body, he served as the second-ever chairman of the newly created Committee on the Judiciary. He was also a member of the Committee on Naval Affairs. During his term, he introduced legislation to reimburse and indemnify persons who were fined under the 1798 Sedition Act. He found state politics more interesting, however, and this fact, coupled with increased financial responsibilities incurred by the birth of his third and fourth children, prompted his decision to resign his seat on March 3, 1819.

=== Legislative interim ===
After leaving Congress, Crittenden moved to Frankfort, the state capital, to attract more legal clients and be nearer to the center of the state's political activity. Among his clients after moving to Frankfort were former presidents Madison and Monroe, future vice-president Richard Mentor Johnson, and future governors James T. Morehead, John Breathitt, and Robert P. Letcher. During this period, he collaborated with Henry Clay in defending Charles Wickliffe, son of Robert C. Wickliffe. Wickliffe was charged with the murder of the editor of the Kentucky Gazette. Crittenden argued that the slaying was self-defense, and Clay delivered a passionate closing argument. The jury returned a verdict of "not guilty" only minutes after the case was submitted to them.

In January 1820, Crittenden and John Rowan were chosen to help resolve Kentucky's boundary dispute with Tennessee. The boundary was supposed to run along the line at 36 degrees, 30 minutes north latitude, but when Thomas Walker surveyed it, he erroneously marked the line farther north. Crittenden and Rowan proposed either that the "Walker Line" remain the boundary from the Cumberland Mountains to the Tennessee River and Tennessee would compensate for the error west of the Tennessee River, or that the boundary be reset at 36 degrees, 30 minutes throughout. Tennessee's commissioners rejected both proposals, asking instead that the Walker Line be accepted east of the Tennessee River and a more southerly line west of it, with reciprocal agreements between the states to honor existing land grants. Crittenden was inclined to accept the offer, but Rowan was not. The Kentucky commissioners proposed that the matter be submitted to arbitration, but Tennessee refused. In a report to the General Assembly, Crittenden recommended that Kentucky accept the Tennessee proposal. The legislators were swayed by Crittenden's report, and the articles of agreement were signed on February 2, 1820.

Crittenden was elected to the board of trustees for Transylvania University in 1823, possibly due to lobbying by Henry Clay. A year later, the faculty of the university awarded him an honorary doctor of laws. Crittenden also served as a trustee and attorney for the Kentucky Seminary in Frankfort. Crittenden used his influence in support of Clay in the 1824 presidential election until Clay was eliminated from contention. He then threw his support to Andrew Jackson until he learned that John Quincy Adams, if elected, would likely make Clay Secretary of State. Critics termed Adams' alleged promise to Clay the "corrupt bargain", but it resulted in Adams' election. Upon his appointment as Secretary of State, Clay was prepared to recommend Crittenden to replace him as chief counsel in Kentucky for the Second Bank of the United States, but the bank chose not to hire a replacement.

=== Old Court – New Court controversy ===
Crittenden was drawn back into public service by the Old Court – New Court controversy. When legislation aimed at providing relief to the state's debtors was struck down by the Kentucky Court of Appeals, supporters of the legislation in the General Assembly passed a bill abolishing the Court and creating a new court, which they stocked with sympathetic justices. Opponents of the legislation held that the Assembly's action was unconstitutional, and for a time both courts claimed authority as the court of last resort in the state. Though he had served as president of the New Court-backed Bank of the Commonwealth since its formation in 1820, Crittenden publicly identified himself with the Old Court supporters in April 1825. In the legislative election of 1825, friends called on Crittenden to seek election to the state House of Representatives. Many believed that he was the only Old Court supporter that commanded enough respect to win one of the two seats allotted to Franklin County, a bastion of the New Court. When Crittenden consented to run, New Court supporters nominated the state's Attorney General Solomon P. Sharp and Lewis Sanders, a prominent lawyer. Crittenden and Sharp were elected to the two seats.

In the early hours of the morning of November 7, 1825, the very morning the legislature was to convene, Sharp was assassinated. Charges were made that Old Court supporters had instigated the murder. Crittenden tried to blunt these charges by introducing a resolution condemning Sharp's murder and offering $3,000 for the murderer's capture. When assassin Jereboam O. Beauchamp was apprehended, it became clear that the motivation for the killing was personal, not political. (Beauchamp's wife had married him on the condition that he kill Sharp, who had refused to claim the child he had fathered with her previously.) Despite this, Crittenden refused a request to represent Beauchamp in his murder trial because he wanted to avoid any implication in the matter.

The court controversy dominated the legislative session. Crittenden joined the Old Court majority in the House in passing a measure to abolish the New Court. The bill was killed in the Senate, however, by the tie-breaking vote of Lieutenant Governor Robert B. McAfee. Crittenden later served on a committee of six to resolve the conflict, but to no avail. He was unwilling to accept a solution whereby all the justices resigned from both courts, and the governor would appoint a reorganized court made up equally of Old Court and New Court supporters. This position cost him the support of some New Court partisans that had voted for him in the previous election, and he was not returned to the House in 1826. Ultimately, Old Court partisans gained control of both houses of the legislature, and the New Court was abolished permanently in December 1826.

== Association with the National Republicans ==
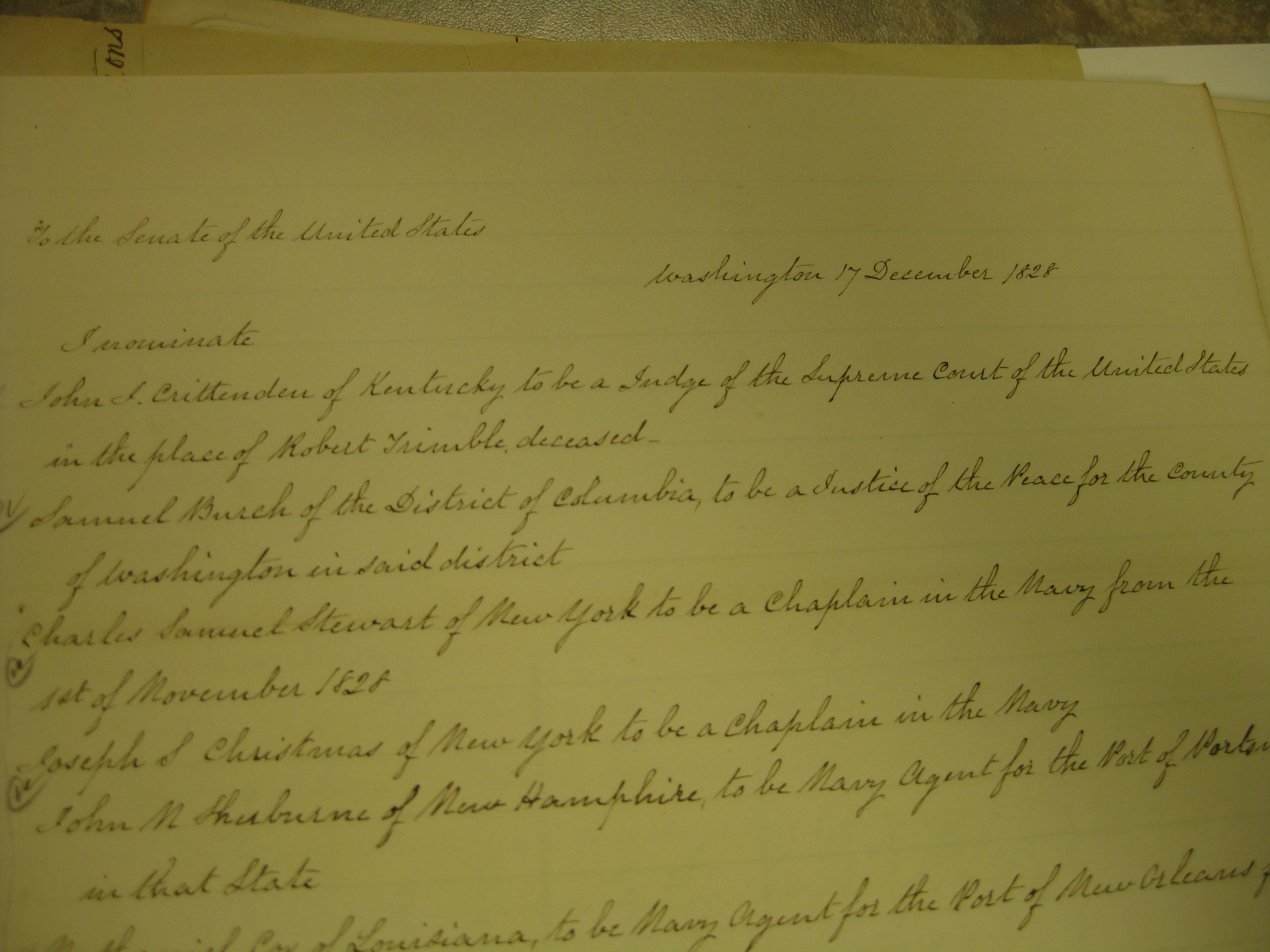
Crittenden's Supreme Court nomination

As a result of the Old Court – New Court controversy, Kentucky's politicians became divided between the Democrats and the National Republicans. Crittenden's alliance with Henry Clay and his own personal political views put him squarely in the National Republican Party. Because of Crittenden's support of his presidential bid, President Adams appointed him United States district attorney for the district of Kentucky in 1827. In 1828, Adams nominated him to replace Kentuckian Robert Trimble as an associate justice of the Supreme Court, but Jackson supporters in the Senate refused to confirm him. When Jackson defeated Adams in the 1828 presidential election, he removed Crittenden from his post as district attorney because of his association with Clay and his opposition to Jackson's financial policies.

Crittenden supporters sought to make him the National Republican nominee for governor in the election of 1828. Though his nomination was all but certain, Crittenden declined the opportunity, fearing that his association with Clay, who was losing popularity in the state, would cost his party the election. Instead, he threw his support behind Thomas Metcalfe, who went on to carry a very close election over Democrat William T. Barry. Crittenden instead sought another term in the Kentucky House, but was again denied the seat.

In 1829, Crittenden was elected to the Kentucky House via a special election. He served as Speaker of the House for his entire term. In 1830, he was the Whig nominee to replace John Rowan in the Senate. Secretly, the party wished to nominate Henry Clay, giving him a springboard from which to launch another presidential campaign, but it was unknown whether he would be able to secure enough votes for confirmation; it was decided that Crittenden would be the nominee, and if the voting favored the Whigs by a large enough margin, Crittenden would withdraw and allow them to confirm Clay instead. The Democrats countered successively with Richard Mentor Johnson, John Rowan, Charles A. Wickliffe, and John Breathitt. None of them polled more than sixty-four of the sixty-nine votes needed for confirmation. Crittenden garnered sixty-eight votes on fourteen different ballots, but he refused to vote for himself because he wanted Clay to be the nominee. Some of Crittenden's supporters, however, refused to vote for Clay, and the seat was left vacant.

The following year, a clear majority of the House of Representatives were pledged to Crittenden for the open Senate seat. However, Clay allies pressured Crittenden to step aside and allow Clay to be the Whig nominee. Crittenden obliged, and Clay was elected by a margin of nine votes over Richard M. Johnson. Crittenden went on to manage both the unsuccessful gubernatorial campaign of Richard Aylett Buckner and the campaign to help Clay win Kentucky in the 1832 presidential election. After Clay's defeat in 1832, he offered to resign his Senate seat and allow Crittenden to succeed him, but Crittenden refused the offer. Later that year, Crittenden retired from the General Assembly.

== Association with the Whigs ==
External videos
- "Senator Mitch McConnell on John Jordan Crittenden", presentation at Eastern Kentucky University, March 26, 2013, C-SPAN

Crittenden was active in organizing the Whig Party from the remnants of the defunct National Republican Party in 1834. On July 4, 1834, he called to order the party's first organizational meeting in the state at Cove Spring on the outskirts of Frankfort. He was chosen as chair of the committee on resolutions and in a speech on July 5, bitterly condemned President Jackson. Later in 1834, Kentucky governor James T. Morehead appointed Crittenden Secretary of State. In the August elections, Whigs won a majority in both houses of the General Assembly. When the Assembly convened, they elected Crittenden to the U.S. Senate over Democrat James Guthrie by a vote of 94–40.

Immediately upon taking his seat in the Senate, Crittenden was named to the Committee on Public Lands and the Committee on the Judiciary, probably due to Clay's influence. Early in his term, Crittenden vociferously opposed Senator Thomas H. Benton's proposal to spend the federal budget surplus on public land graduation and military fortifications along the eastern seaboard. He also blasted the Jackson administration for issuing the Specie Circular, requiring that all payment for government land be made in gold or silver. He pointed out that the principles of the circular had been presented in a resolution on the Senate floor, but had been tabled by a large majority. Crittenden maintained that the tabling of the resolution was a condemnation by the Senate, yet the administration issued the circular only months later, overstepping, as Crittenden saw it, the bounds of the executive branch's authority. Crittenden debated the issue at length with Senator Benton, and Congress ultimately passed a bill requiring the government to accept the notes of specie-paying banks for the purchase of government lands, but President Jackson employed his pocket veto to prevent it from becoming law.

During his term, Crittenden remained an outspoken critic of Jackson and his successor, Martin Van Buren. He supported Henry Clay's plan for distributing proceeds from the sale of public lands among the states, and also joined Clay in opposing the administration-backed Second Seminole War. One of the few administration proposals he supported was the recognition of the new Republic of Texas. During this period of Crittenden's service in the Senate, the issue of slavery rose to prominence. Crittenden was regarded as a moderate on the issue, seeking to keep it out of politics altogether. In 1836, he resisted petitions by the Quakers to abolish slavery in Washington, D.C., but he also opposed radical pro-slavery measures such as John C. Calhoun's proposal to ban abolitionist literature from being delivered by mail in the Southern states.

In contrast to his usually conciliatory nature, Crittenden was drawn into a disagreement between congressmen Jonathan Cilley and William J. Graves that ended in a duel. On the floor of the House, Cilley had attacked the integrity of Whig newspaper editor James Watson Webb. Webb demanded a retraction of Cilley's comments through his friend, Congressman Graves. When Cilley refused to receive the communication from Graves, Graves charged that Cilley was questioning Webb's honor and challenged him to a duel. Graves, accompanied by Kentucky congressman Richard Menefee and Virginia congressman Richard Wise asked Crittenden to serve as a second for Graves in the duel; Crittenden initially protested, but finally agreed. After two misses by both combatants, Cilley was killed on the third exchange. The House proposed the expulsion of Graves and the censure of the other participants (excluding Crittenden, who was a senator and not subject to House censure). The resolutions of expulsion and censure were eventually tabled, but Crittenden personally felt the sting of what he considered an indirect censure and later regretted his actions.

=== Harrison and Tyler administrations ===
In the 1840 presidential election, Crittenden again encouraged Kentucky Whigs to support the nomination of Henry Clay. During the balloting at the party's 1839 convention, candidates Clay and General Winfield Scott played cards with Crittenden and Whig politician George Evans at the Astor House hotel in New York City. When the group received word of William Henry Harrison's victory, Clay blamed his loss on Scott and struck him, with the blow landing on the shoulder which had been wounded during Scott's participation in the Battle of Lundy's Lane. Afterwards Clay had to be physically removed from the hotel room. Scott then sent Crittenden to Clay with Scott's challenge for a duel, but Crittenden reconciled them by convincing Clay to apologize.

After Clay lost the nomination, Crittenden supported Harrison. Crittenden was re-elected to the Senate in 1840 even though he was widely expected to be named to a position in Harrison's cabinet. He was apparently given his choice of positions, and selected Attorney General. He resigned his Senate seat to take this post.

As attorney general, Crittenden issued only one notable opinion. The plaintiff in the case was an individual whose property had been damaged during Andrew Jackson's invasion of what would become the Florida Territory in 1818. The case was still being adjudicated in 1841. A Florida court found in favor of the plaintiff and ordered the federal government to compensate him for the damages and to pay him interest on his claim from the time the damages were incurred. Treasury Secretary Thomas Ewing asked Crittenden whether the court had the authority to award interest and whether or not it should be paid. Crittenden opined that it did not, and Ewing did not pay the interest. Crittenden's opinion was used as a precedent in similar cases by future attorneys general.

Only a week after being appointed by Harrison, Crittenden was dispatched to New York City to mediate tensions with Great Britain over the sinking of the steamboat Caroline by a group of Canadian militia, who were attempting to suppress a rebellion in Canada. In this diplomatic endeavor, Crittenden was acting separately from his official duties as attorney general. He spoke with New York governor William H. Seward and secured his promise to pardon Alexander McLeod, who had seized and burned the Caroline, if he were convicted of a crime in New York. Ultimately, McLeod was acquitted.

Shortly after the Caroline affair, President Harrison died and Vice-president John Tyler ascended to the presidency. Tyler resisted Clay's attempts to set the Whig agenda, and vetoed two bank bills against Crittenden's advice. Crittenden and the other Whigs in Tyler's cabinet—excepting Daniel Webster—resigned in protest of Tyler's deviation from the traditional Whig agenda. Crittenden's resignation was effective September 11, 1841. He returned to Kentucky with no political office and very little money. A group of his friends in Woodford County purchased his boyhood home and presented it to him as a gift on his return to Kentucky.

Crittenden was appointed to the United States Senate in 1842, filling the vacancy caused by Clay's resignation. In January 1843, he was elected to a full term over Richard Mentor Johnson. The Whigs' feud with President Tyler continued unabated, and some even talked of impeaching him, but Crittenden condemned that course of action. During the 27th and 28th Congresses, he served on the Committee on Military Affairs. He was an advocate of moderate protective tariffs and federal internal improvements. He opposed giving states the option to forgo apportionment, which would have allowed them to elect their congressmen at-large.

=== Polk administration ===
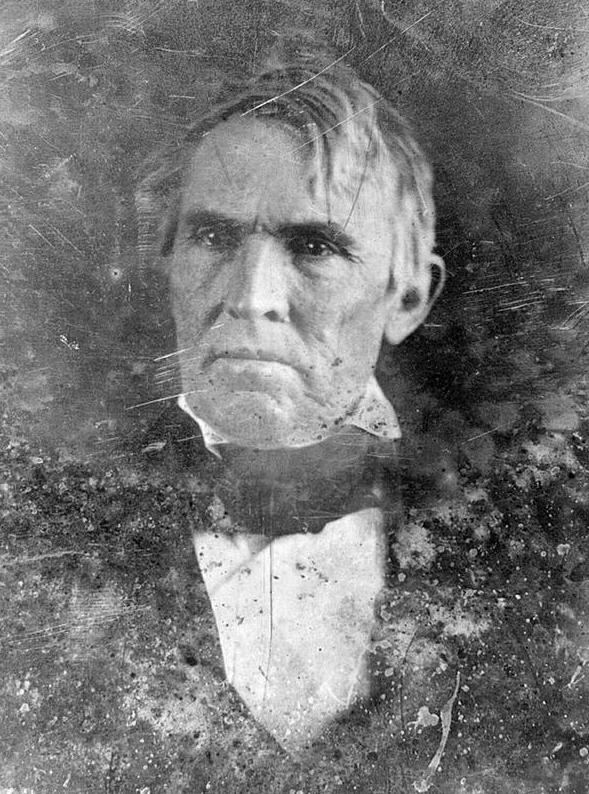
Daguerreotype of Crittenden by Mathew Brady, c. 1846

Crittenden again supported Clay's presidential bid in 1844. Clay was widely considered the favorite not only for the Whig nomination, but to win the general election. None of the traditional campaign issues—Tyler's "executive usurpation", Clay's "corrupt bargain" with John Quincy Adams, or the protective tariff—seemed to excite the electorate. However, the issue of the annexation of Texas changed the entire campaign. Clay made a tour of the South just before the Whig nominating convention and concluded that the sentiment in favor of annexation in that part of the country was not as strong as had been assumed in Washington, D.C. Acting on this belief, and against Crittenden's advice, Clay sent a letter opposing annexation to Crittenden, asking him to have it published in the National Intelligencer.

Clay believed the Democrats would again nominate Martin Van Buren, who was ardently opposed to annexation, and this would keep annexation from becoming an issue in the campaign. Clay was nominated by acclamation at the Whig convention in Baltimore a week later. At the Democratic nominating convention a month later, however, Van Buren was unable to secure his party's nomination, and the Democrats instead nominated James K. Polk, who strongly favored annexation. Clay tried to moderate his views on annexation, but his changes of position drew opposition from supporters of both sides of the issue as he attempted to find a middle ground. Polk went on to win the election in a close race. This was the last time Clay would be nominated for president, and many Whigs believed that, following Clay's defeat, Crittenden was the new leader of their party.

In 1845, the Senate took up the question of ending the joint occupancy of the Oregon Territory with Great Britain. Lewis Cass, a senator from Michigan, supported an immediate termination of the joint occupation agreement and maintained that a war with the British over the matter was inevitable. Crittenden disagreed, and insisted that Britain be given two years notice before the joint occupation of the territory was ended in order to allow time for a diplomatic resolution. Ultimately, Crittenden's position prevailed, and a compromise with Britain was effected, setting the dividing line between the two nations' claims at the 49th parallel north.

In 1846, the United States entered the Mexican–American War in an attempt to gain control of Texas. Crittenden did not support the war, and after war was declared, he insisted that commissioners accompany the U.S. armies and attempt to broker peace at every opportunity. Throughout the war, he corresponded regularly with Generals Zachary Taylor and Winfield Scott. Crittenden's sons, George and Thomas, both served in the war; Thomas Crittenden served on Scott's staff. President Polk consulted Crittenden regarding the terms of peace that should be accepted to end the war. Crittenden insisted that the terms of peace should not include the acquisition of territory to which the United States did not have a "just claim", but the Treaty of Guadalupe Hidalgo submitted to Congress in 1848 called for Mexico to give up its claims not only to Texas, but also to New Mexico, California, and all the territory in between. A few Whigs joined the Democratic majority in Congress to ratify the treaty and defeat the Wilmot Proviso, which would have banned slavery in the newly acquired territory.

Friends encouraged Crittenden to run for president in the 1848 election. A Nashville newspaper declared its support for him as early as 1846. A Democratic senator from Rhode Island opined that Crittenden could win support from a sizable number of Democrats in addition to the support of his own party. George B. Kinkead desired to have the Kentucky General Assembly nominate Crittenden for president in 1847. None of these overtures swayed Crittenden. "For Heaven's sake don't talk to me about the Presidency", he said, rebuffing one early offer. Clay hoped Crittenden would again support him, but Crittenden concluded that Clay was no longer a viable candidate and threw his support behind Kentuckian Zachary Taylor. This decision caused a rift between the two friends, and they were not reconciled until years later when Clay lay on his deathbed.

=== Campaigns of 1848 ===
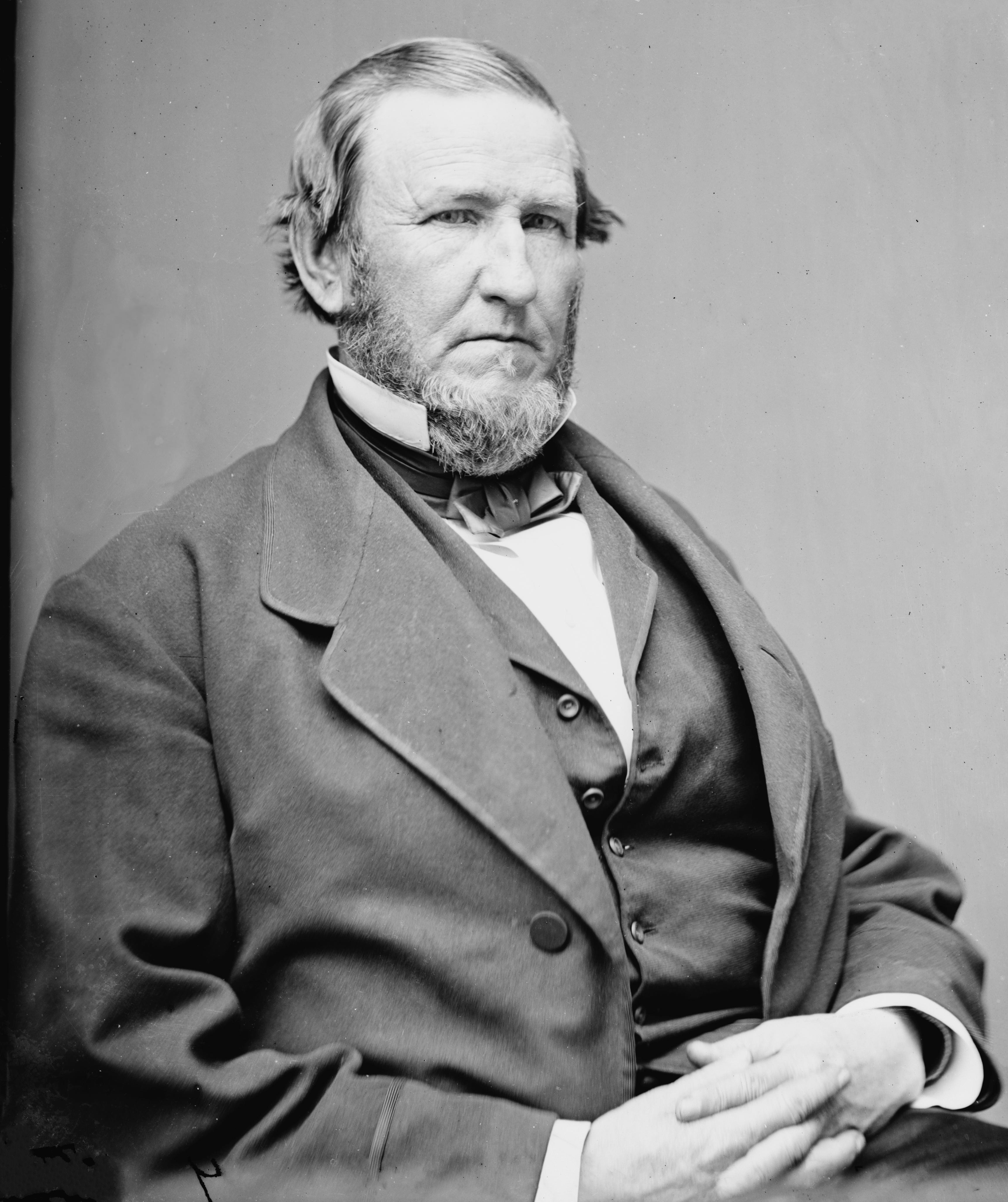
Lazarus W. Powell was Crittenden's opponent in the 1848 gubernatorial election.

The Whig Party was also divided in Kentucky, not only between Clay and Taylor, but between gubernatorial candidates. William J. Graves, out of politics since his fatal shooting of Representative Cilley, had the backing of sitting Whig governor William Owsley, while Archibald Dixon had secured support from former Whig governor Robert P. Letcher. Letcher wrote to Crittenden that a Whig split and Democratic victory in the gubernatorial election would have an injurious effect on Whig hopes of carrying Kentucky in the 1848 presidential election; another former Whig governor, Thomas Metcalfe, concurred. At the Whig nominating convention, both Graves and Dixon withdrew their names and a delegate from Logan County put forward Crittenden's name without his consent. The nomination easily carried before Crittenden's friends could block it. The governorship was less prestigious and paid less than Crittenden's position in the Senate. He would also have to abandon his growing legal practice before the Supreme Court and would lose input on national issues of importance to him such as the territorial questions that grew out of the Mexican War. Nevertheless, he believed that his candidacy would unite the Whigs and help Taylor win Kentucky's electoral votes in the general election. He accepted the nomination a week after it was made.

Elijah Hise, Chief Justice of the Kentucky Court of Appeals, was the leading candidate for the Democratic gubernatorial nomination, but after the Whig nomination of Crittenden, Hise withdrew from consideration. The Democratic state convention then nominated Congressman Linn Boyd, but Boyd also declined the nomination. The Democrats were finally able to nominate Henderson lawyer Lazarus W. Powell. As Crittenden canvassed the state, his opponents charged him with disloyalty to Clay because he refused to support him in the 1848 election. Crittenden maintained that he supported Clay for the presidency over anyone else, but he had believed that Clay did not intend to seek the Whig nomination in 1848. After Clay announced his candidacy, Crittenden said, he remained neutral in the Whigs' choice. In the gubernatorial election, Crittenden defeated Powell by a vote of 65,860 to 57,397. He resigned his Senate seat to assume the governorship.

With his own campaign at a close, Crittenden resumed direction of Taylor's presidential campaign, dispatching accomplished Whig speakers to all parts of the country. After Taylor was elected, he offered Crittenden the post of Secretary of State. Appeals came in from both Whig and Democratic leaders across the country urging him to serve in the cabinet; Taylor was inexperienced, and many felt that without Crittenden to guide him, his administration would fail. Taylor personally visited Crittenden in Frankfort on February 15, 1849, in hopes of persuading him to accept the appointment. Crittenden refused Taylor's overtures, and Taylor similarly rejected Crittenden's appeals to appoint his friend, Robert P. Letcher, as Postmaster General. Crittenden's input is believed to have contributed significantly to the appointments of John M. Clayton as Secretary of State and Orlando Brown as Commissioner of Indian Affairs.

Crittenden's reasons for refusing Taylor's appointment were many. Partially, he declined out of respect for Clay's feelings and partially he felt it would be viewed in the same way as Clay and Adams' "corrupt bargain" in 1825. Resigning the governorship also would have amounted to admitting to the Democrats' charges that he only sought the office to help Taylor win the presidency. Finally, he had not been able to fully heal the breach in the Whig Party, and he wanted to remedy that situation.

=== Gubernatorial administration ===
During Crittenden's term, he gave strong support to superintendent of public education, Robert Jefferson Breckinridge, who would come to be known as the "Father of public school system in Kentucky." In response to Crittenden's call for financial support for the improvement of public education, the General Assembly passed a common school law on February 26, 1849. This law established guidelines for several public officials regarding their administration of the common schools. The Assembly also reserved tolls collected on the Kentucky, Green, and Barren rivers for education, and passed a two percent property tax to fund the state's schools.

Crittenden ordered the refurbishing of the state penitentiary, which had been damaged by a fire, and called for an extensive state geological survey. He also advised the creation of a sinking fund to retire the state's debt. The state adopted a new constitution during Crittenden's term, though Crittenden was not a delegate to the constitutional convention and apparently had little influence on the drafting of the document. Most Whigs opposed the calling of a constitutional convention because it would necessarily involve reapportionment of the state's legislative districts and threaten Whig dominance in the General Assembly; nevertheless, Crittenden belatedly supported the call for a convention during his 1848 gubernatorial campaign.

With the question of slavery becoming even more critical following the territorial acquisitions of the Mexican–American War, John C. Calhoun delivered an inflammatory address in December 1848 urging leaders of the southern states to resist "Northern aggression", even if it meant secession from the Union. Crittenden strongly denounced secession in his annual messages to the legislature in 1848 and 1849. In response, the state senate passed a resolution calling on Kentucky's citizens to cherish the Union and resist any efforts to secede.

=== Second term as attorney general ===
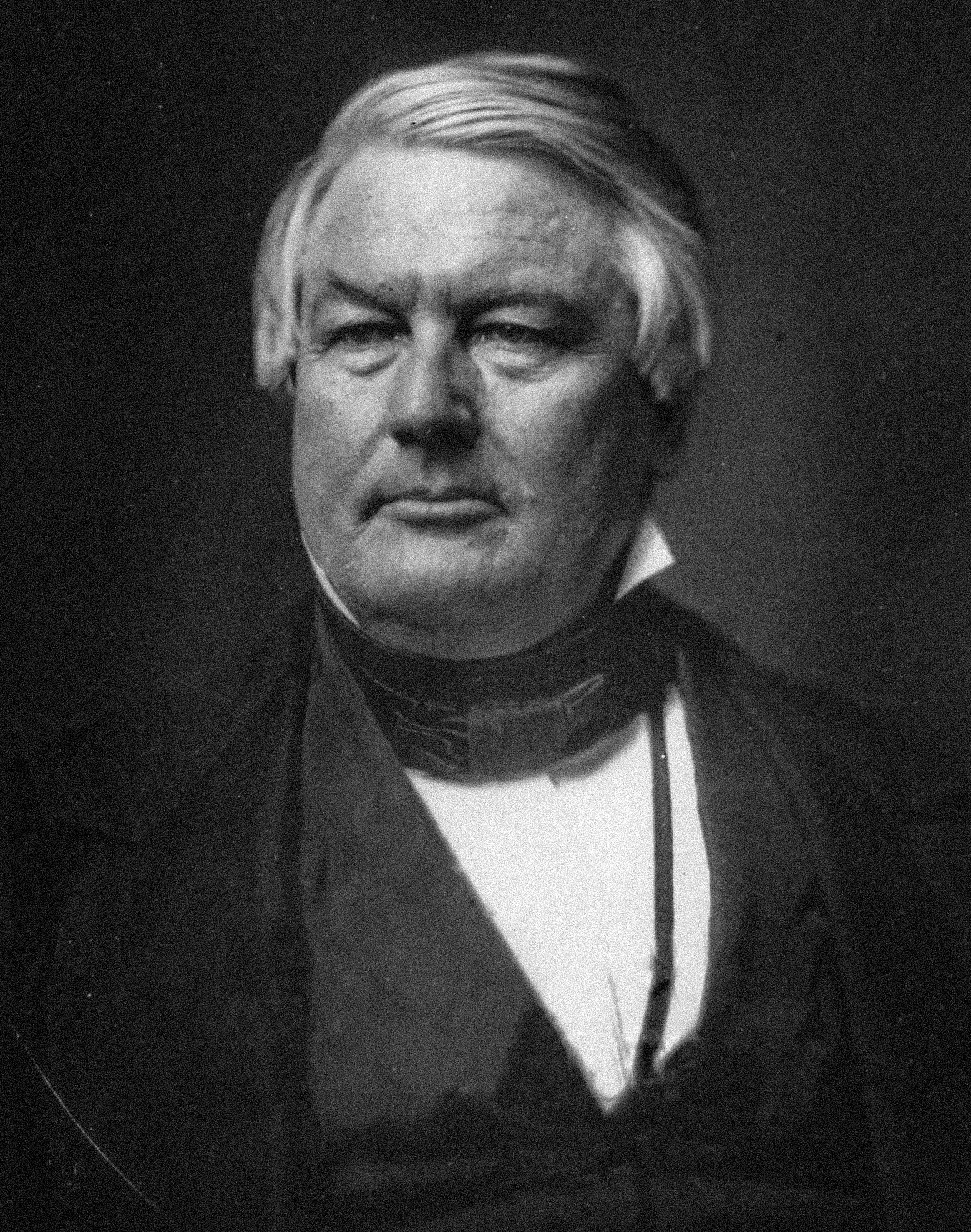
President Millard Fillmore appointed Crittenden to his second term as U.S. attorney general.

Vice President Millard Fillmore ascended to the presidency upon Taylor's death and offered Crittenden the post of Attorney General. Believing the rift in the Whig Party was now much improved, he accepted the offer and resigned the governorship in 1850. Fillmore, an opponent of slavery, requested an opinion from Crittenden on the constitutionality of the fugitive slave law, one of the bills involved in the Compromise of 1850. Specifically, he asked if the law suspended the writ of habeas corpus. Crittenden said that it did not, opining that it discharged a duty placed on Congress by the Constitution to return runaway slaves. Crittenden's opinion was probably motivated by a desire to see the Compromise pass and avert further sectional tension. Fillmore, his misgivings assuaged, signed the bill, keeping the Compromise intact.

Questions regarding claims in Florida, some already considered by Crittenden during his first term as attorney general, continued during his second term. Specifically, some of the claimants objected to a legal provision, passed by Congress years after the Adams–Onís Treaty, that allowed the secretary of the treasury to refuse to pay claims awarded by Florida courts that he found not to be "just and equitable". The claimants contended that this allowed an executive officer to overrule a judicial decision in violation of the doctrine of separation of powers. Crittenden held that the secretary's ruling was just as much a judicial action as that of the Florida judges. Further, he reiterated his 1841 decision that no interest could be paid on claims arising from damages resulting from Jackson's invasion. Despite this opinion, a Florida judge awarded interest to one of the claimants, and the government appealed the case to the Supreme Court, with Crittenden serving as the government's counsel. The Court upheld Crittenden's entire opinion in its ruling.

Crittenden was awarded an honorary Doctor of Laws degree from Harvard University in 1851. Later that year, he acted as Secretary of State during the illness of Daniel Webster. In this capacity, he wrote a vigorous warning to both Britain and France about interfering in the question of Cuban independence. He also encouraged adherence to the United States' traditional policy of non-interference in Europe during the celebrated visit of Hungarian revolutionary Louis Kossuth to the United States in 1851.

In November 1851, the General Assembly convened to elect a successor to Senator Joseph R. Underwood. Underwood, whose term would expire in 1853, desired re-election, and Whigs Charles S. Morehead and George Robertson had also announced their respective candidacies. Crittenden, whose term as attorney general also expired in 1853, had publicly announced that he wished to return to the Senate after his service in President Fillmore's cabinet, and upon learning this, Underwood and Morehead both withdrew from the race. Robertson was not expected to seriously challenge Crittenden, but following the withdrawals of the other candidates, Archibald Dixon entered the race. Historically an ally of Crittenden, Dixon's entrance into the race after Crittenden's announcement showed that he had switched his allegiance from Crittenden to Clay. Democrats, desirous to defeat Crittenden and embarrass the Whigs, pledged to vote against him at all costs, even if it meant electing Dixon. Crittenden's friends, therefore, held back his name from nomination to spare him almost certain defeat. Balloting deadlocked for several days, with Clay supporters throwing their support to Dixon, Robertson, and Lieutenant Governor John B. Thompson, a compromise candidate. Another compromise was proposed whereby Clay, his health failing, would resign his Senate seat, creating two Senate vacancies and allowing both Dixon and Crittenden to be elected, but Clay refused to cooperate. Finally, on the night of December 11, 1851, the Whigs met in caucus and agreed to withdraw both Dixon and Crittenden and elect Thompson.

A week after the election, Clay resigned, but Crittenden now declined the appointment to fill his unexpired term. Instead, the legislature elected Dixon to the remainder of Clay's term, set to expire in March 1855. Three weeks before Clay's death in 1852, he sent for Crittenden, and the two were reconciled; Crittenden delivered a eulogy for Clay in September 1852, publicly dispelling the feud. After Clay's death, Crittenden became the most prominent Whig leader in Kentucky. He encouraged the party to support the nomination of Millard Fillmore for the presidency in 1852, but the nomination ultimately went to Winfield Scott. Crittenden was proposed as the nominee for vice-president, but he declined. Democrats captured the governorship that year; this was harbinger of the demise of the Whig Party in Kentucky.

=== Return to the Senate ===
Crittenden served as attorney general until the expiration of Fillmore's term in 1853. Following his service as attorney general, he returned to private life. He made a substantial amount of money establishing mining claims for his clients in the former Mexican territory.

In 1853, the legislature was to elect a successor to Senator Dixon. Now satisfied that the feud between Clay and Crittenden had ended, Dixon did not seek re-election, leaving Crittenden with no Whig opposition. On a joint vote of the two houses of the General Assembly, Crittenden was elected 78–59 over governor Lazarus Powell.

In the period between his election and his taking office, Crittenden was the lead defense counsel in the murder trial of Matt F. Ward, the son of one of Crittenden's lifelong friends. Ward's younger brother had been disciplined by the principal at Louisville Male High School the preceding November, and the elder Ward went to argue with the principal on behalf of his brother. In the ensuing encounter, Ward shot and killed the principal with a pistol. Public sentiment was heavily against Ward, and the trial was moved to Hardin County. During the week-long trial, which began in April 1854, Crittenden emphasized inconsistencies in the accounts of eyewitnesses and called prominent character witnesses such as Louisville mayor James Stephens Speed, Congressman William Preston, and Courier-Journal editor George D. Prentice. He presented a case that Ward had acted in self-defense. Because the prosecution sought the death penalty, Crittenden asserted that if the jury rendered an erroneous conviction, they would have no peace of mind knowing they had sentenced an innocent man to hang.

There was a tremendous public outcry when Ward was found not guilty. Newspapers across the nation condemned the verdict and Crittenden for his role in securing it. Only Prentice, in the Courier-Journal, defended Crittenden and the Ward family. Several public meetings passed resolutions calling for Crittenden's resignation from the Senate. After one such meeting, a mob gathered and Crittenden, Prentice, the Wards, and the twelve jurors were burned in effigy.

When he assumed his Senate seat in 1855, Crittenden was sixty-nine years old, the eldest member of that body. The Whig Party had practically dissolved by this time, and he joined many of his fellow Kentuckians in associating with the Know Nothing Party. Although he did not agree with all the party's principles, he would not associate with the Democrats, the party he had spent much of his career denouncing, nor would he associate with the new Republican Party because of their stance against slavery. Despite his misgivings about some of the party platform, he campaigned on behalf of Millard Fillmore, the party's candidate in the 1856 presidential election.

Crittenden was present on May 22, 1856, when Congressman Preston Brooks attacked Senator Charles Sumner with a cane on the floor of the Senate. During the attack, Brooks's allies from the House, Laurence M. Keitt and Henry A. Edmundson, prevented witnesses from coming to Sumner's aid. Crittenden attempted to intervene, and pleaded with Brooks not to kill Sumner. Senator Robert Toombs then had to intercede for Crittenden, telling Keitt that it would be wrong to attack someone who was not a party to the Brooks-Sumner dispute, though Toombs also indicated later that he had no issue with Brooks beating Sumner, and in fact approved of it.

In the early part of his term, Crittenden was concerned with quelling the violence in Kansas Territory. An opponent of the Kansas–Nebraska Act of 1854, Crittenden also opposed repealing the Missouri Compromise unless the North agreed to substitute popular sovereignty for the exclusion of slavery north of the 36°30' line. In early 1856, he proposed sending General Winfield Scott to the Kansas Territory to ensure that fair elections were held there, but the proposal was blocked by the Pierce administration. He did not agree with all of the act proposed by Toombs to allow for a constitutional convention in Kansas Territory, but he supported it as a step to bring peace there. He regarded the ratifications of both the Topeka Constitution and the Lecompton Constitution as invalid, and made one of the most highly regarded speeches of his career in opposition to the latter. His substitute bill that would have resubmitted the Lecompton Constitution to Kansas for another ratification vote was supported by Republicans, but it was ultimately defeated. So great was Crittenden's influence after his actions on the Kansas question that Abraham Lincoln felt that Crittenden's endorsement of Stephen Douglas cost Lincoln the Illinois senatorial election in 1858.

== Civil War ==
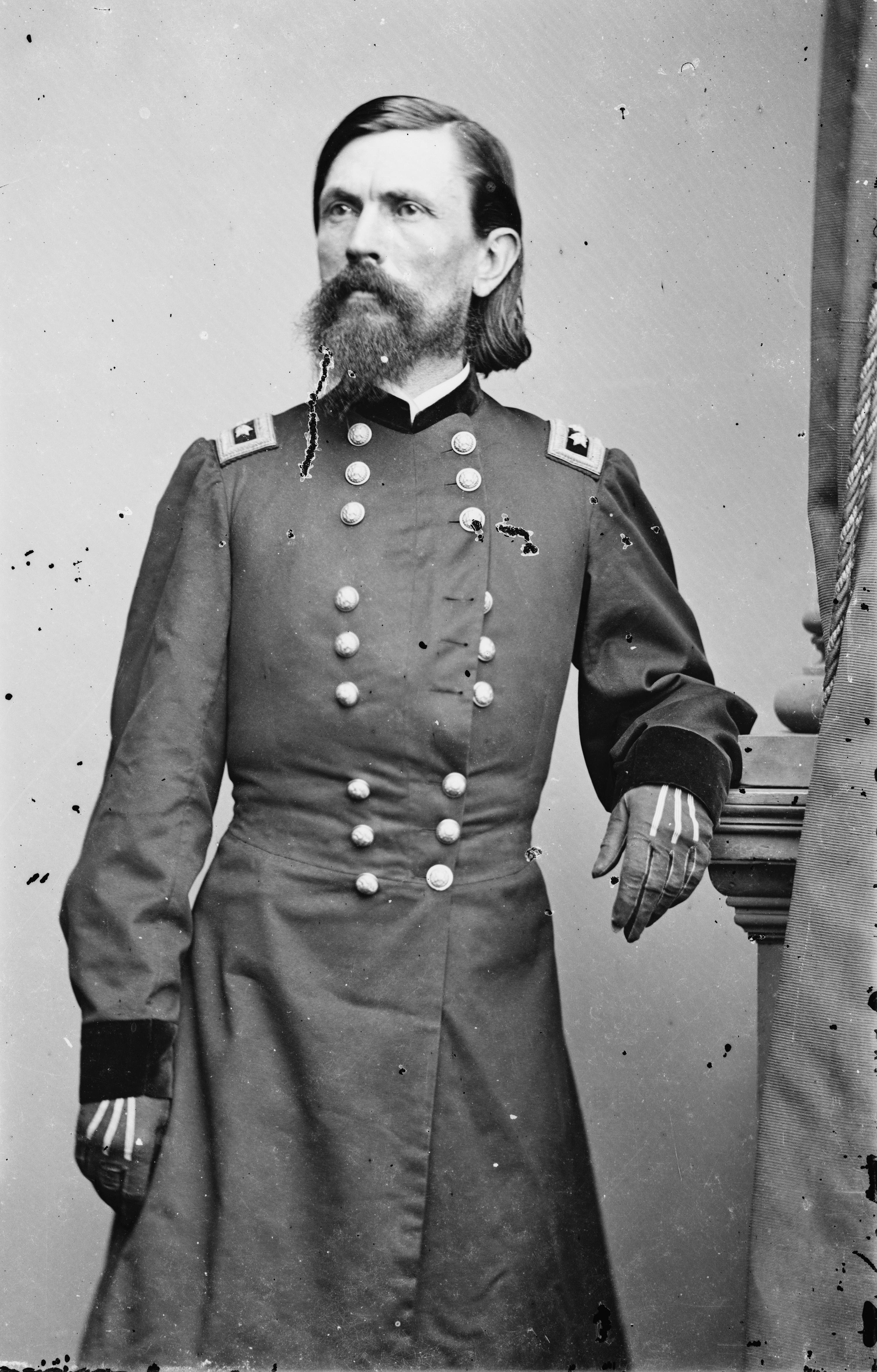
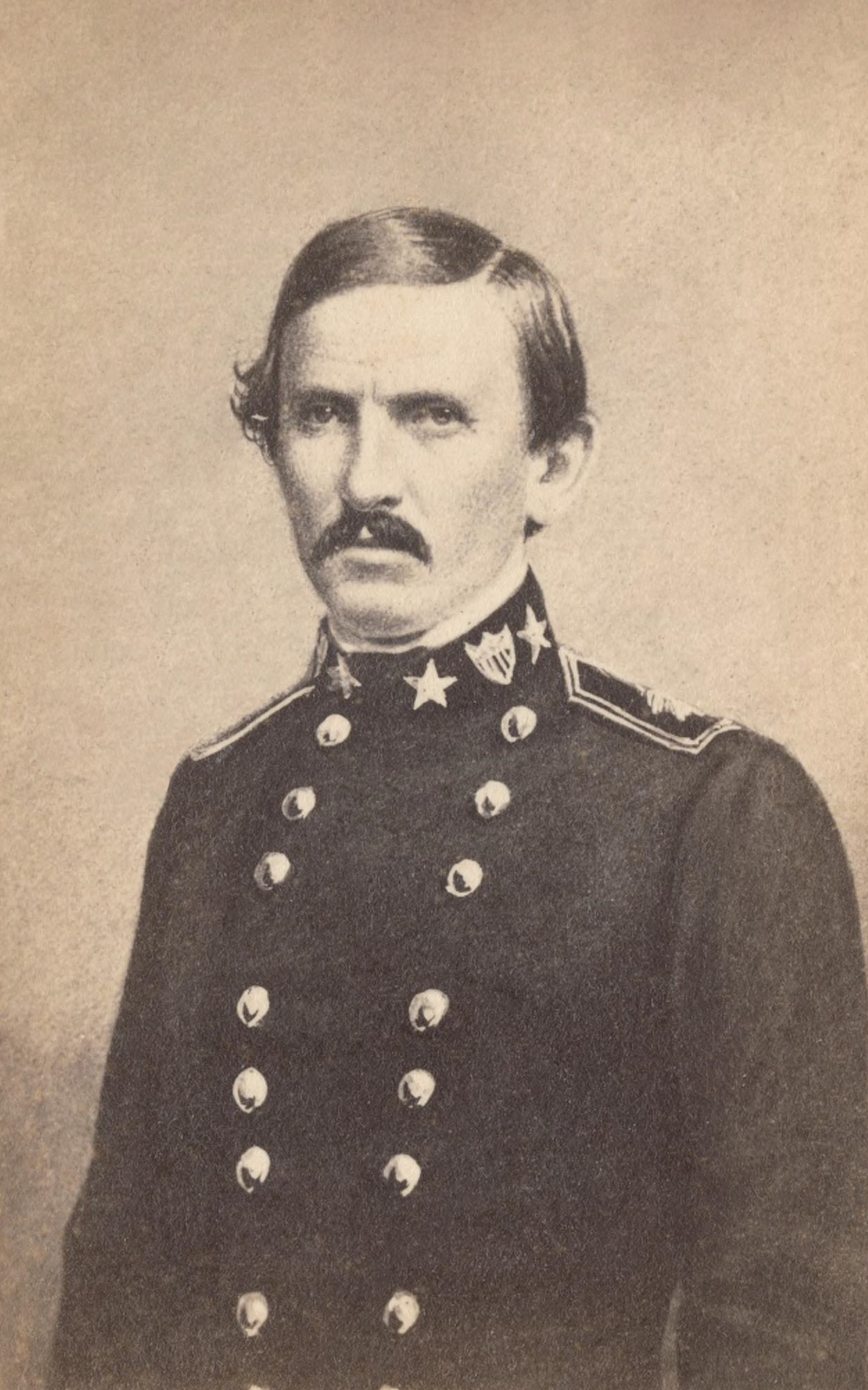
Crittenden's son Thomas (above) fought for the Union, but another son George (below), fought for the Confederacy.

From 1858 to 1860, Crittenden sought out moderates from all sections of the country to effect compromise on the territorial and slavery issues, thus averting war. In 1860, he was named chair of the National Union Executive Committee, a group of congressmen and journalists who feared that sectional differences would destroy the Union. His efforts helped form the Constitutional Union Party later that year. Chosen as the keynote speaker at the party's national convention on May 9, 1860, many urged him to become their nominee for president. At age seventy-three, however, Crittenden was already contemplating retirement and instead orchestrated the nomination of John Bell, whom he actively supported in the 1860 presidential race.

Even after the election of Abraham Lincoln as president in 1860, Crittenden rejected the idea that secession was inevitable and continued to work for the preservation of the Union. He believed that the current sectional crisis could—like all past disagreements in U.S. history—be resolved through compromise. However, he believed that this compromise must not be a simple legislative action, which could be altered or even repealed by a successive Congress, but amendments to the U.S. Constitution, which would be much more difficult to change. To that end, he proposed the Crittenden Compromise—a package of six constitutional amendments and four congressional resolutions—in December 1860. Among the resolutions were a condemnation of Northern personal liberty laws and an assertion of the constitutionality of the fugitive slave law. The amendments would have restored the Missouri Compromise line and extended it to California as a line of demarcation between slave and free territories. Crittenden's other amendments would have further guaranteed that slavery would remain legal indefinitely in Washington, D.C., so long as it was legal in either Maryland or Virginia and that slaveholders would be reimbursed for runaway slaves. Also, the amendments denied Congress any power to interfere with the interstate slave trade or with slavery in the existing Southern states and made the fugitive slave law and Three-Fifths Compromise perpetual in duration.

The compromise proposal was referred to a special committee proposed by Crittenden's fellow Kentucky senator, Lazarus Powell. Though it was believed that Republicans in general, including their representatives on the committee, were disposed to accept Crittenden's compromise or one substantially similar to it, President-elect Lincoln had already instructed his trusted allies in the legislature to resist any plan to extend slavery into the territories. Consequently, when the committee held its first meeting, the Republican members blocked Crittenden's plan and six others from coming to the floor for a vote. Despite their opposition, however, the Republicans presented no alternative plan. After the rejection of Crittenden's plan in committee, Florida, Mississippi, Alabama, and Georgia followed South Carolina's lead and passed ordinances of secession.

On January 3, 1861, Crittenden tried to salvage his plan by recommending to the full Senate that it be submitted to the people in referendum. It was widely believed that a referendum would recommend adoption of Crittenden's plan, and Republicans in Congress used a variety of procedures to prevent a vote on allowing it. On January 16, with procedural delays exhausted, New Hampshire Senator Daniel Clark moved to substitute for Crittenden's plan a resolution stating that constitutional amendments were unnecessary to preserve the Union, and that enforcement of the Constitution and the present laws would eliminate the need for special sectional guarantees. With the senators from southern states (both those that had seceded and those that had not) refusing to vote, Republicans were left with a majority in the chamber and passed Clark's substitute resolution, effectively killing Crittenden's proposal.

Crittenden remained in Washington for a few weeks after Congress adjourned. Having learned that John Archibald Campbell, an Alabamian serving on the Supreme Court, had decided to resign in light of his state's secession, President Lincoln proposed to appoint Crittenden to the vacant seat. Lincoln's cabinet approved, and the nomination papers were drafted, but Campbell belatedly reconsidered his resignation, and by the time he definitely determined to resign, Lincoln had changed his mind regarding Crittenden's nomination.

Having failed to secure compromise at the federal level, Crittenden returned to Kentucky in early 1861, attempting to persuade his home state to reject the overtures of fellow southern states and remain in the Union. On May 10, 1861, a conference was held to decide Kentucky's course in the war. Crittenden joined Archibald Dixon and S. S. Nicholas as Unionist representatives at the conference; the Southern Rights position was represented by John C. Breckinridge, Governor Beriah Magoffin, and Richard Hawes. The conference failed to produce a united course of action, but adopted the policy of armed neutrality. Unionists in the legislature, however, feared that the state militia and its commander Simon Bolivar Buckner, had Confederate sympathies. To counter any threat that the militia would seize control of the state for the South, the General Assembly organized the Home Guard, a separate militia controlled by a five-man, pro-Union commission. Crittenden enlisted in the Home Guard as a private and was part of a group styled the "Union Defense Committee" that secured weapons for the Home Guard from the federal government.

In April, the General Assembly called a border states convention to be held in Frankfort in May. Slates of delegates were nominated by both the Unionists and the Southern Rightists, but war broke out before the election of delegates; the Southern Rights delegates withdrew from the election, and the Unionist slate, including Crittenden, was chosen by default. On May 27, 1861, Crittenden was chosen chair of the convention and called it to order. With war having largely precluded any good the meeting could have accomplished, only nine of Kentucky's twelve delegates were present, along with four from Missouri (out of seven elected), and one from Tennessee (and his election was questionable); Virginia, Maryland, and Delaware sent no delegates. Ultimately, the convention accomplished little beyond calling on the southern states to reconsider their secession and on the northern states to moderate their demands.

Against his father's wishes, Crittenden's son George resigned his position as a lieutenant colonel in the U.S. Army to join the Confederate States Army (in which he was promoted to brigadier and then to major general), only to effectively lose his career in the early Confederate defeat at Mill Springs, Kentucky. George's brother, Thomas Leonidas Crittenden, had been a member of Buckner's State Guard, but joined the Union Army in September 1861 and was advanced to the rank of brigadier general, serving under Don Carlos Buell. Another son, Eugene, also served in the Union Army and attained the rank of colonel. One of John Crittenden's grandsons, John Crittenden Coleman, enlisted with the Confederate Army, while another grandson, John Crittenden Watson, graduated from the U.S. Naval Academy and participated in Union Rear Admiral David Farragut's capture of New Orleans during the war.

=== Service in the House of Representatives and death ===
President Lincoln called a special session of Congress to convene July 4, 1861, and Kentucky held special elections in June to select congressmen for the special session. Crittenden had expressed his desire to retire from public service and initially refused pleas to become a candidate, but he finally consented to run in late May. He was elected over secessionist candidate William E. Simms; in all, nine of Kentucky's ten congressional districts selected Unionist candidates in the special election. Upon taking his seat, he was assigned to the Committee on Foreign Affairs. On July 10, 1861, he accompanied Simon B. Buckner on a visit to President Lincoln to secure a renewed commitment from Lincoln to respect Kentucky's neutrality; Lincoln agreed only to issue a declaration that he had no present designs on Kentucky but would not commit to restrict his future actions. In order to calm the fears of border state citizens concerned about the Union's objectives in the war, he introduced the Crittenden–Johnson Resolution, which blamed the secessionist states for the war and stated that the object of the war was not the subjugation of those states, but the defense of the Constitution and the preservation of the Union. When those ends were achieved, the resolution stated, the war should cease. Kentucky Representative Henry C. Burnett asked that the question be divided. Burnett was one of only two votes against the portion of the resolution blaming the Southern states for the war; the only dissent on the remaining portion came from Wisconsin's John F. Potter and Ohio's Albert G. Riddle. In the Senate, the resolution passed 30–5, with Kentucky senators Breckinridge and Powell voting in the minority. In December 1861 the House refused, by a vote of 76–65, to reaffirm the resolution.

After Congress adjourned in late July 1861, Crittenden returned home to Frankfort, but presently had to flee the city as Confederate generals Braxton Bragg and Edmund Kirby Smith invaded Kentucky, capturing both Frankfort and Lexington. He took up temporary residence at Louisville's Galt House hotel and was still residing there when Union General William "Bull" Nelson was killed by Brigadier General Jefferson C. Davis there in 1862. He returned to his home in Frankfort shortly after the Battle of Perryville drove the Confederates from the state on October 8, 1862. Returning for the regular congressional session, he became the conduit through which many reports of unconstitutional military arrests in Kentucky were channeled. He spoke against the admission of West Virginia to the Union on the grounds that Virginia had not consented to the creation of the state from its territory. He also opposed the Emancipation Proclamation and the use of slaves as soldiers in the war.

When he returned to Kentucky following the 37th Congress, Crittenden's health was failing, and he frequently complained of shortness of breath and chest pain. He had determined to retire from Congress, but once again, friends persuaded him to stand for re-election. Shortly after his nomination, Crittenden and his wife were en route to an alum spring in Indiana to seek treatment to alleviate the symptoms of his failing health when he collapsed in Louisville. After remaining bedfast at the home of a local doctor, he returned home to Frankfort, where he died on July 26, 1863. He was interred at the State Cemetery in Frankfort. Among his other notable kinsmen were nephews Thomas Theodore Crittenden, congressman from Missouri, and Thomas Turpin Crittenden, a general in the Union Army.

== Marriages and children ==
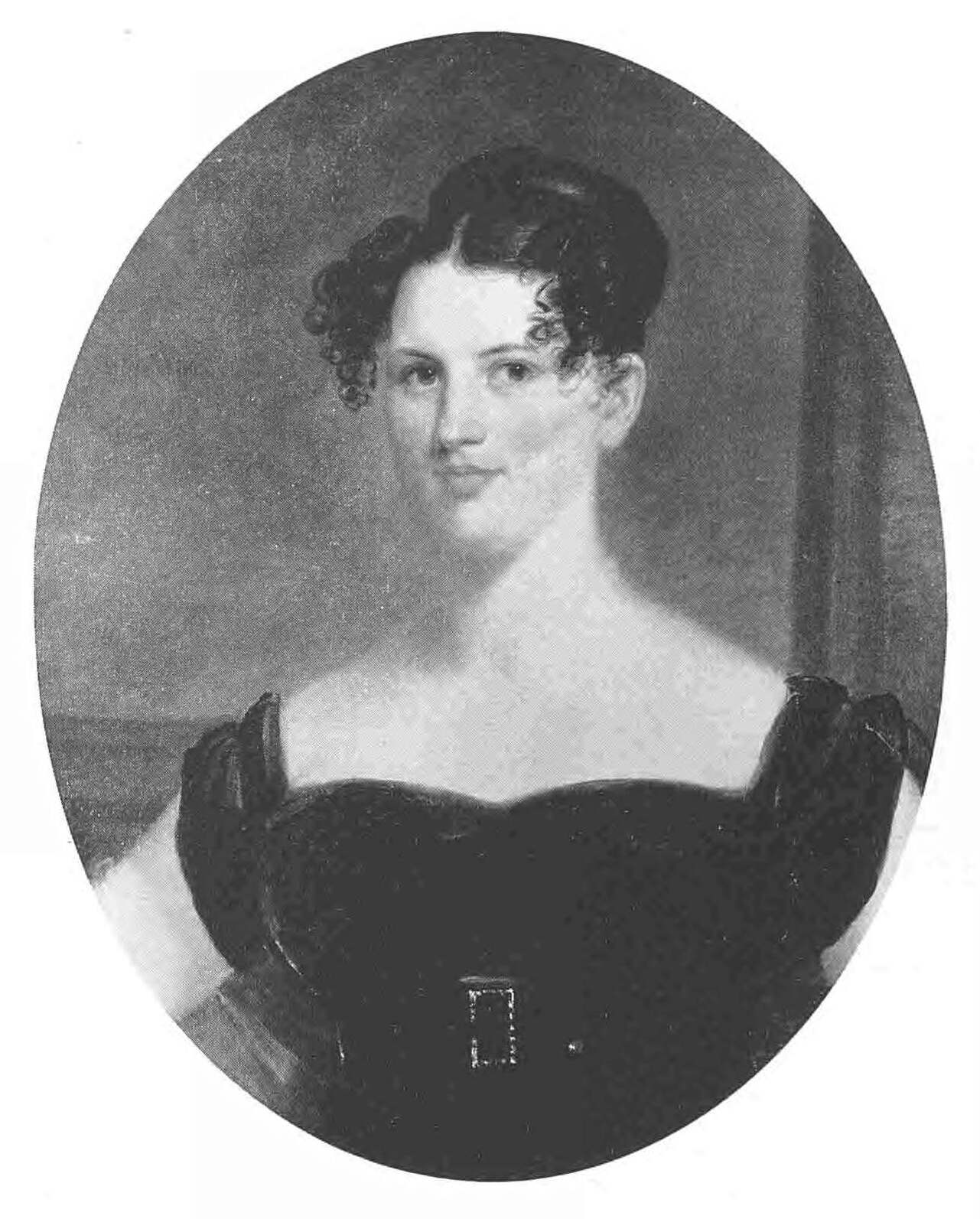
Maria Knox Innes Todd, portrait by Matthew Harris Jouett

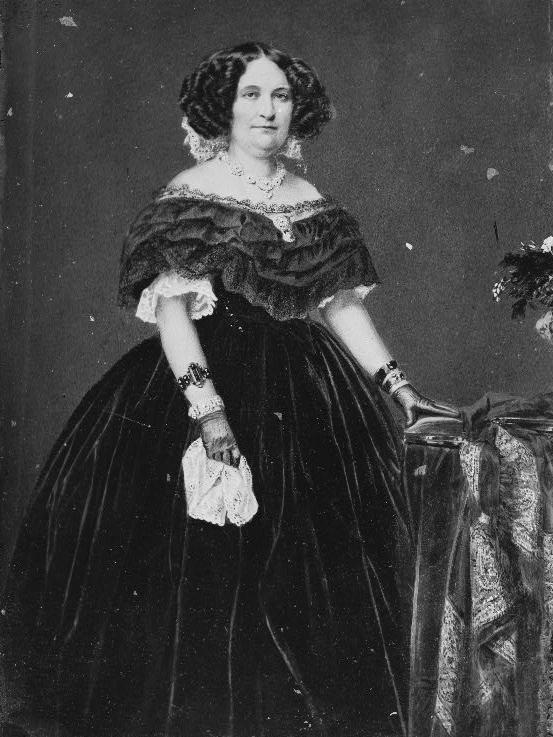
Elizabeth Moss

On May 27, 1811, Crittenden married Sarah O. Lee at her home in Versailles. Lee was a member of the Lee family of Virginia and a cousin of future U.S. President Zachary Taylor and aunt of U.S. Senator Wilkinson Call. They had seven children before Sarah died in mid-September 1824. Among their children were Confederate major general George Crittenden and Union general Thomas Leonidas Crittenden. Their daughter Sallie Lee "Maria" Crittenden was the mother of John C. Watson, a Rear Admiral in the U.S. Navy during the late 19th century. Their daughter Ann Mary Butler Crittenden Coleman published in 1864, Life and Letters of John J. Crittenden, a biography of her father's life.

On November 15, 1826, Crittenden married Maria Knox Todd, a widow who was the daughter of Judge Harry Innes. (Her first husband John Harris Todd was a son of US Supreme Court Justice Thomas Todd) Crittenden took Todd's three children as his own, and the couple had two more children: John and Eugene. Todd's daughter Catherine married her stepbrother, Crittenden's son Thomas; their son, John Jordan Crittenden III, was killed at the Battle of the Little Bighorn. Maria Knox Todd Crittenden died on September 8, 1851, of an unknown illness.

On February 27, 1853, the twice-widowed Crittenden married his third wife, Elizabeth Moss. Moss was also twice-widowed, most recently to General William Henry Ashley. Moss was Crittenden's wife until his death.

== Legacy and honors ==
- In Kentucky, Crittenden County and the town of Crittenden are named for him.
- The World War II Liberty Ship SS John J. Crittenden was named in his honor.
- Camp Floyd in Utah was renamed Fort Crittenden in his honor.

== Notes ==
- ^[a]Available sources leave some uncertainty and ambiguity regarding the exact timeline of Crittenden's education. All seem to agree on his graduation from William and Mary in 1806 and admission to the bar in 1807. Sources disagree on matriculation and graduation dates, as well as Crittenden's age and the duration of his studies at the other institutions.

U.S. Senate
Preceded by Martin D. Hardin	U.S. Senator (Class 2) from Kentucky; 1817–1819; Served alongside: Isham Talbot	Succeeded by Richard Mentor Johnson
Preceded by Dudley Chase	Chair of the Senate Judiciary Committee; 1817–1818	Succeeded by James Burrill Jr.
Preceded by George M. Bibb	U.S. Senator (Class 2) from Kentucky; 1835–1841; Served alongside: Henry Clay	Succeeded by James Turner Morehead
Preceded by Henry Clay	U.S. Senator (Class 3) from Kentucky; 1842–1848; Served alongside: James Turner Morehead, Joseph R. Underwood	Succeeded by Thomas Metcalfe
Preceded by William C. Preston	Chair of the Senate Military Affairs Committee; 1842–1845	Succeeded by Thomas Benton
Preceded by Archibald Dixon	U.S. Senator (Class 3) from Kentucky; 1855–1861; Served alongside: John Burton Thompson, Lazarus W. Powell	Succeeded by John C. Breckinridge
Preceded by Thomas Lanier Clingman	Chair of the Senate Revolutionary Claims Committee; 1859–1961	Succeeded by Preston King
Political offices
Preceded by Lewis Sanders Jr.	Secretary of State of Kentucky; 1834–1835	Succeeded by James Chamberlayne Pickett
Preceded by William Owsley	Governor of Kentucky; 1848–1850	Succeeded by John L. Helm
Legal offices
Preceded by Henry D. Gilpin	United States Attorney General; 1841	Succeeded by Hugh S. Legaré
Preceded by Reverdy Johnson	United States Attorney General; 1850–1853	Succeeded by Caleb Cushing
Party political offices
Preceded by William Owsley	Whig nominee for Governor of Kentucky; 1848	Succeeded by Archibald Dixon
U.S. House of Representatives
Preceded by William E. Simms	Member of the U.S. House of Representatives from Kentucky's 8th congressional district 1861–1863	Succeeded by William H. Randall
Preceded by Thomas Corwin	Chair of the House Foreign Affairs Committee; 1861–1863	Succeeded by Henry Winter Davis
