= Joseph R. Underwood =

American politician

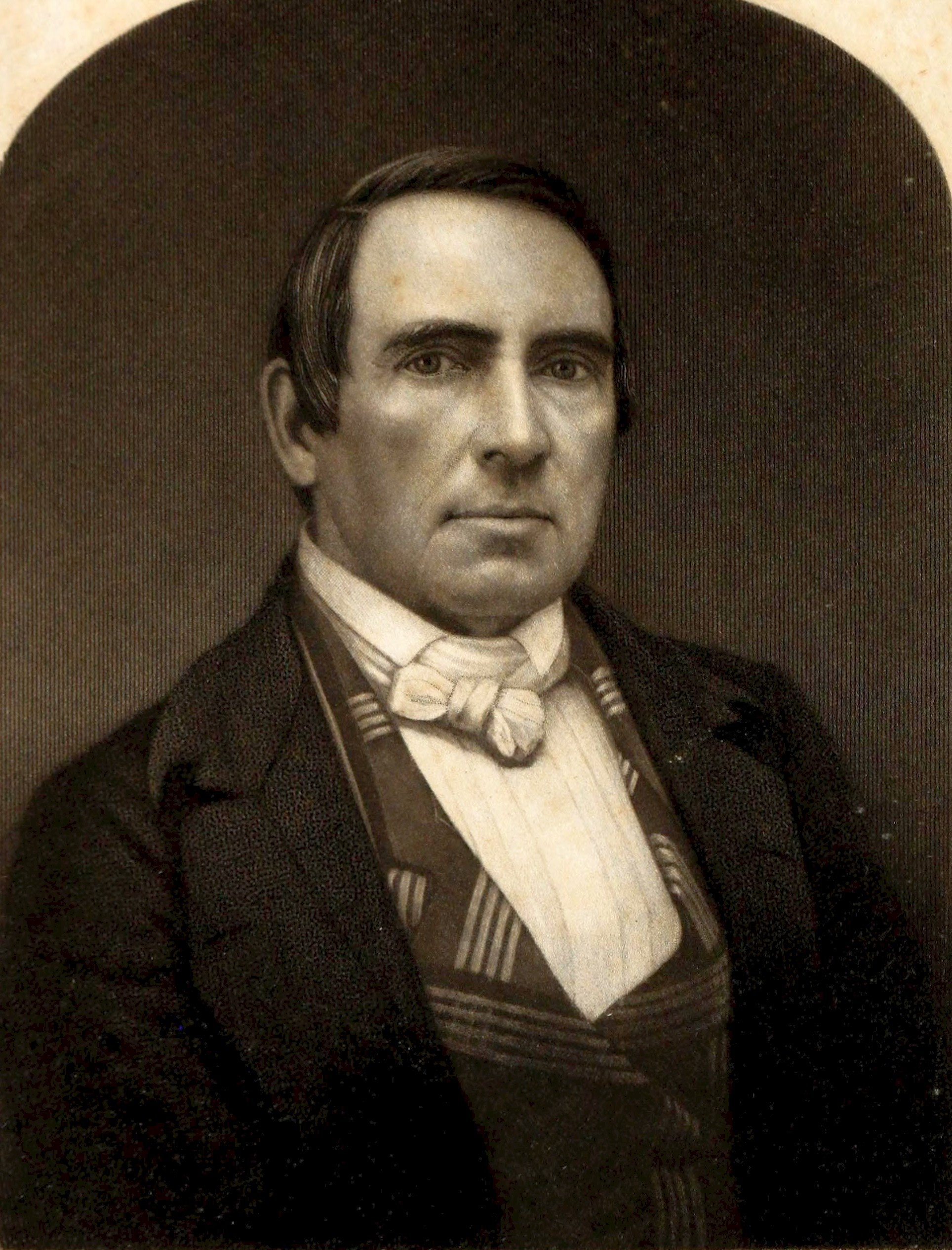

United States Senator from Kentucky
- In office March 4, 1847 – March 3, 1853
- Preceded by: James T. Morehead
- Succeeded by: John B. Thompson

Member of the U.S. House of Representatives from Kentucky's 3rd district
- In office March 4, 1835 – March 3, 1843
- Preceded by: Christopher Tompkins
- Succeeded by: Henry Grider

Member of the Kentucky House of Representatives
- In office 1816–1819; 1825–1826; 1861–1863

Personal details
- Born: Joseph Rogers Underwood; October 24, 1791 Goochland County, Virginia, U.S.
- Died: August 23, 1876 (aged 84) Bowling Green, Kentucky, U.S.
- Party: Whig
- Other political affiliations: Democrat
- Spouse(s): Eliza McCowes Trotter (d. 1835); Elizabeth Threlkeld Cox
- Children: Eugene Underwood, Julia Underwood Cox, Eliza Underwood Rutledge, Jane Underwood Rogers, John C. Underwood, Robert Underwood, Lily Underwood Munford, and Josephine Underwood Woods
- Education: Transylvania University
- Profession: Politician, Lawyer

Military service
- Branch/service: United States Army
- Battles/wars: War of 1812

Joseph Rogers Underwood (October 24, 1791 – August 23, 1876) was an American politician, lawyer and judge who was a United States representative and senator from Kentucky.

== Early and family life ==
Joseph Underwood was born in Goochland County, Virginia, the son of John Underwood, a veteran of the American Revolutionary War, and his wife Frances Rogers. His younger brother, Warner Lewis Underwood, later served as a representative of Kentucky's 3rd Congressional district.

In 1803, Underwood moved to Barren County, Kentucky, where he lived with his uncle, Edmund Rogers. He received his early education in private schools and graduated from Transylvania College in Lexington, Kentucky in 1811. He subsequently read law in Lexington under the tutelage of Robert Wickliffe, but interrupted his legal studies to serve in the War of 1812 as a lieutenant in the Thirteenth Regiment of the Kentucky Infantry.

On March 26, 1817, Underwood married Eliza McCowes Trotter. They had several children before her death in 1835. Their children included Eugene Underwood (1818–1893); Julia Underwood Cox (1822–1875), whose husband, John Threlkeld Cox of Washington, D.C., was the son of the mayor of Georgetown and later became a Confederate cavalry colonel and possible brevet brigadier general; Eliza Underwood Rutledge (1829–1865), whose husband became a Confederate major; and Jane Underwood Rogers (1830–1907).

After Eliza McCowes Trotter's death, Underwood married Elizabeth Threlkeld Cox (1818–1884), the sister of John Threlkeld Cox. Their children included John Cox Underwood (1840–1913), Robert Underwood (1844–1907), Lily Underwood Munford (1854–1885), and Josephine Underwood Woods (1858–1920).

== Career ==
He was admitted to the bar in 1813 and began practicing law in Glasgow, Kentucky.

Underwood served among Glasgow's town trustees and as county auditor until 1823. He was a member of the Kentucky House of Representatives from 1816 to 1819.

In 1823, he moved to Bowling Green, Kentucky, and again was elected to the State House of Representatives, serving from 1825 to 1826. He ran unsuccessfully for lieutenant governor of Kentucky in 1828, then served as a judge of the Court of Appeals from 1828 until 1835, following the Old Court-New Court controversy.

An opponent of Andrew Jackson and outspoken emancipationist, Underwood was elected as a Whig to the United States House of Representatives, serving Kentucky's District 3 from March 4, 1835, until March 3, 1843. There he was chairman of the U.S. House Committee on the District of Columbia. He declined to be a candidate for renomination in 1843, and resumed the practice of law. He was a presidential elector on the Whig ticket in 1844, and voters again elected him to the State House in 1846, where he served as speaker.

Underwood was elected as a Whig to the United States Senate and served from March 4, 1847, to March 3, 1853, when he did not run for reelection.

Underwood manumitted his slaves and sent them to Liberia, he also urged others to do likewise, although he supported the Compromise of 1850. Before the American Civil War, Underwood campaigned in Kentucky for the Constitutional Union Party. He inherited seven slaves in 1858 when his older cousin died however he immediately manumitted them as well. He wanted slavery to end, but also favored a form of gradual emancipation rather than immediate emancipation. He did not believe the federal government had the authority to impose slavery-related laws on states according to the constitution, but was opposed to secession. He ran for the state legislature again and was elected, serving two more terms, from 1861 to 1863 and fighting secessionists in the border state legislature. However, two of his sons would support the Confederacy. He attended the Democratic National Convention in 1864 and helped rebuild that party in the state. During the civil war he was a "strong Union sympathizer" and was outspoken about his support for the union.

== Death and legacy ==
Underwood died near Bowling Green. Western Kentucky University has his papers. His son John C. Underwood became a Confederate Engineer and later Bowling Green's city engineer and briefly mayor, as well as Kentucky's 21st Lieutenant Governor. His grandson Oscar Wilder Underwood (Eugene's son) became majority leader in the U.S. House as well as the U.S. Senate.

U.S. House of Representatives
Preceded by Christopher Tompkins	Member of the U.S. House of Representatives from Kentucky's 3rd congressional district 1835 - 1843	Succeeded by Henry Grider
U.S. Senate
Preceded by James T. Morehead	U.S. senator (Class 2) from Kentucky; 1847–1853; Served alongside: John J. Crittenden, Thomas Metcalfe, Henry Clay, David Meriwether, Archibald Dixon	Succeeded by John B. Thompson
