= James Guthrie (Kentucky politician) =

American politician and businessman (1792–1869)

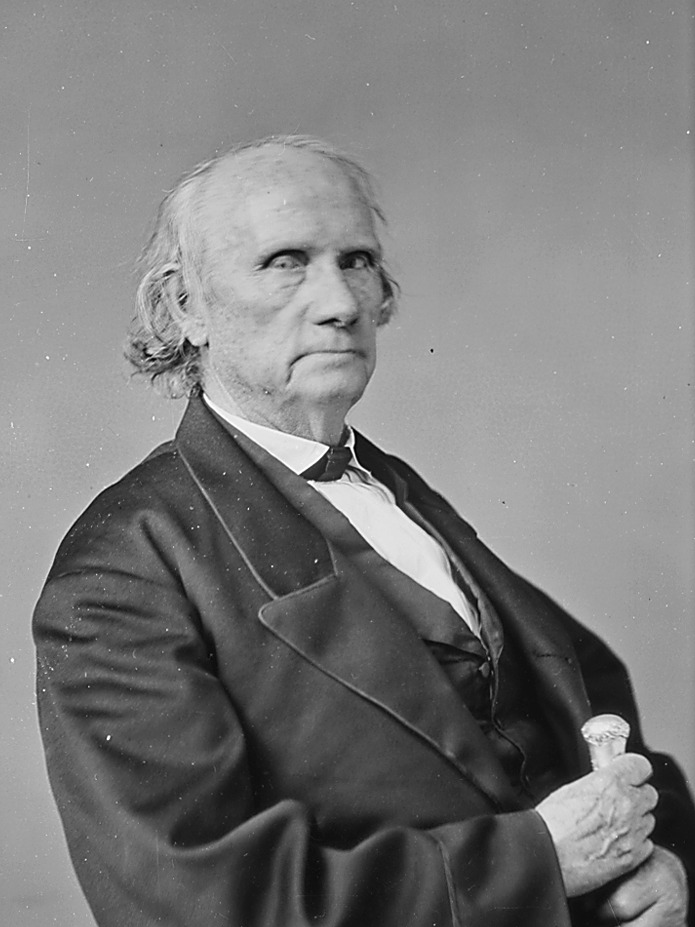
- Guthrie, c. 1860–65

United States Senator from Kentucky
- In office March 4, 1865 – February 7, 1868
- Preceded by: Lazarus W. Powell
- Succeeded by: Thomas C. McCreery

21st United States Secretary of the Treasury
- In office March 7, 1853 – March 6, 1857
- President: Franklin Pierce; James Buchanan
- Preceded by: Thomas Corwin
- Succeeded by: Howell Cobb

Member of the Kentucky Senate
- In office 1831–1840

Member of the Kentucky House of Representatives
- In office 1827–1831

Personal details
- Born: December 5, 1792 Bardstown, Kentucky, U.S.
- Died: March 13, 1869 (aged 76) Louisville, Kentucky, U.S.
- Resting place: Cave Hill Cemetery
- Party: Democratic
- Spouse: Elizabeth Churchill Prather (m. 1821; died 1836)
- Children: 3
- Relatives: J. Lawrence Smith (Son-in-law)
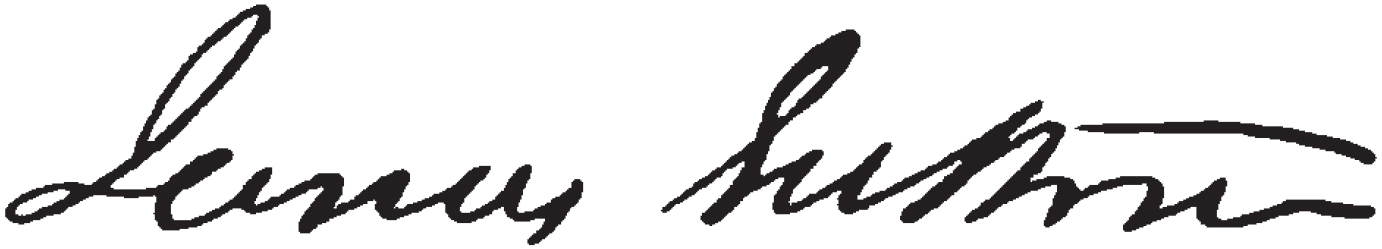
- Signature

James Guthrie (December 5, 1792 – March 13, 1869) was an American lawyer, plantation owner, railroad president and Democratic Party politician in Kentucky. He served as the 21st United States Secretary of the Treasury under Presidents Franklin Pierce and James Buchanan, and then became president of the Louisville and Nashville Railroad. After serving, part-time, in both houses of the Kentucky legislature as well as Louisville's City Council before the American Civil War (and failing to win his party's nomination in the presidential election of 1860), Guthrie became one of Kentucky's United States senators in 1865 (until resigning for health reasons in 1868 shortly before his death). Guthrie strongly opposed proposals for Kentucky to secede from the United States and attended the Peace Conference of 1861. Although he sided with the Union during the Civil War, he declined President Abraham Lincoln's offer to become the Secretary of War. As one of Kentucky's senators after the war, Guthrie supported President Andrew Johnson and opposed Congressional Reconstruction.

Guthrie also was a director of the Louisville and Portland Canal Company, the first president of the University of Louisville, and presided over the Kentucky Constitutional Convention of 1849 (which explicitly ratified slavery in the state until its abolition after the Civil War). During the Civil War, Guthrie resisted federal pressure to nationalize the Louisville and Nashville Railroad, but allowed the Union to use it to move troops and supplies.

== Early and family life ==
James Guthrie was born on December 5, 1792, in Bardstown, Nelson County, Kentucky, to General Adam Guthrie (1762–1826) and his wife, the Pennsylvania-born Hannah Polk (1765–1842). Though his grandparents emigrated from Ireland, Guthrie was of Scottish descent. and his ancestor James Guthrie was a Scottish clergyman executed in 1661 after the Restoration of King Charles I (although the Scottish parliament in 1690 posthumously reversed the bill of attainder that led to his execution).

Adam Guthrie moved from Virginia across the Appalachian Mountains into Kentucky and married Hannah Polk in 1788. They had three sons and five daughters who survived to adulthood. Having fought Native peoples until they left the area after the American Revolutionary War, the senior Guthrie developed a large plantation in Nelson County, and twice won election to the Kentucky General Assembly (serving from 1800 to 1805, and again in 1808). James Guthrie received some of his early education in a log schoolhouse. During his father's military campaigns, Guthrie studied at McAllister's Military Academy in Bardstown.

In 1812, young James Guthrie took a job on a flatboat transporting goods (and slaves) down the Ohio and Mississippi Rivers to New Orleans, Louisiana. After three such trips, he decided to change careers, and began to study law under Judge John Rowan, along with Ben Hardin and Charles A. Wickliffe.

In 1821, Guthrie married Eliza Churchill Prather. The couple had three daughters—Mary Elizabeth, Ann Augusta, and Sarah Julia—before Eliza Prather Guthrie died in 1836. Sarah Julia Guthrie married chemist J. Lawrence Smith, after whom the J. Lawrence Smith Medal is named.

== Career ==
Admitted to the Kentucky bar in 1817, Guthrie began his private legal practice in Bardstown.

In 1820, Governor John Adair appointed Guthrie as Commonwealth's Attorney for Jefferson County, Kentucky, whereupon Guthrie relocated to what was then the town of Louisville. In 1824, he served on a committee which sought to have Louisville recognized by the state legislature as a city (the state's first). The effort failed, but Guthrie was elected to the town's board of trustees, and later became its chair.

The following year, Guthrie became a director of the newly formed Louisville and Portland Canal Company. He helped secure federal funding for a bypass around the Falls of the Ohio. However, although Kentucky's long-time Senator Henry Clay supported such internal improvements, his political opponent Andrew Jackson when elected president, cut off these funds shortly after taking office in 1829. Guthrie then secured private funds and the canal was completed in late 1830. Within a few years, however, steamboats became too wide for the canal, and their increasingly high smokestacks interfedered with bridges, so it became more an impediment than an aid.

=== Kentucky politician ===
Jefferson County voters elected Guthrie, who ran as a Democrat, to the Kentucky House of Representatives in 1827. In his first year, he chaired the Internal Improvements Committee. In this capacity, he promoted construction of a number of roads and canals, as well as a railroad connecting Louisville to Frankfort. During his service in the House, Guthrie came to chair the Committee on the Courts of Justice.

In 1828, Guthrie mustered enough support to secure city status for Louisville. He was elected to the new city council, and quickly became chair of its most powerful committee, the finance committee.

Guthrie also served in the House (a part-time position) until 1831, when he was elected to the Kentucky Senate. Fellow legislators twice chose him President Pro Tempore. He served on the Finance and Education Committees. In 1834, Guthrie helped found the State Bank of Kentucky, and served as one of its directors. He unsuccessfully ran for a seat in the U.S. Senate in 1835.

Back in Louisville, Guthrie advocated constructing a new building to house both city and county government offices. Secretly, he hoped Kentucky's capital would be moved to Louisville and that building would become the state's capitol. However, the Panic of 1837 halted the courthouse's construction, as well as the water works and a bridge over the Ohio River connecting Louisville to Indiana. Some called the unfinished courthouse "Guthrie's Folly", but it was still touted as Louisville sought to become the state's capitol in 1842. All three projects were eventually completed, and Guthrie's Folly became the Jefferson County Courthouse.

In 1836, a dispute arose among the medical faculty at Transylvania University. Guthrie encouraged some of the disgruntled faculty members to relocate to Louisville and start the Louisville Medical Institute, a precursor to the University of Louisville. In 1843, Guthrie became the third president of Louisville Medical Institute. In 1846, the Kentucky General Assembly chartered the University of Louisville, which subsumed the Louisville Medical Institute. Guthrie became president of the university on December 7, 1847, and served until his death. Working with the Trustees of the Common Schools, Guthrie established a high school that met in the university's academic building; this school became Louisville Male High School.

Guthrie also promoted creating a Board of Health, as well as free public schools in Louisville. He encouraged the city to purchase the turnpike between Louisville and Portland (a town now absorbed by the city of Louisville) as well as to purchase stock in the Louisville and Ohio Railroad. He also convinced the city to buy the land that would become Cave Hill Cemetery, and his final resting place. Guthrie served on the Louisville City Council until 1839. In 1845, he was a delegate to a convention on internal improvements held in Memphis, Tennessee, and chaired by John C. Calhoun.

Guthrie represented Louisville at the Kentucky Constitutional Convention of 1849. The delegates chose him president over Whig Archibald Dixon. The major question the convention addressed was slavery. Guthrie owned enslaved persons, and believed that, if freed, the slaves would become vicious and ungovernable. The Kentucky Constitution of 1850 included explicit protections for slave property, and stipulated that no amendments could be proposed for a period of eight years.

=== National service and politics ===
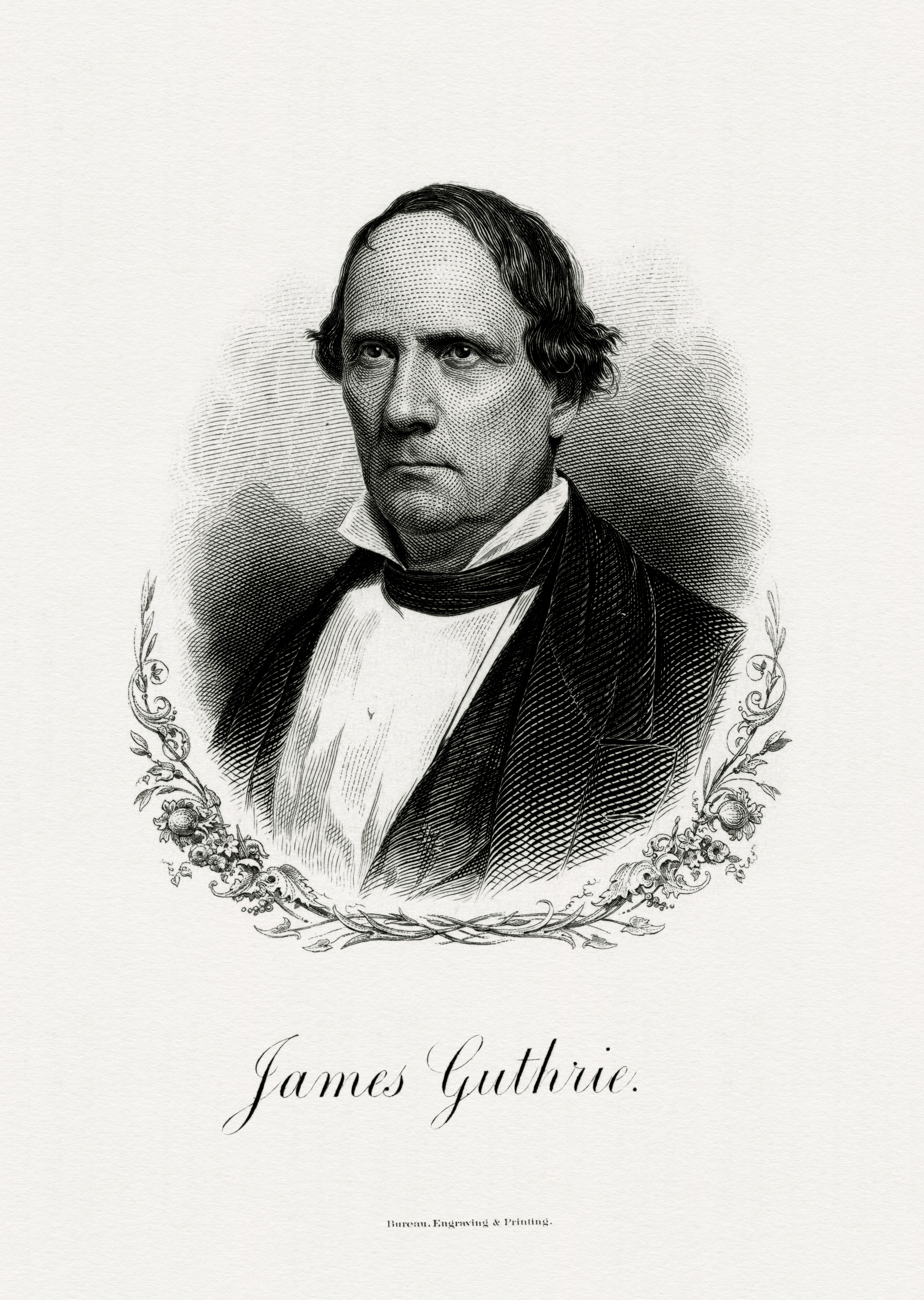
Bureau of Engraving and Printing portrait of Guthrie as Secretary of the Treasury.

President Franklin Pierce recognized Guthrie's financial acumen and appointed him Secretary of the Treasury in 1853. Soon, Guthrie became the most influential member of Pierce's cabinet. A hard money Democrat, Guthrie opposed a national bank, as well as small distinctive notes issued by free and charter banks. Instead, Guthrie advocated adoption of a universal currency that would be convertible to gold on demand. In his first report, he criticized his predecessor, Thomas Corwin, for making private arrangements for debt repurchases. He also accused Corwin of conspiring with a New York port master to under-report duties collected and deposit them into a trust. Guthrie caused a brief public uproar by removing the port master from his post.

During Guthrie's tenure, the treasury had large budget surpluses due to the discovery of gold in California. He used much of these surpluses to pay down the national debt, which shrank from $63 million in 1853 to $25 million in 1857. He also purchased silver bullion for coinage which aided struggling banks by returning money to circulation and increasing their depleted reserves. He encouraged more efficient processes in the Treasury Department as a whole, and required monthly, rather than quarterly, reports from customs agents. In 1853, Guthrie employed Captain Alexander Bowman of the U.S. Army Corps of Engineers to begin construction of an extension to the Treasury Building's south wing. Many considered Guthrie to be the ablest Secretary of the Treasury since Alexander Hamilton.

As President Pierce's term ended, Guthrie returned to Louisville and became vice-president of the struggling Louisville & Nashville Railroad. The railroad link between the two cities was completed in 1859, and in 1860, Guthrie succeeded John L. Helm as the railroad's president. He continued as the railroad's president through the Civil War, and after he became incapacitated in 1868 advocated the board's electing former Union General William Tecumseh Sherman as his successor, although the board selected Russell Houston in 1869.

Meanwhile, Kentucky, delegates to the 1860 Democratic National Convention in Charleston, South Carolina, favored Guthrie for the office of President. A two-thirds majority of delegates was required to secure the nomination. On the first of many ballots, Guthrie received 35.5 votes; by the thirty-ninth, he was up to 66.5, but still trailed the leading vote-getter Stephen Douglas, by 85 votes. With no candidate able to secure the needed votes, the meeting adjourned and reconvened in Baltimore, Maryland, a month later.

At the Baltimore meeting, Guthrie garnered 9 votes on the first ballot. He received 5.5 on the second ballot, which finally saw Douglas attain the necessary majority. Douglas was defeated by Abraham Lincoln in the presidential election. Guthrie was offered the job of Secretary of War by President Lincoln, but he declined because of age and failing health.

=== Civil War ===
Though a slave holder and states' rights advocate, Guthrie ardently opposed secession. On this topic, he stated "I hate that word secession, because it is a cheat! Call things by their right names! The Southern States have... originated a revolution." He was not convinced that Lincoln's election was an inescapable harbinger of war. He believed the Southern states, if they did not secede, would control Congress and the judiciary, and render Lincoln powerless to impose his agenda upon them.

At age 70, Guthrie was elected as one of Kentucky's six delegates to the Peace Conference of 1861 in Washington, D.C., to devise means to prevent the impending Civil War. He was chosen to chair the conference's Compromise Committee. He failed in his attempt to re-work and re-introduce the Crittenden Compromise earlier proposed in Congress by fellow Kentuckian John J. Crittenden.

The Compromise Committee proposed a plan that included seven constitutional amendments and relied on Henry Clay's Missouri Compromise as a framework. Under the committee's proposal, 36°30' north latitude would continue to divide slave and free territory in the United States, and no more territory would be annexed except with the consent of equal representation from both slave and free states. The delegates to the convention presented this idea to Congress on February 27, 1861, and asked them to call a national convention to consider the question, but Congress rejected this report.

Guthrie personally appealed to President Lincoln to consider the convention's report, but to no avail. Still convinced that war could be averted, he participated in a convention of border states held at Frankfort in May 1861. This convention also failed to avert the war.

During the war, Guthrie's Louisville and Nashville railroad was of vital importance. It was the only rail line originating in the Union and terminating in the Confederacy. Early in the war, the line was used to transport supplies to the Confederates in Tennessee, but after 1861, it was used primarily to benefit the Union. Despite pressure to relinquish control to the federal government, Guthrie remained president of the railroad, which became a frequent target for guerrilla attacks. Combining earnings from both passenger and military rates, Guthrie ensured that the line's infrastructure at the close of the war was superior to what it had been before the war started.

At the 1864 Kentucky State Democratic Convention, Guthrie was among the majority which elected delegates to the Chicago convention who were directed to support General George B. McClellan for president and Kentucky Governor Thomas Bramlette for vice president. Guthrie was also a delegate to the 1864 Democratic National Convention in Chicago. At the convention, he opposed the Wade–Davis Bill.

=== Later life ===
The Kentucky Senate narrowly chose Guthrie over fellow Louisvillian and Union general Lovell H. Rousseau for a seat in the U.S. Senate in 1865. Senator Guthrie opposed the Republican Party's Reconstruction efforts. Guthrie supported President Andrew Johnson, opposed the Freedmen's Bureau and the passage of the Fourteenth Amendment.

== Death and legacy ==
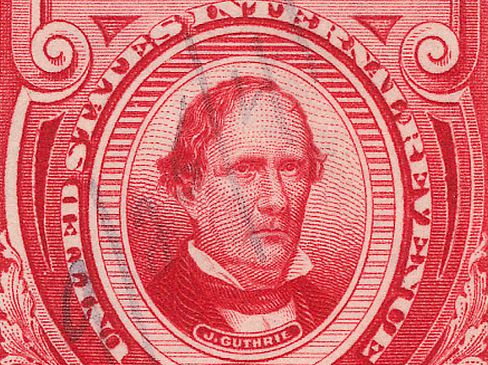
James Guthrie United States Internal Revenue $50 Documentary (tax) stamp 1940 Series

On February 7, 1868, Guthrie resigned his position due to ill health. He suffered a stroke on April 8, 1868, which left him paralyzed and bedridden for the rest of his life. On June 11, 1868, he resigned as president of the Louisville and Nashville Railroad, recommending General William Tecumseh Sherman to be his successor.

Guthrie died in Louisville on March 13, 1869, and was buried in Cave Hill Cemetery. The city of Guthrie, Kentucky, and Guthrie Street in Downtown Louisville are named in his honor.

The United States Revenue Cutter Service, a branch of the Treasury, named small patrol vessels after Guthrie, in 1868, 1888 and 1895.

== See also ==
- Louisville in the American Civil War

Political offices
Preceded by Thomas Corwin	U.S. Secretary of the Treasury; Served under: Franklin Pierce; March 7, 1853 – March 6, 1857	Succeeded by Howell Cobb
U.S. Senate
Preceded by Lazarus W. Powell	U.S. senator (Class 2) from Kentucky; March 4, 1865 – February 7, 1868; Served alongside: Garrett Davis	Succeeded by Thomas C. McCreery
Business positions
Preceded by John L. Helm	President of Louisville and Nashville Railroad; 1860–1869	Succeeded by Russell Houston
