= 1851 Kentucky gubernatorial election =

- August 4, 1851
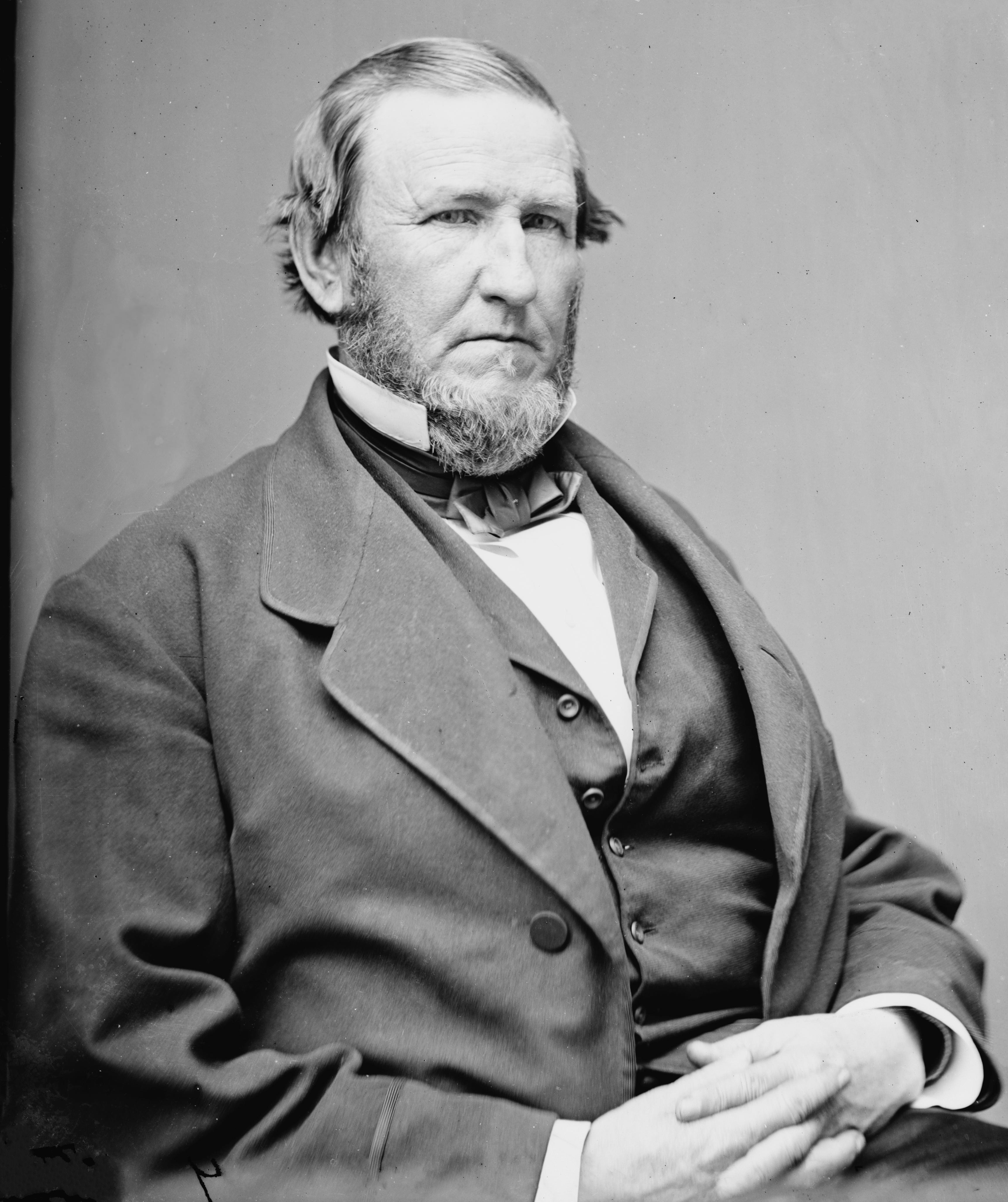

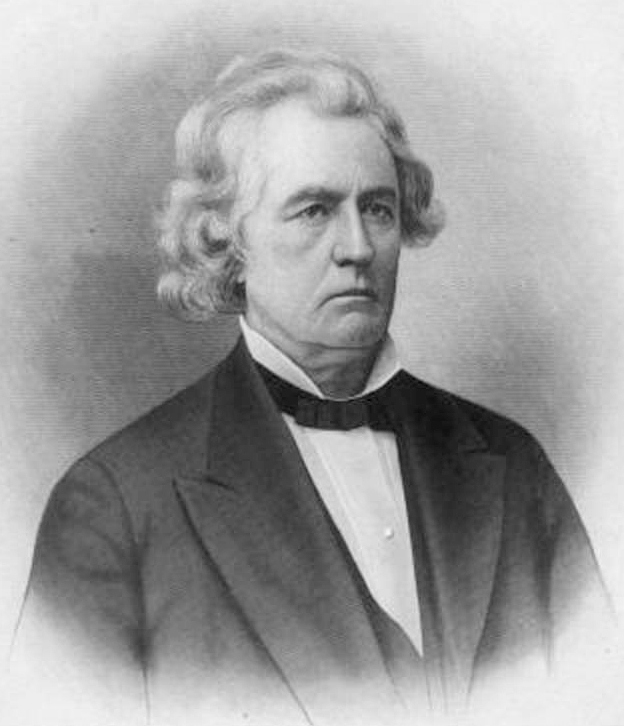
Nominee	Lazarus W. Powell	Archibald Dixon
Party	Democratic	Whig
Popular vote	54,821	54,023
Percentage	48.78%	48.07%
- Powell: 40–50% 50–60% 60–70% 70–80% 80–90% Dixon: 30–40% 40–50% 50–60% 60–70% 70–80% 80–90%
Governor before election
John L. Helm
Whig
Elected Governor
Lazarus W. Powell
Democratic

The 1851 Kentucky gubernatorial election was held on August 4, 1851, in order to elect the Governor of Kentucky. Democratic nominee and former member of the Kentucky House of Representatives Lazarus W. Powell defeated Whig nominee and former Lieutenant Governor of Kentucky Archibald Dixon.

== General election ==
On election day, August 4, 1851, Democratic nominee Lazarus W. Powell won the election by a margin of 798 votes against his foremost opponent Whig nominee Archibald Dixon, thereby gaining Democratic control over the office of Governor. Powell was sworn in as the 19th Governor of Kentucky on September 2, 1851.

=== Results ===
Kentucky gubernatorial election, 1851
Party	Candidate	Votes	%
Democratic	Lazarus W. Powell	54,821	48.78
Whig	Archibald Dixon	54,023	48.07
Emancipation-Anti Slave State	Cassius Marcellus Clay	3,531	3.14
Total votes		112,375	100.00
Democratic gain from Whig			
