= Manlius Valerius Thomson =

American politician and lawyer

Manlius Valerius Thomson (August 12, 1802 – July 22, 1850) was an American lawyer and politician who served as the 12th lieutenant governor of Kentucky under Governor Robert P. Letcher from 1840 to 1844.

== Life ==
Thomson was born in Scott County, Kentucky and studied in the common schools. He further earned his A.B. from Transylvania University in 1822.

He was a state senator for two terms, and he was elected the 11th Lieutenant Governor of Kentucky over John L. Helm by a vote of 52,423 to 35,890. Following the completion of this term as Lieutenant Governor, he was appointed in 1847 by Governor William Owsley as Colonel of the Third Kentucky Regiment during the Mexican War.

In 1850 he died of cholera at his home in Georgetown, Kentucky.

Political offices
Preceded by Charles A. Wickliffe	Lieutenant Governor of Kentucky; 1840–1844	Succeeded by Archibald Dixon
