= Lazarus Powell =

American politician (1812–1867)

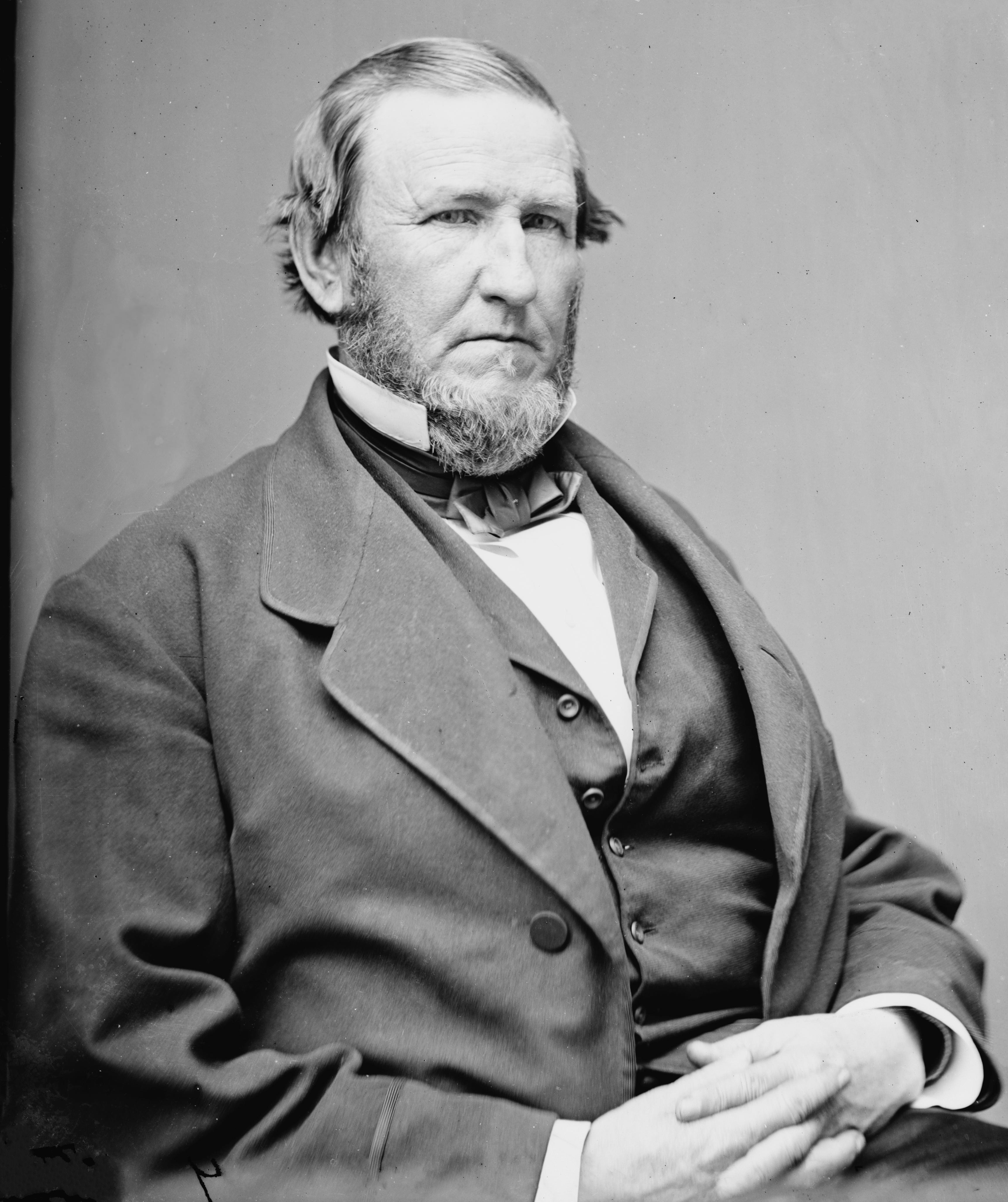

United States Senator from Kentucky
- In office March 4, 1859 – March 3, 1865
- Preceded by: John Thompson
- Succeeded by: James Guthrie

19th Governor of Kentucky
- In office September 2, 1851 – September 4, 1855
- Lieutenant: John Thompson
- Preceded by: John L. Helm
- Succeeded by: Charles S. Morehead

Member of the Kentucky House of Representatives
- In office 1836

Personal details
- Born: Lazarus Whitehead Powell; October 6, 1812 Henderson County, Kentucky, U.S.
- Died: July 3, 1867 (aged 54) Henderson County, Kentucky, U.S.
- Party: Democratic
- Spouse: Harriet Jennings
- Education: Saint Joseph's College (BA); Transylvania University

Lazarus Whitehead Powell (October 6, 1812 – July 3, 1867) was an American politician who was the 19th governor of Kentucky, serving from 1851 to 1855. He served as a U.S. senator from Kentucky from 1859 to 1865.

The reforms enacted during Powell's term as governor gave Kentucky one of the top educational systems in the antebellum South. He also improved Kentucky's transportation system and vetoed legislation that he felt would have created an overabundance of banks in the Commonwealth. Powell's election as governor marked the end of Whig dominance in Kentucky. Powell's predecessor, John J. Crittenden, was the last governor elected from the party of the Commonwealth's favorite son, Henry Clay.

Following his term as governor, Powell was elected to the U.S. Senate. Before he could assume office, President James Buchanan dispatched Powell and Major Benjamin McCulloch to Utah to ease tensions with Brigham Young and the Mormons. Powell assumed his Senate seat on his return from Utah, just prior to the election of Abraham Lincoln as president. Powell became an outspoken critic of Lincoln's administration, so much so that the Kentucky General Assembly asked for his resignation and some of his fellow senators tried to have him expelled from the body, though both groups later renounced their actions. He was also a slave owner. Powell died at his home near Henderson, Kentucky shortly following a failed bid to return to the Senate in 1867.

== Early life ==
Powell was born on October 6, 1812, near Henderson, Kentucky, the third son of Lazarus and Ann McMahon^{[a]} Powell. His paternal grandparents had migrated from Banbridge, Ulster in 1771 He attended the common schools of Henderson, and was tutored by George Gayle. He earned a Bachelor of Arts degree from Saint Joseph College in Bardstown, Kentucky in 1833, and began studying law under John Rowan. He then enrolled in the Transylvania University School of Law, studying under Justice George Robertson and Judge Daniel Mayes. He was admitted to the bar in 1835, and partnered with Archibald Dixon to start a law practice in Henderson. The two remained partners until 1839.

On November 8, 1837, Powell married Harriet Ann Jennings. The couple had three sons^{[b]} before Jennings died on July 30, 1846.

== Political career ==
A Democrat in a Whig district, Powell's political career began with an 1836 bid for a seat in the Kentucky House of Representatives. He campaigned vigorously while his opponent, John G. Holloway, relied largely on his party affiliation to carry the election. This proved a critical misstep for Holloway, as Powell secured the surprise victory. Holloway apparently learned from his mistake. Upon the completion of Powell's term in 1838, Holloway challenged Powell again, and defeated him by a considerable majority. Six year later, Powell was chosen as a presidential elector on the Democratic ticket, supporting James K. Polk.

=== Governor of Kentucky ===
In 1848, Kentucky Democrats nominated Linn Boyd for governor, but Boyd declined the nomination. Powell was chosen to replace Boyd on the ticket, largely due to the influence of James Guthrie. The Whig party nominated Senator John J. Crittenden, and the race was complicated by former Vice President Richard Mentor Johnson's announcement that he would run as an independent Democratic candidate. Knowing the Democrats' chances were dimmed by having two candidates in the race, Powell arranged a meeting with Johnson, following which the latter withdrew his candidacy and pledged his support to Powell. Nevertheless, Crittenden won the election.

In the gubernatorial election of 1851, Powell was once again the Democratic Party nominee. The Whigs nominated Powell's friend and law partner, Archibald Dixon. Powell and Dixon traveled the state together, eating at the same taverns, speaking from the same platforms, and generally showing cordiality and friendliness that was rare in Kentucky politics in those days. Powell's margin of victory in the general election was a thin 850 votes, while Whig candidate John P. Thompson defeated the Democratic nominee for lieutenant governor, Robert Wickliffe, by several thousand votes. A third candidate for governor, abolitionist Cassius M. Clay, received 3,621 votes. Powell was the first Democrat elected to the office in almost twenty years. (John L. Helm had ascended to the governorship on Crittenden's resignation.)

The Whigs also maintained control of the General Assembly, and although Governor Powell was largely able to cooperate with his political opponents, some clashes did occur. As a result of the 1850 census, the General Assembly re-apportioned the state into ten congressional districts. Powell vetoed the redistricting, noting that the districts had been gerrymandered to give the fading Whig party control over the state delegation. The legislature overrode the veto. The governor was successful, however, in vetoing legislation that he felt would have created an overabundance of banks in the Commonwealth.

Powell implemented the use of the state's sinking fund to pay interest on school bonds, a measure which had passed over Governor Helm's veto, but Helm refused to carry out. In 1855, Kentucky's voters passed by landslide a measure to raise the school tax from two cents per hundred dollars of taxable property to five cents per hundred dollars. The measure enjoyed the support of both Governor Powell and superintendent of public schools Robert Jefferson Breckinridge. Under the leadership of Powell and Breckinridge, Kentucky's school system became among the strongest in the antebellum South.

Among Powell's other successes as governor was his successful lobbying of the legislature to conduct a geological survey in 1854. He also encouraged private investment in transportation in the state. During his term, the state went from having 78 miles (126 km) of railroad track in operation to having 242 miles (389 km) in operation.

=== United States Senator ===
In January 1858, Powell was elected to the United States Senate. In April of that year, President James Buchanan appointed Powell and Major Benjamin McCulloch commissioners to negotiate settlements with the Mormons in Utah. On arriving in Utah, Powell and McCulloch issued a proclamation by President Buchanan offering clemency to Mormons who agreed to submit to Federal authority. The offer was accepted, and violence was averted.

Senator Powell favored Kentucky's neutrality policy during the Civil War, but nationally, the conflict put him in a tenuous political situation. On one hand, he favored a strong national government and a strict interpretation of the U.S. Constitution. On the other hand, he was an opponent of coercion, and due to Kentucky's proximity to and being a part of the Southern states, maintained a more sympathetic view of the southern cause than legislators from northern states. During his term as governor, Powell had been critical of Northern states that refused to abide by the Fugitive Slave Act.

In 1861, Senator Powell vigorously condemned President Lincoln's decision to suspend the writ of habeas corpus. In 1862, he denounced the arrest of some citizens of Delaware—officially, the arrests were called "resolutions of inquiry" — as a violation of constitutional rights. These stances led to calls for his resignation by the Kentucky General Assembly in 1861, and some of his colleagues, led by Kentucky's other senator, Garrett Davis, unsuccessfully attempted to have him expelled from the Senate. Before the end of the war, both the General Assembly and Davis admitted being wrong in their attempts to remove him.

Following his successful defense against calls for his removal, Powell continued speaking against what he saw as violations of constitutional rights. In January 1863, he condemned General Order No. 11, an edict by Ulysses S. Grant that barred Jews from the Department of Tennessee, which included regions of Kentucky. In the same speech, he rebuked federal military interference with the elections in Kentucky. In 1864, he opposed the Thirteenth Amendment to the United States Constitution abolishing slavery, one of six senators to do so.

== Later life and legacy ==
Following his term in the Senate, he returned to Henderson and resumed his law practice. He was a delegate to the Union National Convention in 1866. In 1867, he was again nominated to the U.S. Senate, but after several ballots over several months, the General Assembly had not elected him. Powell believed many of the legislators had been elected as a result of election interference by Northern forces, and that their intent was to prevent Kentucky from electing a senator at all, diminishing her influence nationally. In light of this belief, he urged Democrats to withdraw his name and nominate someone more palatable to Union sympathizers. This they did, putting forth the name of Garrett Davis, who was subsequently elected.

Powell died in his home on July 3, 1867. The cause of death was apoplexy, apparently the result of the toll years of rheumatism had exacted on his nervous system. He is buried at the Fernwood Cemetery in Henderson, Kentucky. The state erected a 22-foot (6.7 m) high marble monument over his grave in 1870. Powell County, Kentucky, is named in honor of Governor Powell.

== See also ==
- List of United States senators expelled or censured

== Notes ==
^[a]The Encyclopedia of Kentucky lists the name as "Mahon".
^[b]The Encyclopedia of Kentucky records that the couple had four children.

Party political offices
Preceded by William Orlando Butler	Democratic nominee for Governor of Kentucky; 1848, 1851	Succeeded by Beverly L. Clarke
Political offices
Preceded by John L. Helm	Governor of Kentucky; 1851–1855	Succeeded by Charles S. Morehead
U.S. Senate
Preceded by John Thompson	U.S. Senator (Class 2) from Kentucky; 1859–1865; Served alongside: John J. Crittenden, John C. Breckinridge, Garrett Davis	Succeeded by James Guthrie
