= Kennessee =

Land along the Kentucky - Tennessee state border

Coordinates: 36°35′N 85°35′W

Kennessee is a term coined to denote land along the Kentucky - Tennessee state border that historically lay between the Walker Line surveyed by Thomas Walker and Daniel Smith in 1779-1780 and the true parallel 36 degrees and 30 minutes surveyed by Thomas J. Matthews in July–September 1826. The 6-to-12-mile-wide (9.7 to 19.3 km) strip of land below the present southern border of Kentucky between the Cumberland Gap and the point where the Tennessee River enters Kentucky was claimed both by Kentucky and Tennessee at the same time. Even after the decision was made in 1820 that the land in the strip east of the Tennessee River belonged to Tennessee, Kentucky was given the right to grant the remaining open land to settlers. If a person was born in the disputed strip after 1796, when Tennessee's claim to the Walker line as its northern boundary was recognized, and before 1826, when the dispute was settled, they could have been uncertain as to just which state to say they were born in, especially if they owned or squatted on land right on the border, leading some residents to say they lived in "Kennessee".
