= Samuel Smith Nicholas =

American judge

Samuel Smith (S.S.) Nicholas (April 1797 – November 27, 1869) was a jurist in the state of Kentucky and an author of law essays.

Born in Lexington, Kentucky, and orphaned at the age of eight, Nicholas was raised by his uncle, Baltimore merchant and Maryland Senator Samuel Smith. At the age of sixteen, he was sent as his uncle's supercargo on voyages to South America and China. In the early 1820s, Nicholas became a merchant in New Orleans. In 1825, he went to Frankfort, Kentucky, where he studied law under George M. Bibb. He gained prominence quickly and was appointed to Kentucky's highest court, the Court of Appeals, by Governor Thomas Metcalfe, and he received his commission on December 23, 1831. After resigning in 1837, he was elected that year to represent Louisville in the Kentucky House of Representatives. In 1850, he was appointed by Governor John J. Crittenden to revise the Code of Practice of Kentucky. He did so with Charles A. Wickliffe and Squire Turner, and in 1852, they released the revised code of Kentucky.

Nicholas also wrote the following works:

- Conservative Essays, Legal and Political
- Martial Law
- A Review of the Argument of President Lincoln and Attorney General Bates, in Favor of Presidential Power to Suspend the Privilege of the Writ of Habeas Corpus
- South Carolina, Disunion, and a Mississippi Valley Confederacy
- Habeas Corpus, The Law of War, and Confiscation

Judge Willard Saulsbury, Sr. quoted the works of Nicholas in his speech on the resolution proposing to expel Jesse D. Bright, and said "...we all know that since the commencement of this struggle no man has written or spoken more earnestly than has Chancellor Nicholas, of Kentucky..."
