= Mary Breckinridge =

Mary Breckinridge may refer to:

- Mary Carson Breckinridge (1881–1965), American nurse midwife, founder of the Frontier Nursing Service
- Mary Cyrene Breckinridge (1826–1907), Second Lady of the United States; wife of John C. Breckinridge
