= List of vice presidents of the United States by age =

This is a list of vice presidents of the United States by age. The first table charts the age of each vice president of the United States at the time of their inauguration (first inauguration if elected to multiple and consecutive terms), upon leaving office, and at the time of death. Where the vice president is still living, their lifespan and post-presidency timespan are calculated through November 8, 2026.

== Age of vice presidents ==
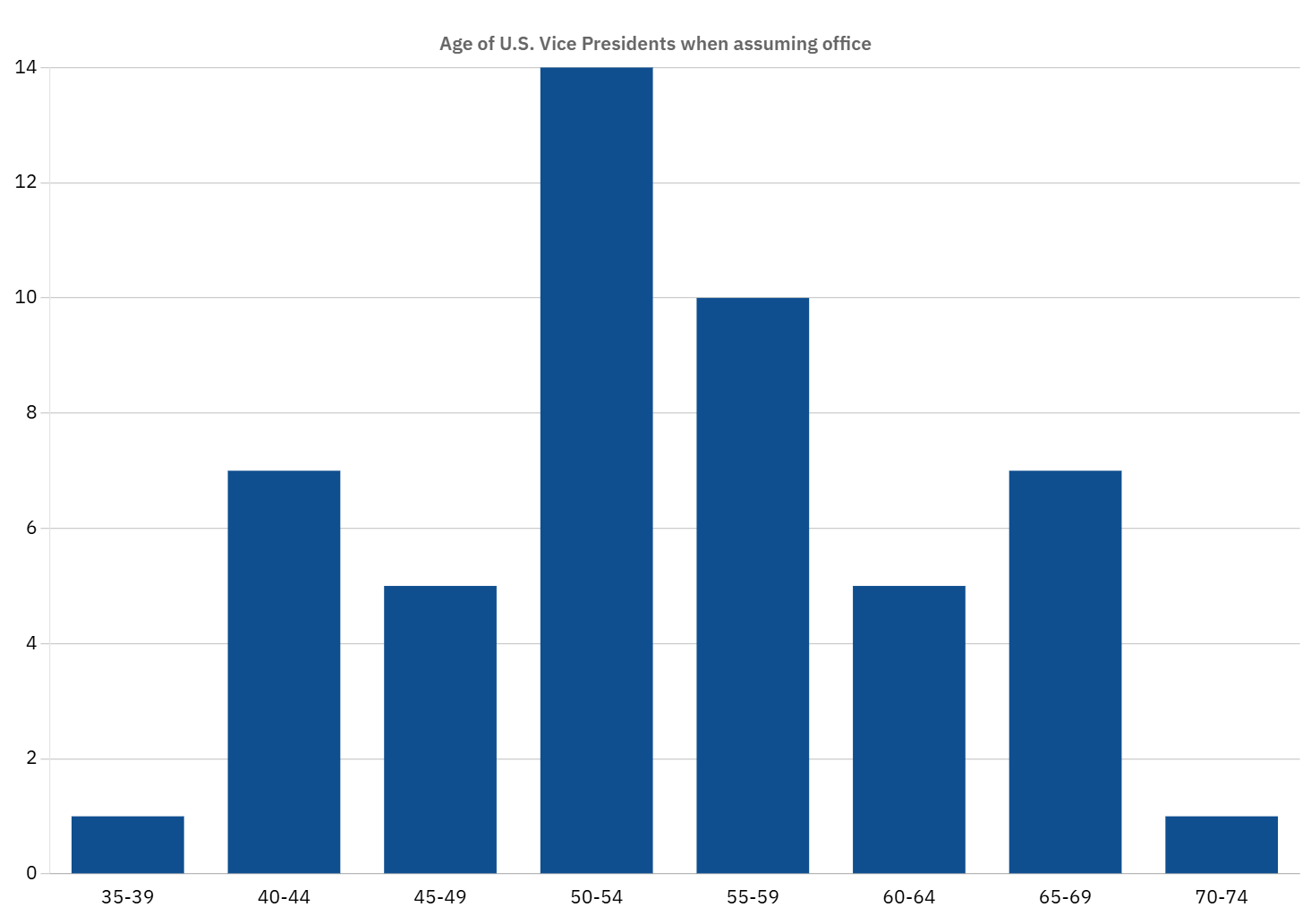
Bar graph depicting the age of vice presidents when assuming office as of January 2025

The median age upon accession to the vice presidency is around 54 years and 10 months. This is about how old John Adams and Hubert Humphrey were at the time they entered office. The youngest person to assume office was John C. Breckinridge, at the age of 36 years, 47 days. Serving only one term, he became and remains the youngest at the time of leaving office; the oldest at the time of entering office was Alben W. Barkley, at the age of 71 years, 57 days. He was also the oldest when he left office.

Born on January 16, 1821, John C. Breckinridge was younger than five of his successors, the greatest number to date: Andrew Johnson (12 years and 18 days); Hannibal Hamlin (11 years, 4 months, and 20 days); Henry Wilson (8 years and 11 months); William A. Wheeler (1 year, 6 months, and 17 days); and Thomas A. Hendricks (1 year, 4 months, and 9 days).

Born on July 8, 1908, Nelson Rockefeller was older than five of his predecessors, the greatest number to date: Lyndon B. Johnson (1 month and 19 days); Hubert Humphrey (2 years, 10 months, and 19 days); Richard Nixon (4 years, 6 months, and 1 day); Gerald Ford (5 years and 6 days); and Spiro Agnew (10 years, 4 months, and 1 day).

Three vice presidents—Hannibal Hamlin, Charles G. Dawes, and Lyndon B. Johnson—were born on August 27 (in 1809, 1865, and 1908 respectively). This is the only day of the year having the birthday of multiple vice presidents.

The oldest living vice president is Joe Biden, born on November 20, 1942 (age 83 years, 353 days). The youngest living vice president is the incumbent, JD Vance. The shortest-lived vice president was Daniel D. Tompkins, who died at the age of 50 years, 355 days, only 99 days after leaving office. The longest-lived was John Nance Garner, who died on November 7, 1967, at the age of 98 years, 350 days. He is one of six U.S. vice presidents (along with Levi P. Morton, George H. W. Bush, Gerald Ford, Walter Mondale and John Adams) to have lived into their 90s.

Daniel D. Tompkins had the shortest post-vice-presidency timespan, dying just three months after leaving office. Walter Mondale had the longest post-vice-presidency timespan, dying 40 years after leaving office.

== Vice presidential age-related data ==
No.	Vice president	Born	Age at start of vice presidency	Age at end of vice presidency	Post-VP timespan	Lifespan	
No.	Vice president	Born	Age at start of vice presidency	Age at end of vice presidency	Post-VP timespan	Died	Age
1	John Adams	Oct 30, 1735	53 years, 173 days Apr 21, 1789	61 years, 125 days Mar 4, 1797	29 years, 122 days	Jul 4, 1826	90 years, 247 days
2	Thomas Jefferson	Apr 13, 1743	53 years, 325 days Mar 4, 1797	57 years, 325 days Mar 4, 1801	25 years, 122 days	Jul 4, 1826	83 years, 82 days
3	Aaron Burr	Feb 6, 1756	45 years, 26 days Mar 4, 1801	49 years, 26 days Mar 4, 1805	31 years, 194 days	Sep 14, 1836	80 years, 221 days
4	George Clinton	Jul 26, 1739	65 years, 221 days Mar 4, 1805	72 years, 269 days Apr 20, 1812	0 days (Note: Died in office.)	Apr 20, 1812	72 years, 269 days
5	Elbridge Gerry	Jul 17, 1744	68 years, 230 days Mar 4, 1813	70 years, 129 days Nov 23, 1814	0 days	Nov 23, 1814	70 years, 129 days
6	Daniel D. Tompkins	Jun 21, 1774	42 years, 256 days Mar 4, 1817	50 years, 256 days Mar 4, 1825	99 days	Jun 11, 1825	50 years, 355 days
7	John C. Calhoun	Mar 18, 1782	42 years, 351 days Mar 4, 1825	50 years, 285 days Dec 28, 1832 (Note: Resigned from office.)	17 years, 93 days	Mar 31, 1850	68 years, 13 days
8	Martin Van Buren	Dec 5, 1782	50 years, 89 days Mar 4, 1833	54 years, 89 days Mar 4, 1837	25 years, 142 days	Jul 24, 1862	79 years, 231 days
9	Richard Mentor Johnson	Oct 17, 1780	56 years, 138 days Mar 4, 1837	60 years, 138 days Mar 4, 1841	9 years, 260 days	Nov 19, 1850	70 years, 33 days
10	John Tyler	Mar 29, 1790	50 years, 340 days Mar 4, 1841	51 years, 6 days Apr 4, 1841 (Note: Succeeded to the presidency.)	20 years, 289 days	Jan 18, 1862	71 years, 295 days
11	George M. Dallas	Jul 10, 1792	52 years, 237 days Mar 4, 1845	56 years, 237 days Mar 4, 1849	15 years, 302 days	Dec 31, 1864	72 years, 174 days
12	Millard Fillmore	Jan 7, 1800	49 years, 56 days Mar 4, 1849	50 years, 183 days Jul 9, 1850	23 years, 242 days	Mar 8, 1874	74 years, 60 days
13	William R. King	Apr 7, 1786	66 years, 331 days Mar 4, 1853	67 years, 11 days Apr 18, 1853	0 days	Apr 18, 1853	67 years, 11 days
14	John C. Breckinridge	Jan 16, 1821	36 years, 47 days Mar 4, 1857	40 years, 47 days Mar 4, 1861	14 years, 74 days	May 17, 1875	54 years, 121 days
15	Hannibal Hamlin	Aug 27, 1809	51 years, 189 days Mar 4, 1861	55 years, 189 days Mar 4, 1865	26 years, 122 days	Jul 4, 1891	81 years, 311 days
16	Andrew Johnson	Dec 29, 1808	56 years, 65 days Mar 4, 1865	56 years, 107 days Apr 15, 1865	10 years, 107 days	Jul 31, 1875	66 years, 214 days
17	Schuyler Colfax	Mar 23, 1823	45 years, 346 days Mar 4, 1869	49 years, 346 days Mar 4, 1873	11 years, 315 days	Jan 13, 1885	61 years, 296 days
18	Henry Wilson	Feb 16, 1812	61 years, 16 days Mar 4, 1873	63 years, 279 days Nov 22, 1875	0 days	Nov 22, 1875	63 years, 279 days
19	William A. Wheeler	Jun 30, 1819	57 years, 247 days Mar 4, 1877	61 years, 247 days Mar 4, 1881	6 years, 92 days	Jun 4, 1887	67 years, 339 days
20	Chester A. Arthur	Oct 5, 1829	51 years, 150 days Mar 4, 1881	51 years, 349 days Sep 19, 1881	5 years, 60 days	Nov 18, 1886	57 years, 44 days
21	Thomas A. Hendricks	Sep 7, 1819	65 years, 178 days Mar 4, 1885	66 years, 75 days Nov 25, 1885	0 days	Nov 25, 1885	66 years, 79 days
22	Levi P. Morton	May 16, 1824	64 years, 292 days Mar 4, 1889	68 years, 292 days Mar 4, 1893	27 years, 73 days	May 16, 1920	96 years, 0 days
23	Adlai Stevenson I	Oct 23, 1835	57 years, 132 days Mar 4, 1893	61 years, 132 days Mar 4, 1897	17 years, 102 days	Jun 14, 1914	78 years, 234 days
24	Garret Hobart	Jun 3, 1844	52 years, 274 days Mar 4, 1897	55 years, 171 days Nov 21, 1899	0 days	Nov 21, 1899	55 years, 171 days
25	Theodore Roosevelt	Oct 27, 1858	42 years, 128 days Mar 4, 1901	42 years, 322 days Sep 14, 1901	17 years, 114 days	Jan 6, 1919	60 years, 71 days
26	Charles W. Fairbanks	May 11, 1852	52 years, 297 days Mar 4, 1905	56 years, 297 days Mar 4, 1909	9 years, 92 days	Jun 4, 1918	66 years, 24 days
27	James S. Sherman	Oct 24, 1855	53 years, 131 days Mar 4, 1909	57 years, 6 days Oct 30, 1912	0 days	Oct 30, 1912	57 years, 6 days
28	Thomas R. Marshall	Mar 14, 1854	58 years, 355 days Mar 4, 1913	66 years, 355 days Mar 4, 1921	4 years, 89 days	Jun 1, 1925	71 years, 79 days
29	Calvin Coolidge	Jul 4, 1872	48 years, 243 days Mar 4, 1921	51 years, 29 days Aug 2, 1923	9 years, 156 days	Jan 5, 1933	60 years, 185 days
30	Charles G. Dawes	Aug 27, 1865	59 years, 189 days Mar 4, 1925	63 years, 189 days Mar 4, 1929	22 years, 50 days	Apr 23, 1951	85 years, 239 days
31	Charles Curtis	Jan 25, 1860	69 years, 38 days Mar 4, 1929	73 years, 38 days Mar 4, 1933	2 years, 341 days	Feb 8, 1936	76 years, 14 days
32	John Nance Garner	Nov 22, 1868	64 years, 102 days Mar 4, 1933	72 years, 59 days Jan 20, 1941	26 years, 291 days	Nov 7, 1967	98 years, 350 days
33	Henry A. Wallace	Oct 7, 1888	52 years, 105 days Jan 20, 1941	56 years, 105 days Jan 20, 1945	20 years, 302 days	Nov 18, 1965	77 years, 42 days
34	Harry S. Truman	May 8, 1884	60 years, 257 days Jan 20, 1945	60 years, 339 days Apr 12, 1945	27 years, 258 days	Dec 26, 1972	88 years, 232 days
35	Alben W. Barkley	Nov 24, 1877	71 years, 57 days Jan 20, 1949	75 years, 57 days Jan 20, 1953	3 years, 101 days	Apr 30, 1956	78 years, 158 days
36	Richard Nixon	Jan 9, 1913	40 years, 11 days Jan 20, 1953	48 years, 11 days Jan 20, 1961	33 years, 92 days	Apr 22, 1994	81 years, 103 days
37	Lyndon B. Johnson	Aug 27, 1908	52 years, 146 days Jan 20, 1961	55 years, 87 days Nov 22, 1963	9 years, 61 days	Jan 22, 1973	64 years, 148 days
38	Hubert Humphrey	May 27, 1911	53 years, 238 days Jan 20, 1965	57 years, 238 days Jan 20, 1969	8 years, 358 days	Jan 13, 1978	66 years, 231 days
39	Spiro Agnew	Nov 9, 1918	50 years, 72 days Jan 20, 1969	54 years, 335 days Oct 10, 1973	22 years, 343 days	Sep 17, 1996	77 years, 313 days
40	Gerald Ford	Jul 14, 1913	60 years, 145 days Dec 6, 1973 (Note: Confirmed by U.S. Congress to fill an intra-term vacancy in the vice presidency.)	61 years, 26 days Aug 9, 1974	32 years, 139 days	Dec 26, 2006	93 years, 165 days
41	Nelson Rockefeller	Jul 8, 1908	66 years, 164 days Dec 19, 1974	68 years, 196 days Jan 20, 1977	2 years, 6 days	Jan 26, 1979	70 years, 202 days
42	Walter Mondale	Jan 5, 1928	49 years, 15 days Jan 20, 1977	53 years, 15 days Jan 20, 1981	40 years, 89 days	Apr 19, 2021	93 years, 104 days
43	George H. W. Bush	Jun 12, 1924	56 years, 222 days Jan 20, 1981	64 years, 222 days Jan 20, 1989	29 years, 314 days	Nov 30, 2018	94 years, 171 days
44	Dan Quayle	Feb 4, 1947	41 years, 351 days Jan 20, 1989	45 years, 351 days Jan 20, 1993	33 years, 292 days	(living)	79 years, 277 days
45	Al Gore	Mar 31, 1948	44 years, 295 days Jan 20, 1993	52 years, 295 days Jan 20, 2001	25 years, 292 days	(living)	78 years, 222 days
46	Dick Cheney	Jan 30, 1941	59 years, 356 days Jan 20, 2001	67 years, 356 days Jan 20, 2009	16 years, 287 days	Nov 3, 2025	84 years, 277 days
47	Joe Biden	Nov 20, 1942	66 years, 61 days Jan 20, 2009	74 years, 61 days Jan 20, 2017	9 years, 292 days	(living)	83 years, 353 days
48	Mike Pence	Jun 7, 1959	57 years, 227 days Jan 20, 2017	61 years, 227 days Jan 20, 2021	5 years, 292 days	(living)	67 years, 154 days
49	Kamala Harris	Oct 20, 1964	56 years, 92 days Jan 20, 2021	60 years, 92 days Jan 20, 2025	1 year, 292 days	(living)	62 years, 19 days
50	JD Vance	Aug 2, 1984	40 years, 171 days Jan 20, 2025	(incumbent)	(incumbent)	(living)	42 years, 98 days

== Graphical representation ==
This is a graphical lifespan timeline of the vice presidents of the United States, listed in order of their first term.

The following chart shows vice presidents by their age (living vice presidents in green), with the years of their vice presidency in blue. The chart starts at 35 years as it is the minimum age to be vice president.

== See also ==
- List of presidents of the United States by age
