= Ellen Hamlin =

Second Lady of the United States

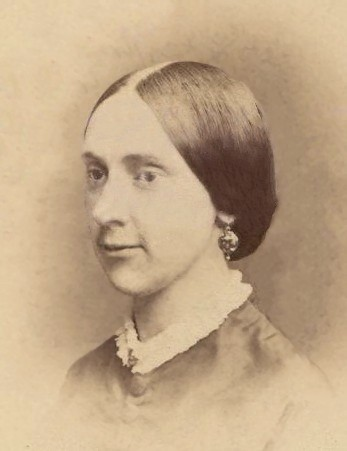

Second Lady of the United States
- In role March 4, 1861 – March 4, 1865
- Vice President: Hannibal Hamlin
- Preceded by: Mary Breckinridge
- Succeeded by: Eliza Johnson

First Lady of Maine
- In office January 8, 1857 – February 25, 1857
- Governor: Hannibal Hamlin
- Preceded by: Ann Louisa Appleton
- Succeeded by: Lucy W. Brooks

Personal details
- Born: Ellen Vesta Emery; September 14, 1835 Minot, Maine, U.S.
- Died: February 1, 1925 (aged 89) Bangor, Maine, U.S.
- Resting place: Mount Hope Cemetery (Bangor, Maine)
- Spouse: Hannibal Hamlin (m. 1856; died 1891)
- Children: 2, including Hannibal
- Parents: Stephen Albert Emery; Jennette Loring

Ellen Vesta Hamlin (née Emery; September 14, 1835 – February 1, 1925) was the second wife of Vice President Hannibal Hamlin, and served as second lady of the United States from 1861 to 1865. They were married a year after the death of his first wife Sarah Jane Emery in 1855 who was also her half-sister. She had two children with Hannibal Hamlin: Hannibal Emery, who later became the attorney general of Maine, and Frank. Hamlin also had four children from his first marriage: George Hamlin, Charles Hamlin, Cyrus Hamlin, and Sarah Hamlin Batchelder. She died in 1925 as one of the longest-living second ladies in history.

Honorary titles
Preceded by Mary Breckinridge	Second Lady of the United States; 1861–1865	Succeeded by Eliza Johnson
