= John Witherspoon Breckinridge =

American lawyer and politician

District Attorney of Merced County, California
- In office c. 1890–1892

Member of the California State Assembly
- In office 1884–1888

Personal details
- Born: December 22, 1850 Lexington, Kentucky, US
- Died: May 9, 1892 (aged 41) Merced, California, US
- Party: Democratic
- Spouse(s): Louise Tevis (m. 1877; div. 1881) Harriett Dudley
- Parent(s): John C. Breckinridge; Mary Cyrene Burch Breckinridge
- Relatives: Breckinridge family
- Education: Washington and Lee University
- Occupation: Lawyer, politician

John Witherspoon "Owen" Breckinridge (December 22, 1850 – May 9, 1892) was an American lawyer and politician who served in the California State Assembly.

== Early life ==
Breckinridge was born on December 22, 1850, in Lexington, Kentucky, in the prominent Breckinridge family. He was the fourth child of John Cabell Breckinridge (1821–1875), who served as U.S. vice president under James Buchanan, and Mary Cyrene (née Burch) Breckinridge (1826–1907). Among his siblings were Joseph Cabell Breckinridge, Clifton Rodes Breckinridge, Frances Viley (née Breckenridge) Steele, and Mary Desha (née Breckinridge) Maltby. He was named after his great-great-grandfather, John Witherspoon, who signed the Declaration of Independence.

Known as "Owen" in appreciation of the heavy vote his father received in Owen County, he attended Washington and Lee University in Lexington, Virginia.

== Career ==
Around 1877, Breckinridge moved to California eventually settling in Merced in the northern San Joaquin Valley section of the Central Valley. Breckinridge was a member of California State Assembly from 1884 to 1885. He also served as District Attorney of Merced County, California, until his death in 1892. In his obituary, it was said:

"Mr. Breckinridge was one of the most talented men in California gifted with all that goes to make up a brilliant lawyer and gentleman. Although still a young man, he had climbed high in his profession and was known in many cities and towns of California as a lawyer of unquestioned ability and of unquestioned integrity in business matters."

== Personal life ==
In 1877, Breckinridge was married to Florence Louise Tevis, a daughter of Lloyd Tevis, the President of Wells Fargo Bank. Together, they were the parents of:

- Lloyd Tevis Breckinridge (1878–1901), who attended Harvard and later killed himself at the family home in San Francisco, where he lived with his grandmother and uncle, Dr. Harry Tevis.
- John Cabell Breckinridge Sr. (1879–1914), who married Adelaide Murphy, a daughter of Samuel Green Murphy, president of the First National Bank of San Francisco, in 1902. He later became ill and was confined to a mental asylum outside of Paris.
- Florence Louise Breckinridge (1881–1956), who married Thomas Fermor-Hesketh, 1st Baron Hesketh.

Owen and Louise divorced and she remarried to Frederick William Sharon (a son of U.S. Senator William Sharon) in 1883 with whom she had four more children. Owen remarried to Harriett Dudley.

Breckinridge died on May 9, 1892, in Merced, California.

Through his son John, he was posthumously a grandfather of John Cabell "Bunny" Breckinridge Jr. (1903–1996), an actor and drag queen best known for his role as "The Ruler" in Ed Wood's film Plan 9 from Outer Space.
