= John C. Breckinridge =

Vice President of the United States from 1857 to 1861

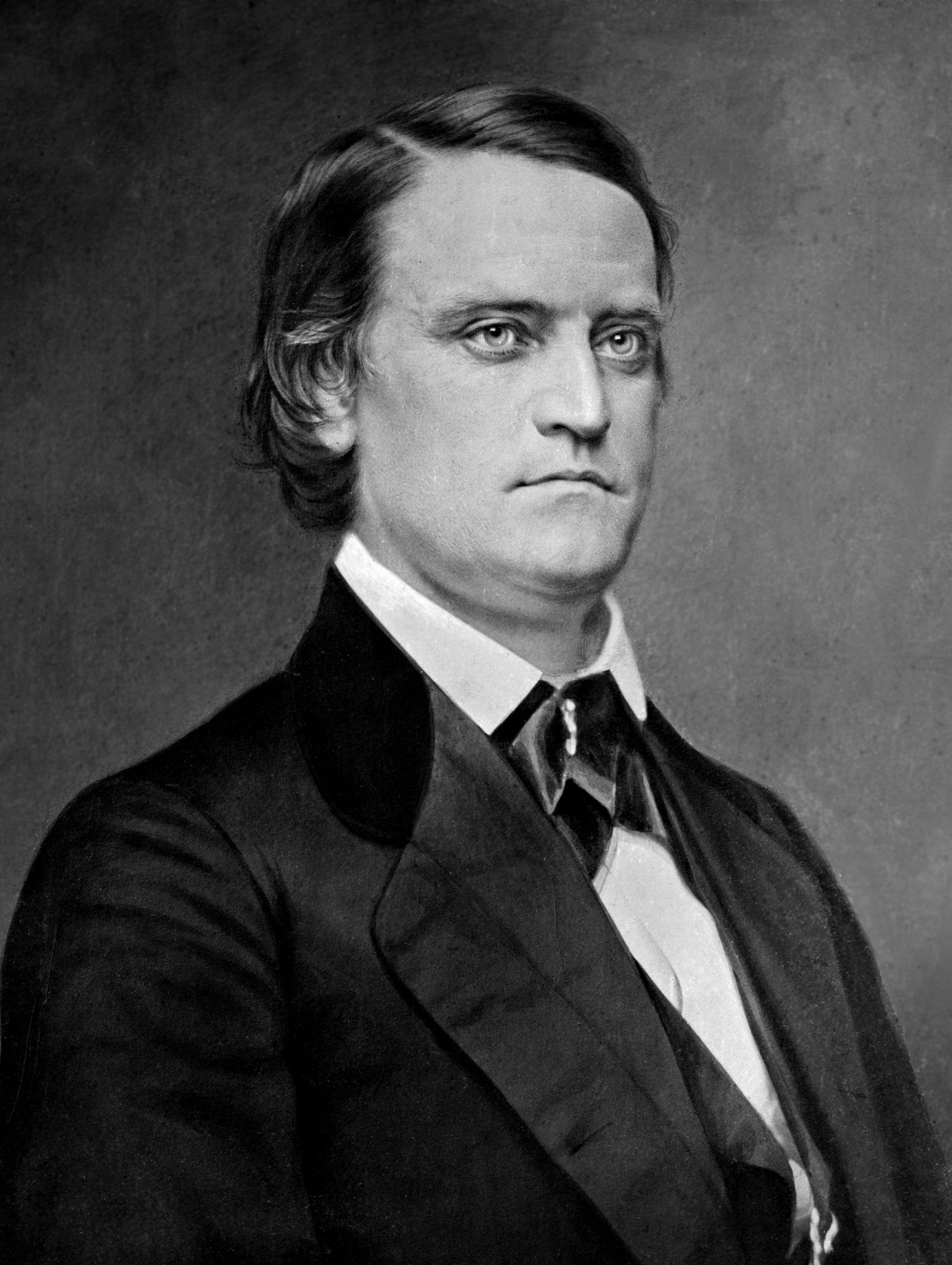
- Breckinridge in 1860

14th Vice President of the United States
- In office March 4, 1857 – March 4, 1861
- President: James Buchanan
- Preceded by: William R. King
- Succeeded by: Hannibal Hamlin

5th Confederate States Secretary of War
- In office February 6, 1865 – May 10, 1865
- President: Jefferson Davis
- Preceded by: James Seddon
- Succeeded by: Office abolished

United States Senator from Kentucky
- In office March 4, 1861 – December 4, 1861
- Preceded by: John J. Crittenden
- Succeeded by: Garrett Davis

Member of the U.S. House of Representatives from Kentucky's 8th district
- In office March 4, 1851 – March 3, 1855
- Preceded by: Charles S. Morehead
- Succeeded by: Alexander Keith Marshall

Member of the Kentucky House of Representatives from Fayette County
- In office December 31, 1849 – March 7, 1850

Personal details
- Born: John Cabell Breckinridge; January 16, 1821 Lexington, Kentucky, U.S.
- Died: May 17, 1875 (aged 54) Lexington, Kentucky, U.S.
- Resting place: Lexington Cemetery
- Party: Democratic
- Spouse: Mary Burch (m. 1843)
- Children: 6, including Clifton and John
- Parents: Cabell Breckinridge; Mary Clay Smith
- Relatives: Breckinridge family
- Education: Centre College (BA); College of New Jersey; Transylvania University

Military service
- Allegiance: United States; Confederate States
- Branch/service: United States Volunteers; Confederate States Army
- Years of service: 1847–1848 (U.S.); 1861–1865 (C.S.)
- Rank: Major (U.S.); Major general (C.S.)
- Battles/wars: Mexican–American War; American Civil War; Battle of Shiloh; Battle of Baton Rouge; Battle of Stones River; Battle of Jackson; Battle of Chickamauga; Chattanooga campaign; Battle of New Market; Battle of Cold Harbor (WIA); Battle of Piedmont; Battle of Lynchburg; Battle of Monocacy; Battle of Bull's Gap; Battle of Marion; Battle of Cool Spring

John Cabell Breckinridge (January 16, 1821 – May 17, 1875) was an American politician who served as the 14th vice president of the United States, with President James Buchanan, from 1857 to 1861. He then served as a general in the Confederate Army during the American Civil War. Having assumed office at the age of 36, Breckinridge is the youngest vice president in U.S. history. He was also the Southern Democratic candidate in the 1860 presidential election, losing to Republican candidate Abraham Lincoln.

Breckinridge was born near Lexington, Kentucky, to a prominent local family. After serving as a noncombatant during the Mexican–American War, he was elected as a Democrat to the Kentucky House of Representatives in 1849, where he took a pro-slavery stance. Elected to the U.S. House of Representatives in 1851, he allied with Stephen A. Douglas in support of the Kansas–Nebraska Act. After reapportionment in 1854 made his re-election unlikely, he declined to run for another term. He was nominated for vice president at the 1856 Democratic National Convention to balance a ticket headed by James Buchanan. The Democrats won the election, but Breckinridge had little influence with Buchanan, and as presiding officer of the Senate, could not express his opinions in debates. He joined Buchanan in supporting the pro-slavery Lecompton Constitution for Kansas, which led to a split in the Democratic Party. In 1859, he was elected to succeed Senator John J. Crittenden at the end of Crittenden's term in 1861.

After Southern Democrats walked out of the 1860 Democratic National Convention, the party's northern and southern factions held rival conventions in Baltimore that nominated Douglas and Breckinridge, respectively, for president. A third party, the Constitutional Union Party, nominated John Bell. These three men split the Southern vote, while Lincoln won all but three electoral votes in the North, winning the election. Breckinridge carried most of the Southern states. Taking his seat in the Senate, Breckinridge urged compromise to preserve the Union. Unionists were in control of the state legislature, and gained more support when Confederate forces moved into Kentucky. After fleeing behind Confederate lines, Breckinridge was commissioned a brigadier general in the Confederate Army and then expelled from the Senate.

Following the Battle of Shiloh in 1862, Breckinridge was promoted to major general, and in October, he was assigned to the Army of Mississippi under Braxton Bragg. After Bragg charged that Breckinridge's drunkenness had contributed to defeats at Stones River and Missionary Ridge, and after Breckinridge joined many other high-ranking officers in criticizing Bragg, he was transferred to the Trans-Allegheny Department, where he won his most significant victory in the 1864 Battle of New Market. After participating in Jubal Early's campaigns in the Shenandoah Valley, Breckinridge was charged with defending supplies in Tennessee and Virginia. In February 1865, Confederate President Jefferson Davis appointed him Secretary of War in the Confederate Cabinet. Concluding that the war was hopeless, he urged Davis to arrange a national surrender. After the fall of Richmond, Breckinridge ensured the preservation of Confederate records. He then escaped the country and lived abroad for over three years. When President Andrew Johnson extended amnesty to all former Confederates in 1868, Breckinridge returned to Kentucky, but resisted all encouragement to resume his political career. War injuries sapped his health, and he died in 1875. Breckinridge is regarded as an effective military commander.

== Early life ==
John Cabell Breckinridge was born at Thorn Hill, his family's estate near Lexington, Kentucky, on January 16, 1821, the fourth of six children and only son of Joseph Cabell Breckinridge from the Breckinridge family and Mary Clay (Smith) Breckinridge. His mother was a daughter of Samuel Stanhope Smith, who founded Hampden–Sydney College in 1775, and granddaughter of John Witherspoon, a signer of the Declaration of Independence. Having previously served as speaker of the Kentucky House of Representatives, Breckinridge's father had been appointed Kentucky's secretary of state just prior to his son's birth. In February 1821, the family moved with Governor John Adair to the Governor's Mansion in Frankfort, so his father could better attend to his duties as secretary of state.

In August 1823, an illness referred to as "the prevailing fever" struck Frankfort, and Cabell Breckinridge took his children to stay with his mother in Lexington. On his return, both his wife and he fell ill. Cabell Breckinridge died, but she survived. His assets were not enough to pay his debts, and his widow joined the children in Lexington, supported by her mother-in-law. While in Lexington, Breckinridge attended Pisgah Academy in Woodford County. His grandmother taught him the political philosophies of her late husband, John Breckinridge, who served in the U.S. Senate and as attorney general under President Thomas Jefferson. As a state legislator, Breckinridge had introduced the Kentucky Resolutions in 1798, which stressed states' rights and endorsed the doctrine of nullification in response to the Alien and Sedition Acts.

After an argument between Breckinridge's mother and grandmother in 1832, his mother, his sister Laetitia, and he moved to Danville, Kentucky, to live with his sister Frances and her husband, John C. Young, who was president of Centre College. Breckinridge's uncle, William Breckinridge, was also on the faculty there, prompting him to enroll in November 1834. Among his schoolmates were Beriah Magoffin, William Birney, Theodore O'Hara, Thomas L. Crittenden, and Jeremiah Boyle. After earning a Bachelor of Arts in September 1838, he spent the following winter as a "resident graduate" at the College of New Jersey (now Princeton University). Returning to Kentucky in mid-1839, he read law with Judge William Owsley. In November 1840, he enrolled in the second year of the law course at Transylvania University in Lexington, where his instructors included George Robertson and Thomas A. Marshall of the Kentucky Court of Appeals. On February 25, 1841, he received a Bachelor of Laws and was licensed to practice the next day.

== Early legal career ==
Breckinridge remained in Lexington while deciding where to begin practice, borrowing law books from the library of John J. Crittenden, Thomas Crittenden's father. Deciding that Lexington was overcrowded with lawyers, he moved to Frankfort, but was unable to find an office. After being spurned by a love interest, former classmate Thomas W. Bullock and he departed for the Iowa Territory on October 10, 1841, seeking better opportunities. They considered settling on land Breckinridge had inherited in Jacksonville, Illinois, but they found the bar stocked with able men such as Stephen A. Douglas and Abraham Lincoln. They continued on to Burlington, Iowa, and by the winter of 1842–1843, Breckinridge reported to family members that his firm handled more cases than almost any other in Burlington. Influenced by Bullock and the citizens of Iowa, he identified with the Democratic Party, and by February 1843, he had been named to the Democratic committee of Des Moines County. Most of the Kentucky Breckinridges were Whigs, and when he learned of his nephew's party affiliation, William Breckinridge declared, "I felt as I would have done if I had heard that my daughter had been dishonored."

Breckinridge visited Kentucky in May 1843. His efforts to mediate between his mother and the Breckinridges extended his visit, and after he contracted influenza, he decided to remain for the summer rather than returning to Iowa's colder climate. He met Bullock's cousin, Mary Cyrene Burch, and by September, they were engaged. In October, Breckinridge went to Iowa to close out his business, then returned to Kentucky and formed a law partnership with Samuel Bullock, Thomas's cousin. He married on December 12, 1843, and settled in Georgetown, Kentucky. The couple had six children – Joseph Cabell (b. 1844), Clifton Rodes (b. 1846; later a Congressman from Arkansas), Frances (b. 1848), John Milton (b. 1849), John Witherspoon (b. 1850), and Mary Desha (b. 1854). Gaining confidence in his ability as a lawyer, Breckinridge moved his family back to Lexington in 1845 and formed a partnership with future U.S. Senator James B. Beck.

== Mexican–American War ==
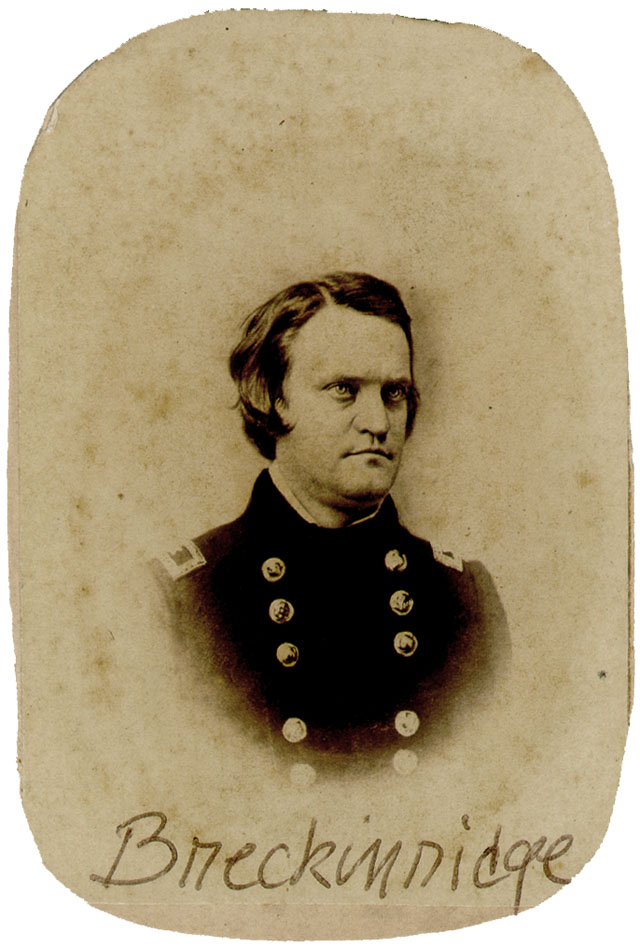
Breckinridge in an undated photo

A supporter of the Mexican–American War, Breckinridge sought appointment to the staff of Major General William Orlando Butler, a prominent Kentucky Democrat, but Butler could only offer him an unpaid aide position and advised him to decline it. In July 1847, Breckinridge delivered an address at a mass military funeral in Frankfort to honor Kentuckians killed in the Battle of Buena Vista. The oration brought Whig Senator Henry Clay of Kentucky, whose son was among the dead, to tears, and inspired Theodore O'Hara to write "Bivouac of the Dead".

Breckinridge again applied for a military commission after William Owsley, the governor of Kentucky, called for two additional regiments on August 31, 1847. Owsley's advisors encouraged the Whig governor to commission at least one Democrat, and Whig Senator John J. Crittenden supported Breckinridge's application. On September 6, 1847, Owsley appointed Manlius V. Thomson as colonel, Thomas Crittenden as lieutenant colonel, and Breckinridge as major of the Third Kentucky Infantry Regiment. The regiment left Kentucky on November 1 and reached Veracruz by November 21. After a serious epidemic of la Vomito, or yellow fever, broke out at Veracruz, the regiment hurried to Mexico City. Reports indicate that Breckinridge walked all but two days of the journey, allowing weary soldiers to use his horse. When they reached Mexico City on December 18, the fighting was almost over; they participated in no combat and remained as an army of occupation until May 30, 1848.

In demand more for his legal expertise than his military training, he was named as assistant counsel for Gideon Johnson Pillow during a court of inquiry initiated against him by Winfield Scott. Seeking to derail Scott's presidential ambitions, Pillow and his supporters composed and published letters that lauded Pillow, not Scott, for the American victories at Contreras and Churubusco. To hide his involvement, Pillow convinced a subordinate to take credit for the letter he wrote. Breckinridge biographer William C. Davis writes that it is "most unlikely" that Breckinridge knew the details of Pillow's intrigue. His role in the proceedings was limited to questioning a few witnesses; records show that Pillow represented himself during the court's proceedings.

Returning to Louisville on July 16, the Third Kentucky mustered out on July 21. During their time in Mexico, over 100 members of the 1,000-man regiment died of illness. Although he saw no combat, Breckinridge's military service proved an asset to his political prospects.

== Political career ==
=== Early political career ===
Breckinridge campaigned for Democratic presidential nominee James K. Polk in the 1844 election. He decided against running for county clerk of Scott County after his law partner complained that he spent too much time in politics. In 1845, some local Democrats encouraged him to seek the Eighth District's congressional seat, but he declined, supporting Alexander Keith Marshall, the party's unsuccessful nominee. As a private citizen, he opposed the Wilmot Proviso that would have banned slavery in the territory acquired in the war with Mexico. In the 1848 presidential election, he backed the unsuccessful Democratic ticket of Lewis Cass and William Butler. He did not vote in the election. Defending his decision during a speech in Lexington on September 5, 1860, Breckinridge explained:

But it so happened that there were six or eight gentlemen also accompanying me, all of them belonging to the Whig Party, and they proposed to me that if I would not return to my own town and vote, they would not. If they would, there would be six or seven votes cast for Taylor and but one cast for Cass. I accepted the proposition, and we went hunting; and had every man done as well as myself, we should have carried the State by 40,000 majority.

=== Kentucky House of Representatives ===
In August 1849, Kentuckians elected delegates to a state constitutional convention in addition to state representatives and senators. Breckinridge's abolitionist uncles, William and Robert, joined with Cassius Marcellus Clay to nominate slates of like-minded candidates for the constitutional convention and the legislature. In response, a bipartisan group of pro-slavery citizens organized its own slate of candidates, including Breckinridge for one of Fayette County's two seats in the House of Representatives. Breckinridge, who by this time enslaved five people, had publicly opposed "impairing in any form" the legal protection of slavery. Despite his endorsement of slavery protections, he was a member of the Freemasons and the First Presbyterian Church in Lexington, both of which officially opposed slavery. He had also previously represented free blacks in court, expressed support for voluntary emancipation, and supported the Kentucky Colonization Society, which was dedicated to the relocation of free blacks to Liberia.

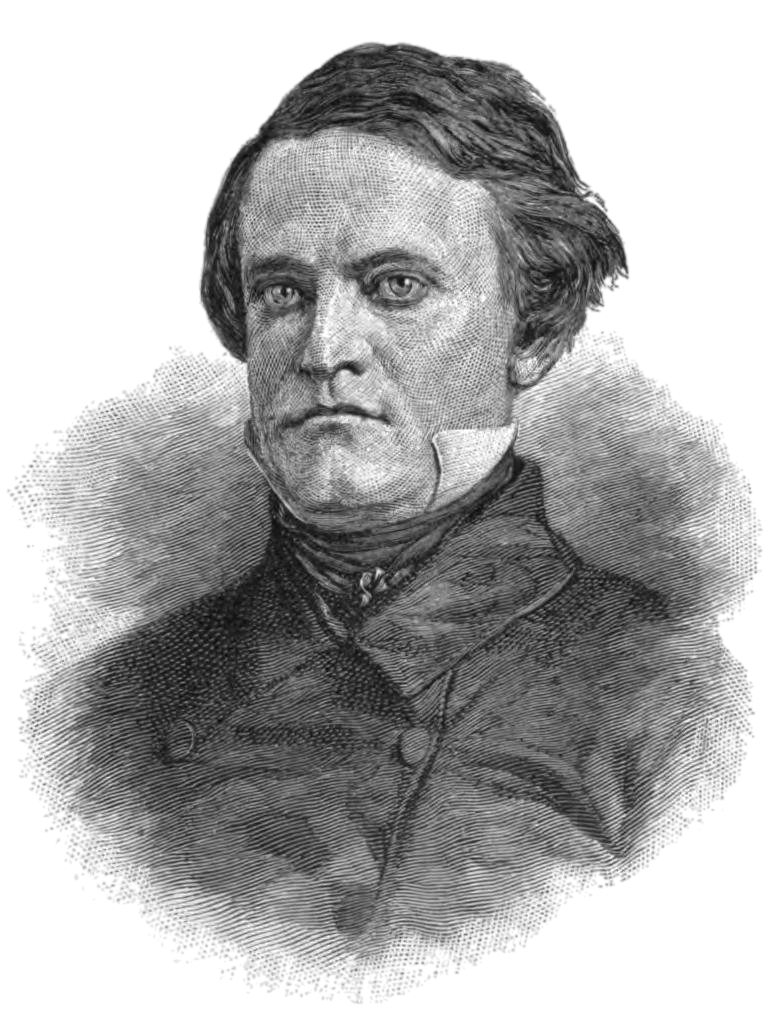
Breckinridge, circa 1850

Breckinridge received 1,481 votes, over 400 more than his nearest competitor, making this the first time that Fayette County had elected a Democrat to the state House of Representatives. Between the election and the legislative session, Breckinridge formed a new law partnership with Owsley's former secretary of state, George B. Kinkead, his previous partner having died in a cholera epidemic earlier in the year. He also co-founded the Kentucky Statesman, a semiweekly Democratic newspaper, and visited his step-cousin, Mary Todd, where he met her husband, Abraham Lincoln, for the first time; despite their political differences, they became friends.

When the House convened, Breckinridge received a plurality of votes for speaker, but fell at least eight votes short of a majority. Unable to break the deadlock, he withdrew, and the position went to Whig Thomas Reilly. Biographer Frank H. Heck wrote that Breckinridge was the leader of the House Democratic caucus during the session, during which time most of the measures considered were "local or personal and in any case, petty". Breckinridge was assigned to the House's standing committees on federal relations and the judiciary. He supported bills allocating funding for internal improvements, a traditionally Whig stance. As Congress debated Henry Clay's proposed Compromise of 1850, the four Whigs on the Committee on Federal Relations drew up resolutions urging the Kentucky congressional delegation to support the compromise as a "fair, equitable, and just basis" for settlement of the slavery issue in the newly acquired U.S. territories. Breckinridge felt that the resolution was too vague, and authored a minority report that explicitly denied federal authority to interfere with slavery in states and territories. Both sets of resolutions, and a set adopted by the Senate, were all laid on the table.

On March 4, 1850, three days before the end of the session, Breckinridge took a leave of absence to care for his son, John Milton, who had become ill; he died on March 18. Keeping a busy schedule in order to cope with his grief, he urged adoption of the proposed constitution at a series of meetings around the state. His only concern with the document was its lack of an amendment process. The constitution was overwhelmingly ratified in May. Democrats wanted to nominate him for re-election, but he declined, citing problems "of a private and imperative character". Davis wrote that "his problem – besides continuing sadness over his son's death – was money."

=== U.S. Representative ===
==== First term (1851–1853) ====
Breckinridge was a delegate to the January 8, 1851, state Democratic convention, which nominated Lazarus W. Powell for governor. A week later, he announced that he would seek election to Congress from Kentucky's Eighth District. Nicknamed the "Ashland district" because it contained Ashland, the estate of Whig Party founder Henry Clay, and much of the area Clay once represented, the district was a Whig stronghold. In the previous congressional election, Democrats had not even nominated a candidate. Breckinridge's opponent, Leslie Combs, was a former state legislator whose popularity was bolstered by his association with Clay and his participation in the War of 1812; he was expected to win the election easily. In April, the candidates held a debate in Frankfort, and in May, they jointly canvassed the district, making daily speeches. Breckinridge reiterated his strict constructionist view of the U.S. Constitution and denounced the protective tariffs advocated by the Whigs, stating that "free thought needs free trade". His strong voice and charismatic personality contrasted with the campaign style of the much older Combs. On election day, he carried only three of the district's seven counties, but accumulated a two-to-one victory margin in Owen County, winning the county by 677 votes and the election by 537. Democrats carried five of Kentucky's 10 congressional districts, and Powell was elected as the first Democratic governor since 1834.

Supporters promoted Breckinridge for Speaker of the House, but he refused to allow his own nomination and voted with the majority to elect fellow Kentuckian Linn Boyd. Despite this, the two were factional enemies, and Boyd assigned Breckinridge to the lightly regarded Committee on Foreign Affairs. Breckinridge's first speech, and several subsequent ones, were made to defend William Butler, again a presidential aspirant in 1852, from charges leveled by proponents of the Young America movement that he was too old and had not made his stance on slavery clear. The attacks came from the pages of George Nicholas Sanders's Democratic Review, and on the House floor from several men, nearly all of whom supported Stephen Douglas for the nomination. These men included California's Edward C. Marshall, who was Breckinridge's cousin. Their attacks ultimately hurt Douglas's chances for the nomination, and Breckinridge's defense of Butler enhanced his own reputation. After this controversy, he was more active in the chamber's debates, but introduced few significant pieces of legislation. He defended the constitutionality of the Fugitive Slave Act of 1850 against attacks by Ohio Representative Joshua Giddings, and opposed Andrew Johnson's proposed Homestead Act out of concern that it would create more territories that excluded slavery. Despite his campaign rhetoric that federal funds should only be used for internal improvements "of a national character", he sought to increase Kentucky's federal allocation for construction and maintenance of rivers and harbors, and supported bills that benefited his district's hemp farmers.

Returning home from the legislative session, Breckinridge made daily visits with Henry Clay, who lay dying in Lexington, and was chosen to deliver Clay's eulogy in Congress when the next session commenced. The eulogy enhanced his popularity and solidified his position as Clay's political heir apparent. He also campaigned for the election of Democrat Franklin Pierce as president. Although Pierce lost Kentucky by 3,200 votes, Breckinridge wielded more influence with him than he had with outgoing Whig President Millard Fillmore. A week after his inauguration, Pierce offered Breckinridge an appointment as governor of Washington Territory. He had initially sought the appointment, securing letters of recommendation from Powell and Butler, but by the time it was offered, he had decided to stay in Kentucky and seek re-election to the House.

==== Second term (1853–1855) ====
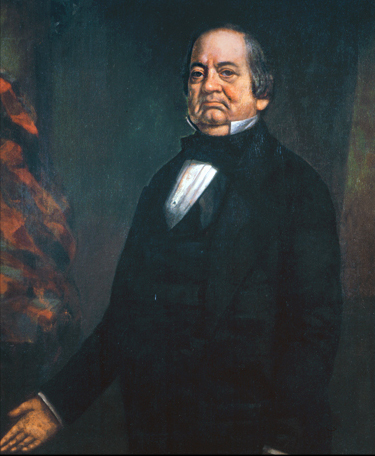
Former Governor Robert P. Letcher was unable to unseat Breckinridge in 1853.

The Whigs, seeking to recapture Breckinridge's seat, nominated Attorney General of Kentucky James Harlan, but some Whig factions opposed him, and he withdrew in March. Robert P. Letcher, a former congressman and governor who had won 14 elections in Kentucky without a loss, was the party's second choice. Both candidates campaigned vigorously throughout the Eighth District, making multiple speeches a day between May and August. Letcher was an experienced campaigner, but his popular, anecdote-filled oratory was unpolished, and he was prone to outbursts of anger when frustrated. By contrast, Breckinridge delivered calm, well-reasoned speeches. Cassius Clay, a political enemy of Letcher's for years, endorsed Breckinridge, despite their differences on slavery. Citing this endorsement and the abolitionism of Breckinridge's uncles, Letcher tried to paint Breckinridge as an enemy of slavery. Breckinridge pointed to his consistent support for slavery and claimed Letcher was actually hostile to the interests of slaveholders. Although the district had gone for Whig candidate Winfield Scott by over 600 votes in the previous year's presidential election, Breckinridge defeated Letcher by 526 votes. Once again, he received a large margin in Owen County, which reported 123 more votes than eligible voters living in the county. Grateful for the support of the reliably Democratic county, he gave his son John Witherspoon Breckinridge the nickname "Owen".

Of the 234 members of the House, Breckinridge was among the 80 who were returned to their seats for the Thirty-third Congress. Due to his increased seniority, he was assigned to the more prestigious Ways and Means Committee, but he was not given a committee chairmanship as many had expected. Although he supported Pierce's pro-slavery agenda on the principle of states' rights and believed that secession was legal, he opposed secession as a remedy to the country's immediate problems. This, coupled with his earlier support of manumission and African colonization, balanced his support for slavery; most still considered him a moderate legislator.

An ally of Illinois' Stephen A. Douglas, Breckinridge supported the doctrine of popular sovereignty as expressed in Douglas's Kansas–Nebraska Act. He believed passage of the act would remove the issue of slavery from national politics – although it ultimately had the opposite effect – and acted as a liaison between Douglas and Pierce to secure its passage. During the debate on the House floor, New York's Francis B. Cutting, incensed by a statement that Breckinridge had made, demanded that he explain or retract it. Breckinridge interpreted Cutting's demand as a challenge to duel. Under code duello, the individual being challenged retained the right to name the weapons used and the distance between the combatants; Breckinridge chose rifles at 60 paces. He also specified that the duel should be held at Silver Spring, Maryland, the home of his friend Francis Preston Blair. Cutting, who had not intended his initial remark as a challenge, believed that Breckinridge's naming of terms constituted a challenge; he chose to use pistols at a distance of 10 paces. While the two men attempted to clarify who had issued the challenge and who reserved the right to choose the terms, mutual friends resolved the issue, preventing the duel. The recently adopted Kentucky Constitution prevented anyone who participated in a duel from holding elected office, and the peaceful resolution of the issue may have saved Breckinridge's political career.

==== Retirement from the House ====
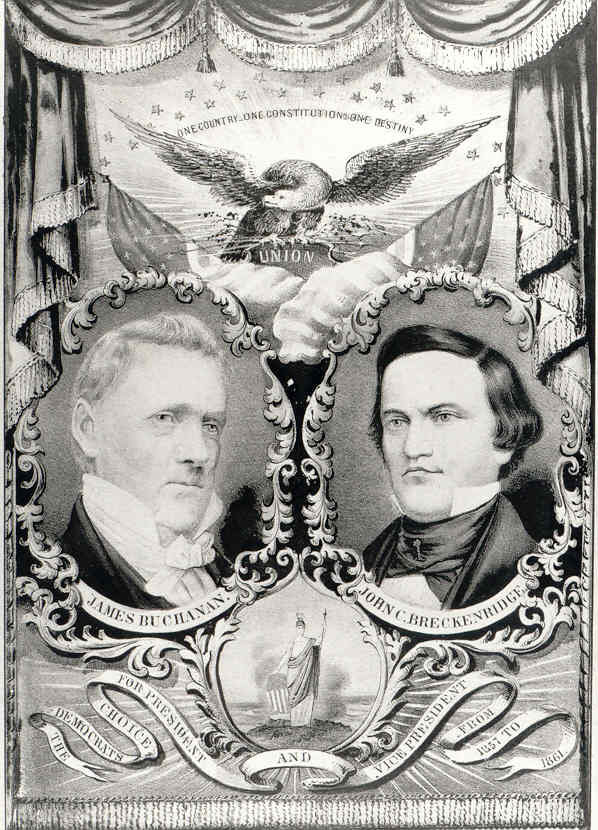
A campaign poster for Buchanan and Breckinridge

In February 1854, the Whig majority in the Kentucky General Assembly passed – over Powell's veto – a reapportionment bill that redrew Breckinridge's district, removing Owen County and replacing it with Harrison and Nicholas Counties. This, combined with the rise of the Know Nothing Party in Kentucky, left Breckinridge with little hope of re-election, and he decided to retire from the House at the expiration of his term. Following the December 1854 resignation of Pierre Soulé, the U.S. Minister to Spain, who failed to negotiate a U.S. annexation of Cuba following the controversial Ostend Manifesto, Pierce nominated Breckinridge to the position. Although the Senate confirmed the nomination, Breckinridge declined it on February 8, 1855, telling Pierce only that his decision was "of a private and domestic nature." His term in the house expired on March 4.

Desiring to care for his sick wife and rebuild his personal wealth, Breckinridge returned to his law practice in Lexington. In addition to his legal practice, he engaged in land speculation in Minnesota territory and Wisconsin. When Governor Willis A. Gorman of the Minnesota Territory thwarted an attempt by Breckinridge's fellow investors (not including Breckinridge) to secure approval of a railroad connecting Dubuque, Iowa, with their investments near Superior, Wisconsin, they petitioned Pierce to remove Gorman and appoint Breckinridge in his place. In 1855, Pierce authorized two successive investigations of Gorman, but failed to uncover any wrongdoing that would justify his removal. During his time away from politics, Breckinridge also promoted the advancement of horse racing in his native state and was chosen president of the Kentucky Association for the Improvement of the Breed of Horses.

=== Vice presidency (1857–1861) ===
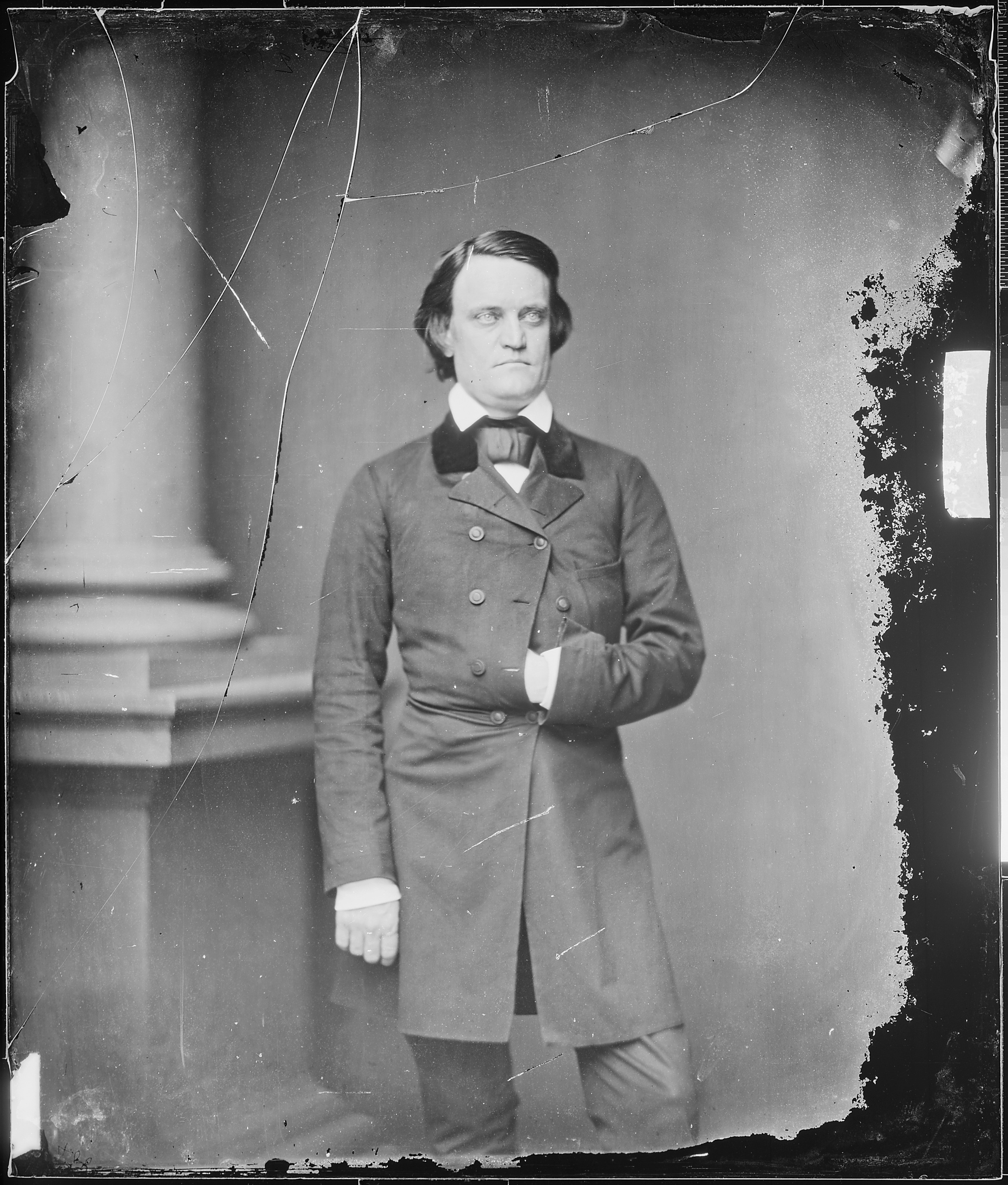
Breckinridge, photograph by Mathew Brady

As a delegate to the 1856 Democratic National Convention in Cincinnati, Ohio, Breckinridge favored Pierce's renomination for president. When Pierce's hopes of securing the nomination faltered, Breckinridge joined other erstwhile Pierce backers by throwing his support behind his friend, Stephen Douglas. Even with this additional support, Douglas was still unable to garner two third's majority of the delegates' votes, and he withdrew, leaving James Buchanan as the Democratic presidential nominee. William Alexander Richardson, a Kentucky-born Representative from Illinois, then suggested that nominating Breckinridge for vice president would balance Buchanan's ticket and placate disgruntled supporters of Douglas or Pierce. A delegate from Louisiana placed his name before the convention, and although Breckinridge desired the vice presidential nomination, he declined, citing his deference to fellow Kentuckian and former House Speaker Linn Boyd, who was supported by the Kentucky delegation.

Ten men received votes on the first vice-presidential ballot. Mississippi's John A. Quitman had the most support with 59 votes. Eight state delegations – with a total of 55 votes – voted for Breckinridge in spite of his refusal of the nomination, making him the second-highest vote getter. Kentucky cast its 12 votes for Boyd, bringing his third-place total to 33 votes. Seeing Breckinridge's strength on the first ballot, large numbers of delegates voted for him on the second ballot, and those who did not soon saw that his nomination was inevitable and changed their votes to make it unanimous.

Unlike many political nominees of his time, Breckinridge actively campaigned for Buchanan and his election. During the first 10 days of September 1856, he spoke in Hamilton and Cincinnati, Ohio; Lafayette and Indianapolis, Indiana; Kalamazoo, Michigan; Covington, Kentucky; and Pittsburgh, Pennsylvania. His speeches stressed the idea that Republicans were fanatically devoted to emancipation, and their election would prompt the dissolution of the Union. Breckinridge's presence on the ticket helped the Democrats carry his home state of Kentucky, which the party had not won since 1828, by 6,000 votes. Buchanan and Breckinridge received 174 electoral votes to 114 for Republicans John C. Frémont and William L. Dayton and eight for Know Nothing candidates Millard Fillmore and Andrew Jackson Donelson. Thirty-six years old at the time of his inauguration on March 4, 1857, Breckinridge was the youngest vice president in U.S. history, exceeding the minimum age required under the Constitution by only a year.

Buchanan resented that Breckinridge had supported both Pierce and Douglas before endorsing his nomination. Relations between the two were further strained when, upon asking for a private interview with Buchanan, Breckinridge was told to come to the White House and ask for Harriet Lane, who acted as the mansion's host for the unmarried president. Feeling slighted by the response, Breckinridge refused to carry out these instructions; later, three of Buchanan's intimates informed Breckinridge that requesting to speak to Miss Lane was actually a secret instruction to White House staff to usher the requestor into a private audience with the president. They also conveyed Buchanan's apologies for the misunderstanding.

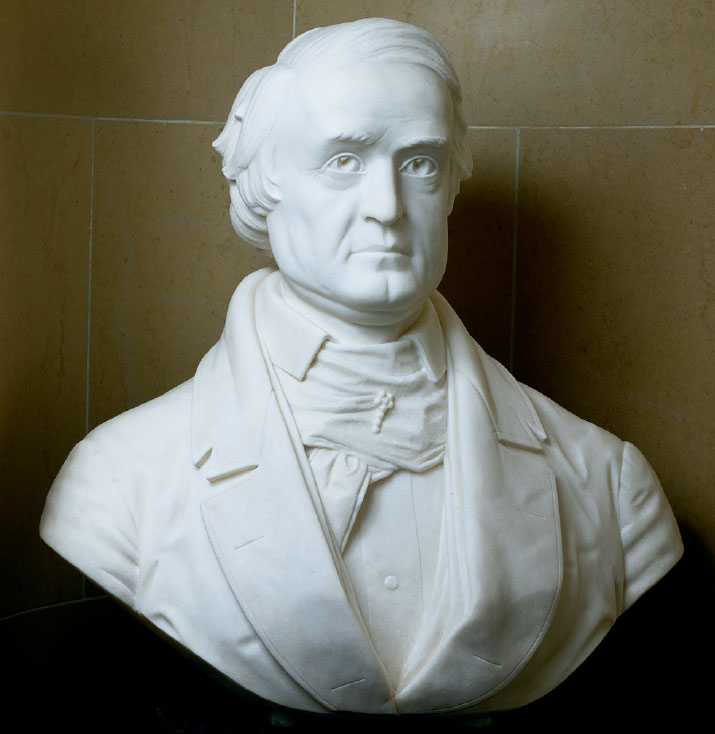
A marble bust of Breckinridge from the Senate's vice-presidential bust collection

Buchanan rarely consulted Breckinridge when making patronage appointments, and meetings between the two were infrequent. When Buchanan and Breckinridge endorsed the Lecompton Constitution, which would have admitted Kansas as a slave state instead of allowing the people to vote, they managed to alienate most Northern Democrats, including Douglas. This disagreement ended plans for Breckinridge, Douglas, and Minnesota's Henry Mower Rice to build a series of three elaborate, conjoined row houses in which to live during their time in Washington, DC. In November 1857, after Breckinridge found alternative lodging in Washington, he sold a slave woman and her young infant, which according to historian James C. Klotter, probably ended his days as a slaveholder. When Breckinridge did not travel to Illinois to campaign for Douglas's re-election to the Senate and gave him only a lukewarm endorsement, relations between them worsened.

Functioning as the Senate's presiding officer, Breckinridge's participation in the chamber's debates was also restricted, but he won respect for presiding "gracefully and impartially." On January 4, 1859, he was asked to deliver the final address in the Old Senate Chamber; in the speech, he expressed his desire that the Congress find a solution that would preserve the Union. During its half century in the chamber, the Senate had grown from 32 to 64 members. During those years, he observed, the Constitution had "survived peace and war, prosperity and adversity" to protect "the larger personal freedom compatible with public order." Breckinridge expressed hope that eventually "another Senate, in another age, shall bear to a new and larger Chamber, this Constitution vigorous and inviolate, and that the last generation of posterity shall witness the deliberations of the Representatives of American States, still united, prosperous, and free." Breckinridge then led a procession to the new chamber. Breckinridge opposed the idea that the federal government could coerce action by a state, but maintained that secession, while legal, was not the solution to the country's problems.

Although John Crittenden's Senate term did not expire until 1861, the Kentucky General Assembly met to choose his successor in 1859. Until just days before the election, the contest was expected to be between Breckinridge and Boyd, who had been elected lieutenant governor in August; Boyd's worsening health prompted his withdrawal on November 28, 1859. On December 12, the Assembly chose Breckinridge over Joshua Fry Bell, the defeated candidate in the August gubernatorial election, by a vote of 81–53. In his acceptance speech, delivered to the Kentucky House of Representatives on December 21, Breckinridge endorsed the Supreme Court's decision in Dred Scott v. Sandford, which ruled that Congress could not restrict slavery in the territories, and insisted that John Brown's recent raid on Harpers Ferry was evidence of Republicans' insistence on either "negro equality" or violence. Resistance in some form, he predicted, would eventually be necessary. He still urged the assembly against secession – "God forbid that the step shall ever be taken!" – but his discussion of growing sectional conflict bothered some, including his uncle Robert.

=== Presidential campaign of 1860 ===
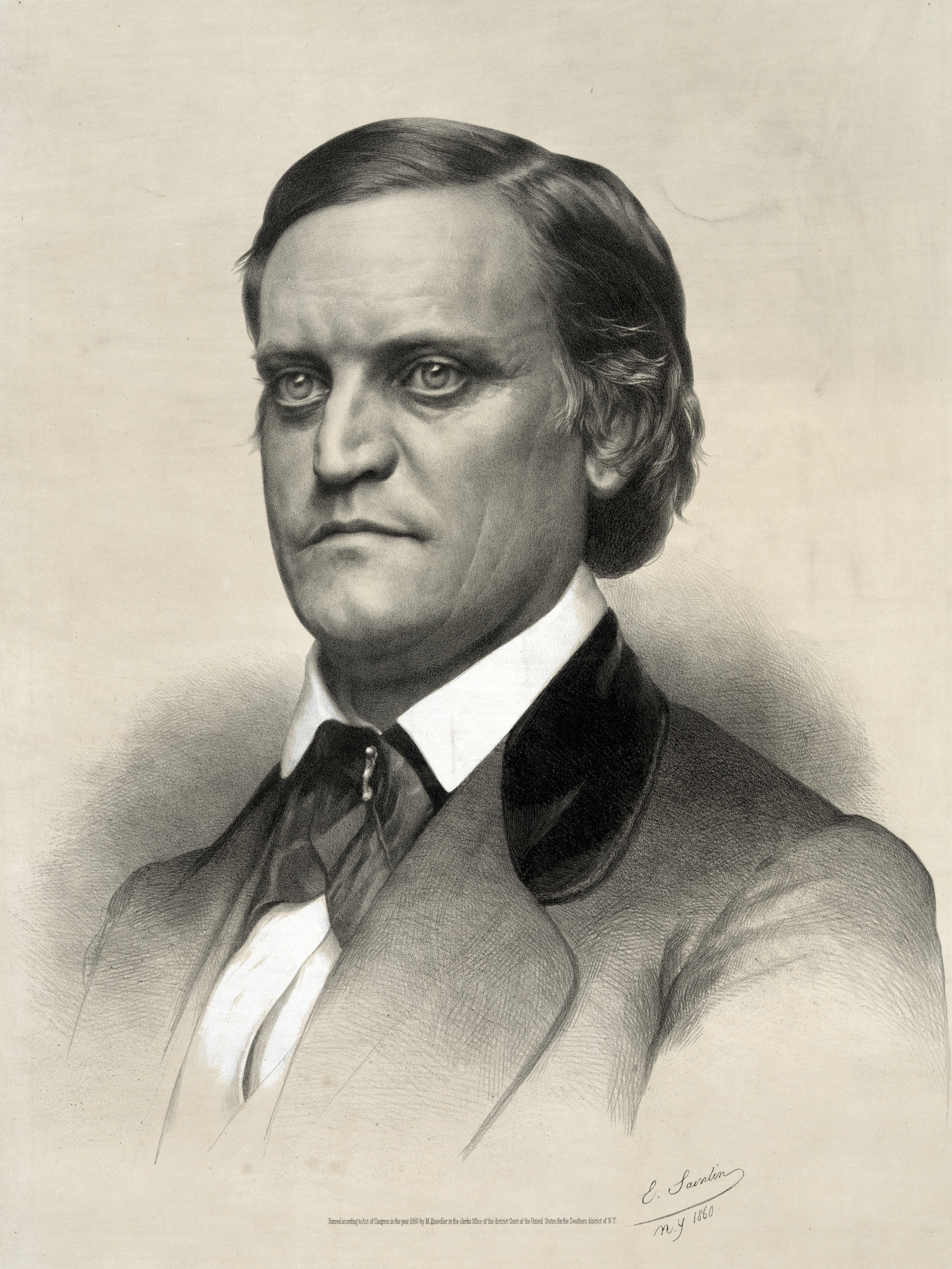
Breckinridge in 1860 by Jules-Émile Saintin

Early in 1859, Senator James Henry Hammond of South Carolina reported to a friend that Breckinridge was seeking the Democratic presidential nomination, but as late as January 1860, Breckinridge told family members that he had no desire for the nomination. A New York Times editorial noted that while Buchanan was falling "in prestige and political consequence, the star of the Vice President rises higher above the clouds." Douglas, considered the frontrunner for the Democratic presidential nomination, was convinced that Breckinridge would be a candidate; this, combined with Buchanan's reluctant support of Breckinridge and Breckinridge's public support for a federal slave code, deepened the rift between the two.

Among Breckinridge's supporters at the 1860 Democratic National Convention in Charleston, South Carolina, were several prominent Kentuckians. They were former Kentucky Governor and current Senator Lazarus W. Powell, former Kentucky Representative William Preston (a distant relative), law partner James Brown Clay, and James B. Beck. Breckinridge did not attend the convention, but instructed his supporters not to nominate him as long as James Guthrie remained a candidate. Accordingly, when a delegate from Arkansas nominated Breckinridge for president on the 36th ballot, Beck asked that it be withdrawn, and the request was honored. Over the course of 57 ballots, Douglas maintained a wide plurality, but failed to gain the necessary two-thirds majority; Guthrie consistently ran second. Unable to nominate a candidate, delegates voted to reconvene in Baltimore, Maryland, on June 18.

Pro-Southern delegates, who had walked out of the Charleston convention in protest of its failure to adopt a federal slave code plank in its platform, did not participate in the Baltimore convention. The delegates from Alabama and Louisiana – all of whom had walked out at Charleston – had been replaced, after five days of debate and holding votes on the issue, with Douglas supporters from those states, leading to the nomination of Douglas and Herschel Vespasian Johnson for president and vice president, respectively, on the sixth day. The protesting delegates convened on the same day in Baltimore. On the first ballot, Breckinridge received 81 votes, with 24 going to former senator Daniel S. Dickinson of New York. Dickinson supporters gradually changed their support to Breckinridge to make his nomination unanimous, and Joseph Lane of Oregon was chosen by acclamation as his vice presidential running mate. Despite concerns about the breakup of the party, Breckinridge accepted the presidential nomination. In August, Mississippi Senator Jefferson Davis attempted to broker a compromise under which Douglas, Breckinridge, and Tennessee's John Bell, the nominee of the Constitutional Union Party, would all withdraw in favor of a compromise candidate. Both Breckinridge and Bell readily agreed to the plan, but Douglas was opposed to compromising with the "Bolters", and his supporters retained an intense dislike for Breckinridge that made them averse to Davis's proposal.

Opponents knew Breckinridge believed in the right of secession and accused him of favoring the breakup of the Union; he denied the latter during a speech in Frankfort: "I am an American citizen, a Kentuckian who never did an act nor cherished a thought that was not full of devotion to the Constitution and the Union." While he had very little support in the northern states, most, if not all, of the southern states were expected to go for Breckinridge. This would give him only 120 of 303 electoral votes, but to gain support from any northern states, he had to minimize his connections with the southern states and risked losing their support to Bell. Some Breckinridge supporters believed his best hope was for the election to be thrown to the House of Representatives; if he could add the support of some Douglas or Bell states to the 13 believed to support him, he could beat Lincoln, who was believed to carry the support of 15 states. To Davis's wife, Varina, Breckinridge wrote, "I trust I have the courage to lead a forlorn hope."

States' electoral votes by candidate; Lincoln states are red, Breckinridge states are green, Bell states are orange, and Douglas states are blue

In the four-way contest, Breckinridge came in third in the popular vote, with 18.1%, but second in the Electoral College. The final electoral vote was 180 for Lincoln, 72 for Breckinridge, 39 for Bell, and 12 for Douglas. Although Breckinridge won the states of the Deep South, his support in those states came mostly from rural areas with low slave populations; the urban areas with higher slave populations generally went for Bell or Douglas. Breckinridge also carried the border states of Maryland and Delaware. Historian James C. Klotter points out in light of these results that, while Douglas maintained that there was "not a disunionist in America who is not a Breckinridge man", it is more likely that party loyalty and economic status played a more prominent role in Breckinridge's support than did issues of slavery and secession. He lost to Douglas in Missouri and Bell in Virginia and Tennessee. Bell also captured Breckinridge's home state, Kentucky. Lincoln swept most of the northern states, although New Jersey split its electoral votes, giving four to Lincoln and three to Douglas. As the candidate of the Buchanan faction, Breckinridge outpolled Douglas in Pennsylvania and received support comparable to Douglas in Connecticut, although he received very little support elsewhere in the North. It was Breckinridge's duty as vice president to announce Lincoln as the winner of the electoral college vote on February 13, 1861.

On February 24, Breckinridge visited Lincoln at Willard's Hotel in Washington, DC, and frequently thereafter he visited his step-cousin, now the First Lady, at the White House. In the lame duck session following the election, Congress adopted a resolution authored by Lazarus Powell, now in the Senate, calling for a committee of thirteen (Committee of Thirteen on the Disturbed Condition of the Country) "to consider that portion of the President's message relating to the disturbances of the country." Frank Heck wrote that Breckinridge appointed "an able committee, representing every major faction." He endorsed Crittenden's proposed compromise, a collection of constitutional amendments designed to avert secession and appease the South. Breckinridge used his influence as the Senate's presiding officer in an unsuccessful attempt to get it approved by either the committee or the Senate. Ultimately, the committee reported that they were unable to agree on a recommendation. On March 4, 1861, the last day of the session, Breckinridge swore in Hannibal Hamlin as his successor as vice president. Hamlin, in turn, swore in the newly elected senators, including Breckinridge.

=== U.S. Senator ===
Seven states had already seceded when Breckinridge took his seat as a senator, leaving the remaining Southern senators more outnumbered in their defense of slavery. Seeking to find a compromise that would reunite the states under constitutional principles, he urged Lincoln to withdraw federal forces from the Confederate states to avert war. The congressional session ended on March 28, and in an April 2 address to the Kentucky General Assembly, he continued to advocate peaceful reconciliation of the states and proposed a conference of border states to seek a solution. On April 12, Confederate troops fired on Fort Sumter, ending plans for the conference. Breckinridge recommended that Governor Beriah Magoffin call a sovereignty convention to determine whether Kentucky would side with the Union or the Confederacy. On May 10, he was chosen by the legislature as one of six delegates to a conference to decide the state's next action. The states' rights delegates were Breckinridge, Magoffin, and Richard Hawes; the Unionist delegates were Crittenden, Archibald Dixon, and S.S. Nicholas. Unable to agree on substantial issues, the delegates recommended that Kentucky adopt a neutral stance in the Civil War and arm itself to prevent invasion by either federal or Confederate forces. Breckinridge did not support this recommendation, but he agreed to abide by it once it was approved by the legislature.

In special elections in June, pro-Union candidates captured 9 of 10 seats in Kentucky's House delegation. Returning to the Senate for a special session in July, Breckinridge was regarded as a traitor by most of his fellow legislators because of his Confederate sympathies. He condemned as unconstitutional Lincoln's enlistment and arming of men for a war Congress had not officially declared, his expending funds for the war that had not been allocated by Congress, and his suspension of the writ of habeas corpus. He was the only senator to vote against a resolution authorizing Lincoln to use "the entire resources of the government" for the war. Asked what he would do if he were president, he replied, "I would prefer to see these States all reunited upon true constitutional principles to any other object that could be offered me in life. But I infinitely prefer to see a peaceful separation of these States than to see endless, aimless, devastating war, at the end of which I see the grave of public liberty and of personal freedom." On August 1, he declared that, if Kentucky sided with the federal government against the Confederacy, "she will be represented by some other man on the floor of this Senate."

Kentucky's neutrality was breached by both federal and Confederate forces in early September 1861 (the Federal forces maintained that there had been no breach, as Kentucky was an integral part of the Union). Confederate forces invaded Kentucky on September 3; they were followed by a Union force commanded by Brigadier General Ulysses S. Grant, which on the morning of September 6 occupied the town of Paducah on the Ohio River. Soon after, Unionists in the state arrested former governor Charles S. Morehead for his suspected Confederate sympathies and shut down the Louisville Courier because of its pro-Confederate editorials. Word reached Breckinridge that Union General Thomas E. Bramlette intended to arrest him next. To avoid detainment, on September 19, 1861, he left Lexington. Joined in Prestonsburg by Confederate sympathizers George W. Johnson, George Baird Hodge, William Preston, and William E. Simms, he continued to Abingdon, Virginia, and from there by rail to Confederate-held Bowling Green, Kentucky. The state legislature immediately requested his resignation.

In an open letter to his constituents dated October 8, 1861, Breckinridge maintained that the Union no longer existed and that Kentucky should be free to choose her own course; he defended his sympathy to the Southern cause and denounced the Unionist state legislature, declaring, "I exchange with proud satisfaction a term of six years in the Senate of the United States for the musket of a soldier." He was indicted for treason in U.S. federal district court in Frankfort on November 6, 1861, having officially enlisted in the Confederate army days earlier. On December 2, 1861, he was declared a traitor by the U.S. Senate. A resolution stating "Whereas John C. Breckinridge, a member of this body from the State of Kentucky, has joined the enemies of his country, and is now in arms against the government he had sworn to support: Therefore—Resolved, That said John C. Breckinridge, the traitor, be, and he hereby is, expelled from the Senate," was adopted by a vote of 36–0 on December 4. Ten Southern Senators had been expelled earlier that year in July.

== American Civil War ==
=== Service in the Western Theater ===
On the recommendation of Simon Bolivar Buckner, the former commander of the Kentucky State Militia who had also joined the Confederate Army, Breckinridge was commissioned as a brigadier general on November 2, 1861. On November 16, he was given command of the 1st Kentucky Brigade. Nicknamed the Orphan Brigade because its men felt orphaned by Kentucky's Unionist state government, the brigade was in Buckner's 2nd Division of the Army of Mississippi, commanded by General Albert Sidney Johnston. For several weeks, he trained his troops in the city, and he also participated in the organization of a provisional Confederate government for the state. Although not sanctioned by the legislature in Frankfort, its existence prompted the Confederacy to admit Kentucky on December 10, 1861.

Johnston's forces were forced to withdraw from Bowling Green in February 1862. During the retreat, Breckinridge was put in charge of Johnston's Reserve Corps. Johnston decided to attack Ulysses S. Grant's forces at Shiloh, Tennessee on April 6, 1862, by advancing North from his base in Corinth, Mississippi. Breckinridge's reserves soon joined the Battle of Shiloh as Johnston tried to force Grant's troops into the river. Despite Johnston being killed in the fighting, the Confederates made steady progress against Grant's troops until P. G. T. Beauregard – who assumed command after Johnston's death – ordered his generals to break off the fighting at about 6 o'clock in the afternoon. The next day, the Union forces regrouped and repelled the Confederates. Breckinridge's division formed the Confederate rearguard, stationing itself on the ground that the Confederates held the night before the first day of the battle while the rest of the army retreated. Union troops did not pursue them. Of the 7,000 troops under Breckinridge's command at the battle, 386 were killed and 1,628 were wounded, Breckinridge among the latter.

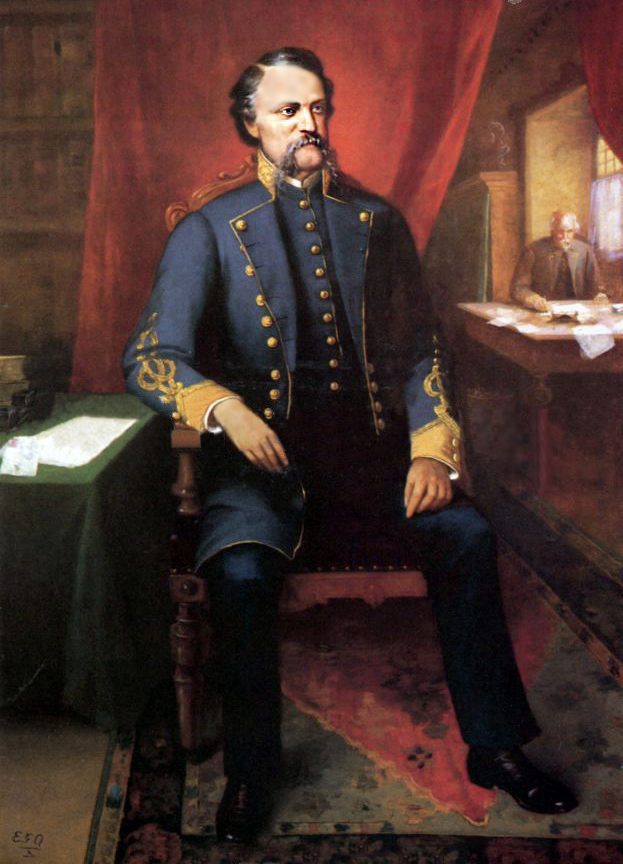
John C. Breckinridge by Eliphalet Frazer Andrews

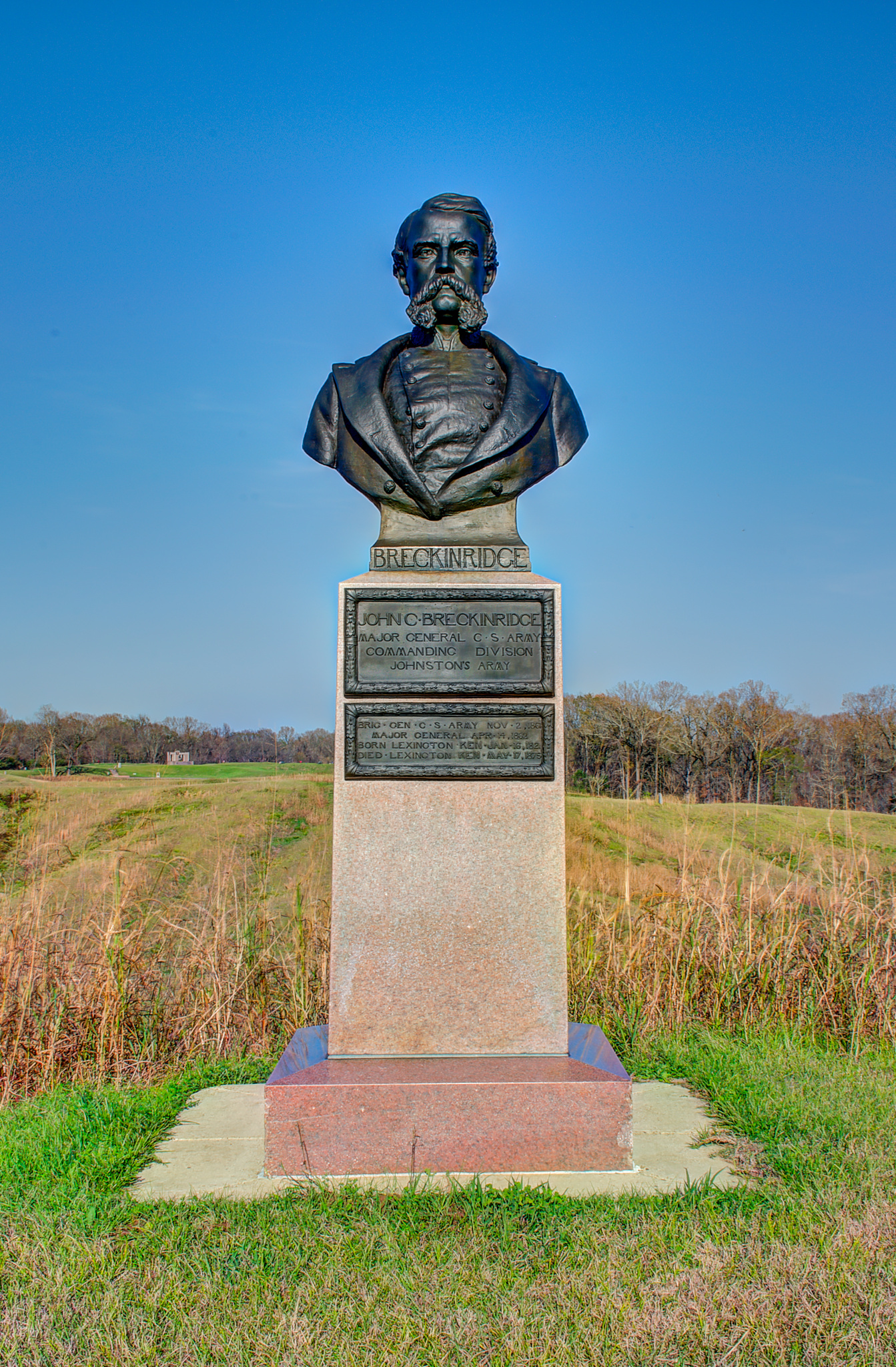
Bust of Breckinridge by T.A.R. Kitson, Vicksburg National Military Park

Breckinridge's performance earned him a promotion to major general on April 14, 1862. After his promotion, he joined Earl Van Dorn near Vicksburg, Mississippi. The Confederate forces awaited a Union attack throughout most of July. Finally, Van Dorn ordered Breckinridge to attempt to recapture Baton Rouge, Louisiana, from federal forces. Despite having his forces reduced to around 3,000 by illness and desertions, on the morning of August 5, he attacked the Union garrison, capturing several prisoners, destroying its supplies, and driving it from the city. Union troops were forced to take shelter under cover of their gunboats. The ironclad CSS Arkansas was intended to support Breckinridge's attack by moving down the Red River, but it was immobilized by a mechanical failure and its crew set it on fire before letting it loose downriver to threaten oncoming Union vessels and to prevent its capture. Without naval support, the Confederates were unable to hold the city. Breckinridge withdrew his troops at 10 o'clock.

Later that month, Breckinridge served as an independent commander in the lower Mississippi Valley, securing Confederate control of the area by taking Port Hudson, which helped halt the federal advance down the Mississippi River. Meanwhile, General Braxton Bragg, commanding the Army of Mississippi, was preparing an invasion of Kentucky, and Breckinridge was ordered to join him. Confederate leaders believed that Breckinridge's presence in the state could spur enlistments. Van Dorn was reluctant to lose command of Breckinridge and his men, and by the time he relented on October 15, Bragg was already retreating from the state after being defeated at the Battle of Perryville. Breckinridge and his division of 7,000 men met Bragg at Murfreesboro, Tennessee. With Kentucky solidly under Union control, Breckinridge's wife and children moved south and followed his troops as closely as was safely possible.

Bragg resented Breckinridge's close ties to Confederate commanders, particularly Joseph E. Johnston, Wade Hampton, John B. Floyd, and William Preston, all of whom were related to Breckinridge. Furthermore, he thought Breckinridge's late arrival for the Kentucky campaign had contributed to the lack of Confederate volunteers he found in the state. In December, Bragg ordered the execution of Kentucky Corporal Asa Lewis after a court martial had convicted him of desertion. Lewis's enlistment had expired, but he continued to serve with the 6th Kentucky Infantry Regiment until his impoverished mother and siblings begged him to return home. Although Lewis claimed he was returning to the army at the time of his arrest, Bragg was insistent on reducing desertions by making him an example. After witnessing the execution, Breckinridge reportedly became nauseated and fell forward on his horse, requiring assistance from members of his staff. He protested Bragg's "military murder" and was barely able to prevent open mutiny by his Kentucky soldiers. Relations between Breckinridge and Bragg continued to deteriorate; Breckinridge's opinion that Bragg was incompetent was shared by many Confederate officers.

At Murfreesboro, Breckinridge's Division was assigned to Lieutenant General William J. Hardee's Corps and was stationed on the east side of the Stones River. When the Union Army of the Cumberland, commanded by Major General William Rosecrans, attacked on December 31, 1862, beginning the Battle of Stones River, Bragg's main force initially repelled the attack. Bragg ordered Breckinridge to reinforce him on the west side of the river, but Brigadier General John Pegram, who commanded a cavalry brigade, erroneously reported that a large Union force was advancing along the east bank, and Breckinridge was slow to comply with Bragg's order. When he finally crossed the river, his attacks were ineffective, and Bragg ordered him back across the river. On January 2, a Union division under Brigadier General Horatio P. Van Cleve crossed the river and took a ridge. The position endangered Leonidas Polk's corps, which was positioned ahead of the rest of the Confederate lines in the center of the battlefield. Against Breckinridge's advice, Bragg ordered his division to launch a frontal attack on the federal position. Prior to the attack, Breckinridge wrote to Preston, "if [the attack] should result in disaster and I be among the killed, I want you to do justice to my memory and tell the people that I believed this attack to be very unwise and tried to prevent it."

Launching their attack at 4 P.M., Breckinridge's men initially broke the Union line and forced them across the river. Artillery on the opposite side of the river then opened fire on Breckinridge's men, and a fresh Union division under Brigadier General James S. Negley arrived to reinforce the fleeing troops. In just over an hour, nearly one-third of Breckinridge's troops were killed, wounded, or captured. One anecdote holds that, as he rode among the survivors, he cried out repeatedly, "My poor Orphans! My poor Orphans," bringing recognition to the Orphan Brigade. Bragg's official report criticized the conduct of Breckinridge's division and assigned to Breckinridge most of the blame for the Confederate defeat. Breckinridge asserted to his superiors that Bragg's report "fails to do justice to the behavior of my Division"; he requested a court of inquiry, but the request was denied. Several Kentuckians under Breckinridge's command, who already blamed Bragg for the failed invasion of their native state, encouraged him to resign his commission and challenge Bragg to a duel.

In May 1863, Breckinridge was reassigned to Joseph E. Johnston, participating in the Battle of Jackson in an unsuccessful attempt to break the siege of Vicksburg. Vicksburg fell to Grant's forces on July 4, and Breckinridge was returned to Bragg's command on August 28, 1863. After seeing no action on the first day of the Battle of Chickamauga in Georgia on September 19, he led a division of D.H. Hill's corps in an attack on the Union forces the next morning. The Confederate troops succeeded in breaking the Union line, but the main army escaped back to Tennessee. Of Breckinridge's 3,769 men, 166 were killed in the battle; 909 were wounded and 165 were missing.

In late November, Breckinridge commanded one of Bragg's two corps during the Confederate defeat at the Battles for Chattanooga. Bragg ordered a significant number of Breckinridge's men to reinforce Hardee's corps, leaving him with insufficient forces to repel the combined attack of Joseph Hooker and George Henry Thomas on Missionary Ridge. His son, Cabell, was captured in the battle. He was later freed in a prisoner exchange. In his official report, Bragg charged Breckinridge with drunkenness at Chattanooga and (retroactively) at Stones River. Historian Lowell H. Harrison noted that, while Breckinridge frequently drank whiskey, he was well known for being able to consume large amounts without getting drunk. Before submitting his own resignation, which was accepted, Bragg removed Breckinridge from command. It would be almost two years – on May 1, 1865 – before the two would reconcile.

=== Service in the Eastern Theater ===
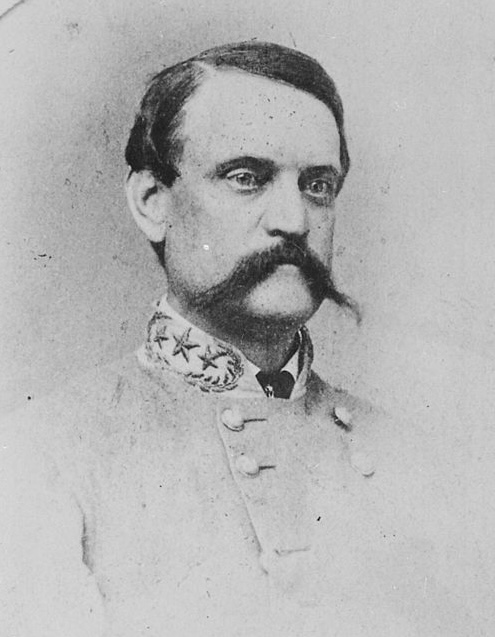
Breckinridge as a Confederate general

On December 15, 1863, Breckinridge took leave in Richmond. Premature rumors of his death prompted The New York Times to print a quite vituperative obituary suggesting that Breckinridge had been a hypocrite for supporting states' rights, then abandoning his home state when it chose to remain in the Union. Confederate leaders were skeptical of Bragg's claims against Breckinridge, and in February 1864, Confederate President Jefferson Davis assigned him to the Eastern Theater and put him in charge of the Trans-Allegheny Department (later known as the Department of East Tennessee and West Virginia).

On May 5, General Robert E. Lee, commander of the Army of Northern Virginia, ordered Breckinridge to take command of a reconnaissance mission to scout the federal forces under Franz Sigel near Winchester, Virginia as part of the Lynchburg Campaign. With a force of about 4,800 men, including 261 cadets from the Virginia Military Institute, he defeated Sigel's 6,300 men at the Battle of New Market on May 15, driving them west across the Shenandoah River. In doing so, Breckinridge's troops protected Lee's flank, defended a crucial railroad junction, and protected the valuable wheat supply. Lee had suggested that Breckinridge invade Maryland, but he was unable to do so because floodwaters had made the Potomac River virtually impassable. The victory was considered one of his best performances as a general. Since then, many in the South have viewed him as a "worthy successor" of the late Stonewall Jackson. Breckinridge would draw more comparisons at the Second Battle of Kernstown, the scene of the first fight in Jackson's Valley Campaign two years earlier. In the Second Battle, which occurred on July 24, 13,000 Confederate troops commanded by Lt. Gen. Jubal Early attacked and defeated 10,000 Federal troops under the command of Brig. Gen. George Crook. The victory allowed the Confederates to resume their invasion of the North. Shortly thereafter, Breckinridge's Division reinforced Lee's Army of Northern Virginia and played an important role in halting Grant's advance at the Battle of Cold Harbor. During the battle, his troops repulsed a powerful Union attack. Breckinridge was wounded when a cannonball struck his horse and he was pinned underneath. He was still unable to walk or ride when Lee ordered him to take command of the survivors of the Confederate defeat at the Battle of Piedmont. Traveling by rail to Rockfish Gap on June 10, he marched his forces into the city of Lynchburg, Virginia. He was joined there by General Early's troops, who arrived just in time to save the Confederate forces from an assault by Union forces under David Hunter at the Battle of Lynchburg.

After Early and Breckinridge (who was now able to ride a horse) chased Hunter more than sixty miles away from the city, Lee ordered them to clear the Union forces from the Shenandoah Valley, then cross into Maryland and probe the defenses of Washington, D.C. Union forces' only serious attempt to turn back the expedition came at the Battle of Monocacy on July 9. Confederate troops were delayed, but ultimately prevailed and continued toward Washington. They were defeated at the Battle of Fort Stevens on July 11–12, partially with reinforcements brought in by the United States Government with the time gained from the Battle of Monocacy. Since Lincoln was watching the fight from the ramparts of Fort Stevens, this marked the only time in American history in which two former opponents in a presidential election faced one another across battle lines. Following the battle, Early decided to withdraw rather than assault the well-fortified federal capital. Early and Breckinridge were able to hold the Shenandoah Valley through July and August, but on September 19, 1864, Philip Sheridan forced their retreat at the Third Battle of Winchester. Responding to General John Brown Gordon's admonition to be careful in the fight, Breckinridge responded, "Well, general, there is little left for me if our cause is to fail."

After the death of John Hunt Morgan, Breckinridge again took command of the Department of East Tennessee and West Virginia. He reorganized the department, which was in great disarray. On October 2, 1864, at the First Battle of Saltville, his troops were able to protect critical Confederate salt works from United States forces under Stephen G. Burbridge, despite a lack of resources. The next morning, he discovered that soldiers under his command had begun killing an estimated 45 to 100 wounded black Union soldiers of the 5th United States Colored Cavalry. Hearing the gunfire, he rushed to stop the massacre. Brigadier General Felix Huston Robertson was suspected of involvement and bragged about killing the negroes. General Lee instructed Breckinridge to "prefer charges against him and bring him to trial", but no trial ever took place.

In mid-November, Breckinridge led a raid into northeastern Tennessee, driving Alvan Cullem Gillem's forces back to Knoxville at the Battle of Bull's Gap. On December 17–18, he faced a two-pronged attack from Union cavalry under Major General George Stoneman at the Battle of Marion in Virginia. Badly outnumbered on either flank, Breckinridge resisted Stoneman's forces until he ran low on ammunition. Stoneman's forces were able to damage Confederate salt works, lead mines, and railroads in the area, and destroy supply depots at Bristol and Abingdon. Finally restocked with ammunition after three days, Breckinridge was able to drive Stoneman – whose men were now short of ammunition themselves – out of the area.

=== Confederate Secretary of War ===
James A. Seddon resigned his position as the Confederate Secretary of War on January 19, 1865. On February 6, Davis appointed Breckinridge to the vacant position, partially to quiet growing opposition to his administration. Initially opposed by several members of the Confederate Congress because he had waited to join the Confederacy, he eventually gained their support by administering his office more efficiently than his predecessors. With their support, he was able to expand the post's influence to include making officer assignments and promotion recommendations and advising field generals regarding strategy. His first act as secretary was to promote Robert E. Lee to general-in-chief of all Confederate forces. After Lee reported a critical shortage of food, clothing, and supplies among his troops, Breckinridge recommended the removal of Lucius B. Northrop, the Confederate commissary general. Northrop's successor, Isaac M. St. John, improved the flow of supplies to troops in the field.

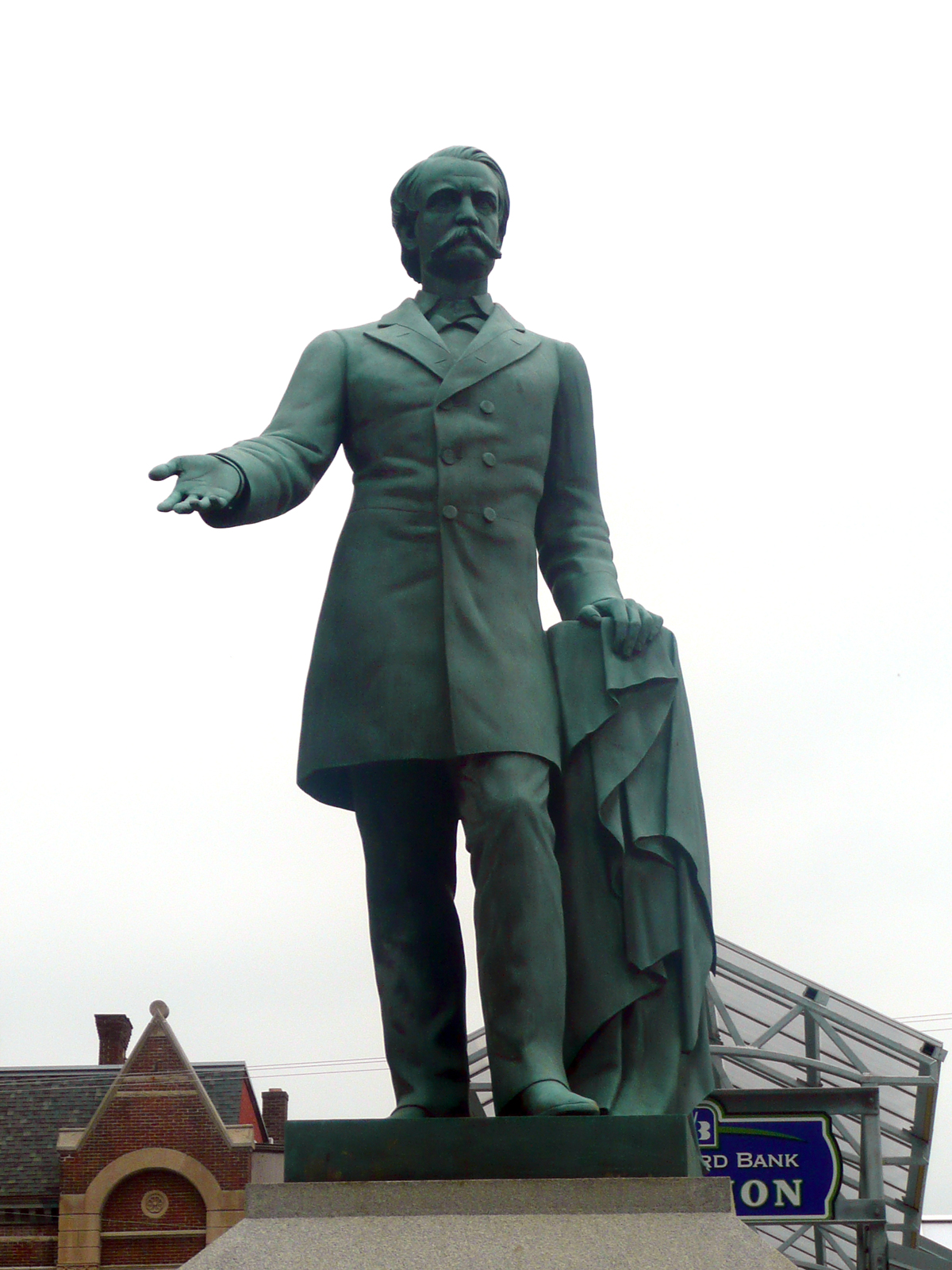
Breckinridge's statue formerly located at Cheapside Park in downtown Lexington

By late February, Breckinridge concluded that the Confederate cause was hopeless. Delegating the day-to-day operations of his office to his assistant, John Archibald Campbell, he began laying the groundwork for surrender. Davis desired to continue the fight, but Breckinridge urged, "This has been a magnificent epic. In God's name let it not terminate in farce." On April 2, Lee sent a telegram to Breckinridge informing him that he would have to withdraw from his position that night, and that this would necessitate the evacuation of Richmond. Ordering Campbell to organize the flight of the Confederate cabinet to Danville, Virginia, Breckinridge remained in the city to oversee the destruction of facilities and supplies to prevent their use by the invading federal forces. However, he did not destroy Confederate archives and records, which were preserved for history. Upon his exit from the city, he ordered that the bridges over the James River be burned. His son Clifton, then serving in the Confederate Navy at Richmond, resigned his post and joined his father as he moved southward to meet Davis.

After overseeing the transfer of Richmond, Breckinridge joined Lee's forces at Farmville, Virginia, on the night of April 5 and remained there until April 7. He continued on to Danville, arriving on April 11 to discover that Lee had surrendered on April 9 and the Confederate cabinet had already fled to Greensboro, North Carolina. Arriving in Greensboro on April 13, he advised the cabinet that the remaining Confederate armies should be surrendered; only Davis and Secretary of State Judah P. Benjamin disagreed. At Bennett Place, he assisted Joseph E. Johnston in his surrender negotiations with Major General William Tecumseh Sherman. Sherman later praised Breckinridge's negotiating skills, and the surrender terms agreed to were later rejected by Washington as too generous, forcing Sherman to offer the same terms as Grant had at Appomattox, which were accepted.

On April 18, Breckinridge heard from Sherman and Johnston of the assassination of Abraham Lincoln four days earlier; the President had died in the Petersen House, where Breckinridge briefly resided in late 1852 as a U.S. representative. The Kentuckian was visibly devastated. Eyewitness accounts recall him to have said, "Gentlemen, the South has lost its best friend."

Breckinridge rode into Abbeville, South Carolina, on the morning of April 28. While there, Breckinridge and Brigadier General Basil W. Duke convinced Davis that continuing the war was hopeless. Breckinridge was put in charge of the $150,000 in gold specie remaining in the Confederate treasury; traveling southward by rail toward Washington, Georgia, a group of soldiers in his military escort – unpaid for months – threatened to divide the gold among themselves before it could be captured by federal troops. Breckinridge convinced them to abandon their scheme after paying them their wages from the treasury, but some of them refused to escort Breckinridge and the bullion any further. Breckinridge's party arrived in Washington on May 4 and, after paying out several requisitions from the treasury, deposited the rest in banks there. He also composed a letter to his remaining deputies in which he disbanded the War Department.

== Escape and exile ==
On May 5, the same day that Jefferson Davis officially dissolved the Confederate Government, Breckinridge discharged most of the men escorting him, retaining only a small contingent of Kentuckians under the command of his cousin, William Campbell Preston Breckinridge. Feeling honor-bound to protect Davis, he attempted to create a diversion that would allow him to escape. The next day, his party encountered a large Federal force; while his cousin negotiated with the force's commander, Breckinridge and a small detachment escaped. Riding southward across Georgia, they reached Milltown (now Lakeland) by May 11 and remained there for a few days. Learning of Davis's capture, he left Milltown with only a military aide, a personal servant, and his son Cabell. On May 15, 1865, in Madison, Florida, he was joined by fellow fugitive John Taylor Wood, who had been a captain in the Confederate Navy. Breckinridge and Wood decided to flee to the Bahamas, but because Cabell was allergic to mosquitoes, Breckinridge told him to surrender to the nearest federal officer.

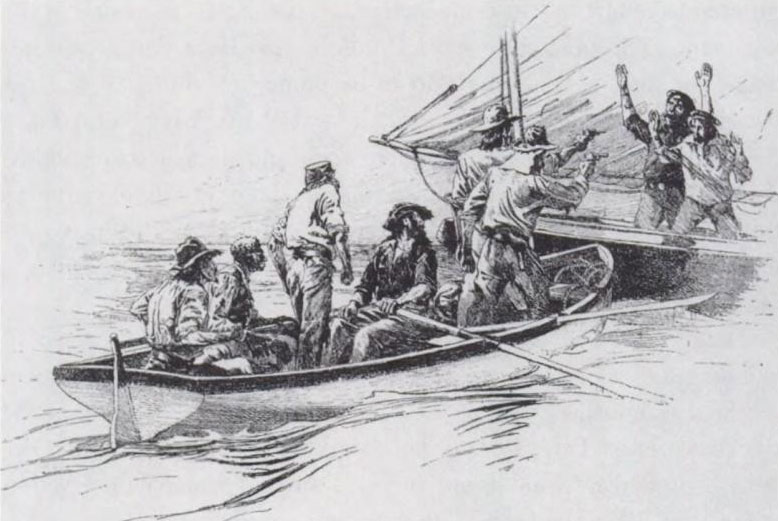
Breckinridge's party hijacking a larger boat

At Gainesville, Florida, the group found Confederate Colonel John Jackson Dickison, who gave them a lifeboat he had taken from a captured federal gunboat. Traveling down the St. Johns River, they reached Fort Butler on May 29. From there, they continued on the St. Johns to Lake Harney, where the boat was loaded on a wagon and hauled about 12 miles (19 km) to Sand Point (today's Titusville) on the Indian River. They reached the river by May 31, but as they followed its course southward, they had to drag the boat across the river's mudflats and sandbars. They stopped at the John C. Houston place on Elbow Creek (Melbourne), where their boat was brought ashore and caulked. When the repairs were completed, Colonel John Taylor Wood, again led the party south. Transferring the boat to the Atlantic Ocean near Jupiter Inlet, they continued along the Florida coast and landed near present-day Palm Beach on June 4. Strong winds prevented them from navigating the small craft out to sea, so they continued southward down the coast.

On June 5, the party was spotted by a federal steamer, but convinced the crew they were hunters scavenging the coast. Two days later, they encountered a larger boat with a mast and rigging; chasing it down, they disarmed the occupants and hijacked the craft. As compensation, they gave their old boat and twenty dollars in gold to the owners of the larger craft, and returned some of their weapons after the exchange was complete. With this more seaworthy craft, they decided to flee to Cuba. Departing from Fort Dallas, they survived an encounter with pirates, two significant storms, and a dangerous lack of provisions before arriving in Cárdenas on June 11, 1865. A Kentuckian living in the city recognized Breckinridge, introduced him to the locals, and served as his interpreter. The refugees were given food and stayed the night in a local hotel. The next morning, they traveled by rail to Havana, where Breckinridge was offered a house. He declined the offer, choosing to travel with Charles J. Helm, a fellow Kentuckian who had been operating as a Confederate agent in the Caribbean, to Great Britain.

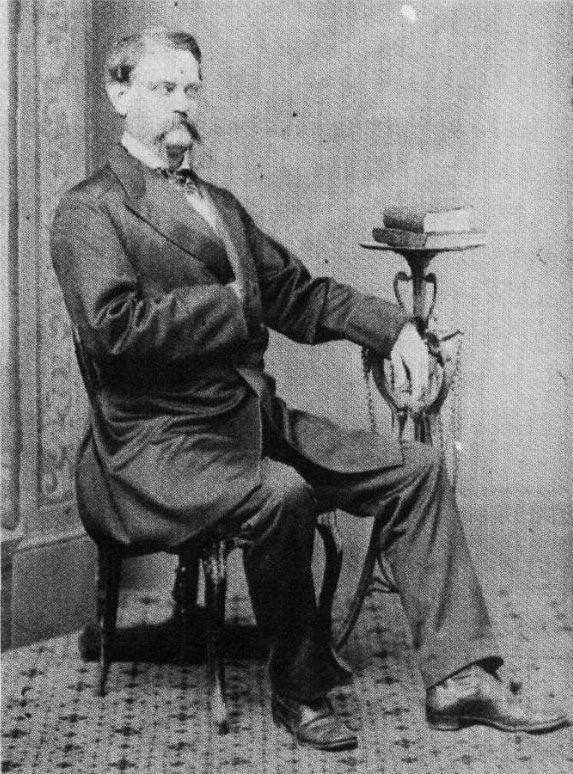
Breckinridge in exile in Paris

Arriving in Britain in late July, he consulted with former Confederate agents there and arranged communication with his wife, then in Canada. Re-crossing the Atlantic, he was reunited with his wife and all of his children except Clifton in Toronto on September 13, 1865. The family spent the winter there, living first in a hotel and then in a rented house. There were enough Confederate exiles in the city, according to Mrs. Breckinridge, "to form quite a pleasant society among ourselves". The family moved to Niagara in May. In August, doctors advised Breckinridge's wife that the climate of France might benefit her ailing health. Cabell Breckinridge returned to the U.S. to engage in business ventures with his brother Clifton, and Mary, just 12 years old, was sent to live with relatives in New York. The remainder of the family journeyed to Europe, where the children attended school in Paris, Versailles, and Vevey, Switzerland. From mid-1866 to early 1868, Breckinridge toured Europe and the Middle East – including visits to Germany, Austria, Turkey, Greece, Syria, Egypt, and the Holy Land; because of her poor health, his wife remained in France until February 1868, when she joined him in Naples. During their tour of Italy, Breckinridge met with Pope Pius IX in Rome, and also visited Pompeii.

Desiring to return to the U.S. but still fearing capture, Breckinridge moved his family back to Niagara in June 1868. He steadfastly refused to seek a pardon, although 70 members of the Kentucky General Assembly had requested one on his behalf from President Andrew Johnson on February 10, 1866. On January 8, 1868, the Louisville City Council instructed the state's congressional delegation to seek assurance that Breckinridge would not be prosecuted on his return. James Beck, Breckinridge's old law partner, was then in Congress and wrote to him on December 11, 1868, that it appeared likely that Johnson would issue a general pardon for all former Confederates; he advised Breckinridge to return to the U.S. before the pardon was issued because he feared it might only apply to those in the country.

== Return to the U.S. and death ==
Johnson proclaimed amnesty for all former Confederates on December 25, 1868. Still in Canada, Breckinridge lingered for a few weeks to receive assurance that it still applied to him even though he had not been in the U.S. when it was issued. Departing Canada on February 10, 1869, he made several stops to visit family and friends, arriving in Lexington on March 9. Although he resided in Kentucky for the rest of his life, he never bought a home there after the war, living first in hotels and then renting a home on West Second Street.

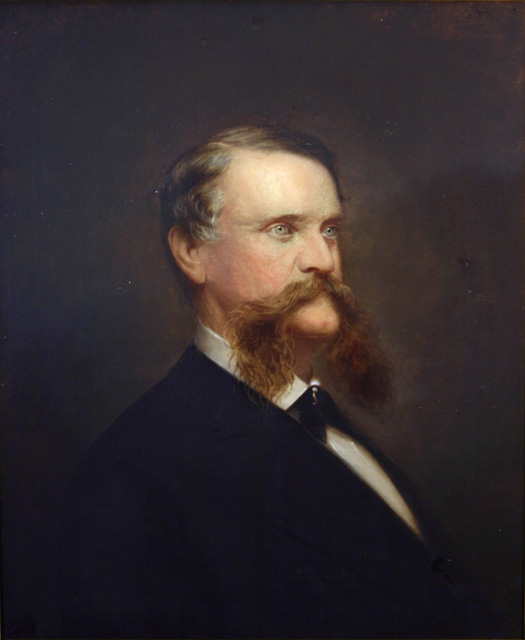
Breckinridge after the war

Many insurance companies in the south asked Breckinridge to join them. In August 1868, he became manager of the Kentucky branch of Virginia's Piedmont Life Insurance Company (which soon became the Piedmont and Arlington Insurance Company). Washington College (now Washington and Lee University) offered him a professorship. He was urged to accept by former Confederate Colonel William Preston Johnston, who was already a faculty member, but Breckinridge declined. He resumed his law practice, taking as a partner Robert A. Thornton, a 27-year-old Confederate veteran. He served as general counsel for the proposed Cincinnati Southern Railway, which would connect Cincinnati to Chattanooga via Lexington. Officials in Louisville tried to block the move, which would break the near-monopoly that the Louisville and Nashville Railroad had on southern trade. On January 25, 1870, he presented his case to the House and Senate railroad committees; although they rejected it at that time, they approved it two years later. Construction began in 1873.

Breckinridge's other railroad ventures were less successful. During his lifetime, he was unable to secure the construction of railroads to his real estate investments in and around Superior, Wisconsin. As president of the newly formed Elizabethtown, Lexington, and Big Sandy Railroad company, he secured financial backing from Collis Potter Huntington for a railroad connecting Elizabethtown and Lexington to the Big Sandy River as part of a route linking those cities with the Atlantic Ocean. When Huntington invested in June 1871, he became president of the company, and Breckinridge became vice president. A line from Lexington to Mount Sterling was all that could be completed before the Panic of 1873 dried up the needed investment capital. The proposed line was finally completed in 1881.

Breckinridge refused all requests – including one by President Ulysses S. Grant – to return to politics, insisting, "I no more feel the political excitements that marked the scenes of my former years than if I were an extinct volcano." Under the terms of the Fourteenth Amendment, a two-thirds vote in each house of Congress would have been needed to allow him to hold office because he had sided with the Confederacy. He never expressed interest in seeking such approval. Speaking as a private citizen in March 1870, he publicly denounced the actions of the Ku Klux Klan. In 1872, he supported passage of a state statute which successfully legalized black testimony against whites in court.

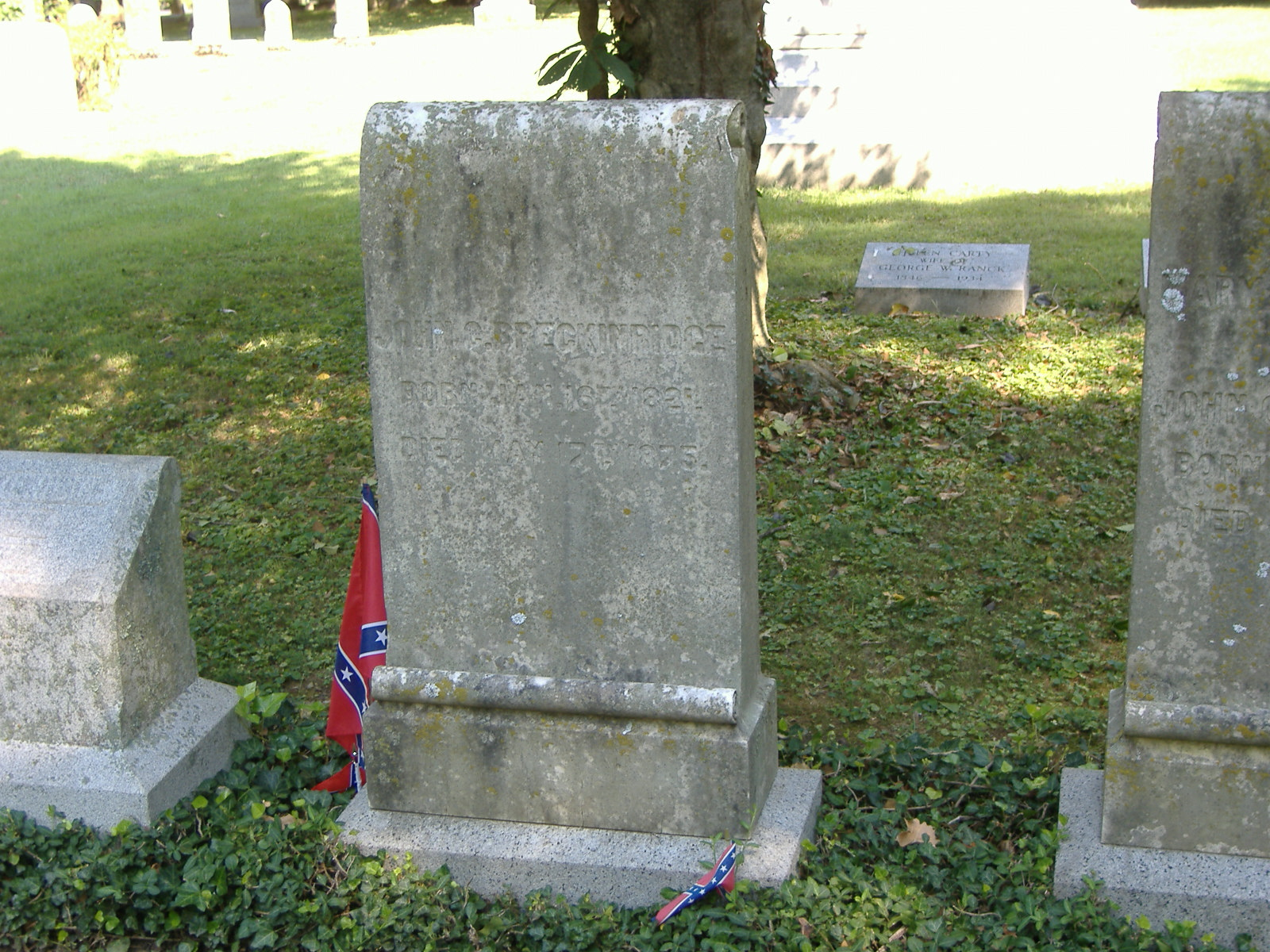
Breckinridge's gravestone

By 1873, Breckinridge began to experience health problems to which he referred as "pleuro-pneumonia". Repeated surgeries and visits to the New York coast and the Virginia mountains did not improve his condition. In May 1875, he consulted surgeons Lewis Sayre and Samuel D. Gross, who concluded that his ill health was caused by cirrhosis brought on by injuries to his liver suffered during the war. Of more immediate concern was the fluid that filled two-thirds of one of his lungs. On May 11, Sayre attempted to create an artificial opening through which the fluid could drain; although he had to stop before completing the operation, some of the fluid was drained, bringing a measure of relief. Assisted by Beck and Frank K. Hunt, Breckinridge completed his will. Sayre further alleviated Breckinridge's pain via another surgery on the morning of May 17, but by the afternoon, his condition rapidly worsened, and he died at approximately 5:45 p.m. at the age of 54. Basil Duke led the funeral procession to Lexington Cemetery where Breckinridge's body was buried.

== Legacy ==
=== Historical reputation ===
As a military commander, Breckinridge was highly respected by some. Fellow Confederate George M. Edgar, describing Breckinridge's performance, wrote:

General Breckinridge had few if any superiors on the field of battle. Besides being a man of wonderful courage, he had a keen eye to discern the strong and weak points of the enemy's position, skill in using his forces to the best advantage, and a celerity of movement which reminded me of Jackson.

On May 20, 1875, the Louisville Courier Journal declared that it was Breckinridge who was "truly representative of the rebellion as an actual force and its underlying causes". He was viewed poorly in the North. The premature New York Times 1863 obituary labelled "him one of the basest and wickedest of traitors."

His strengths included a reputation for dignity and integrity, and especially his tall, graceful and handsome appearance, with cordial manner, pleasing voice and eloquent address that was highly appreciated by voters, soldiers, and women alike. He was hailed as the personification of Kentucky chivalry. Observers said he was a "most noble looking man – a ladies man – such piercing blue eyes I never saw before. His very looks show his superiority over most men."

=== Monuments and memorials ===
Despite differences in spelling, the towns of Breckenridge, Minnesota, Breckenridge, Missouri, Breckenridge, Texas, and Breckenridge, Colorado, were named in Breckinridge's honor. The Colorado town changed the spelling of its name when its namesake joined the Confederacy. Fort Breckinridge, Arizona Territory (1860 to 1865), was named in honor of the Vice President. During the Civil War its name was changed to Fort Stanford in honor of California Governor Leland Stanford, before being changed back to Fort Breckinridge. After the Civil War, the name was changed once again to Camp Grant. Between 1855 and 1862, the county now known as Lyon County, Kansas, was known as Breckinridge County.

He was played by Jason Isaacs in the 2014 film Field of Lost Shoes, which depicted the Battle of New Market. The John C. Breckinridge Memorial was placed on the Fayette County Courthouse lawn in Lexington in 1887. In November 2015, the Urban County Arts Review Board voted to recommend removal of both the Breckinridge statue and one of John Hunt Morgan. Amy Murrell Taylor, the T. Marshall Hahn Jr. Professor of History at the University of Kentucky, claimed that the "statues are not and have never been neutral representations of the Civil War past but instead they are embodiments of a racially charged postwar interpretation of it." The relocation of the memorial to the Lexington Cemetery was completed in July 2018, funded by private donations. Breckinridge's memorial was placed in his family's burial area in Section G.

== See also ==
- Breckinridge family in the American Civil War
- Kentucky in the American Civil War
- List of American Civil War generals (Confederate)
- List of United States senators expelled or censured

== Bibliography ==
- Davis, William C. (2010). Breckinridge: Statesman, Soldier, Symbol. Lexington, KY: The University Press of Kentucky. ISBN 978-0-8071-0068-4.
- Eaton, David Wolfe (1916). How Missouri Counties, Towns and Streams Were Named. Columbia, MO: The State Historical Society of Missouri. ISBN 1-120-29618-8.
- Eicher, John H.; Eicher, David J. (2001). Civil War High Commands. Stanford, CA: Stanford University Press. ISBN 0-8047-3641-3.
- Harrison, Lowell H. (1973). "John C. Breckinridge: Nationalist, Confederate, Kentuckian". Filson Club History Quarterly. 47 (2).
- Heck, Frank H. (1976). Proud Kentuckian: John C. Breckinridge, 1821–1875. Lexington, KY: The University Press of Kentucky. ISBN 0-8131-0217-0.
- Klotter, James C. (1986). The Breckinridges of Kentucky. Lexington, KY: The University Press of Kentucky. ISBN 0-8131-9165-3.
- Klotter, James C. (1992). "Breckinridge, John Cabell". In John E. Kleber (ed.). The Kentucky Encyclopedia. Associate editors: Thomas D. Clark, Lowell H. Harrison, and James C. Klotter. Lexington, KY: The University Press of Kentucky. ISBN 0-8131-1772-0. Archived from the original on July 17, 2019.
- McKnight, Brian D. (2006). Contested Borderland: Civil War in Appalachian Kentucky and Virginia. Lexington, KY: University Press of Kentucky. ISBN 0-8131-2389-5.
- Pollard, Edward A. (1866). The Lost Cause: A New Southern History of the War of the Confederates: Comprising a Full and Authentic Account of the Rise and Progress of the Late Southern Confederacy--the Campaigns, Battles, Incidents, and Adventures of the Most Gigantic Struggle of the World's History. New York, NY: E.B. Treat & Co., Publishers. ISBN 978-0-517-10131-5.
- Sifakis, Stewart (1988). Who was Who in the Civil War. New York: Facts on File. ISBN 0-8131-1772-0.
- Upham, Warren (1920). Minnesota Geographic Names: Their Origin and Historic Significance. Saint Paul, MN: Minnesota Historical Society. ISBN 1-115-33741-6.

U.S. House of Representatives
Preceded by Charles Morehead	Member of the U.S. House of Representatives from Kentucky's 8th congressional district 1851–1855	Succeeded by Alexander Marshall
Party political offices
Preceded by William King	Democratic nominee for Vice President of the United States; 1856	Succeeded by Benjamin Fitzpatrick^{(1)} Withdrew
Preceded by William King	Democratic nominee for Vice President of the United States; 1856	Succeeded by Joseph Lane
Preceded by James Buchanan	Democratic nominee for President of the United States^{(1)} 1860	Succeeded by George McClellan
Political offices
Preceded by William King	Vice President of the United States; 1857–1861	Succeeded by Hannibal Hamlin
Preceded by James Seddon	Confederate States Secretary of War; 1865	Position abolished
U.S. Senate
Preceded by John Crittenden	United States Senator (Class 3) from Kentucky; 1861; Served alongside: Lazarus Powell	Succeeded by Garrett Davis
Notes and references
1. The Democratic party split in 1860, producing two presidential candidates. Breckinridge was nominated by the rebel Southern Democrats; Stephen Douglas was the official nominee by the Northern Democrats.
