= List of presidents of the United States by age =

This is a list of presidents of the United States by age. The first table charts the age of each president of the United States at the time of their inauguration (first inauguration if elected to multiple and consecutive terms), upon leaving office, and at the time of death. Presidents who are still living have their lifespans and post-presidency timespans calculated through November 3, 2026.

== Age of presidents ==
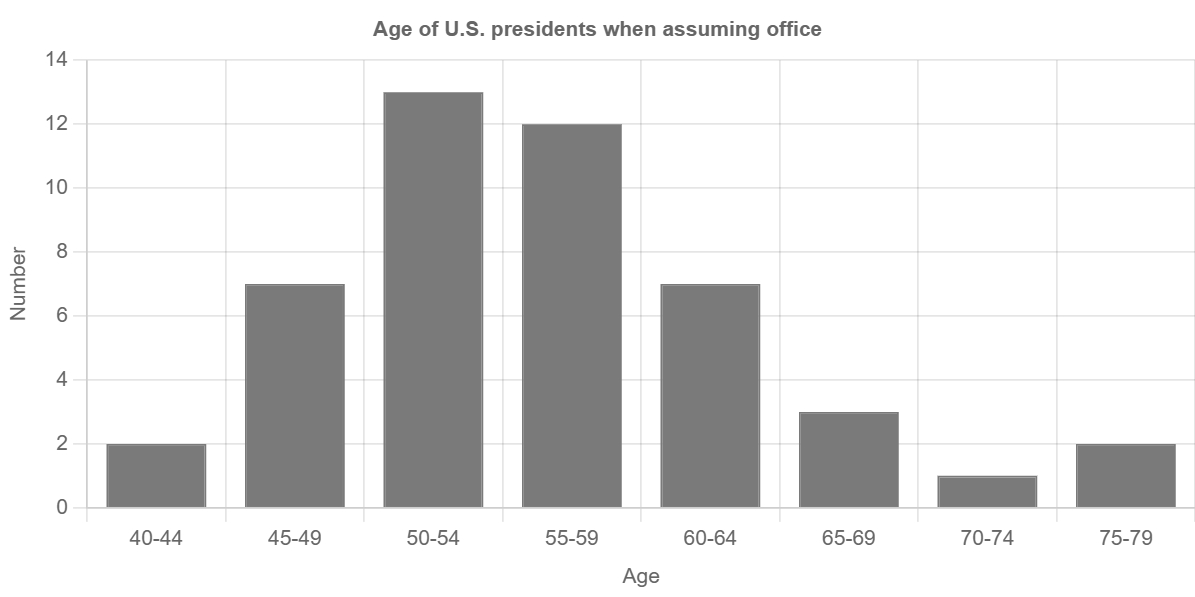
Age of U.S. presidents when assuming office

Article Two of the United States Constitution provides that U.S. presidents must be at least 35 years old at the time they take office. The median age at inauguration of incoming U.S. presidents is 55 years. The youngest person to become U.S. president was Theodore Roosevelt at age 42, who succeeded to the office after the assassination of William McKinley. The oldest person to be inaugurated president is Donald Trump, at age 78 years, 7 months, for his nonconsecutive second term.

John F. Kennedy was the youngest person elected as president, at age 43; assassinated at age 46, he was also the youngest president at the end of his tenure, and his lifespan was the shortest of any president. The oldest president at the end of his tenure is Joe Biden at age 82 years, 2 months. Jimmy Carter had the longest lifespan of any president, becoming the first president to reach the age of 100.

James K. Polk had the shortest retirement of any president, dying of cholera only 103 days after leaving office, at age 53, and the youngest to die of natural causes. Carter's retirement at 43 years, 344 days, is the longest in American presidential history. Biden is the oldest of the five living U.S. presidents, at 83 years, 348 days. The youngest living former president is Barack Obama, age 65 years, 91 days.

== Presidential age-related data ==
No.	President	Born	Age at start of presidency	Age at end of presidency	Post-presidency timespan	Lifespan	
No.	President	Born	Age at start of presidency	Age at end of presidency	Post-presidency timespan	Died	Age
1	George Washington	Feb 22, 1732 (Note: Birthdate as changed to New Style)	57 years, 67 days Apr 30, 1789	65 years, 10 days Mar 4, 1797	2 years, 285 days	Dec 14, 1799	67 years, 295 days
2	John Adams	Oct 30, 1735	61 years, 125 days Mar 4, 1797	65 years, 125 days Mar 4, 1801	25 years, 122 days	Jul 4, 1826	90 years, 247 days
3	Thomas Jefferson	Apr 13, 1743	57 years, 325 days Mar 4, 1801	65 years, 325 days Mar 4, 1809	17 years, 122 days	Jul 4, 1826	83 years, 82 days
4	James Madison	Mar 16, 1751	57 years, 353 days Mar 4, 1809	65 years, 353 days Mar 4, 1817	19 years, 116 days	Jun 28, 1836	85 years, 104 days
5	James Monroe	Apr 28, 1758	58 years, 310 days Mar 4, 1817	66 years, 310 days Mar 4, 1825	6 years, 122 days	Jul 4, 1831	73 years, 67 days
6	John Quincy Adams	Jul 11, 1767	57 years, 236 days Mar 4, 1825	61 years, 236 days Mar 4, 1829	18 years, 356 days	Feb 23, 1848	80 years, 227 days
7	Andrew Jackson	Mar 15, 1767	61 years, 354 days Mar 4, 1829	69 years, 354 days Mar 4, 1837	8 years, 96 days	Jun 8, 1845	78 years, 85 days
8	Martin Van Buren	Dec 5, 1782	54 years, 89 days Mar 4, 1837	58 years, 89 days Mar 4, 1841	21 years, 142 days	Jul 24, 1862	79 years, 231 days
9	William Henry Harrison	Feb 9, 1773	68 years, 23 days Mar 4, 1841	68 years, 54 days Apr 4, 1841	0 days (Note: Died in office)	Apr 4, 1841	68 years, 54 days
10	John Tyler	Mar 29, 1790	51 years, 6 days Apr 4, 1841	54 years, 340 days Mar 4, 1845	16 years, 320 days	Jan 18, 1862	71 years, 295 days
11	James K. Polk	Nov 2, 1795	49 years, 122 days Mar 4, 1845	53 years, 122 days Mar 4, 1849	103 days	Jun 15, 1849	53 years, 225 days
12	Zachary Taylor	Nov 24, 1784	64 years, 100 days Mar 4, 1849	65 years, 227 days Jul 9, 1850	0 days	Jul 9, 1850	65 years, 227 days
13	Millard Fillmore	Jan 7, 1800	50 years, 183 days Jul 9, 1850	53 years, 56 days Mar 4, 1853	21 years, 4 days	Mar 8, 1874	74 years, 60 days
14	Franklin Pierce	Nov 23, 1804	48 years, 101 days Mar 4, 1853	52 years, 101 days Mar 4, 1857	12 years, 218 days	Oct 8, 1869	64 years, 319 days
15	James Buchanan	Apr 23, 1791	65 years, 315 days Mar 4, 1857	69 years, 315 days Mar 4, 1861	7 years, 89 days	Jun 1, 1868	77 years, 39 days
16	Abraham Lincoln	Feb 12, 1809	52 years, 20 days Mar 4, 1861	56 years, 62 days Apr 15, 1865	0 days	Apr 15, 1865	56 years, 62 days
17	Andrew Johnson	Dec 29, 1808	56 years, 107 days Apr 15, 1865	60 years, 65 days Mar 4, 1869	6 years, 149 days	Jul 31, 1875	66 years, 214 days
18	Ulysses S. Grant	Apr 27, 1822	46 years, 311 days Mar 4, 1869	54 years, 311 days Mar 4, 1877	8 years, 141 days	Jul 23, 1885	63 years, 87 days
19	Rutherford B. Hayes	Oct 4, 1822	54 years, 151 days Mar 4, 1877	58 years, 151 days Mar 4, 1881	11 years, 319 days	Jan 17, 1893	70 years, 105 days
20	James A. Garfield	Nov 19, 1831	49 years, 105 days Mar 4, 1881	49 years, 304 days Sep 19, 1881	0 days	Sep 19, 1881	49 years, 304 days
21	Chester A. Arthur	Oct 5, 1829	51 years, 349 days Sep 19, 1881	55 years, 150 days Mar 4, 1885	1 year, 259 days	Nov 18, 1886	57 years, 44 days
22	Grover Cleveland	Mar 18, 1837	47 years, 351 days Mar 4, 1885	51 years, 351 days Mar 4, 1889	4 years, 0 days (Note: This is the length of Cleveland's first (1889–1893) post-presidency, between his two terms in office.)	Jun 24, 1908	71 years, 98 days
23	Benjamin Harrison	Aug 20, 1833	55 years, 196 days Mar 4, 1889	59 years, 196 days Mar 4, 1893	8 years, 9 days	Mar 13, 1901	67 years, 205 days
24	Grover Cleveland	Mar 18, 1837	55 years, 351 days Mar 4, 1893	59 years, 351 days Mar 4, 1897	11 years, 112 days (Note: This is the length of Cleveland's second (1897–1908) post-presidency, after his second term in office.)	Jun 24, 1908	71 years, 98 days
25	William McKinley	Jan 29, 1843	54 years, 34 days Mar 4, 1897	58 years, 228 days Sep 14, 1901	0 days	Sep 14, 1901	58 years, 228 days
26	Theodore Roosevelt	Oct 27, 1858	42 years, 322 days Sep 14, 1901	50 years, 128 days Mar 4, 1909	9 years, 308 days	Jan 6, 1919	60 years, 71 days
27	William Howard Taft	Sep 15, 1857	51 years, 170 days Mar 4, 1909	55 years, 170 days Mar 4, 1913	17 years, 4 days	Mar 8, 1930	72 years, 174 days
28	Woodrow Wilson	Dec 28, 1856	56 years, 66 days Mar 4, 1913	64 years, 66 days Mar 4, 1921	2 years, 336 days	Feb 3, 1924	67 years, 37 days
29	Warren G. Harding	Nov 2, 1865	55 years, 122 days Mar 4, 1921	57 years, 273 days Aug 2, 1923	0 days	Aug 2, 1923	57 years, 273 days
30	Calvin Coolidge	Jul 4, 1872	51 years, 29 days Aug 2, 1923	56 years, 243 days Mar 4, 1929	3 years, 307 days	Jan 5, 1933	60 years, 185 days
31	Herbert Hoover	Aug 10, 1874	54 years, 206 days Mar 4, 1929	58 years, 206 days Mar 4, 1933	31 years, 230 days	Oct 20, 1964	90 years, 71 days
32	Franklin D. Roosevelt	Jan 30, 1882	51 years, 33 days Mar 4, 1933	63 years, 72 days Apr 12, 1945	0 days	Apr 12, 1945	63 years, 72 days
33	Harry S. Truman	May 8, 1884	60 years, 339 days Apr 12, 1945	68 years, 257 days Jan 20, 1953	19 years, 341 days	Dec 26, 1972	88 years, 232 days
34	Dwight D. Eisenhower	Oct 14, 1890	62 years, 98 days Jan 20, 1953	70 years, 98 days Jan 20, 1961	8 years, 67 days	Mar 28, 1969	78 years, 165 days
35	John F. Kennedy	May 29, 1917	43 years, 236 days Jan 20, 1961	46 years, 177 days Nov 22, 1963	0 days	Nov 22, 1963	46 years, 177 days
36	Lyndon B. Johnson	Aug 27, 1908	55 years, 87 days Nov 22, 1963	60 years, 146 days Jan 20, 1969	4 years, 2 days	Jan 22, 1973	64 years, 148 days
37	Richard Nixon	Jan 9, 1913	56 years, 11 days Jan 20, 1969	61 years, 212 days Aug 9, 1974 (Note: Resigned from office)	19 years, 256 days	Apr 22, 1994	81 years, 103 days
38	Gerald Ford	Jul 14, 1913	61 years, 26 days Aug 9, 1974	63 years, 190 days Jan 20, 1977	29 years, 340 days	Dec 26, 2006	93 years, 165 days
39	Jimmy Carter	Oct 1, 1924	52 years, 111 days Jan 20, 1977	56 years, 111 days Jan 20, 1981	43 years, 344 days	Dec 29, 2024	100 years, 89 days
40	Ronald Reagan	Feb 6, 1911	69 years, 349 days Jan 20, 1981	77 years, 349 days Jan 20, 1989	15 years, 137 days	Jun 5, 2004	93 years, 120 days
41	George H. W. Bush	Jun 12, 1924	64 years, 222 days Jan 20, 1989	68 years, 222 days Jan 20, 1993	25 years, 314 days	Nov 30, 2018	94 years, 171 days
42	Bill Clinton	Aug 19, 1946	46 years, 154 days Jan 20, 1993	54 years, 154 days Jan 20, 2001	25 years, 287 days	(living)	80 years, 76 days
43	George W. Bush	Jul 6, 1946	54 years, 198 days Jan 20, 2001	62 years, 198 days Jan 20, 2009	17 years, 287 days	(living)	80 years, 120 days
44	Barack Obama	Aug 4, 1961	47 years, 169 days Jan 20, 2009	55 years, 169 days Jan 20, 2017	9 years, 287 days	(living)	65 years, 91 days
45	Donald Trump	Jun 14, 1946	70 years, 220 days Jan 20, 2017	74 years, 220 days Jan 20, 2021	4 years, 0 days (Note: This is the length of Trump's first (2021–2025) post-presidency, between his two terms in office.)	(living)	80 years, 142 days
46	Joe Biden	Nov 20, 1942	78 years, 61 days Jan 20, 2021	82 years, 61 days Jan 20, 2025	1 year, 287 days	(living)	83 years, 348 days
47	Donald Trump	Jun 14, 1946	78 years, 220 days Jan 20, 2025	(incumbent)	(incumbent)	(living)	80 years, 142 days

== Graphical representation ==
This is a graphical lifespan timeline of the presidents of the United States, listed in order of their first term.

The following chart shows presidents by their age (living presidents in green), with the years of their presidency in blue. The chart starts at 35 years as it is the minimum age to be president.

== See also ==
- List of vice presidents of the United States by age

== Sources ==
- Frank Freidel and Hugh S. Sidey, "The Presidents of the United States". The White House.
- Robert S. Summers, "POTUS: Presidents of the United States". Internet Public Library.
