= Mary Cyrene Breckinridge =

Second Lady of the United States

Mary Breckinridge
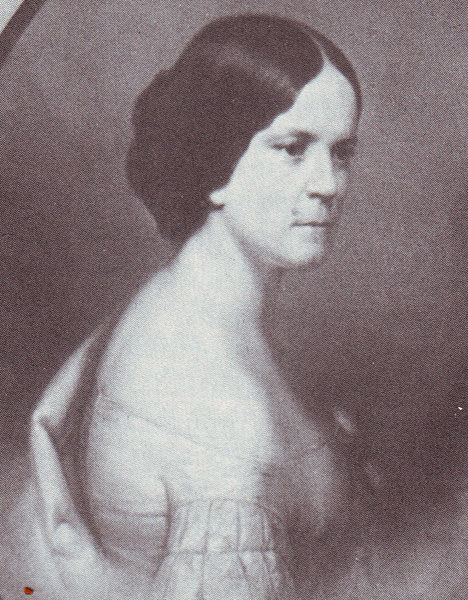

Second Lady of the United States
- In role March 4, 1857 – March 4, 1861
- Vice President: John C. Breckinridge
- Preceded by: Vacant; Abigail Fillmore (before 1850)
- Succeeded by: Ellen Hamlin

Personal details
- Born: Mary Cyrene Burch; August 16, 1826 Georgetown, Kentucky, U.S.
- Died: October 8, 1907 (aged 81) New York City, U.S.
- Resting place: Lexington Cemetery
- Spouse: John C. Breckinridge (m. 1843; died 1875)
- Children: 6, including Clifton and John

Mary Cyrene Breckinridge (née Burch; August 16, 1826 – October 8, 1907) was the wife of John C. Breckinridge and served as the second lady of the United States from March 4, 1857, until March 4, 1861, while her husband was the 14th vice president of the United States.

== Early life ==
Mary Cyrene Burch was born on August 16, 1826, in Georgetown, Kentucky to Clifton Rhodes Burch and Alethia Viley. Her parents died when she was young and she was educated at boarding schools.

== Post Civil War life ==
After the Civil War ended in 1865, in which her husband served as the last Confederate States Secretary of War, he was indicted by the Federal government for high treason. Fearing that he would be put on trial, he fled the country, first into the wilds of Florida, then across the Caribbean to Cuba.

In June 1865, Breckinridge settled initially in exile in Canada, living abroad for three years, traveling to England, France, and the Middle East. The Breckinridge family spent the summer of 1866 in Niagara, on Lake Ontario, where they visited with family and friends, including his cousin Mary Cabell Breckinridge Porter, widow of their cousin Col. Peter A. Porter, who died during the Battle of Cold Harbor, fighting for the Union side.

The family settled in Toronto, Canada, where Breckinridge met other Confederate exiles, including the freed Jefferson Davis. Their daughter Mary later stated that exile was a quiet relief for Mary Burch Breckinridge, it was hard on John. He later rejoined his family in Canada and moved into a house that was within view of the United States border. Following President Andrew Johnson's amnesty for all former Confederates on Christmas Day 1868, John and Mary Breckinridge returned to the US in February 1869.

== Personal life ==
On December 12, 1843, after a brief courtship, she was married to John Cabell Breckinridge, son of Joseph "Cabell" Breckinridge (1788–1823), the 13th Secretary of State of Kentucky, and Mary Clay Smith. Shortly after their marriage, they purchased a home for $1,250 in Georgetown near Breckinridge's law practice. Together, they had six children, including:

- Joseph Cabell Breckinridge II (1844–1906), a prominent New York attorney who married Sallie Frances Johnson, daughter of Robert Ward Johnson
- Clifton Rhodes Breckinridge (1846–1932), an Arkansas Congressman, who married Katherine Carson
- Frances "Frannie" Breckinridge (1848–1924), who married John Andrew Steele (1840–1921)
- John Milton Breckinridge (1849–1850), who died young.
- John Witherspoon "Owen" Breckinridge (1850–1892), a member of California State Assembly from 1884 to 1885, who married Louise Tevis, daughter of Lloyd Tevis, the first president of Wells Fargo Bank.
- Mary Desha Breckinridge (1854–1928), who married Charles Anson Maltby (b. 1848)

In 1875, Mary Breckinridge was widowed. She later died at her daughter's home in University Heights, Bronx on October 8, 1907. She was buried at Lexington Cemetery in Lexington, Kentucky.

=== Descendants ===
Her grandchildren included James Carson Breckinridge (1877–1942), a lieutenant general of the United States Marine Corps and Mary Carson Breckinridge (1881–1965), a nurse-midwife and the founder of the Frontier Nursing Service.

== See also ==
- Breckinridge family
- Ladies' Confederate Memorial

Honorary titles
| Vacant Title last held by Abigail Fillmore | Second Lady of the United States; 1857–1861 | Succeeded by Ellen Hamlin |
