= List of Hamilton College people =

Hamilton College is a private, independent liberal arts college located in Clinton, New York. It has been coeducational since 1978, when it merged with Kirkland College.

Below is a non-comprehensive list of Hamiltonians who have made notable achievements or contributions in their chosen fields.

== Notable alumni ==
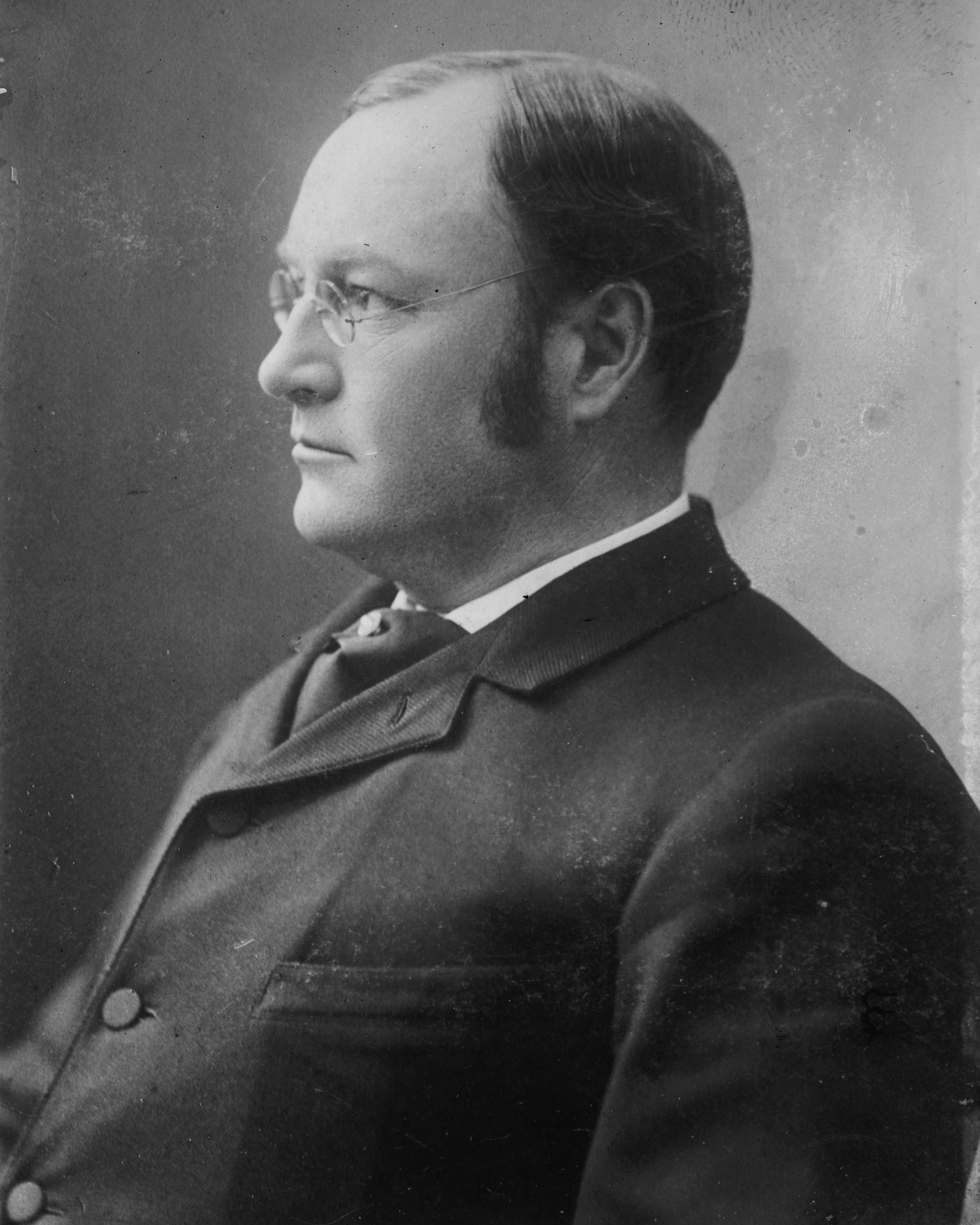
US Vice President James S. Sherman, class of 1878

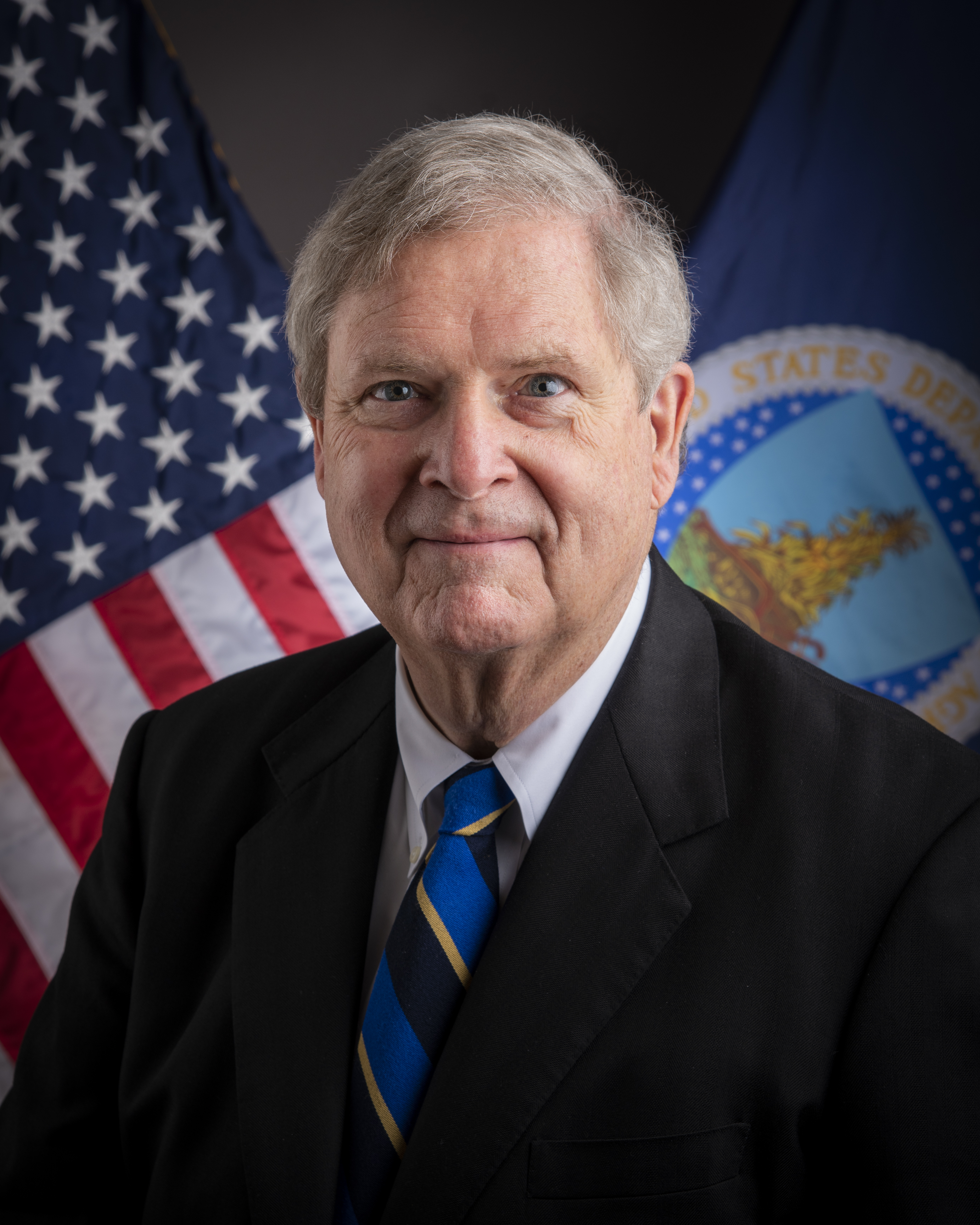
US Secretary of Agriculture, Tom Vilsack, class of 1972

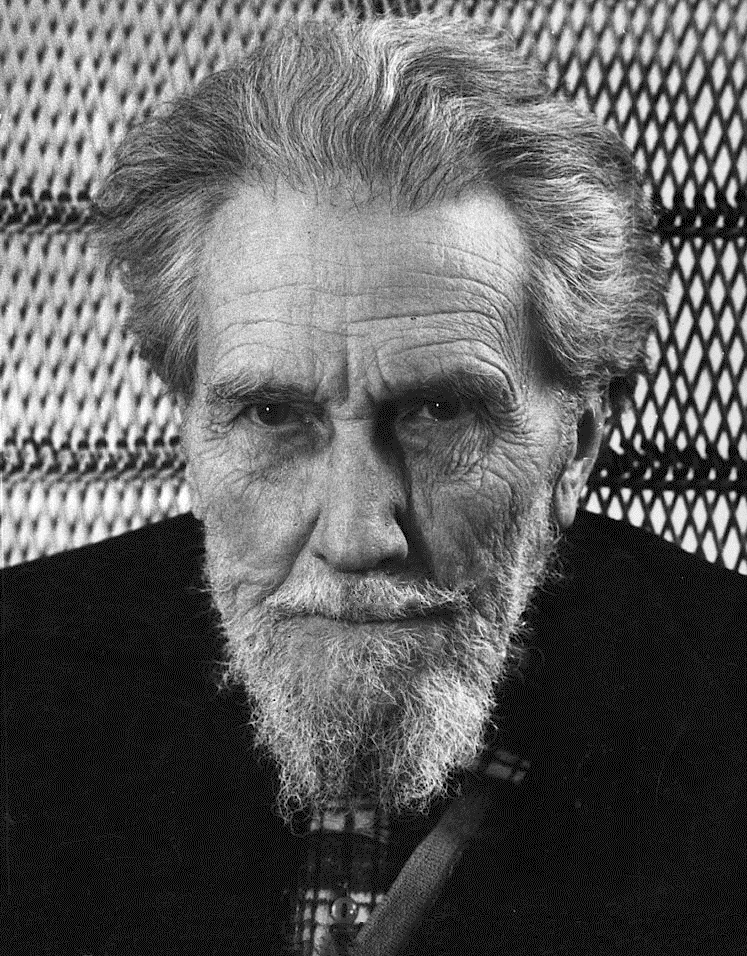
Modernist poet Ezra Pound, class of 1905

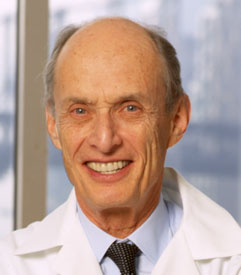
Nobel Prize-winning neuroscientist Paul Greengard, class of 1948

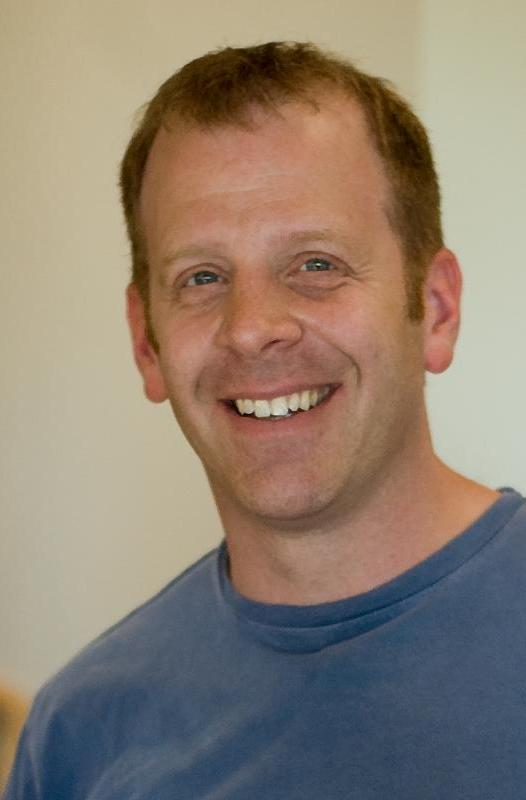
Actor and writer Paul Lieberstein, class of 1989

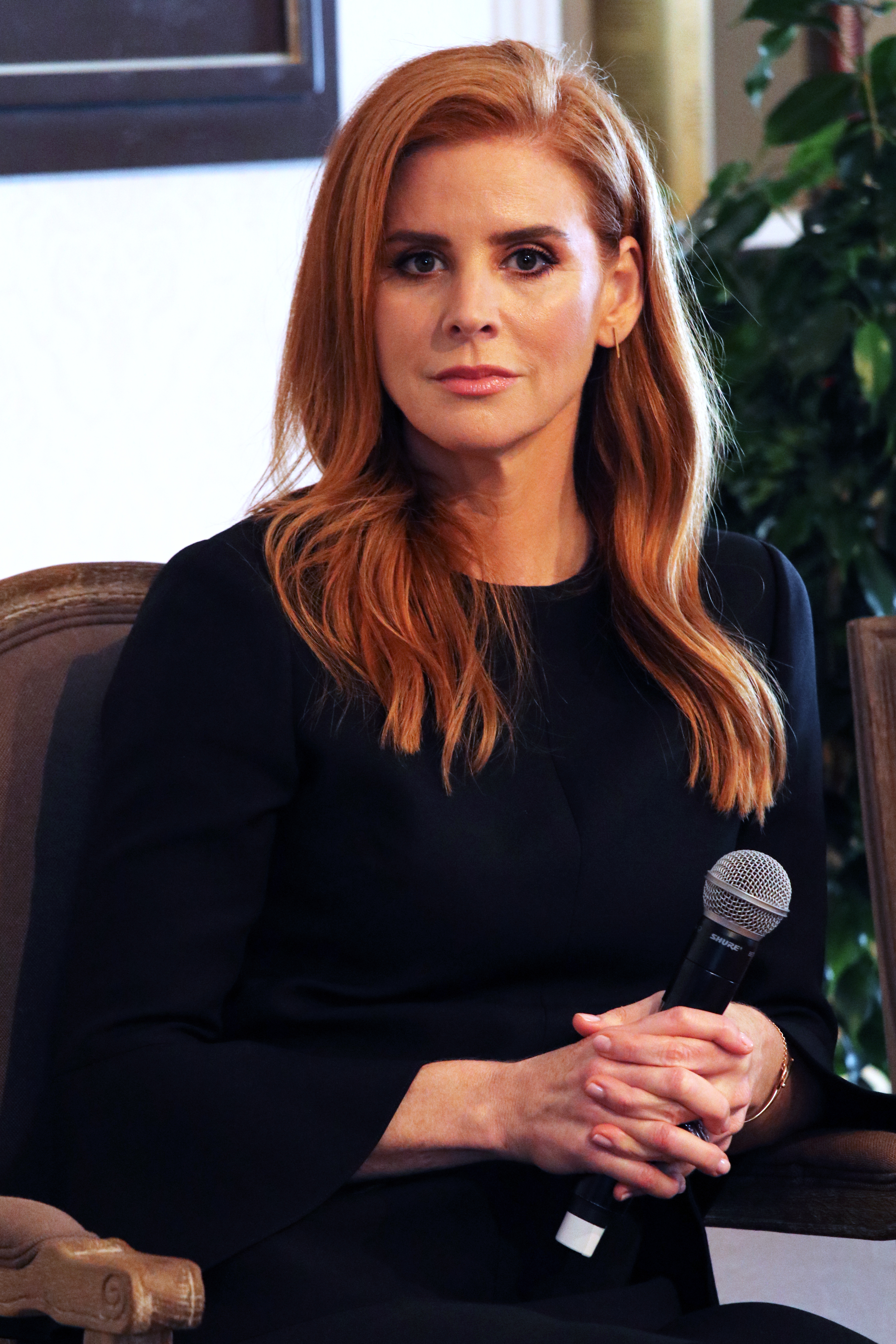
Actress Sarah Rafferty, class of 1993

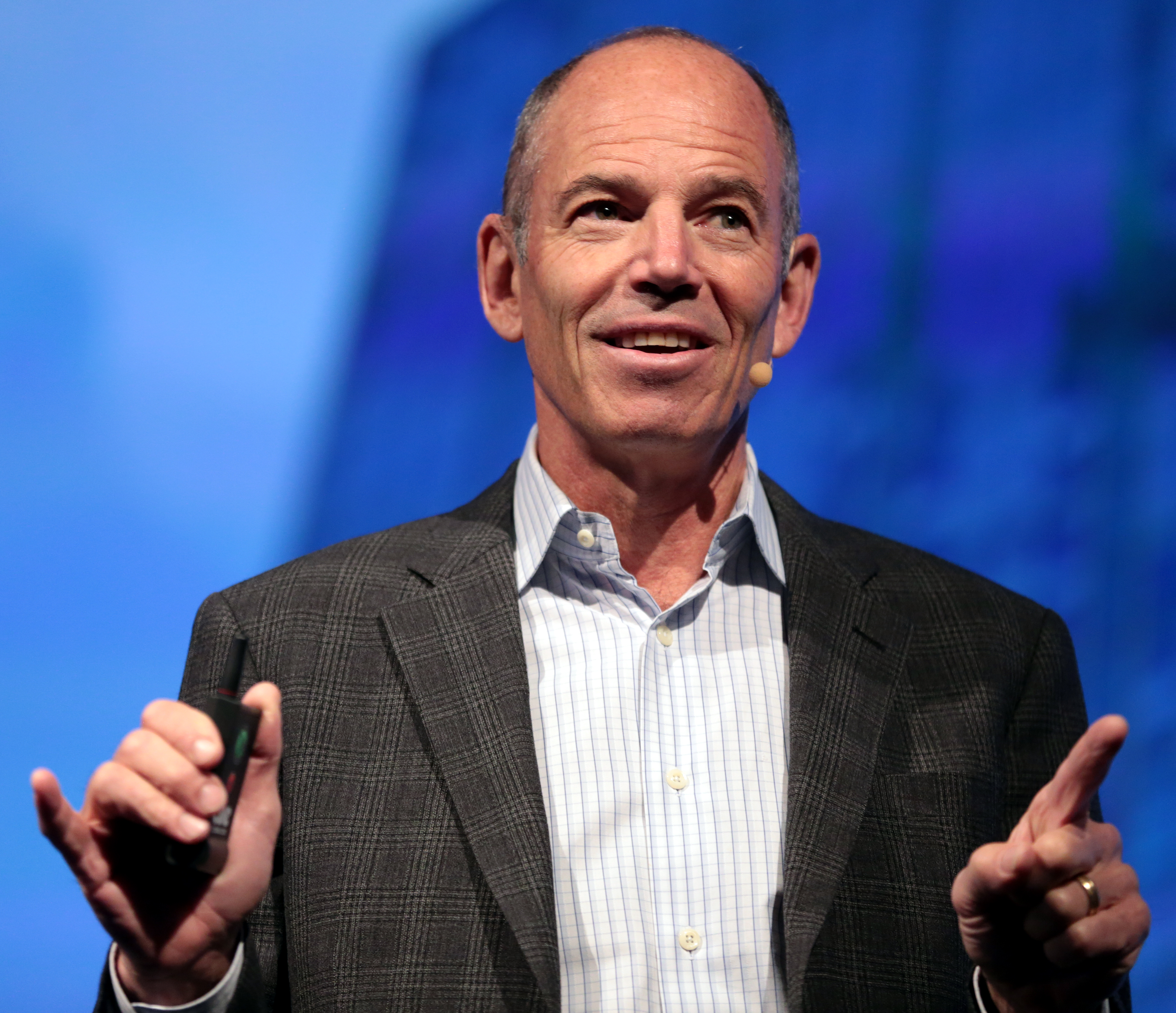
Netflix co-founder Marc Randolph, class of 1980

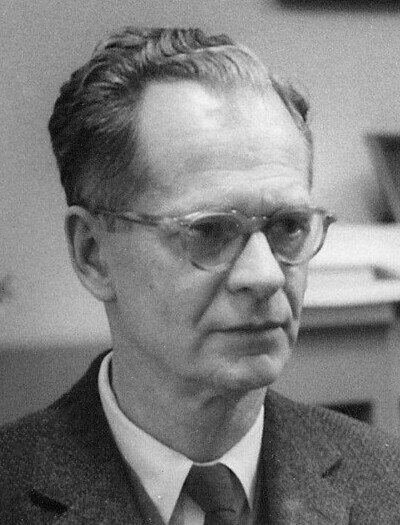
Psychologist B. F. Skinner, class of 1926

=== Law, government, and public affairs ===
==== Legislative branch ====
- David Jewett Baker, class of 1816 - U.S. senator from Illinois
- Matt Cartwright, class of 1983 - U.S. representative from Pennsylvania
- Michael Castle, class of 1961 - 69th governor of Delaware, U.S. representative from Delaware, 2010 Senate candidate (graduation speaker 2004)
- Thomas Treadwell Davis, class of 1831 - U.S. representative from New York
- Victoria Doudera, class of 1983 - state representative in Maine
- Joseph Irwin France, class of 1895 - U.S. senator from Maryland
- Abijah Gilbert, class of 1822 - U.S. senator from Florida
- Joseph Roswell Hawley, class of 1847 - served two terms in the United States House of Representatives; four-term U.S. senator from Connecticut; 42nd governor of Connecticut
- John N. Hungerford, class of 1846 - U.S. representative from New York (1877–79)
- Irving Ives, class of 1919 - U.S. senator from New York
- Oliver A. Morse, class of 1833 - U.S. representative from New York (1857–1859), and co-founder of the Alpha Delta Phi literary society (now a national fraternity)
- Henry B. Payne, class of 1832 - U.S. senator from Ohio
- Theodore M. Pomeroy, class of 1842 - U.S. representative from New York
- Glenni William Scofield, class of 1840 - U.S. representative from Pennsylvania
- Charles B. Sedgwick - United States congressman from New York
- Gerrit Smith - Hamilton's first valedictorian (1818); U.S. House of Representatives 1853–54; a founder of the Republican Party; three-time candidate for president; donated $10,000 to Hamilton just before his death

==== Executive branch ====
- Drew S. Days, III, class of 1963 - United States solicitor general, 1993–1996; later Alfred M. Rankin Professor of Law at Yale Law School
- Michael Dubke, class of 1992 - former White House communications director and former executive director of the Ripon Society
- Victor H. Metcalf, Law School class of 1868 - US secretary of the Navy (1906–08)
- William Henry Harrison Miller, class of 1861 - United States attorney general, 1889–1893
- Ralph Oman, class of 1962 - copyright law luminary
- Elihu Root, class of 1864 - United States secretary of state, recipient of the Nobel Peace Prize in 1912
- James S. Sherman, class of 1878 - vice president of the United States
- Tom Vilsack, class of 1972 - United States secretary of agriculture; 40th governor of Iowa
- Jim Walden, class of 1988 - lawyer, former federal prosecutor with the U.S. attorney's office for the Eastern District of New York

==== Judicial branch ====
- Charles F. Amidon, class of 1882 - judge for the United States District Court for the District of North Dakota
- Charles Holland Duell, class of 1871 - judge of the United States Court of Appeals for the District of Columbia Circuit
- Randolph Moss, class of 1983 - judge of the United States District Court for the District of Columbia
- David Aldrich Nelson, class of 1954 - judge on the United States Court of Appeals for the Sixth Circuit
- Alfred W. Newman, class of 1857 - Wisconsin Supreme Court justice
- Charles Prentiss Orr, class of 1879 - judge of the United States District Court for the Western District of Pennsylvania
- Glenni William Scofield, class of 1840 - judge of the United States Court of Claims
- Augustus Sherrill Seymour, class of 1857 - judge of the United States District Court for the Eastern District of North Carolina
- Roger Gordon Strand, class of 1955 - judge for the United States District Court for the District of Arizona
- Amos Madden Thayer, class of 1862 - judge of the United States Court of Appeals for the Eighth Circuit
- John Curtiss Underwood, class of 1832 - lawyer, abolitionist politician, judge of the United States District Court for the Eastern District of Virginia
- William James Wallace, class of 1857 - judge of the United States Court of Appeals for the Second Circuit
- Hiram Wilson, class of 1832 - judge of the United States District Court for the Northern District of Ohio

==== Diplomats ====
- John B. Emerson, class of 1975 - United States ambassador to Germany (2013 - present)
- Philip Jessup, class of 1917 - diplomat, international law scholar, ambassador
- Sol Linowitz, class of 1935 - attorney, diplomat; negotiated return of the Panama Canal
- William H. Luers, class of 1951 - U.S. ambassador to Czechoslovakia (1983–86); U.S. ambassador to Venezuela (1978–1982)
- Arnold Raphel, class of 1964 - U.S. ambassador to Pakistan (1987–88)
- Edward S. Walker, Jr., class of 1962 - former ambassador to Israel, Egypt, and the United Arab Emirates, Middle East Institute president, Hamilton professor
- Frederick Hampden Winston (1830–1904), attorney, minister to Persia (1885–86)

==== State and city politicians, attorneys, activists, and other ====
- Dean Alfange, class of 1922 - politician; founding member of the Liberal Party of New York; Greek-American; Zionist activist
- Ashton Applewhite, Kirkland class of 1974 - writer and anti-ageism activist
- Mary Bonauto, class of 1983 - gay rights activist and attorney; successfully argued the Obergefell v. Hodges case that overturned state bans on same-sex marriage in 2015
- Archibald W. Campbell, class of 1855 - lawyer, journalist, and abolitionist
- George W. Clinton, class of 1825 - mayor of Buffalo, district attorney of Ontario County, United States attorney for the Northern District of New York, judge of the Buffalo Superior Court
- Steve Culbertson, class of 1979 - president and chief executive officer at Youth Service America
- Bruce Cutler, class of 1970 - criminal defense lawyer; attorney for John Gotti and Louis Eppolito
- Angela Davis, Hamilton College Junior Year in France Program (1963-64 academic year) - Marxist and feminist political activist, philosopher, academic, and author
- George T. Downing, attended
- Marc Elias, class of 1990 - voting rights attorney, founder of Democracy Docket
- Clarence L. Fisher, class of 1900 - businessman, real estate and timber, member New York State Assembly
- Bela Hubbard, class of 1834 - Michigan pioneer, writer, geologist, lawyer, lumberman
- William A. Jacobson, class of 1981 - conservative commentator and clinical professor at Cornell Law School
- Ron Kim, class of 2001 - member of New York State Assembly and first Korean-American elected in New York State
- Bob Moses, class of 1956 - civil rights activist; Algebra Project
- James Noxon, studied 1834-36, then transferred to Union College - New York state senator, member New York State Supreme Court
- Bill Purcell, class of 1976 - mayor of Nashville
- Dan Siegel, class of 1967 - labor attorney and civil rights activist
- Lloyd Paul Stryker, class of 1906 - noted criminal defense lawyer; defended Alger Hiss
- Christie Vilsack, Kirkland class of 1972 - literacy advocate and politician; former First Lady of Iowa
- Theodore Dwight Weld - abolitionist; never enrolled as a student, but about 1825 he stayed at the College in the suite of tutor William Kirkland, attended classes, and was "something of a leader among the students"
- Hiram Wilson, class of 1832 - abolitionist, educator, worked with Josiah Henson to establish the British-American Institute, delegate to the 1843 World Anti-Slavery Convention

=== Literature and journalism ===
- Samuel Hopkins Adams, class of 1891 - author and investigative journalist
- Henry Allen, class of 1963 - critic who won Pulitzer Prize for Criticism (most prominently associated with The Washington Post)
- Albert Barnes, class of 1820 - theologian
- Josh Billings, class of 1840 (did not graduate) - pen name of Henry Wheeler Shaw
- Terry Brooks, class of 1966 - fantasy author
- Peter Cameron, class of 1982 - novelist and short-story writer
- Benjamin Woodbridge Dwight, class of 1835 - educator and author
- Alf Evers, class of 1928 (did not graduate) - historian
- Amanda Filipacchi, class of 1988 - author of Nude Men, Vapor, and Love Creeps
- Michael Greenspan, class of 1969 - CNN correspondent and documentary filmmaker
- James Grinwis - poet
- Michael Patrick Hearn, class of 1972 (transferred to Bard College) - literary critic and man of letters
- Bill Henderson, class of 1967 - author and publisher; founder of Pushcart Press
- George Wheeler Hinman, class of 1884 - newspaper publisher and writer, President of Marietta College
- Harry Kondoleon, class of 1977 - author and playwright, Obie Award winner
- Chester Sanders Lord, managing editor, New York Sun; regent of the University of the State of New York
- Sarah J. Maas, class of 2008 - author of best-selling fantasy series
- Thomas Meehan, class of 1951 - wrote the books for the musicals Annie and The Producers
- Peter Meinke, class of 1955 - poet and author
- John Nichols, class of 1962 - author of The Milagro Beanfield War and The Sterile Cuckoo
- Steve Orlando, class of 2008 - comic book writer
- Ezra Pound, class of 1905 - poet, modernist polemicist, critic
- Preeta Samarasan, class of 1998 - Malaysian author writing in English
- Clinton Scollard, class of 1881 - poet
- Kamila Shamsie, class of 1995 - novelist
- Evan Smith, class of 1987 - Texas Tribune CEO and editor-in-chief
- Mark T. Sullivan, class of 1980 - author of mystery, suspense and historical fiction novels
- Charles Dudley Warner, class of 1851 - attorney, essayist, and editor; collaborated with Mark Twain on The Gilded Age, Hamilton awarded him the honorary degree Doctor of Letters
- Alexander Woollcott, class of 1909 - critic and commentator; early contributor to The New Yorker; member of the Algonquin Round Table
- Steve Wulf, class of 1972 - magazine journalist, editor, and book writer; former executive editor at ESPN The Magazine; worked for publications including Sports Illustrated, Entertainment Weekly, The Economist, and Time

=== Scientists, physicians, psychologists, engineers, mathematicians, and other researchers ===
- Lauren Ackerman, class of 1927 - physician and pathologist, championed the subspecialty of surgical pathology in the mid-20th century
- Richard Scott Conley - dental academic
- Edward L. Deci, class of 1964 - psychologist known for studies of human motivation ("self-determination theory")
- Paul Greengard, class of 1948 - neuroscientist awarded Nobel Prize for Physiology or Medicine in 2000
- Edward Skinner King, class of 1887 - astronomer and developer of the King Tracking Rate
- Garret Kramer, class of 1984 - sports psychologist
- William Howell Masters, class of 1938 - physician and research pioneer in the fields of hormone replacement therapy and sexology; co-author (with Virginia E. Johnson) of Human Sexual Response (1966)
- John Christopher Muran, class of 1984 - clinical psychologist and psychotherapy researcher
- Jonathan Schooler, class of 1981 - psychologist who developed the theory of verbal overshadowing
- B.F. Skinner, class of 1926 - behavioral psychologist considered the most influential psychologist of the 20th century
- Augustus William Smith, class of 1825 - mathematician and astronomer
- Lawrence Weed, class of 1945 - academic physician and inventor of the problem-oriented medical record
- Edward J. Wickson - class of 1868 - agronomist and researcher at University of California, Berkeley

=== Academics and scholars (not otherwise listed) ===
- Robert Livingston Allen - linguist credited with developing "sector analysis" (professor at Columbia University)
- David K. Backus - financial economist (Heinz Riehl Professor at New York University's Stern School of Business)
- John J. Donohue III - law and economics scholar (professor at Yale Law School and Stanford Law School)
- Theodore William Dwight - pioneering legal educator who served on Hamilton faculty before serving as founding dean at Columbia Law School
- Benjamin A. Elman - sinologist, Gordon Wu '58 Professor of Chinese Studies, Princeton University
- Samih Farsoun - influential Arab Studies scholar
- Daniel Willard Fiske (did not graduate) - archivist, chess writer (co-author of Paul Morphy) and Icelandic studies scholar at Cornell University
- Erica Flapan - mathematician
- Charles L. Flynn, Jr. - historian and president of the College of Mount Saint Vincent
- David Greene, class of 1985 - 20th president of Colby College
- John M. Jacobus Jr. - art historian and professor at Princeton University and the University of California at Berkeley
- Matthew E. Kahn - economist at Johns Hopkins University, author of Climatopolis
- Harvey J. Levin - economist, studied spectrum allocation
- Asa Mahan - first president of Oberlin College, later of Adrian College
- Jeffrey Mass - historian, author and Japanologist (formerly Yamato Ichihashi Professor of Japanese History at Stanford University)
- Benjamin Dean Meritt - classical scholar, professor and epigraphist of ancient Greece (served on faculties at Princeton University, University of Michigan and the Institute for Advanced Study)
- James H. Morey - medievalist (and English professor at Emory University)
- Edward Orton Sr. - first president of Ohio State University and geologist
- Alicia Ouellette - dean of Albany Law School
- John H. Peck - 8th president of Rensselaer Polytechnic Institute
- John Norton Pomeroy - former dean of New York University Law School
- Stephen G. Rabe, class of 1970 - historian and former Ashbel Smith Chair in History at the University of Texas at Dallas
- Edward Robinson, class of 1816 - biblical scholar known as the “father of biblical archaeology”
- William A. Shanklin, class of 1883 - Methodist minister, president of Upper Iowa University and Wesleyan University
- Kosali Simon - health economist

=== Arts and entertainment ===
- Otis Bigelow, class of 1943 - Broadway actor and New York socialite (later professor at Dartmouth College)
- Robert Bilheimer, class of 1966 - Academy Award-nominated documentary filmmaker, A Closer Walk
- Jake Blount, class of 2017 - musician, scholar and activist
- Kevin Burns, class of 1977 - Emmy Award-winning television producer and filmmaker
- Roz Chast, Kirkland class of 1975 - cartoonist and staff cartoonist for The New Yorker; listed by ComicsAlliance as one of twelve female cartoonists deserving of lifetime achievement recognition
- Sandy Faison, Kirkland class of 1972 - Broadway actress, singer, and acting teacher
- Peter Falk, class of 1949 (did not graduate) - actor, most famous for Columbo TV series
- Nat Faxon, class of 1997 - Academy Award-winning screenwriter (The Descendants); actor (Grosse Pointe, The Conners, Friends From College, Disenchantment, The Epic Tales of Captain Underpants, Beerfest)
- Helaman Ferguson, class of 1962 - sculptor and mathematician
- Spencer Finch, class of 1985 - artist
- Yance Ford - producer and director
- Deborah Forte, class of 1975 - producer of children's television and movies; president of Scholastic Media
- Josh Gardner - actor, comedian, writer; played titular character in the cult TV show Gerhard Reinke's Wanderlust
- Jonathan Gilbert - actor, Little House on the Prairie
- Tony Goldwyn, class of 1982 (did not graduate) - actor, singer, producer, director, and political activist
- Eugene Goossen (1921–1997) - art critic and historian
- David Grubin, class of 1965 - Emmy-winning documentary filmmaker
- Bill Harley, class of 1977 - children's entertainer, musician, and author
- Joe Howard, class of 1970 - actor, Mathnet
- Daniel Huntington, class of 1835 - Hudson River School artist
- Frederick King Keller, class of 1972 - television and movie director and writer
- Harry Kondoleon, class of 1977 - playwright and novelist; awarded Fulbright, National Endowment for the Arts, Rockefeller, and Guggenheim fellowships
- Christopher Kostow, class of 1999 - executive chef, The Restaurant at Meadowood; James Beard Foundation Award winner and recipient of three Michelin stars
- Eric Kuhn, class of 2009 - theatrical producer and entrepreneur; three-time Tony Award winner and co-founder and co-CEO of Folk Media Group
- Paul Lieberstein, class of 1989 - writer and actor; played Toby Flenderson on NBC's The Office
- Grayson McCouch, class of 1991 - actor, As the World Turns
- Richard Nelson, class of 1972 - playwright; current director of playwriting program at Yale University
- Sarah Rafferty, class of 1993 - actress, Suits, 2011–present
- Jay Reise, class of 1972 - composer
- Ryan Serhant, class of 2006 - actor, realtor, Million Dollar Listing New York
- Josh Simpson, class of 1972 - world-renowned glass sculptor
- David Thornton, class of 1977 - actor; husband of Cyndi Lauper
- Thomas Tull, class of 1992 - founder, chairman and CEO of Legendary Pictures; film producer
- Melinda Wagner, Kirkland class of 1979 - winner of the 1999 Pulitzer Prize in Music Composition
- John Van Alstyne Weaver, class of 1914 - screenwriter and poet

=== Business leaders ===
- J. Carter Bacot, class of 1955 - former chairman and CEO, Bank of New York
- William McLaren Bristol, class of 1882 - co-founder of Bristol-Myers Squibb
- Henry Elghanayan - New York real estate developer
- Dan Ferguson, class of 1948 - former CEO of Newell Rubbermaid
- Edward Gelsthorpe, class of 1942 - marketing executive called "Cranapple Ed" for his best-known product launch
- John Jay Knox, class of 1849 - financier and comptroller of the treasury (1867–84)
- A. G. Lafley, class of 1969 - CEO of Procter & Gamble; named one of America's Best Leaders by US News
- John Ripley Myers, class of 1887 - co-founder of Bristol-Myers Squibb
- Dan Nye, class of 1988 - former CEO of LinkedIn
- Neal Pilson, class of 1960 - former president of CBS Sports
- Marc Randolph, class of 1980 - co-founder of Netflix
- Stephen Sadove, class of 1973 - CEO of Saks Incorporated, the parent company of Saks Fifth Avenue
- Ryan Serhant, class of 2006 - founder of SERHANT; real estate broker, television personality, and author
- David M. Solomon, class of 1984 - CEO of Goldman Sachs

=== Clergy ===
- David Riddle Breed, class of 1867 - Presbyterian theologian, author of History and Use of Hymns and Hymn Tunes
- Edwin Otway Burnham, class of 1852 - rifle-shooting Presbyterian missionary in Sioux Indian territory
- Benjamin Woodbridge Dwight, class of 1835 - Congregationalist minister, philologist and educator
- Franklin Clark Fry, class of 1921 - president of the United Lutheran Church in America and the Lutheran Church in America
- Hiram H. Kellogg (1806–1881) - minister and founder of the Clinton Female Seminary; first president of Knox College
- George William Knox, class of 1874 - Presbyterian theologian, missionary, professor at the Imperial University of Tokyo
- Theodore B. Lyman - bishop of the Episcopal Diocese of North Carolina
- Arthur Tappan Pierson, class of 1857 - Presbyterian theologian; author of The Crisis of Missions (1886)
- George Warren Wood Jr., class of 1865 - Presbyterian missionary to Northern Michigan, missionary to the Dakota Mission, and charter member of the utopian Fairhope Single Tax Corporation

=== Sports ===
- Guy Hebert, class of 1989 - professional hockey player
- Jeff Hewitt, class of 1974 - professional football player
- Joseph Lin, class of 2015 - professional basketball player and brother of Jeremy Lin
- André Matias, class of 2012 - 2016 Olympic rower
- Merritt Paulson, class of 1995 - majority owner of Portland Timbers and Portland Thorns FC
- Bill Smith, class of 1980 - general manager, Minnesota Twins
- Kyle Smith, class of 1992 - head men's basketball coach, Washington State University
- Ward Wettlaufer, class of 1959 - amateur golfer
- Gillian Zucker, class of 1990 - former president of Auto Club Speedway, and currently president of business operations for the Los Angeles Clippers

=== Pioneers in education and cultural exchange ===
- Samuel Eells, class of 1832 - founder of the Alpha Delta Phi literary society (now a national fraternity); lawyer, essayist, and advocate for literary and moral improvement in higher education
- Zeng Laishun (did not graduate) - Chinese interpreter, businessman, and educator; first Chinese student to attend an American college or university and among the earliest Chinese students to study abroad; later played a role in China’s education and diplomatic reforms
- Lorenzo Latham, class of 1832 - co-founder of the Alpha Delta Phi literary society (now a national fraternity); editor and publisher

== Alumni from works of fiction ==
- Newspaper editor Charles Webb from the Thornton Wilder play Our Town
- Radio host Sheridan Whiteside from the George S. Kaufman and Moss Hart play and film The Man Who Came to Dinner, based on the real Hamilton graduate Alexander Woollcott

== Notable faculty ==
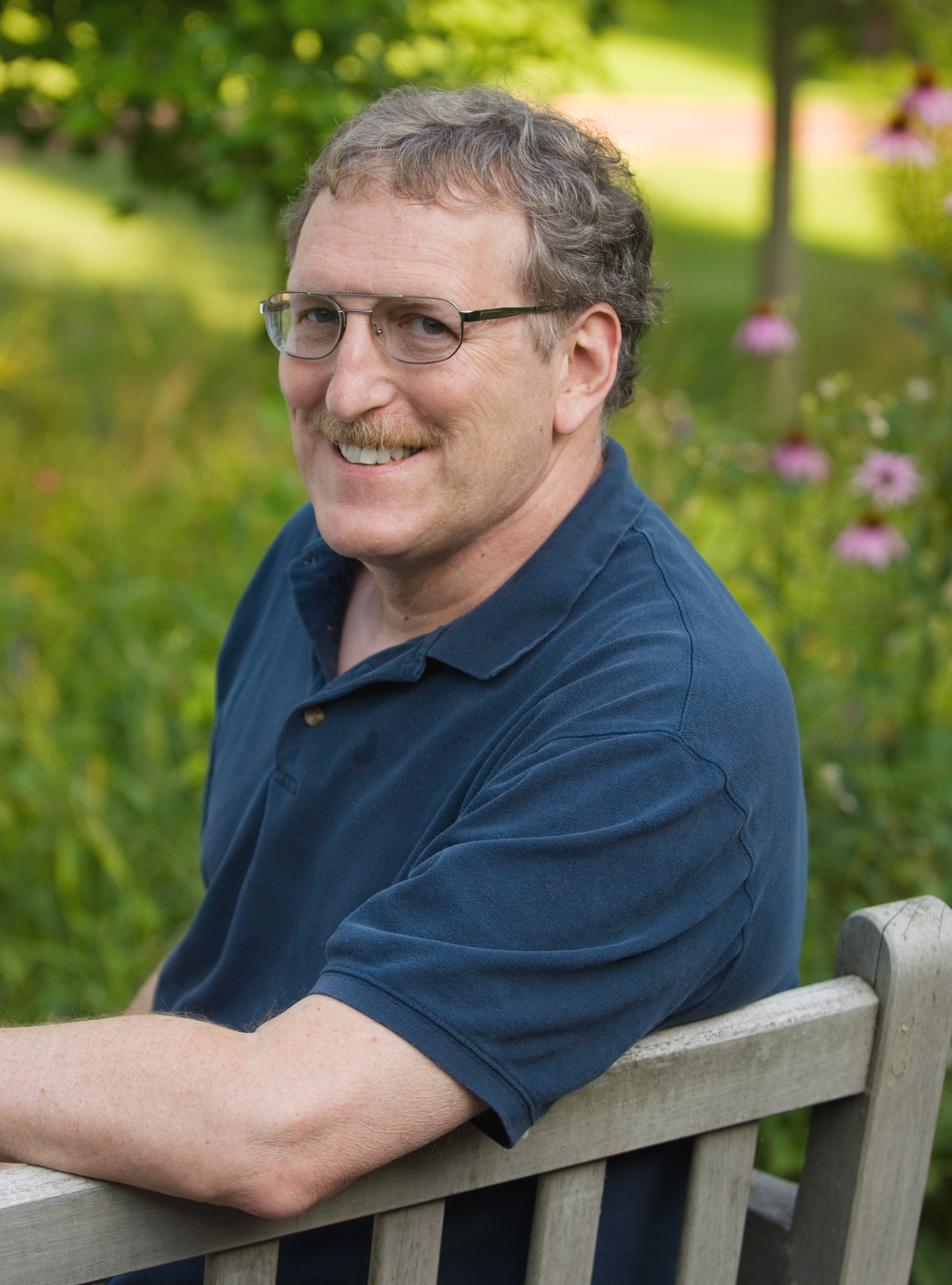
Historian Maurice Isserman, Hamilton professor 1990–present

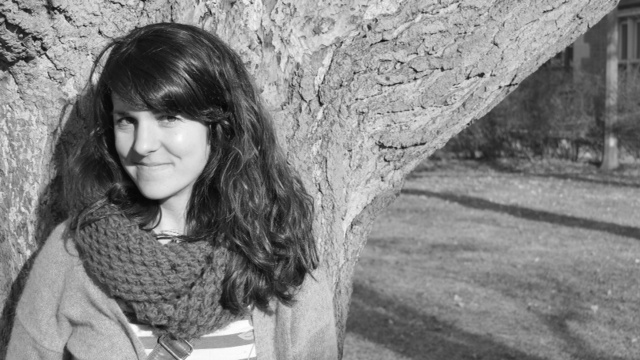
Writer Anne Valente, Hamilton professor 2017–present

=== Current members ===
- Frank Anechiarico - government and law
- Debra Boutin - mathematics
- Heather Buchman - music
- Sally Cockburn - mathematics
- Mackenzie Cooley - historian of nature’s entanglement with power, winner of the 2025 Dan David Prize
- Dennis Gilbert - sociologist, developed the Gilbert Model
- Shelley Haley - professor of Classics and Africana Studies
- Maurice Isserman - historian with notable works on the American Left, the 1960s, and mountaineering
- Marianne Janack - philosophy
- Derek C. Jones - economist
- Philip Klinkner - political scientist specializing in American politics
- Katharine Kuharic - art
- Scott MacDonald - cinema and media studies
- Russell Marcus - philosophy
- Jack F. Matlock, Jr. - former U.S. ambassador to Soviet Union under Reagan
- Quincy D. Newell - history
- Nancy Sorkin Rabinowitz - feminist literary critic, classicist
- Heidi Ravven - expert on Jewish ethics, Spinoza, and the relationship between religion and science
- Jane Springer - creative writing
- Anne Valente - short-story writer, essayist, novelist
- Edward S. Walker - former U.S. ambassador to Israel, Egypt, and the UAE; Middle East specialist

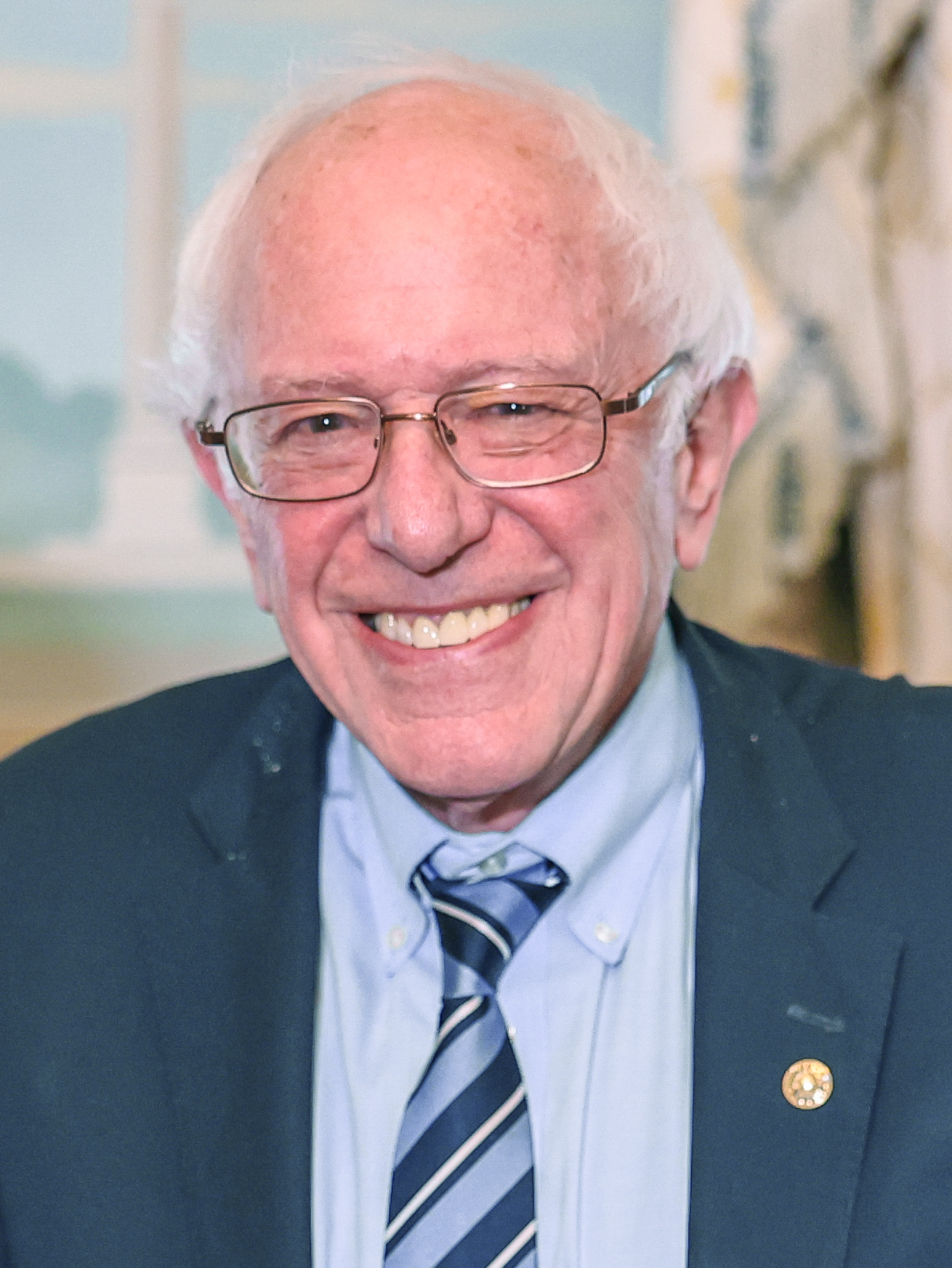
United States Senator Bernie Sanders, Hamilton professor spring of 1990

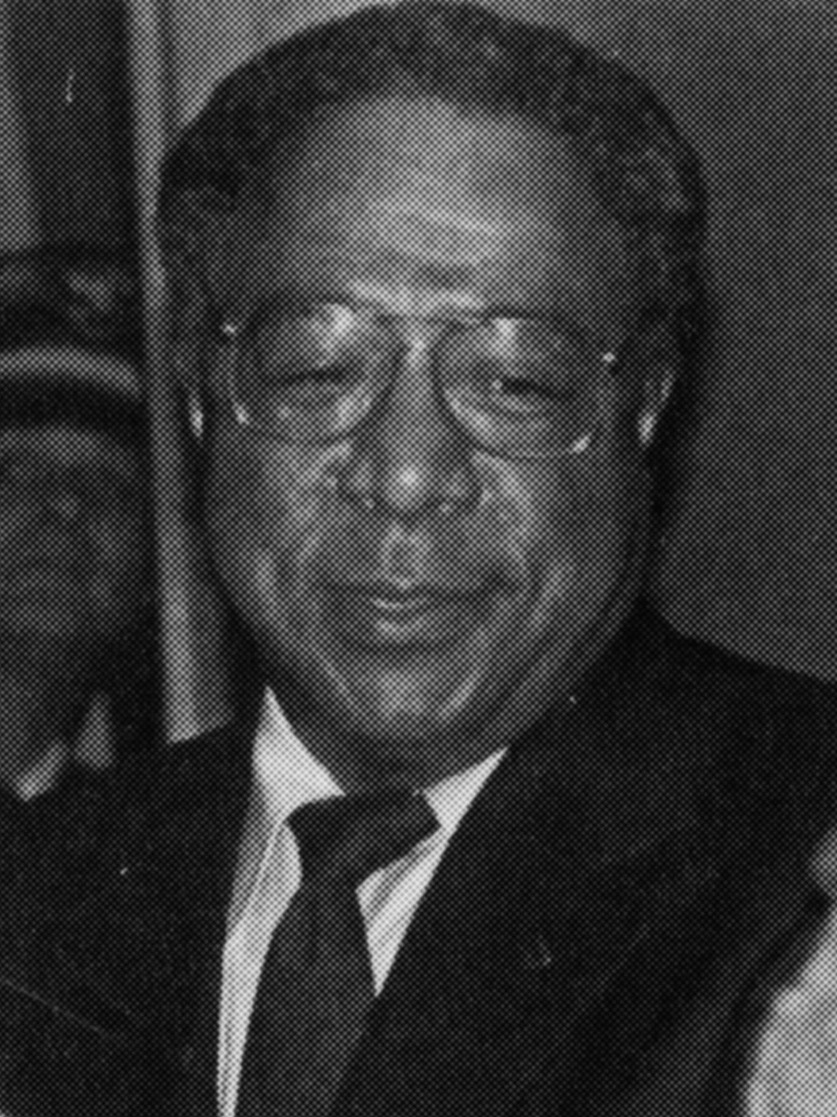
Author Alex Haley worked on his acclaimed novel Roots while serving as a writer-in-residence at Hamilton College.

=== Former members (both permanent and visiting) ===
- Agha Shahid Ali - poet, finalist for the National Book Award
- Robert C. Allen - economic historian and professor at Oxford University
- Alfred Atherton - former United States Ambassador to Egypt
- Natalie Babbitt - author of children's literature, Tuck Everlasting
- Esther Barazzone - president emerita of Chatham University in Pittsburgh, Pennsylvania
- Helen Barolini - writer, editor, and translator
- Thomas Bass - author, The Eudaemonic Pie
- Larry Birns - Latin Americanist
- Joel Black - literary critic
- Brigitte Boisselier - Raëlian and CEO of Clonaid, the "scientific wing" of the Raëlian movement
- Hermann Carl George Brandt - German literature and language scholar
- Jill Bullitt - scholar-in-residence
- Francis Marion Burdick - legal scholar and longtime professor at Columbia Law School
- Mary Bucci Bush - short story writer
- Albert Huntington Chester - geologist and mountaineer
- Richard N. Current - historian, winner of the Bancroft Prize
- Frederick M. Davenport - political science
- Eugene Domack - geologist
- Hubert Dreyfus - artificial intelligence philosopher and professor at University of California, Berkeley
- Ann duCille - African-American literature
- Sereno Edwards Dwight - intellectual historian and Congregationalist minister
- Theodore William Dwight - jurist and pioneering dean of Columbia Law School, professor of law and civil polity at Hamilton
- Edwin Erickson - member of the Pennsylvania Senate, representing the 26th District
- James Fankhauser - conductor
- Elizabeth Flower - philosopher
- Bobby Fong - English, dean of the faculty
- Karl Geiringer - German-American musicologist and biographer
- Kevin Grant - historian
- Edgar B. Graves - history
- Alex Haley - was briefly writer-in-residence
- Elaine Tuttle Hansen - president of Bates College
- Suzanne Keen - vice president for Academic Affairs, dean of faculty, and professor of Literature
- Jerome B. Komisar - economist and president of the University of Alaska
- Stephen G. Kurtz - history
- John Hiram Lathrop - first president of the University of Missouri; first chancellor of the University of Wisconsin-Madison; president of Indiana University
- George Lenczowski - political scientist and longtime professor at University of California, Berkeley
- Cheng Li - director of the John L. Thornton China Center at the Brookings Institution
- Edwin Chesley Estes Lord - geology
- Arthur Marder - naval historian
- Robert G. Miner
- Chandra Talpade Mohanty - post-colonial feminist theorist
- John Monteith - first president of the University of Michigan
- Howard Nemerov - poet, twice Poet Laureate of the United States
- Edward North - Greek
- Gail R. O'Day - religion
- C. Stanley Ogilvy - mathematics
- Margo Okazawa-Rey
- Robert L. Paquette - history
- Boyd Crumrine Patterson - mathematics
- C. H. F. Peters (1813–1890) - professor of astronomy
- Nancy Sorkin Rabinowitz - classics
- Duncan Rice - principal of the University of Aberdeen; former Vice-Chancellor of New York University
- David P. Robbins - mathematician
- Oren Root (1803–1885) - son of Elihu Root and father of Elihu Root and Oren Root Jr., professor of mathematics, 1849–1881; Hamilton graduate
- Oren Root Jr. - older brother of Elihu Root, Presbyterian minister and professor of mathematics and natural sciences; formerly professor of English at the University of Missouri; Hamiton registrar for many years
- Bernie Sanders - visiting professor of sociology at Hamilton during the spring of 1990, where he taught two courses; later U.S. senator from Vermont
- Clinton Scollard - poet
- Eve Kosofsky Sedgwick - gender theorist and cultural critic
- Ty Seidule - history
- Charles Henry Smyth, Jr. - geologist
- David R. Stone - history
- Leo Strauss - political philosopher and classicist
- Theodore Strong - mathematics
- Orest Subtelny - scholar of Ukrainian history

== Presidents of Hamilton College ==
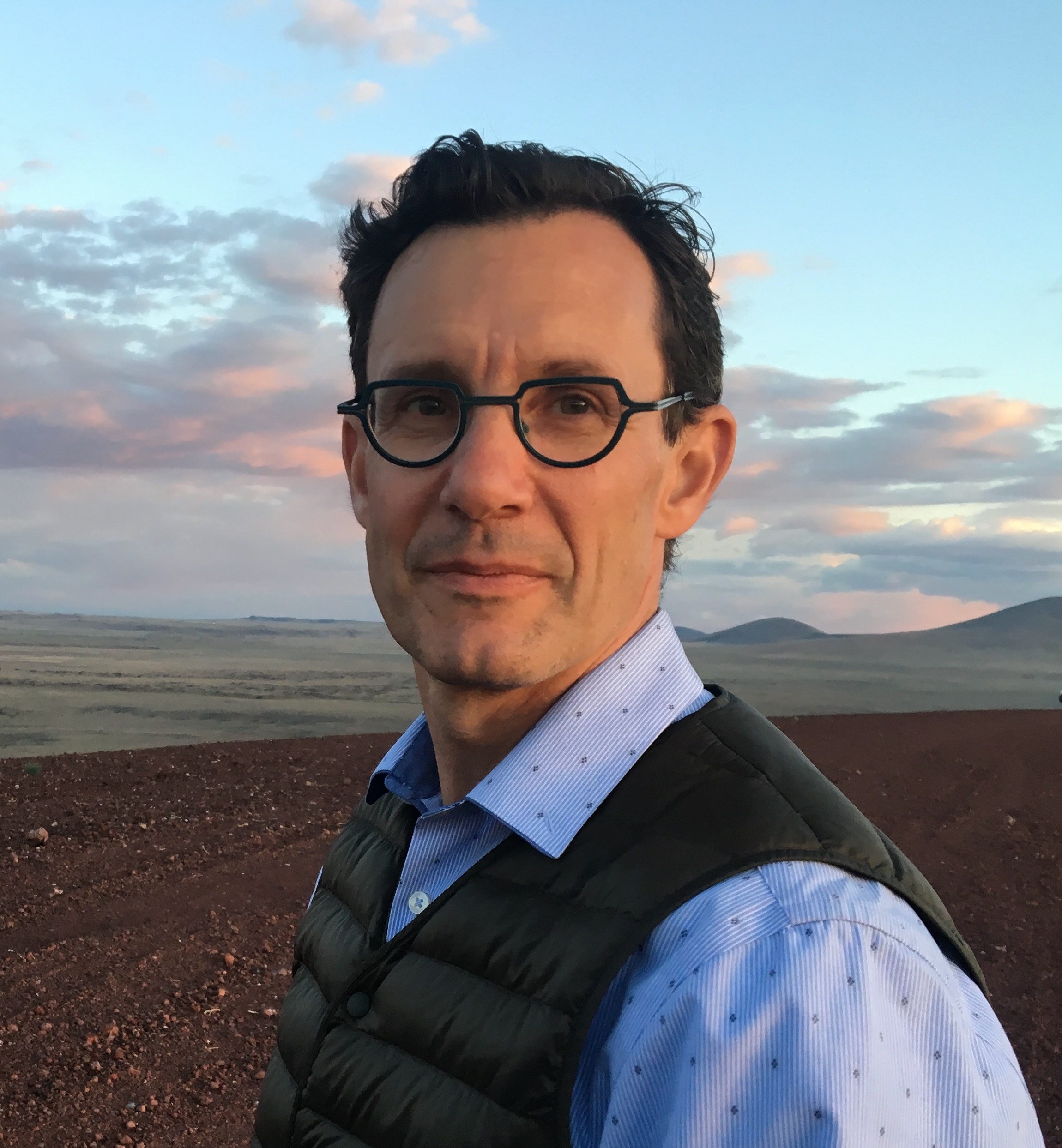
Hamilton's 21st and current president Steven J. Tepper

- Azel Backus, 1812–16
- Henry Davis, 1817–33
- Sereno Edwards Dwight, 1833–35
- Joseph Penney, 1835–39
- Simeon North, 1839–57
- Samuel Ware Fisher, 1858–66 - son of clergyman Samuel Fisher
- Samuel Gilman Brown, 1866–81
- Henry Darling (1824–1891), 1881–91 - graduated from Amherst College and Auburn Theological Seminary, pastor of the Fourth Presbyterian Church of Albany
- Melancthon Woolsey Stryker, class of 1872, 1892–1917
- Frederick Carlos Ferry, 1917–38
- William Harold Cowley, 1938–44
- David Worcester, 1945–47
- Thomas Brown Rudd, 1947–49
- Robert Ward McEwen, 1949–66
- Richard Watrous Couper, 1966–68 (acting)
- John Wesley Chandler, 1968–73
- Samuel Fisher Babbitt, 1968–78 (Kirkland College)
- J. Martin Carovano, 1974–88
- Harry C. Payne, 1988–93
- Eugene M. Tobin, 1993–2003
- Joan Hinde Stewart, 2003–2016
- David Wippman, 2016–2024
- Steven Tepper, 2024–

== Notable commencement speakers and honored guests ==
45th vice president of the United States and Nobel Peace Prize laureate Al Gore

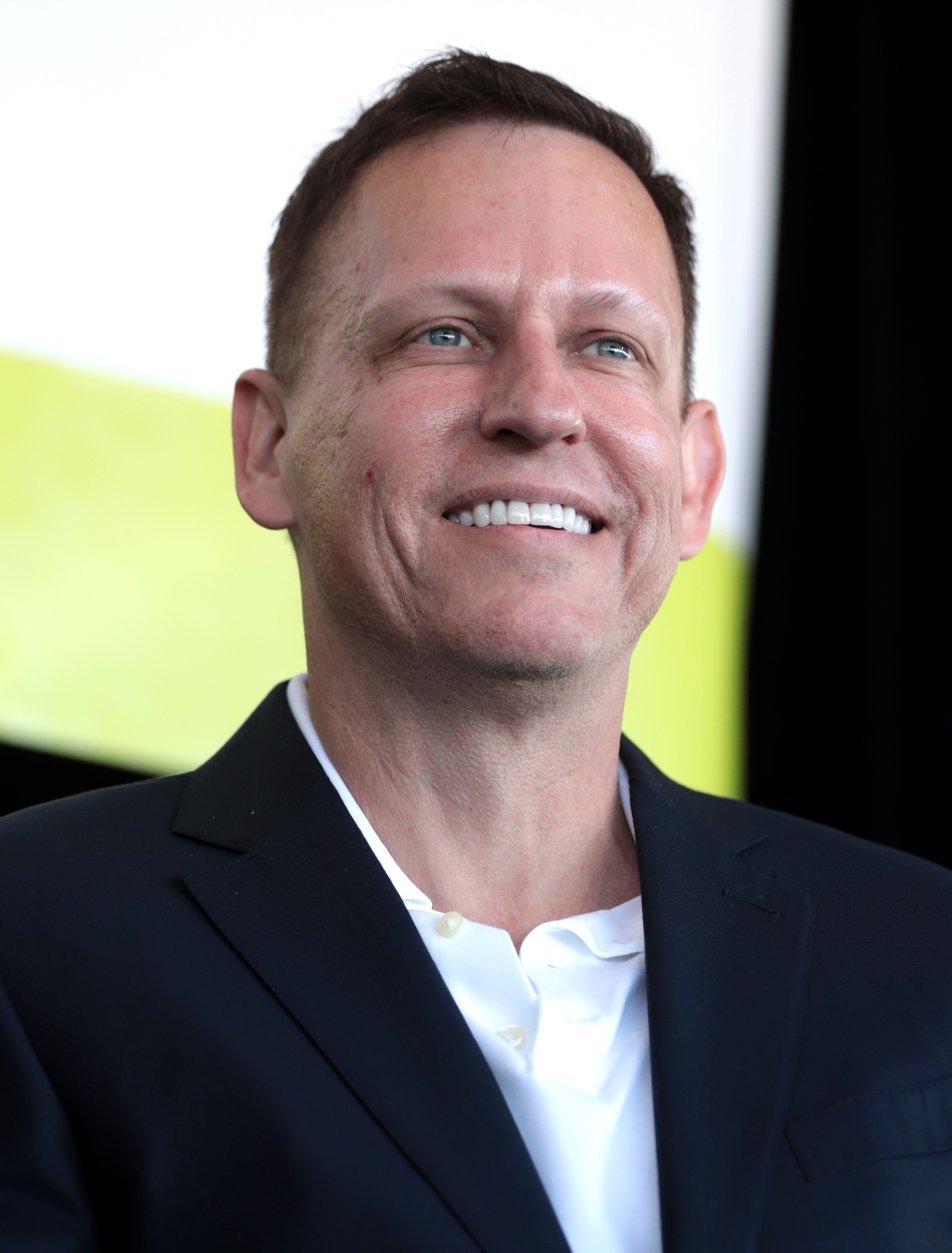
PayPal co-founder Peter Thiel

=== Commencement speakers ===
- 1996 – David McCullough
- 1997 – Bill Bradley
- 1998 – Jessica Mathews
- 1999 – Henry Louis Gates, Jr.
- 2000 – Brian Urquhart
- 2001 – Tom Vilsack ’72
- 2002 – Christine Todd Whitman
- 2003 – Jim Lehrer
- 2004 – Mike Castle ’61
- 2005 – Kurt Schmoke
- 2006 – Anna Quindlen
- 2007 – Richard Haass
- 2008 – Henry Paulson, Jr.
- 2009 – Cathie Black
- 2010 – Jeffrey Immelt
- 2011 – Al Gore
- 2012 – A.G. Lafley ’69
- 2013 – Thomas Tull ’92
- 2014 – Christopher Dickey
- 2015 – Philip Murphy
- 2016 – Peter Thiel
- 2017 – Charlie Baker
- 2018 – Darren Walker
- 2019 – Freeman Hrabowski
- 2021 – Ty Seidule
- 2020 – Marc Randolph ’81
- 2022 – Gillian Zucker ’90
- 2023 – Michelle J. Howard
- 2024 – Doug Jones
- 2025 – Bruce Mau

=== Sacerdote Great Names Series ===
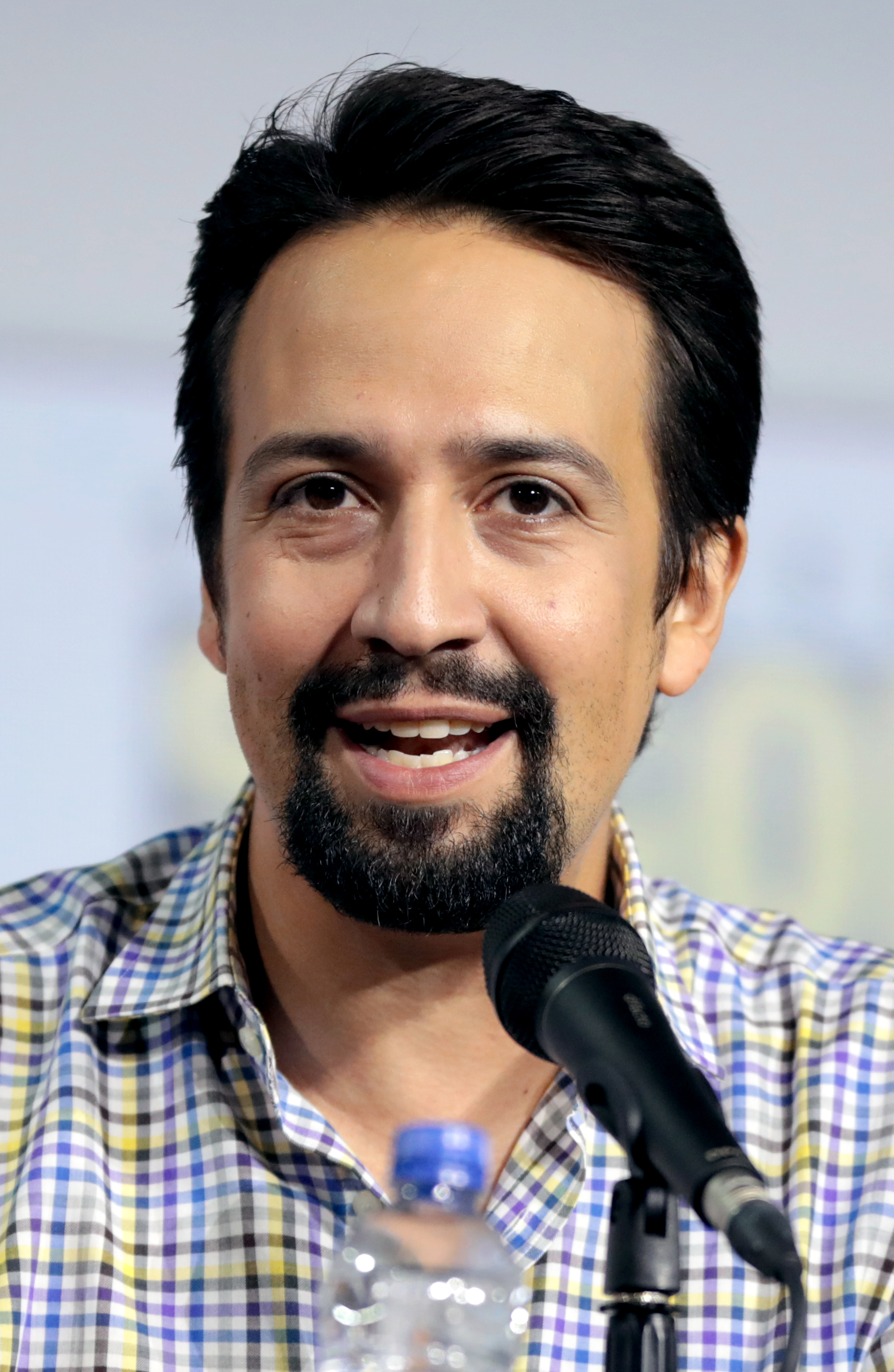
Pulitzer Prize- and Tony Award-winning creator of Hamilton and In The Heights Lin Manuel Miranda

44th President of the United States Barack Obama

Since 1996, Hamilton College has hosted the Sacerdote Great Names Series, bringing prominent public figures, intellectual leaders, and entertainers to campus. Below is a list of previous guests:

- Lin-Manuel Miranda
- Barack Obama
- Venus Williams
- Tina Fey
- Neil deGrasse Tyson
- Derek Jeter
- Hillary Rodham Clinton
- Jimmy Carter
- Bill Clinton
- Condoleezza Rice
- Jon Stewart
- Aretha Franklin
- Madeleine Albright
- Colin Powell
- Desmond Tutu
- Al Gore
- David Cameron
- Tom Brokaw
- Margaret Thatcher
- B.B. King
- Shirin Ebadi and Bernard Kouchner
- F.W. de Klerk
- Elie Wiesel
- Condoleezza Rice and Susan Rice
- James Carville & Mary Matalin
