= Joan Stewart =

Joan Stewart may refer to:

- Joan Beaufort, Queen of Scots (1404–1445), married James Stewart, the Black Knight of Lorn
- Joan Stewart, Countess of Morton (1428–1493), daughter of James I, King of Scotland
- Joan Hinde Stewart (born 1944), American academic administrator
- Joan Phillip (formerly Stewart, 1952–2026), Canadian politician
