= Museum of Political Corruption =

Coordinates: 42.659944°N 73.806580°W

The Museum of Political Corruption is an online museum that was originally planned to be in a physical space in Albany, New York. The online museum focuses on political corruption.

The museum is the idea of Bruce Roter, a composer and a professor of music at Albany's College of Saint Rose. His ideas for the as yet unfunded and unbuilt museum include installation of a revolving door, a "Lobby of Lobbyists," a "Tammany Lecture Hall" (referencing the corrupt, 19th century political machine Tammany Hall), a museum restaurant called the "Cozy Crony Cafe," and a gift shop selling a cookbook called the, "How to Cook Your Books' Cookbook." He hopes to open the museum in 2019.

Although the museum is intended to be amusing and ironic, it will also be the product of careful design backed by serious scholarship. The board of trustees and Board of Advisers include Thomas Bass, professor of journalism and literature at the University at Albany, SUNY, Philip Mark Plotch, professor of political science at Saint Peter's University, Frank Anechiarico, professor of government at Hamilton College, Sarah Rodman of the Harvard graduate program in Museum studies, and Zephyr Teachout, one-time candidate for governor and professor at Fordham Law School.

The proposal is backed by Albany Mayor Kathy Sheehan and Albany Times Union columnist Chris Churchill, who hope that it will bring tourism to the city.

The museum was recognized by the Cooperstown Graduate Program in Museum Studies as an "emerging institution." It is a registered a 501(c)(3) and it received a five-year provisional charter from the New York Board of Regents in October, 2015.

Since 2017, the museum annually has honored journalists with the Nellie Bly award for investigative reporting. Winners include Susanne Craig (2017), Jodi Kantor and Megan Twohey (2018), Jim Heaney (2019), Jane Mayer (2020), Alex Gibney (2021), Jerry Mitchell (2022), Anna Wolfe (2023), ProPublica staff (2024), and Glenn Kessler (2025).
