= Charles Heyd =

Charles Heyd may refer to:

- Charles G. Heyd (1884–1970), American surgeon
- Charles Bernhard Heyd (1842–1929), Canadian parliamentarian, grocer and fiddler
