= Kuharić =

Kuharić is a Croatian surname derived from the occupation of kuhar, i.e., "cook". Its variants include Kuharic and Kuharich (phonetical).

It is most common in the Zlatar area of the Central Croatia. It is mentioned in the 1906 "Yearbook and Directory of Literary Society of St. Jerome".

It may refer to:

- Franjo Kuharić (1919-2002), Croatian Catholic cardinal
- Bill Kuharich, American professional football executive
- Joe Kuharich (1917-1981), American football player and coach
- Katharine Kuharic
- Lary Kuharich (1945-2016), American football coach
