= Robert Livingston Allen =

American linguist and professor

Robert Livinston Allen (1916 – October 9, 1982), was an American professor of linguistics and education at Teachers College, Columbia University known for his development of Sector Analysis, a grammatical system used in the teaching and analysis of languages in the United States and around the world.

Born in 1916 in Hamadan, Iran, the son of Presbyterian missionaries, Robert Allen was educated at Phillips Exeter Academy and graduated as valedictorian from Hamilton College where he was a member of Phi Beta Kappa. He received his MA (1953) and PhD (1962) in Teaching of English with an emphasis on linguistics from Teachers College, Columbia University, New York, New York.

== Teaching career ==
Allen began his teaching career in 1938 at Robert College in Istanbul, Turkey. After teaching in Turkey, Afghanistan, Burma, and Indonesia, he joined the faculty of Teachers College in 1959, where he served as the chair of the Department of Languages, Literature, Speech and Theatre from 1965 to 1969. There he met his second wife, Doris A.(née Condon Stotts) Allen who served on the faculty from 1965 to 1975. In recognition of his special gifts as a teacher, his work as a scholar, and his contribution to his profession, Allen was awarded a special professorship at Teachers College in 1976. He also held Fulbright Lectureships in Burma (1953–1954) and in Tehran, Iran (1978).

He was active in the founding of Teachers of English to Speakers of Other Languages (TESOL) as an independent organization along with his first wife Virginia French Allen. He was a member of the English Teaching Advisory Panel for the U.S. Information Agency and a member of the Commission on the English Language for the National Council of Teachers of English. Other organizations with which he was affiliated were the Linguistic Society of America and the International Reading Association. Allen also served on the editorial board of WORD, the publication of the International Linguistic Association.

== Development of Sector Analysis ==
Allen was committed to the use of linguistic theory in teaching English in three major areas: reading, writing, and teaching English to speakers of other languages. He is best known for his work with the English verb in The Verb System of Present-Day American English (Mouton and Company 1966), and for his development of Sector Analysis, a structural grammatical system that has been used in language analysis and teaching around the world, a synopsis of which appears in English Grammars and English Grammar (Charles Scribner's 1972).

He also published articles, made presentations, and wrote monographs on a variety of subjects, including Time-Orientation and Time-Relationship in English, The Expression of Emphasis in Present-Day English, and Sector Analysis: From Sentence to Morpheme in English.

== X-word Grammar ==
In education, Allen's concepts have endured as X-word Grammar, which teaches the simplicity and predictability of English as seen through Sector Analysis in contrast to traditional English grammar methods that are still based on a comparison of English with Latin. X-word grammar has been applied to the teaching of English to speakers of other languages, to teaching writing in college level and business writing courses, in remedial English classes for native speakers, and in writing classes for the deaf.

== Bibliography ==
- Allen, Virginia French., and Robert Livingston Allen. Review Exercises for English as a Foreign Language,. New York: Crowell, 1961. Print.
- Allen, Robert L., Virginia French Allen, and Margaret Shute. English Sounds and Their Spellings; a Handbook for Teachers and Students. New York: Crowell, 1966. Print.
- Allen, Robert L. The Verb System of Present-Day American English, Series: Janua Linguarum, Series Practica / Studia Memoriae Nicolai van Wijk dedicata 24; The Hague: Mouton and Company, 1966. Reprinted by De Gruyter, ISBN 978-90-279-3430-7
- Allen, Robert L, Doris Stotts, Mary Hiatt, Edward M. Ouchi. Discovery: A Linguistic Approach to Writing. New York: Noble and Noble, 1967. Print.
- Allen, Robert L, Doris Stotts, Mary Hiatt, Edward M. Ouchi. Exploration: A Linguistic Approach to Writing. New York: Noble and Noble, 1967. Print.
- Allen, Robert L. English Grammar and English Grammars. New York: Charles Scribner's Sons, 1972. Print.
- Allen, Robert L. Boinguage. Communication Lines; Newsletter of the Department of the Teaching of English and Foreign Languages, Teachers College, Columbia University (1957). Print.
- Allen, Robert L. Sector Analysis: From Sentence to Morpheme in English. Monograph Series on Languages and Linguistics 20 (1967): 159–74. ' (PDF)
- Allen, Robert L. The Use of Rapid Drills in the Teaching of English to Speakers of Other Languages. TESOL Quarterly 1st ser. 6.March (1972): 13–32. Print.
