= David M. Solomon =

American investment banker (born 1962)

David Solomon
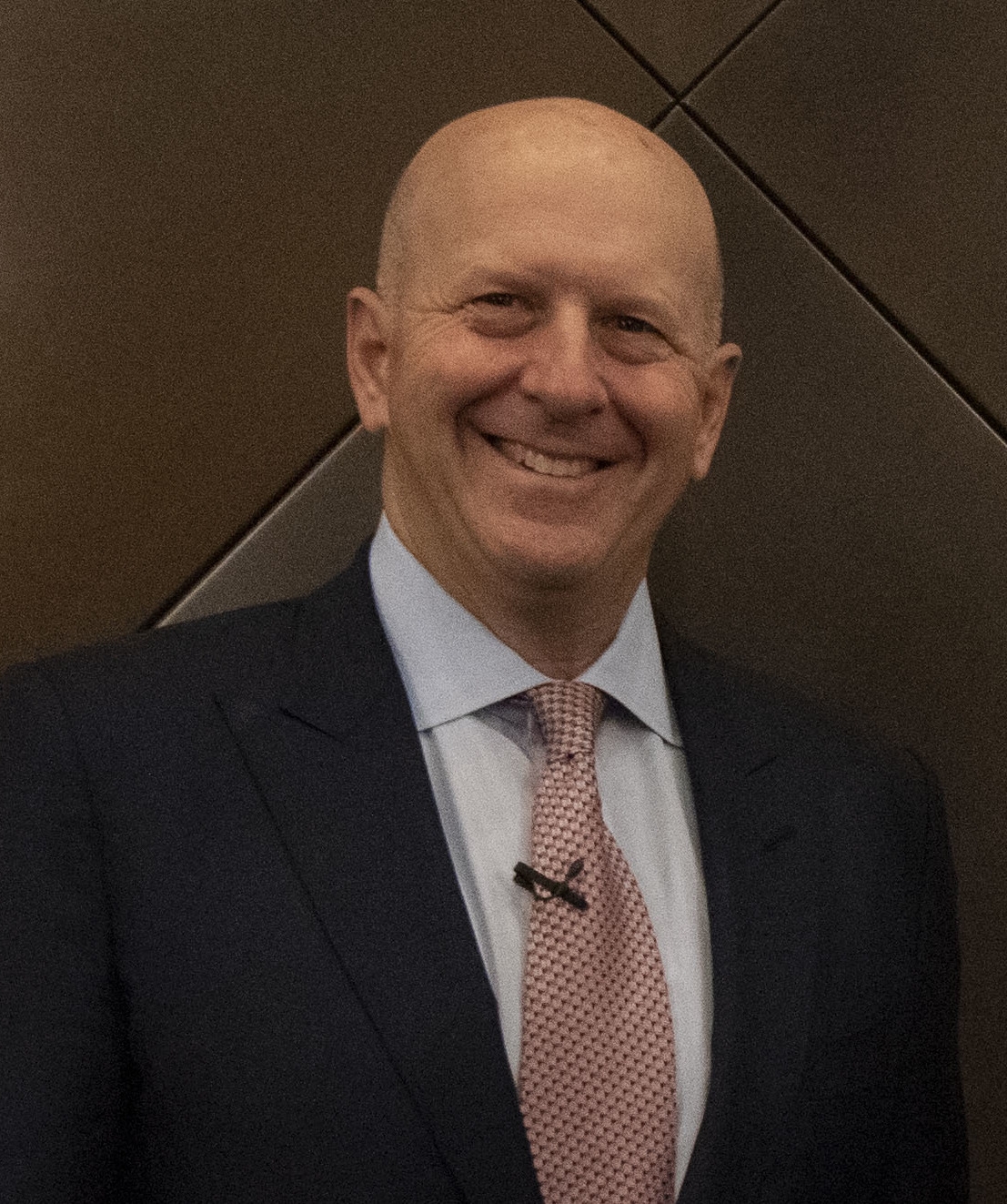
- Solomon in 2019
- Born: David Michael Solomon; January 17, 1962 (age 64); Hartsdale, New York, U.S.
- Education: Hamilton College (BA)
- Title: Chairman and CEO of Goldman Sachs; Chairman of the board of trustees, Hamilton College
- Term: October 2018 – July 2021 -
- Predecessor: Lloyd Blankfein
- Spouse: Mary Solomon (m. 1989; div. 2018)
- Children: 2

David Michael Solomon (born January 17, 1962) is an American investment banker who has been chief executive officer (CEO) of Goldman Sachs since October 2018 and chairman since January 2019.

Before assuming his role as CEO, Solomon was president and chief operating officer (COO) from January 2017 to September 2018, and was joint head of the investment banking division from July 2006 to December 2016. Solomon formally succeeded Lloyd Blankfein, the previous CEO, on October 1, 2018, and was named chairman after Blankfein's retirement.

Solomon also recreationally creates electronic dance music (EDM). (Note: His stage name abbreviates disc jockey without the periods (i.e. 'DJ' as opposed to 'D.J.'). When he releases records or remixes songs he is simply credited as D-Sol. His stage name is a portmanteau of his first name and surname.) He has performed at nightclubs and music festivals around New York, Miami and The Bahamas.

== Early life and education ==
Solomon was born in Hartsdale, New York to a Jewish family. His father, Alan Solomon, was an executive vice president of a small publishing company, and his mother, Sandra, worked as an audiology supervisor. He grew up in Scarsdale, New York, where he attended Edgemont Junior-Senior High School and worked at a local Baskin-Robbins before working as a camp counselor in New Hampshire.

Solomon attended Hamilton College in Clinton, New York, where he earned a Bachelor of Arts degree in Political Science. While there, he played on the rugby team and was chairman of the college's Alpha Delta Phi chapter.

== Career ==
After graduating, he applied to Goldman Sachs for a two-year analyst position but was rejected, leading him to apply to Irving Trust, which he has referred to as a "graduate school at [a] bank."

After Irving Trust, he went to work for Drexel Burnham in 1986. At Drexel Burnham he first worked as a commercial paper salesman, but later transitioned to junk bonds. His exposure to high-yield debt prompted him to join Bear Stearns. At Bear Stearns he was charged with leading the junk bonds division and selling higher-risk bonds. On one occasion, he assisted a struggling movie theater company in Dallas, Texas, to raise money through a "complicated bond transaction."

=== Goldman Sachs ===
Solomon worked with a variety of Goldman Sachs managers during the late 1990s which inspired his move to the firm in 1999 to work with their leveraged finance team as a partner, aged 37. His move from Bear Stearns was "shocking" to contemporaries who believed him to be on the "leadership track at Bear." Starting in 2006, he was promoted to and spent the next 10 years leading Goldman's investment banking division. In July 2007, he secured the initial public offering (IPO) of LuLulemon Athletica wearing a maroon blazer and sweatpants, a sampling of the company's clothing to "throw everyone off" in a suit-required meeting. During his time as head, he implemented "year-end compensation roundtables" where he would pepper the executives with questions about their business practices in order to "weed out under-performers." Upon his departure, he was credited with professionalizing the investment banking division and doubling profit margins from 11% to 22% with sales rising by 70%. In April 2014, Sheldon Adelson, a client of his from Drexel Burnham, offered Solomon operational control over the Las Vegas Sands casinos. Solomon declined the offer because Adelson "wasn’t willing to give up day-to-day control, and [he] didn’t want to be an understudy." Despite Goldman Sachs not disclosing his total compensation packages, SEC and IRS filings indicate that Solomon was paid a base salary of US$1.85 million with an award of restricted stock worth about $10 million in January 2015.

After Gary Cohn resigned from Goldman to become the Chief Economic Advisor to Donald Trump, then President of the United States, Solomon was elevated to president and co-chief operating officer along with Harvey Schwartz in December 2016. In a series of interviews in October 2017, Solomon detailed his advice for students and future employees at Goldman: know how to write and speak publicly, know accounting, and never lose sight of what you are passionate about. Under Solomon's leadership, the bank has increased pay for programmers, loosened dress codes, modernized computer systems, instituted video interviews, and created a "real-time performance review" system for new employees. Solomon received an $11.85 million compensation package in January 2017 and January 2018. It was estimated that Solomon holds 224,030 (0.059%) shares of Goldman Sachs Group (GS) which was valued at $58 million in January 2018. In March 2020, Solomon was granted some US$27.5 million in compensation. This was made up of his base pay, which was a $2 million salary, as well as a $7.65 million cash bonus. On top of that, he also was granted $17.85 million in long-term incentives.

On March 12, 2018, Goldman announced that Schwartz, the company's co-chief operating officer and president, would be resigning, leaving Solomon as the second-in-command. Hours after the announcement, media outlets–both domestic and international–informally designated Solomon as Lloyd Blankfein's sole heir apparent. At a board meeting on February 21, 2018, Blankfein expressed an interest and preference for Solomon to succeed him. Solomon has repeatedly advocated for a reformation of Goldman's company culture. He expressed an interest in lowering the maximum hours worked during normal business days from somewhere near 90 hours a week, to somewhere near 70 to 75 hours a week, when not actively engaged in closing a deal. Prior to assuming the company's presidency, he tracked the hours worked by his subordinates and frequently stepped in to send employees home. Solomon took office as the chief executive officer (CEO) of the firm on October 1, 2018.

In 2021, Goldman Sachs announced it would be slashing Solomon's 2020 pay by 39.6% for the bank's role in the 1MDB scandal, causing Goldman to pay nearly $3.2 billion in October 2020 to government officials in four countries to close an investigation into the work the bank performed for 1MDB. Solomon received a $27.5 million compensation package in 2019 and was given a $17.5 million package for 2020.

Solomon spoke at the November 2022 Global Financial Leaders' Investment Summit, with the Hong Kong Democracy Council claiming that his presence, along with other financial executives, legitimized the Hong Kong government's whitewashing of the erosion of freedoms in the city. Several members of Congress also warned that US financial executives should not attend the Summit, saying "Their presence only serves to legitimise the swift dismantling of Hong Kong's autonomy, free press and the rule of law by Hong Kong authorities acting along with the Chinese Communist Party."

As of 2025, Solomon is a member of The Business Council in Washington, D.C.

In 2025, Solomon's total compensation from Goldman Sachs was $118.9 million.

== Music ==
Solomon performs regularly as a disc jockey under the name "DJ D-Sol," producing a variety of electronic dance music (EDM). He has performed at nightclubs and music festivals around New York, Miami and the Bahamas. Solomon maintains the Instagram account "@davidsolomonmusic" to catalogue his projects as a music producer. In June 2018, he released a cover of the Fleetwood Mac song, "Don't Stop." The song was originally played on Sirius XM's BPM: Electronic Dance Music Hits the previous January. "Don't Stop" was listed in Spotify's 263,361-follower playlist "Happy Summer Beats." His Spotify profile has 550,000 monthly listeners, with his debut single garnering 8 million listens. Shortly after his debut release, Solomon opened a SoundCloud account where he posts extended musical sets and concert performances. His most recent release, "Someone Like You" peaked at #4 on the Billboard Dance Club Chart in November 2020.

=== Payback Records ===
Solomon founded Payback Records in December 2018 in partnership with Big Beat/Atlantic Records. All proceeds from the label are directed towards charitable causes relating to addiction, hunger relief and fighting COVID-19. Solomon releases all of his original music through Payback Records.

Payback released the single "Break This Habit" featuring Kiko Bun by house DJ Oliver Heldens, in partnership with Heldeep Records.

=== Discography ===
Discography
Title	Year released	Song details
"Don't Stop"	2018	Label: Crowd Records
"Feel Alive"	2019	Label: Payback Records; Remixes by: Morgan Page, LA Riots, Dzeko, Speaker of the House
"Rescue Me" (feat. Alex Newell)	2019	Label: Payback Records; Remixes by: Country Club Martini Crew, Mahalo, Ralphi Rosario, Kandy, Kue; Appears as the theme song for the VH1 television show To Catch a Beautician; Is an updated version of the Fontella Bass song of the same name
Dzeko & DJ D-Sol - "Down on It" (feat. Kool & the Gang)	2019	Label: Payback Records
"Electric" (feat. Hayley May)	2020	Label: Payback Records; Remixes by: Danny Quest, Fangs, Crush Club
"Someone Like You" (feat. Gia Koka)	2020	Label: Payback Records; Remixes by: Disco Killerz, Liquid Todd, Azello
"Only a Fool" (DJ D-Sol Remix)	2020	Label: Atlantic Records
"Learn to Love Me" (ft. Ryan Tedder)	2021	Label: Payback Records
"Dreaming" (feat. SMBDY) [VIPMix]	2021	Label: Payback Records
Jennifer Lopez - "On My Way" (David Solomon Remix)	2022	Label: Payback Records
Whitney Houston - "I Wanna Dance With Somebody (Who Loves Me)" (David Solomon Remix)	2022	Label: Arista Records
"Heatwave" (feat. RobbieJay)	2022	Label: Payback Records
"Cross Your Mind"	2022	Label: Payback Records

=== Chart positions ===
List of charting singles
Title	Peak chart positions		
Title	Billboard Dance/Mix Show Airplay	Billboard Dance Club Songs	Billboard Hot Dance/Electronica
"Don't Stop"	39	—	—
"Feel Alive"	4	—	—
"Rescue Me"	—	4	37
"Someone Like You"	4	—	—
"—" denotes releases that did not chart or were not released in that region.

=== Performances ===
Solomon has performed at many events including the Electronic Music Awards in Los Angeles in 2017 and a 2020 Sports Illustrated Super Bowl Event in Miami along with Marshmello and Black Eyed Peas. On April 9, 2018, he performed a remix of "The Pink Panther Theme" at a charity event for the opioid epidemic hosted by Hamilton College. He has shared the stage with many notable DJs including Paul Oakenfold and Galantis. In 2020, he appeared as himself in a cameo on the Showtime series Billions.

In May 2022, Solomon performed at the silent disco of Bottle Rock in Napa, CA. In July of the same year, Solomon took the stage at the Lollapalooza music festival. All proceeds from his appearances were donated to charity.

=== Safe & Sound charity concert ===
On July 25, 2020, Solomon was the opening act for the Chainsmokers at a charity concert, called "Safe & Sound" that was meant to be a future example of COVID-19 pandemic audience safety. The event was investigated by the state of New York health authorities for "rampant" violations of social distancing guidelines. A Goldman Sachs spokesperson said Solomon left before the show ended.

== Personal life ==
Solomon is Jewish. He married Mary Elizabeth Solomon (née Coffey) in 1989 when they were both 27 years old in Bernardsville, New Jersey. They have two daughters. They divorced in early 2018. He has resided in The San Remo on the Upper West Side of Manhattan in New York City from 2002 onward. He listed the apartment for $24 million in May 2016. He purchased a 13,000-square-foot estate in Aspen, Colorado in 2004 for $4 million and listed it for $36 million in July 2016.

In January 2018, Solomon discovered that a personal assistant had stolen around 500 bottles from his rare wine collection, among them seven from the French estate Domaine de la Romanee-Conti. The personal assistant, Nicolas DeMeyer, was arrested in late January and indicted for the theft of $1.2 million worth of wine. On October 9, 2018, Nicolas DeMeyer committed suicide by leaping to his death from the 33rd floor window of the Carlyle Hotel, minutes after he was scheduled to appear before a Manhattan judge in relation to the alleged wine theft.

Solomon has served on Hamilton College's board of trustees since 2005. He was elected as chairman of the board starting July 1, 2021. He is on the board of directors of the Robin Hood Foundation, a charitable organization which attempts to alleviate problems caused by poverty in New York City.

== See also ==
- List of club DJs
- List of Hamilton College people

== Explanatory notes ==
Business positions
Preceded by Lloyd Blankfein	Chairman of Goldman Sachs; 2018–present	Incumbent
Preceded by Lloyd Blankfein	CEO of Goldman Sachs; 2018–present	Incumbent
