= Steve Wulf =

American print editor

- Born: Steven Ira Wulf; December 4, 1950 (age 75); New York City, New York, United States
- Education: Hamilton College
- Occupations: Magazine editor and book writer

Steven Ira "Steve" Wulf (born December 4, 1950) is an American magazine journalist, editor, and book writer. A former executive editor at ESPN The Magazine, Wulf continues to write for ESPN The Magazine as well as ESPN.com. Before joining ESPN, Wulf worked for numerous publications, including The Evening Sun in Norwich, NY, Sports Illustrated, Entertainment Weekly, The Economist, and Time. While working at SI as an associate writer, he met his wife, Jane Bachman Wulf, who was the magazine's chief of reporters.

== Early life and education ==
Wulf was born in New York City, New York, and raised in Troy, New York.

He attended high school at The Albany Academy, in Albany, New York; and graduated from Hamilton College, in Clinton, NY, with a degree in English. After graduating from Hamilton, Wulf climbed into his '69 Chevy Malibu and visited every newspaper in the Northeast until he found a job.

== Career ==
Wulf found his first job at The Evening Sun, a local newspaper in Norwich, NY. As Wulf once recalled in a story he wrote for Sports Illustrated, he spent "15 months as a—no—the sportswriter for The Evening Sun." In one particularly humorous moment during the slow summer months, Wulf once quoted himself in the recap of a local softball game. After a 29-5 victory, Wulf was the only player to go hitless and, having no choice but to interview the player, he "quoted" him as saying, "I went through a two-game batting slump in one night. But I think that I, more than anyone, was responsible for keeping the score down."

After leaving Norwich, Wulf migrated south and worked for the Fort Lauderdale News as its horse-racing writer. He later did freelance work for newspapers in Boston before becoming a fact-checker at Sports Illustrated. He worked his way up to becoming a staff writer, and then later moved to Time Magazine. When ESPN decided to start its own magazine, Wulf left Time to become one of ESPN The Magazine's original editors.

=== Books ===
In addition to his forty years of newspaper and magazine writing, Wulf has published various books including:

- 0:01: Parting Shots from the World of Sports
- Baseball Anecdotes
- I Was Right On Time
- Legends of the Field
- The Mighty Book Of Sports

=== Film and television ===
Wulf consulted in the making of the documentary television series Baseball, directed by Ken Burns, and has appeared on numerous episodes of ESPN SportsCentury as well as ESPN's 30 for 30 series.

=== Michael Jordan article ===
In March 1994, Wulf wrote an article about Michael Jordan's minor-league-baseball career, which was featured on the cover with the headline "Bag It Michael". Due to the incendiary headline, Jordan cut off official communication with Sports Illustrated and his silence continues to this day.

=== 30 for 30 ===
Wulf also appeared numerous times in 30 for 30, a documentary series on ESPN television. He was interviewed for Silly Little Game, a documentary about the genesis of rotisserie league baseball, as well as Jordan Rides the Bus. In Jordan, Wulf recounts his controversial Sports Illustrated article about Michael's attempt to play baseball. He admits to being too critical of Jordan, but also reveals that he visited the legendary basketball player a second time and wrote a story about how he was showing signs of major-league potential. Sports Illustrated did not run the second story.

== Personal ==
Wulf has been married since October, 1984. He and his wife Jane have two sons, Bo and John, as well as twin daughters, Eve and Elizabeth. Wulf often writes about his children and boasts on his Twitter page that he is "the father of four pitchers."

== See also ==
- List of Hamilton College people
- List of people from New York City
