= Frank Trentmann =

Professor of history at London University

Frank Trentmann is a professor of history in the Department of History, Classics and Archaeology at Birkbeck College, University of London. He is a specialist in the history of consumption.

== Career ==
Trentmann is professor of history in the Department of History, Classics and Archaeology at Birkbeck College, University of London. He was educated at Hamburg University, the London School of Economics and Political Science, and at Harvard University, where he completed his PhD. He has taught at Princeton University and at Bielefeld University. He was Fernand Braudel Senior Fellow at the European University Institute.

Trentmann won the Whitfield Prize from the Royal Historical Society for his 2008 book Free Trade Nation: Consumption, Civil Society and Commerce in Modern Britain (Oxford University Press).

== Research ==
Trentmann is a specialist in the history of consumption. He was director of the Cultures of Consumption research programme, which received £5 million of funding from the Economic and Social Research Council and the Arts and Humanities Research Council.

== Selected publications ==
- Out of the Darkness: The Germans, 1942–2022 (Knopf, 2024)
- Empire of Things – How we became a world of consumers from the fifteenth century to the twenty-first (UK: Allen Lane/Penguin 2016; US: HarperCollins 2016; German edn: DVA 2017; Chinese: Ginkgo 2017).
- Free Trade Nation: Consumption, Civil Society and Commerce in Modern Britain (Oxford: Oxford University Press, 2008).
- The Oxford Handbook of the History of Consumption, editor (Oxford University Press, 2012).
- Elizabeth Shove, Frank Trentmann and Richard Wilk (eds), Time, Consumption, and Everyday Life (Oxford: Berg, 2009).
- Is Free Trade Fair? New Perspectives on the World Trading System, editor (Smith Institute, London 2009).
- Food and Globalization: Consumption, Markets and Politics in the Modern World, edited with Alexander Nützenadel, (Oxford and New York: Berg, 2008).
- Governance, Citizens, and Consumers: Agency and Resistance in Contemporary Politics, edited with Mark Bevir, (Basingstoke: Palgrave Macmillan, 2007).
- (Co-edited with Philippa Levine and Kevin Grant) Beyond Sovereignty: Britain, Empire, and Transnationalism, 1880–1950 (Palgrave Macmillan, 2007).
- Citizenship and Consumption, edited with Kate Soper, (Palgrave Macmillan, 2007).
- Consuming Cultures, Global Perspectives: Historical Trajectories, Transnational Exchanges, edited with John Brewer, (Oxford and New York: Berg, 2006).
- The Making of the Consumer: Knowledge, Power and Identity in the Modern World (Editor), (Oxford and New York: Berg, 2006).
- Food and Conflict in Europe in the Age of the Two World Wars, edited with Flemming Just, (Basingstoke: Palgrave Macmillan, 2006).
- Civil Society: A Reader in History, Theory and Global Politics (edited with John A. Hall), (Basingstoke: Palgrave Macmillan, 2005).
- Worlds of Political Economy: Knowledge and Power in the Nineteenth and Twentieth Centuries (edited with Martin J Daunton), (Basingstoke: Palgrave Macmillan, 2004).
- Markets in Historical Contexts: Ideas and Politics in the Modern World (Cambridge: Cambridge University Press, 2004), co-edited with Mark Bevir (Chinese edition in press).
- Critiques of Capital in Modern Britain and America: Transatlantic Exchanges, co-edited with Mark Bevir (London: Palgrave Macmillan, 2002).
- Paradoxes of Civil Society: New Perspectives on Modern German and British History, (Editor), (Oxford and New York: Berghahn Books, 2003, 2nd rev. paperback edition. 1st edition 2000).
