= Philippa Levine =

British historian & academic

Philippa Judith Amanda Levine, FRAI, FRHistS, is a historian of the British Empire, gender, race, science and technology. She has spent most of her career in the United States and has been Mary Helen Thompson Centennial Professor in the Humanities (2010–17) and Walter Prescott Webb Professor in History and Ideas (since 2017) at the University of Texas at Austin.

== Biography ==
Philippa Judith Amanda Levine grew up in the United Kingdom and studied at King's College, Cambridge, from 1976 to 1979, when she graduated with a Bachelor of Arts (BA) degree in history; she then completed a doctorate (DPhil) at St Antony's College, Oxford, from 1979 to 1984 (supported firstly by a postgraduate studentship from King's College, Cambridge, and then from 1980 with a Department of Education and Science research studentship). The DPhil was awarded for her thesis "The amateur and the professional: antiquarians, historians and archaeologists in nineteenth century England, 1838–1886", which was published as her first book in 1986.

Levine's first academic post was as a lecturer in history at the University of East Anglia (1983–85). She then spent two years as a research fellow in women's studies at Flinders University of South Australia, before moving to Florida State University as an assistant professor in 1987. Three years later, she was promoted to associate professor. In 1991, she moved to the University of Southern California as an associate professor of history and became a full professor in 1994. She was appointed Mary Helen Thompson Centennial Professor in the Humanities at the University of Texas at Austin in 2010. Since 2017, she has been Walter Prescott Webb Professor in History and Ideas at the University of Texas at Austin.

Levine was elected a Fellow of the Royal Historical Society (FRHistS) in 1994, and a Fellow of the Royal Anthropological Institute of Great Britain and Ireland (FRAI) in 2014.

== Research ==
Levine's research has focused on the history of the British Empire, race and gender, and science, medicine and society. Her publications include:

- The Amateur and the Professional. Historians, Antiquarians and Archaeologists in Victorian England, 1838–1886 (Cambridge: Cambridge University Press, 1986)
- Victorian Feminism 1850–1900 (London: Hutchinson Education, 1987)
- Feminist Lives in Victorian England. Private Roles and Public Commitment (Oxford: Basil Blackwell, 1990)
- (co-edited with Laura E. Nym Mayhall and Ian Christopher Fletcher) Women's Suffrage in the British Empire: Citizenship, Nation and Race (London: Routledge, 2000)
- Prostitution, Race and Politics: Policing Venereal Disease in the British Empire (New York: Routledge, 2003)
- (edited) Gender and Empire, Oxford History of the British Empire Companion Series (Oxford: Oxford University Press, 2004)
- (co-edited with Kevin Grant and Frank Trentmann) Beyond Sovereignty: Britain, Empire and Transnationalism, 1860–1950 (Basingstoke: Palgrave Macmillan, 2007)
- The British Empire, Sunrise to Sunset (Harlow: Longman Pearson 2007)
  - Italian translation: L'impero britannico (Bologna: Il Mulino, 2009)
- (co-edited with Susan Grayzel) Gender, Labour, War and Empire in Modern Britain: Essays on Modern Britain (Basingstoke: Palgrave Macmillan, 2009)
- (co-edited with Alison Bashford) The Oxford Handbook of the History of Eugenics (Oxford: Oxford University Press, 2010)
- (co-edited with John Marriott) The Ashgate Research Companion to Modern Imperial Histories (Farnham: Ashgate, 2012)
- Eugenics: A Very Short Introduction (New York: Oxford University Press, 2017)
