= Simeon North (educator) =

US college president

Simeon North (September 7, 1802 – February 9, 1884) was the fifth President of Hamilton College, from 1839 to 1857.

North was born in Berlin, Connecticut on September 7, 1802. He graduated from Yale College in 1825. At graduation he entered the Yale Divinity School, and there pursued a three years' course in theology, being engaged also during the greater part of this time as a Tutor at Yale. While in the Tutorship and considering a call to pastoral service, he was elected, May 1829, to the chair of ancient languages in Hamilton College, Clinton, Oneida County, New York. His ten years of valuable service as a professor there were followed by his election to the presidency of the same institution in 1839. He held this position with credit to himself and with advantage to the College, until his resignation in September 1857. He lived in retirement in Clinton, though still connected with the College as one of its Trustees, until his death, after a week's illness, of pneumonia, February 9, 1884, aged 81.

He married, Apr. 21, 1835, Frances Harriet, daughter of Professor Thomas Hubbard, M.D., of Yale College, who died Jan. 21, 1881. Their only child died in early boyhood.

The degree of Doctor of Divinity was conferred upon him by Wesleyan University in 1849,—he having received ordination on May 25, 1842,—and the degree of Doctor of Laws by Western Reserve College in 1842.
