= Marianne Janack =

American philosopher

- Born: 1964 (age 61–62); Syracuse, NY
- Known for: American philosophy, philosophy and literature, feminist philosophy, philosophy of science, metaphysics
- Awards: National Science Foundation Grant, Phi Beta Kappa Romanell Professor of Philosophy

Academic background
- Education: Syracuse University (MA, PhD), Rainier Writing Workshop (MFA) Colgate University (BA)
- Doctoral advisor: Linda Alcoff

Academic work
- Discipline: philosophy
- Institutions: [[Hamilton College] [Brown University] [WPI]]

Marianne Janack is an American philosopher and John Stewart Kennedy Professor of Philosophy at Hamilton College. She is the president of the Richard Rorty Society. She was the Phi Beta Kappa Romanell Professor of Philosophy in 2017-18.

== Books ==
- What We Mean By Experience, Stanford University Press 2012
- Feminist Interpretations of Richard Rorty, Penn State University Press 2010
