= Hermann Carl George Brandt =

Hermann Carl George Brandt (1850–1920) was a German-American scholar who published German grammars and German-English dictionaries among other works.

== Biography ==
Brandt was born at Vilsen, Germany. He graduated in 1872 from Hamilton College in Clinton, New York, and was an instructor there from 1874 to 1876. From 1876 to 1882, he was associate professor of German at the Johns Hopkins University. In 1883, he was appointed professor of German language and literature at Hamilton, and remained in that position for the rest of his life. His publications include a German-English and English-German dictionary, an edition of Lessing's Nathan der Weise (1879), a German grammar (1884; several subsequent editions), and a useful German reader (1889).
