= David Wippman =

American lawyer

20th President of Hamilton College
- In office July 1, 2016 – June 30, 2024
- Preceded by: Joan Hinde Stewart
- Succeeded by: Steven Tepper

Personal details
- Born: 1954 (age 70–71)
- Education: Princeton University (BA); Yale University (MA, JD)

David Wippman (born December 1954) is an American lawyer who served as the 20th president of Hamilton College in Clinton, New York. Sociologist Steven Tepper was announced as Wippman's successor effective July 1, 2024.

== Education ==
Wippman graduated summa cum laude with an A.B. in English from Princeton University in 1976 after completing a 143-page long senior thesis titled "Malory and the Fall of Camelot" about Thomas Malory.

He earned an M.A. in English literature from Yale University, and a J.D. from Yale Law School. During law school, Wippman served as the editor-in-chief of the Yale Law Journal. He also clerked for Wilfred Feinberg, a Judge of the United States Court of Appeals for the Second Circuit.

== Career ==
After graduating from law school, Wippman practiced law in Washington, D.C., specializing in international law and political consulting. He served as vice provost of Cornell University for international relations and dean of the Cornell Law School. Prior to serving as president of Hamilton College, Wippman was dean of the University of Minnesota Law School. He has also been a visiting professor at Ulster University. Wippman took office as president on July 1, 2016, succeeding Joan Hinde Stewart.

On March 12, 2020, Wippman cancelled in-person instruction at Hamilton College for the rest of the spring semester. On June 1, 2020, Wippman co-authored an opinion piece titled "How Colleges Can Keep the Coronavirus Off Campus" in The New York Times about returning students to campus in the fall 2020 semester.

Wippman has previously authored op-eds in The New York Times, The Hill, and Inside Higher Ed.

On May 16, 2023, Wippman announced his intention to retire on June 30, 2024.
