= Charles G. Heyd =

American surgeon

- Born: 27 August 1884; Brantford, Ontario, Canada
- Died: 4 February 1970; New York
- Occupation: Surgeon

Charles Gordon Heyd (27 August 1884 – 4 February 1970) was an American surgeon and president of the American Medical Association in 1936–1937.

== Biography ==
Heyd obtained a B.A. from the University of Toronto in 1905 and M.D. from University of Buffalo in 1909. During World War I he served as a Major in France. Heyd was an opponent of compulsory health insurance and socialized medicine. Instead, he favoured voluntary medical insurance and public health testing.

Heyd was Director of Surgery at New York Post-Graduate Medical School and Hospital and Professor of Clinical Surgery at Columbia University. He was President of the United Medical Service (1948–1951). In 1932, he received the Legion of Honour of France. He wrote the Preface for Lloyd Paul Stryker's Courts and Doctors, published in 1932.

He was President of the American Medical Association (1936–1937). In 1937, Heyd was awarded honorary degree of doctor of science by Temple University. In 1940, Heyd noted that most infections of the neck have their origin in the oral cavity.

Heyd died on 4 February 1970.

== Opposition to water fluoridation ==
Heyd was an opponent of water fluoridation. He has been quoted as saying "I am appalled at the prospect of using water as a vehicle for drugs. Fluoride is a corrosive poison which will produce harm on a long-term basis".

Heyd's comment has been widely cited in anti-fluoridation literature as an argument from authority because he was a former President of the AMA. However, Heyd was President of the AMA for two years in the 1930s long before evidence of the effectiveness from fluoridation was available to examine. Since Heyd, no other AMA President has opposed fluoridation.

== Selected publications ==
- Liver and Its Relation to Chronic Abdominal Infection (1924)
- The Doctor in Court (1941)
