= Lloyd Paul Stryker =

American lawyer

Lloyd Paul Stryker (5 June 1885 – June 1955) was a 20th-century American attorney known as a "flamboyant criminal lawyer" and "perhaps the most celebrated criminal lawyer since Clarence Darrow", best known as chief of defense in the first criminal trial of Alger Hiss for perjury in 1949.

== Background ==
He was born on June 5, 1885, in Chicago to Melancthon Woolsey Stryker (a Presbyterian minister) and Elizabeth Goss. He had five siblings. In 1906 (or 1907), he received a BA from Hamilton College, where his father was president. In 1909, he received an MA in law from New York Law School. In 1933, he received a Doctorate of Humane Letters.

== Career ==
In 1909, he was admitted to the New York bar. From 1910 to 1922, he was assistant district attorney in New York County. In 1914 (or 1912), he received the Republican nomination for judge of the New York City Court. He then formed the law firm of Whiteside and Stryker. He interrupted his career to serve in World War I successively as second lieutenant, first lieutenant and captain in field artillery for the United States Army.

In 1928, Stryker declined a chair in criminal law at Harvard University. In 1929, President Calvin Coolidge nominated him for a federal judgeship, but before his confirmation, President Herbert Hoover came into office and did not renominate him.

In 1930, Stryker renounced the Republican Party and went into practice by himself.

=== Hiss case ===
By 1947, Life magazine had published an article about him: "Trial Lawyer: Lloyd Paul Stryker is Archetype of Vanishing Courtroom Virtuoso". The author, Fred Rodell, wrote, "His close friend, the late Alexander Woollcott, once described Stryker as a 'curious mixture of Clarence Darrow, Demosthenes, the late Abe Levy, St. George, William Sylvanus Baxter Jr., and the bull of Bashan."

Most famously, Stryker was lead defense counsel in the first of two criminal cases for perjury against Alger Hiss (both held in New York City). Yale Law School's biographical dictionary states, "His skillful, ferocious, and relentless cross-examination of Whittaker Chambers... led to a hung jury." Irving Younger has called Stryker "the then-ablest criminal lawyer in practice" and "the preeminent criminal lawyer of his generation".

=== Later years ===
Stryker's practice dropped off after the Hiss Case.

== Personal life and death ==
Stryker's father was president of Hamilton College and his sister, Alida Livingston Stryker (1881–1951), married Elihu Root Jr., son of the Hamilton alumnus and trustee Elihu Root.

During the Great Depression, Stryker's use made popular the word "boondoggle".

Stryker married Katherine Traux; they had one daughter. He was an Episcopalian. He died in June 1955.

== Works ==
According to Younger, "Stryker was a very able writer. His work on the art of advocacy has, I think, never been surpassed and rarely equalled."

Books:

- Andrew Johnson—A Study in Courage (1929)
- Courts and Doctors (with a Preface by Charles G. Heyd, 1932)
- For The Defense (1947) (biography of Thomas Erskine)
- The Art of Advocacy (1954)

Articles:

- "Department of Amplification", New Yorker (December 25, 1937)
- "Successful Trial Tactics, by A.S. Cutler", Indiana Law Journal (Summer 1949)

== See also ==
- Thomas Francis Murphy

== External sources ==
- Getty Images
