= Kevin Grant (historian) =

American historian

Kevin Patrick Grant is an American academic historian specialising in modern Britain and Ireland, European imperialism, and international humanitarianism. He is the Edgar B. Graves Professor of History at Hamilton College, New York.

== Biography ==
Kevin Patrick Grant completed his Bachelor of Arts (BA) degree at the University of California, Berkeley, in 1988; he then completed a Master of Arts (MA) degree at the University of Chicago in 1991 before returning to Berkeley to carry out his doctoral studies (earning him a PhD in 1997). He received a Fulbright Research Scholarship to the United Kingdom in 1994–95 and then a Mellon Dissertation Fellowship in 1996–97. Subsequently, in 1997, he joined the faculty of Hamilton College, New York, as a Visiting Assistant Professor. He was made an assistant professor in 2000, an associate professor in 2004, and a professor by 2012. He was Chair of the History Department from 2015 to 2019 and Faculty chair between 2017 and 2019. He was appointed the Elias W. Leavenworth Professor of History in 2017, and then the Edgar B. Graves Professor of History in 2018.

== Research ==
Grant's research focuses on modern Britain and Ireland, European imperialism, and international humanitarianism. His publications include:

- Last Weapons: Hunger Strikes and Fasts in the British Empire, 1890–1948 (University of California Press, 2019).
- The Congo Free State and the New Imperialism (Bedford/St. Martin's, 2016).
- (Co-edited with Philippa Levine and Frank Trentmann) Beyond Sovereignty: Britain, Empire, and Transnationalism, 1880–1950 (Palgrave Macmillan, 2007).
- A Civilised Savagery: Britain and the New Slaveries in Africa, 1884–1926 (Routledge, 2005).
