= Steven Tepper =

American sociologist (born 1967)

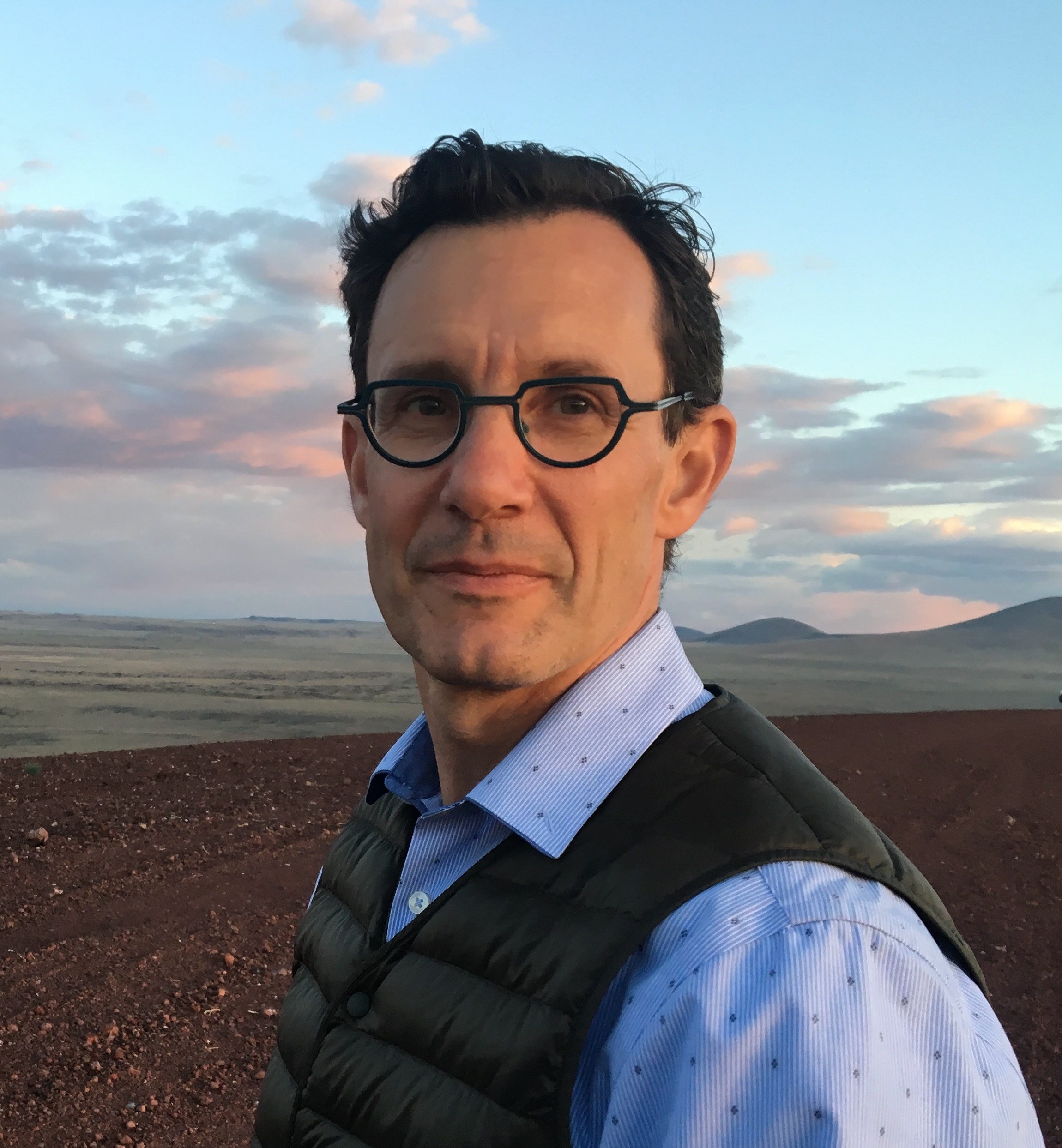
- Tepper in 2019

21st President of Hamilton College
- Incumbent
- Assumed office July 1, 2024
- Preceded by: David Wippman

Personal details
- Born: July 16, 1967 (age 59) Silver Spring, Maryland, U.S.
- Spouse: Dana Mossman (m. 1994)
- Education: University of North Carolina, Chapel Hill (BA); Harvard University (MPP); Princeton University (PhD)

Steven J. Tepper (born July 16, 1967) is an American sociologist who has been the president of Hamilton College since July 1, 2024. Tepper was previously the deputy director of the Princeton University Center for Arts and Cultural Policy Studies, associate director of the Curb Center for Art, Enterprise and Public Policy at Vanderbilt University, and dean and director of the Herberger Institute for Design and the Arts at Arizona State University.

== Education ==
Tepper holds a bachelor's degree from the University of North Carolina at Chapel Hill (1989), where he served as senior class president. He also holds a masters in public policy from Harvard University’s Kennedy School of Government (1996) and a PhD in sociology from Princeton University (2001).

== Career ==
After Tepper graduated from the University of North Carolina at Chapel Hill, Chancellor Paul Hardin appointed him in 1990 to serve as the executive director of the University’s Bicentennial Observance (1993-1994); an 8-month celebration of the nation’s first public university to open its doors. The Observance featured more than 120 events across the state of North Carolina, including a kick off event at UNC’s Kenan Stadium featuring a keynote address by President Bill Clinton (October 12, 1993).

While pursuing his PhD at Princeton University, Steven Tepper helped launch the Center for Arts and Cultural Policy Studies, serving as associate and then deputy director from 1998 to 2004. and working directly with Center faculty directors Paul DiMaggio and Stan Katz. The Princeton University Center was one of the first cultural policy centers at a US university and the first embedded in a policy school.

In 2004, Tepper joined former National Endowment for the Arts Chairman Bill Ivey at Vanderbilt University to launch another national policy center focused on arts and culture – The Curb Center for Art, Enterprise and Public Policy. While at Vanderbilt University, Tepper served as associate director of the Curb Center, assistant and associate professor of sociology, and co-chair, with Mel Zeigler, of the Vanderbilt Creative Campus Taskforce. He also served as lead facilitator for Leadership Music in Nashville, TN from 2012-2014, a leadership and professional development program for music executives and artists. Tepper launched the Strategic National Alumni Project (SNAAP) with initial support from the Surdna Foundation, serving as SNAAP’s first research director from 2006 to 2018. SNAAP is the largest survey ever conducted of arts and design graduates, with more than 200,000 survey respondents to date. Tepper's work on creative graduates has challenged the "starving artist" myth and has been covered widely.

In 2014, Tepper joined Arizona State University as Dean and Director of the Herberger Institute for Design and the Arts, the nation's largest comprehensive design and arts college at a research university. Tepper created a new film school in 2019 and secured permission from legendary actor Sidney Poitier and his family in 2021 to name the school the Sidney Poitier New American Film School. Under Tepper's leadership, the Institute has expanded from Tempe, AZ into 3 additional cities with state-of-the-art facilities in downtown Phoenix (Fusion on First), downtown Mesa (MIX Center), and downtown LA (ASU California Center). The Media and Immersive Experience Center (MIX) opened in August 2022. In the summer of 2023, Tepper led the integration of the historic Fashion Institute for Design and Merchandising in downtown L.A. into ASU as the 6th school in the Herberger Institute, now named ASU FIDM.

In 2024, Tepper was named the 21st president of Hamilton College in Clinton, New York. The Hamilton College Board of Trustees unanimously elected Tepper in January 2024, following a nationwide search that included input from faculty, students, and alumni. He succeeded David Wippman who retired after eight years as president. His term began on July 1, 2024.

== Academic Work ==
Tepper’s research focuses on creativity, higher education, creative work and careers, cultural policy and cultural conflict. He has written and spoken extensively about creativity in higher education and has been featured in the Chronicle of Higher Education, Inside Higher Education, Fast Company, and the Huffington Post. In 2011, he was interviewed by Jeffrey Brown on PBS NewHour to discuss his research on cultural conflict.

He is author of two books:

- Not Here, Not Now, Not That: Protest over Art and Culture in American Cities (2011, University of Chicago Press), ISBN 9780226792873
- Engaging Art, The Next Great Transformation of America’s Cultural Life. Co-edited with William Ivey (2007, Routledge). ISBN 9780415960427

== Honors and recognition ==
Tepper was appointed to the American Academy for Arts and Sciences’ National Commission on the Arts (2019-2021) and served on the board of the National Humanities Alliance (2021–2023). He was named Leader of the Year in Public Policy in 2016 by the Arizona Capitol Times. He was awarded the 2019 Full Circle Award for making transformational change for youth.
