= M. Woolsey Stryker =

American clergyman (1851–1929)

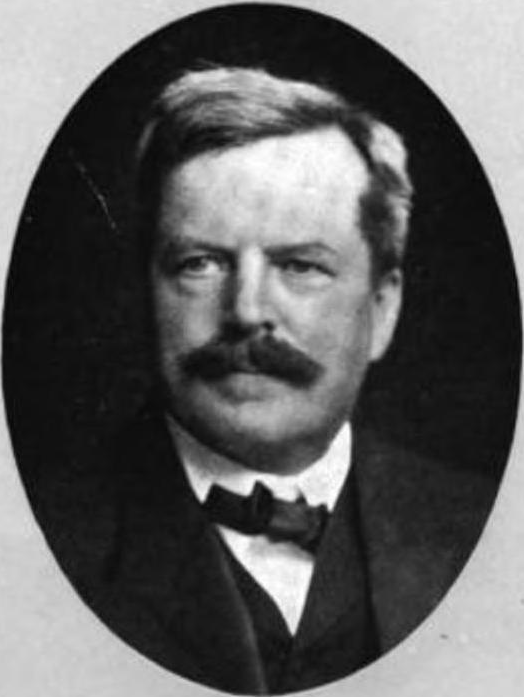
- Stryker in a 1910 publication

9th President of Hamilton College
- In office 1892–1917
- Preceded by: Henry Darling
- Succeeded by: Frederick Carlos Ferry

Personal details
- Born: Melancthon Woolsey Stryker; January 7, 1851 Vernon, New York, U.S.
- Died: December 6, 1929 (aged 78) Clinton, New York, U.S.
- Resting place: Hamilton College Cemetery
- Spouse: Clara Elizabeth Goss (m. 1876)
- Relations: Melancthon Taylor Woolsey (grandfather)
- Children: 6, including Lloyd
- Education: Hamilton College (AB, DD); Auburn Theological Seminary

Melancthon Woolsey Stryker (January 7, 1851 – December 6, 1929), an American clergyman, was pastor of the Fourth Presbyterian Church in Chicago and president of Hamilton College in upstate New York from 1892 to 1917. He distanced Hamilton from the Presbyterian Church, moving it towards becoming a more secular institution.

== Early life ==
M. Woolsey Stryker was born on January 7, 1851, in Vernon, Oneida County, New York, to Isaac Pierson Stryker (1815–1899), a Presbyterian minister, and Alida Livingston Woolsey (1822–1859). His maternal grandfather was Melancthon Taylor Woolsey. Educated at the Rome Academy and Hamilton College, from which he graduated in 1872 with a A.B. and later received a D.D. in 1888. Stryker also attended Auburn Theological Seminary, graduating in 1876. He received LL.D. honorary degrees from Lafayette College in 1889 and Wesleyan College in 1909.

== Career ==
Stryker's first position was in Auburn, New York. In 1878 he took another position in Ithaca, and in 1883 he accepted a position in Holyoke, Massachusetts. In 1885 Stryker became pastor of the Fourth Presbyterian Church in Chicago.

He left that position to become the ninth president of his alma mater, Hamilton College in 1893, and served there until 1917. Styker was a popular speaker, and widely quoted in his day. As Hamilton's president, Stryker strongly defended the traditional approach to a liberal arts education, and preserved the teaching of the classics. He also became known for his individualism and disdain for mob choices, although he vehemently disapproved of President Theodore Roosevelt, whom he greatly resembled.

A liberal, Stryker spoke out against prejudice against Jews, basing "his argument on the fact that our spiritual and religious perceptions have been first taught by Jews, and that the Old as well as the New Testament we owe entirely to men of that race. " He was one of the signers of the Blackstone Memorial advocating the creation of a Jewish State as a solution to anti-Jewish pogroms in Russia.

Stryker also compiled and wrote poetry and hymns. With Hubert Platt Main, he jointly edited The Church Praise Book (1882) and contributed 9 original pieces, and the New Alleluia (1880–86). Stryker also edited Christian Chorals, for the Chapel and Fireside (1885), and Church Song (1889; including 19 original contributions). He also published Hymns and Verses (1883), and Song of Miriam, and Other Hymns and Verses (1888) and College Hymnal (1897, including 27 of his works published 1890–1894). His verse Latermath was published in 1896. He also wrote An Outline Study of the History of the Bible in English: With a Brief Essay on its Quality as Literature. After his retirement, Stryker continued as a trustee of Hamilton College as well as Auburn Theological Seminary.

== Personal life ==
On September 27, 1876, Stryker married Clara Elizabeth Goss (1856–1936), a daughter of Simon S. Goss of Auburn, New York. The couple's children included:

- Goss Livingston Stryker (1877–1971), who married Harriet Mary Daniels, a daughter of George Henry Daniels, in 1911.
- Alida Livingston Stryker (1881–1951), who married Elihu Root Jr., son of Hamilton alum and trustee Elihu Root, the U.S. Secretary of State and War, in 1907; his sister Edith Root married Ulysses S. Grant III.
- Robert McBurney Stryker (1883–1883), who died in infancy.
- Lloyd Paul Stryker (1885–1955), who married Katharine Hawley, a daughter of Chauncey S. Truax, in 1910.
- Evelyn Stryker (1888–1976), who married Winthrop Tarbell Scarritt.
- Elizabeth Woolsey Stryker (b. 1896), who married George U. Stevens in 1923.

Stryker died in Clinton in 1929, and was buried in the Hamilton College cemetery.
