= Richard Scott Conley =

American dental academic

Richard Scott Conley is an American dental academic.

Conley graduated from Hamilton College with a bachelor's degree in chemistry and obtained a doctorate in dental medicine from the University of Pennsylvania. Prior to joining the faculty of the University at Buffalo as L. B. Badgero Endowed Associate Professor in 2016, he taught for a time as Robert W. Browne Endowed Professor of Dentistry at the University of Michigan.
