= Mary P. Hiatt =

American English professor (1920–2005)

- Born: Mary Pott; November 16, 1920; Wusih, China
- Died: November 13, 2005 (aged 84)

Mary Pott Hiatt (1920–2005) was a professor and chair of the English Department at Baruch College, City University of New York. She was known for her working using computers to analyze the writing styles of both male and female novelists.

== Early life and education ==
Hiatt was born in Wuish, China and then went on to graduate from the Shanghai American School in 1936. She graduated from Elmira College in 1941. She earned her doctorate in 1971 from Columbia University, and then moved to Baruch College in 1965.

== Research ==
Hiatt's research examined writing styles and she published on the interrelationship of style and gender, addressing prevalent stereotypes about 19th and 20th century female novelists. Her computer-analysis of 19th century novelists compared 80 000 words randomly taken from works of both female and male novelists and found no significant differences in style, hence forming an important part of feminist scholarship.

== Selected publications ==
- Artful Balance: The Parallel Structures of Style (1975)
- The Way Women Write: Sex and Style in Contemporary Prose (1977)
- Hiatt, Mary P. (1978). "The Feminine Style: Theory and Fact". College Composition and Communication. 29 (3): 222–226. doi:10.2307/356931. ISSN 0010-096X.
- Style and the Scribbling Women: An Empirical Analysis of Nineteenth-Century American Fiction (1993)

== Honors and awards ==
In 1979 she received the Richard Braddock Award from the journal College Composition and Communication.
