= Harry Kondoleon =

American dramatist

Harry Kondoleon was a gay American playwright and novelist. He was born on February 26, 1955. He died of AIDS' companion infections in New York City on March 16, 1994, aged 39.

He graduated from Hamilton College and the Yale School of Drama. He was awarded the Fulbright, National Endowment for the Arts, Rockefeller and Guggenheim fellowships.

== Works ==
=== Plays ===
- The Brides - 1980
- The Côte d'Azur Triangle - 1980
- Rococo - 1981
- Self-Torture and Strenuous Exercise - 1982
- Andrea Rescued - 1982
- Clara Toil - 1982
- The Fairy Garden - 1982
- Christmas on Mars - 1983
- Slacks and Tops - 1983
- Linda Her - 1984
- The Vampires - 1984
- Anteroom - 1985
- Play Yourself - 1988
- The Poet's Corner - 1988
- Zero Positive - 1988
- Love Diatribe - 1990
- The Houseguests - 1993
- Saved or Destroyed - 1994

=== Novels ===
- The Whore of Tiampuan - 1991
- Diary of a Lost Boy - 1994

=== Poetry ===
- Rudy on Ruby and Nadine (Wedge pamphlet)
- The Death of Understanding: Love Poems - 1987

== Awards ==
- 1982-1983 Obie Award for "most promising young playwright" (Shared with Tina Howe (for "distinguished playwriting"), and David Mamet (for Edmond))
- 1984-1985 Obie Award to Elizabeth Wilson for her role in Kondoleon's "Anteroom"
- 1992-1993 Obie Award for "The Houseguests"
- 2000-2001 Obie Award to Craig Lucas for directing "Saved or Destroyed"
