= Katharine Kuharic =

American painter (born 1962)

- Born: 1962 (age 63–64); South Bend, Indiana, United States
- Education: Carnegie Mellon University, School of Visual Arts
- Known for: Painting, drawing
- Style: Figurative
- Awards: Rockefeller Foundation, New York Foundation for the Arts, Art Matters
- Website: Katharine Kuharic

Katharine Kuharic, Super Bowl Sunday, oil on linen, 36" x 24", 2003; St. Louis Art Museum collection.

Katharine Kuharic is an American artist known for multi-layered representational paintings that combine allegory, humor, social critique, and aspects of Pop and pastoral art. Her art typically employs painstaking brushwork, high-keyed, almost hallucinogenic color, discontinuities of scale, and compositions packed with a profusion of hyper-real detail, figures and associations. She has investigated themes including queer sexual and political identity, American excess and suburban culture, social mores, the body and death. Artist-critic David Humphrey called Kuharic "a visionary misuser" who reconfigures disparate elements into a "Queer Populist Hallucinatory Realism" of socially charged image-sentences that shake out ideologies from "the congealed facts of contemporary culture" and celebrate the possibility of an alternative order.

Kuharic has been recognized with awards from the Rockefeller Foundation, Contemporary Art Museum St. Louis, New York Foundation for the Arts, and San Francisco Art Institute, among others. She has shown internationally, and her work belongs to the public collections of the St. Louis Art Museum and Pennsylvania Academy of the Fine Arts. She lives in New York and is a professor of art at Hamilton College.

== Education and career ==
Kuharic was born in South Bend, Indiana in 1962. She completed a BFA in painting and drawing at Carnegie Mellon University in 1984 and then moved to New York City, where she studied at the School of Visual Arts with Louise Bourgeois and Robert Storr. In the decade that followed, she exhibited at New York venues including Hallwalls, White Columns, Drawing Center, Four Walls, and P.P.O.W., where she had a solo show in 1994. She has continued to show at P.P.O.W., with six subsequent solo exhibitions between 1997 and 2016.

In the early 2000s, Kuharic returned to the Midwest, relocating to St. Louis for a teaching position at the Sam Fox School of Design & Visual Arts at Washington University in St. Louis. Since then, she has had solo exhibitions at the Contemporary Art Museum St. Louis, The Delaware Contemporary, and South Bend Museum of Art, and appeared in group shows at the Pennsylvania Academy of the Fine Arts, Contemporary Arts Museum Houston, and Portsmouth Museum of Fine Art, among others.

Kuharic has taught art since the mid-1990s, at institutions including Yale School of Art, The New School, the School of Visual Arts, and Washington University (2002–6), where she served as a lecturer, associate professor and coordinator of painting. She has been a professor at Hamilton College in Clinton, New York since 2007.

== Work ==
Kuharic's paintings been described variously as surreal, magic realist, and "hyperbolic realist." She employs complex, labor-intensive techniques; these include the collaging, drawing, re-collaging and re-drawing of appropriated imagery (before hand-transferring compositions onto canvas) and an old-master-like painting process in which she renders images tonally before applying discrete layers of color. Writer Terry R. Myers suggested that Kuharic shares with painter Lari Pittman an interest in the power of popular culture and its complex relationship to queer sexual and political identity. Her tableaux of juxtaposed, loaded imagery yield proliferating strings of ideas, jokes and interpretations—often in a picture-puzzle or rebus-like manner—that viewers must complete; writer Keith Recker wrote that Kuharic's webs of images and paint handling engender a "frightening, essential tug of war" teetering "between happiness and despair, love and death, safety and risk."

Katharine Kuharic, Mister Rogers, oil on linen, 40" x 60", 1996.

=== Earlier painting (1986–99) ===
Kuharic's early work explored the body and sexual desire, social mores and grief through imagery of animals, anatomy and nature, death heads and female figures. Reviews described this work as built-up layers of visual information "rendered with a kind of Pre-Raphaelite hyper-clarity," which pushed the limits of perception to create a kind of "a hallucinatory, multicolored static." Her early paintings often depicted predatory domestic animals—cats and dogs, frequently bulldogs—as in Food Chain (1989) or Long Wait (1990), in which a staring cat hunched over a bird's nest full of eggs. New York Times critic Holland Cotter characterized them as strange, small works "painted in tight colored lines that look like a kind of jittery embroidery," suggesting a "cross between children's-book illustrations and bad-trip psychedelia."

In the 1990s, Kuharic turned to more personal, sometimes macabre, imagery of the body, symbolic objects and female figures occasionally configured in timelines representing sexual partners. In a 1992 Los Angeles Times review, critic Susan Kandel described one such set of watercolors as a Utopian, "jewel-like vision of a world of women, free not just of men, but of the gaze of men" and charged with energy and empowerment. Later, minutely detailed works depicted women with flayed or heavily tattooed flesh, featured in fraught scenarios or guises and placed alongside iconic figures of femininity (e.g., Priestess, 1996; Backwards Flags, 1998). The surreal work, Mister Rogers (1996), was dominated by a central young woman covered with tattoos, who is encircled by a second figure rendered in cutaways of tissue, bones and entrails and surrounded by small female figures: a debutante, a dominatrix, nuns and Eastern religious devotees, and a trapeze artist among them; another painting depicted a bare-breasted woman decked in pearls with red and blue worms teeming from the sockets of her skull.

Time Out critic Bill Arning described the paintings in Kuharic's exhibition, "Show Quality Bitches" (P.P.O.W., 1997), as "bizarre, theatrical tableaux" and "lesbian theme parks" with the heightened quality of opera, which juxtaposed sometimes-frightening female figures and caricatures of social constructions of the feminine against luscious monochromatic backgrounds. Mind's Eye depicted a disembodied eye set against a blood-red background that looms over barely postpubescent girl in a cowgirl hat; she was surrounded by a fashion model, a Bettie Page-type dominatrix, a jester, and a doll of an infant among others.

=== Later painting (2000– ) ===
Katharine Kuharic, Pound of Flesh, oil on linen, 6' x 4', 2011.

In the 2000s, Kuharic shifted toward more socio-politically focused work using found (or what she termed "unsolicited") imagery appropriated from local newspapers and magazines, slick-printed flyers, and junk mail. She reconfigured the imagery into packed paintings examining American overabundance, consumerism, and boom-and-bust real estate and financial markets, taking a tone that was simultaneously critical, celebratory and surreal. For example, Super Bowl Sunday (2003) consisted of seven mandala- or flower-forms composed of sparkling, fanned-out products (Gatorade and beer bottles, shoes, cans of produce, meat) that hovered like spacecraft in a blue sky over a devastated, rubble-strewn landscape depicting a bombed out, tiled bathroom and tangle of twisted pipes. It drew on Kuharic's memories of the chaos of leaving her downtown New York studio following 9/11 and relocating to St. Louis. Village Voice critic Kim Levin described that work and others in Kuharic's show "Throb" (P.P.O.W., 2004) as "zonked heartland imagery of burgers, fries, flags, Super Bowl stuff, and corn as high as an elephant’s eye" relating to "our country’s current bad trip."

Kuharic targeted middle-class suburban culture, McMansions and Midwestern stereotypes in subsequent exhibitions at the Contemporary Art Museum St. Louis ("The World Brought Low", 2005) and Bruno David Gallery ("Working in the Lou," 2012). The former show included Jack's Originals (2004), a restaging of the expulsion from the Garden of Eden that portrays a casually dressed, middle-aged group atop jerry-built scaffolding made of potato chip bags, cheeseburgers, plates of club sandwiches, hams and other goods; a giant sun composed of a central frozen pizza package and plastic detergent bottles hovers above them. Critic Jessica Baran described works in the latter show, such as Ladue News (2010), as "big-box surrealist nightmares-as-paintings." That painting depicted affluent groupings (culled from society magazines) ascending towards an expanding, sphincter-like mandala of product containers that seems to threaten the ramshackle building in which they are placed.

In the 2010s, Kuharic returned to more personal concerns involving appearance, ambition, comfort, love, middle age and death. Her show "Pound of Flesh" (P.P.O.W., 2012) combined earlier themes of consumer excess with symbols and motifs representing weight loss and gain, nourishment, fertility, and self-reproach. The show's title work juxtaposed motifs of eggs, hollyhocks, songbirds and Weight Watchers frozen dinner packages, text repeated and configured into a sunrise or sunset, and graphic elements charting Kuharic's annual weight. In the show, "A Masque of Mercy" (Philip Slein, 2015), she presented intricate, allegorical paintings populated by psychedelic skeletons, bulldogs, cats, birds and flora that evoked both grief and the consolations of nature (e.g., The Nipple I Never Knew, 2015). During this period, she also produced the monumental, long-term project, "What Women Lost", which began with Hillary Clinton’s first failed presidential bid; its title references Betty Friedan’s assertion that while men accumulate power and money, women are busy losing weight in order to appear more attractive. The project involved a large-scale painting, forty-five individual portraits of the U.S. presidents, live performance painting, and video.

== Awards and public collections ==
Kuharic has been recognized with a Rockefeller Fellowship (2005, Bellagio, Italy residency), a FIAR International Prize (1991), and awards and grants from the Contemporary Museum St. Louis (2005), Milton and Sally Avery Arts Foundation (2003–4), Kranzberg Arts Foundation (2004), New York Foundation for the Arts (2002), Penny McCall Foundation (1999), and Art Matters (1990), among others. In 2018, she was named the San Francisco Art Institute’s Richard Diebenkorn Teaching Fellow for that year. She has also received artist residencies from MacDowell (2003–4), Gyeonggi Creation Center (2015, South Korea), and the Headlands Center for the Arts (2018). Her work belongs to the public collections of the St. Louis Art Museum and Pennsylvania Academy of the Fine Arts.
