= Frank Anechiarico =

Frank Anechiarico is Maynard-Knox Professor of Government and Law at Hamilton College.

== Books ==
- The pursuit of absolute integrity : how corruption control makes government ineffective (University of Chicago Press, 1996)
