= Joan Hinde Stewart =

American academic administrator (born 1944)

19th President of Hamilton College
- In office July 1, 2003 – July 1, 2016
- Preceded by: Eugene Tobin
- Succeeded by: David Wippman

Personal details
- Born: Joan Hinde; 1944 (age 81–82) Brooklyn, New York, U.S.
- Spouse: Philip Stewart
- Children: 2
- Education: St. Joseph's College (BA); Yale University (PhD)

Joan Hinde Stewart (born 1944) is an American academic administrator who served as the 19th president of Hamilton College in Clinton, New York from 2003 to 2016. She was the first woman to hold the office at Hamilton and remains the only woman ever to serve in the office.

== Early life and education ==
Stewart was born and raised in Brooklyn, New York. After earning a Bachelor of Arts degree, summa cum laude, from St. Joseph's College in 1965, Stewart earned a Ph.D. in French from Yale University in 1970.

== Career ==
Stewart taught French and was Dean of the college of Liberal Arts at the University of South Carolina from 1999 to 2003, before assuming the presidency of Hamilton College. Before the University of South Carolina, Stewart taught French at North Carolina State University from 1973 to 1999 and served as Chair of the Department of Foreign Languages from 1985 to 1997. Since 2015, Stewart has served as a trustee of the National Humanities Center in Research Triangle Park. Stewart has served as a member of the president's council of the University of the People.

Stewart retired as president of Hamilton College in 2016, and was succeeded by legal scholar, David Wippman.

== Personal life ==
Stewart is married to Philip Stewart, who retired in 2008 from Duke University, where he was the Benjamin E. Powell Professor of Romance Studies. The couple has two grown children.
