= Jay Reise =

American composer (born 1950)

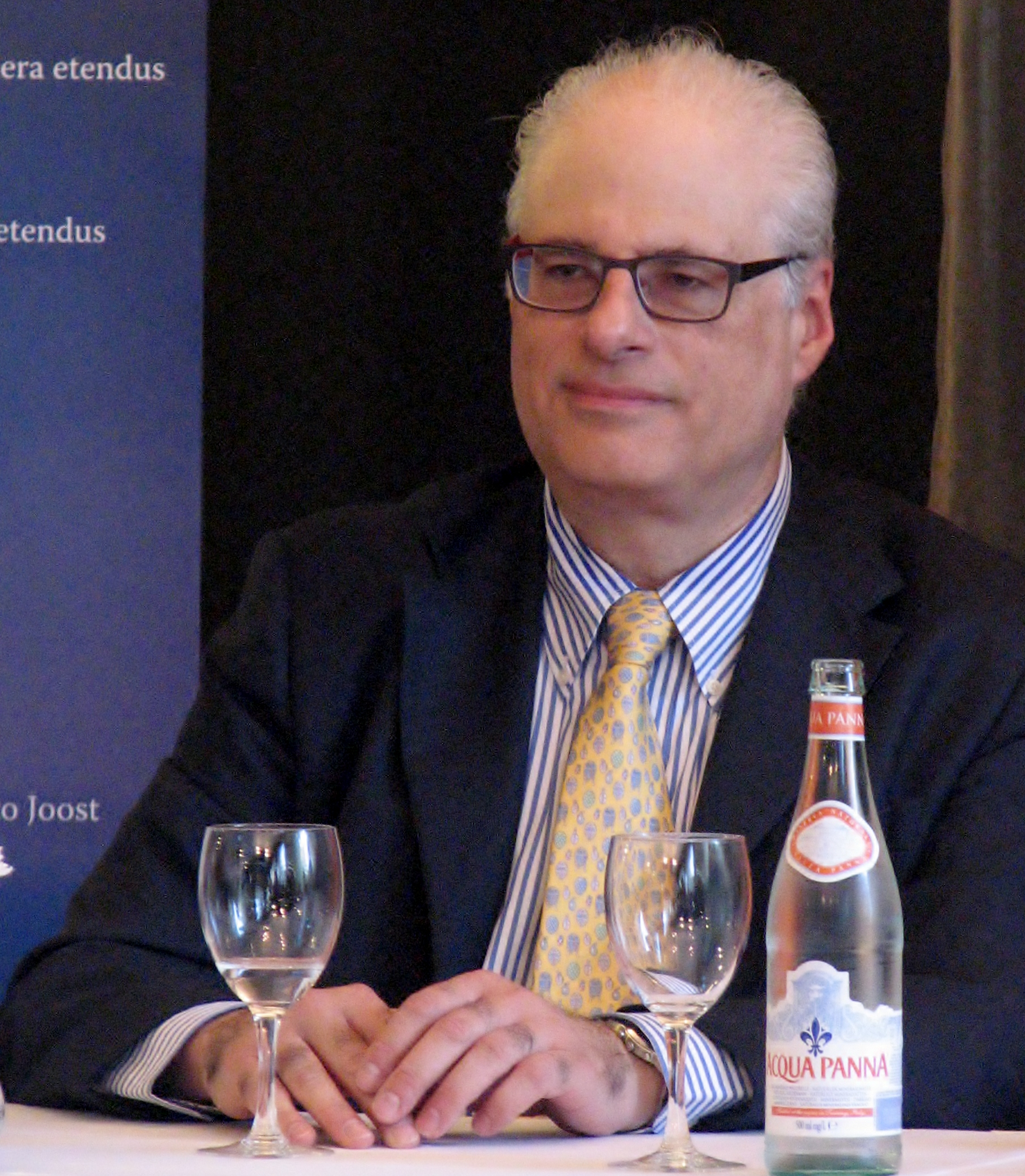
- Reise in 2012
- Born: February 9, 1950 (age 76); New York City, U.S.
- Education: Hamilton College; McGill University; University of Pennsylvania
- Occupations: Composer, university professor
- Notable work: Rasputin
- Spouse: Cecilia Paredes

Jay Reise (born February 9, 1950) is an American composer and teacher. He is known for the opera Rasputin, premiered by the New York City Opera and later performed in the United States, Moscow, and Paris. He is Professor Emeritus of Music at the University of Pennsylvania.

== Biography ==
Reise spent his childhood surrounded by classical music and jazz, but began his composition studies with Jimmy Giuffre and Hugh Hartwell in 1970. After graduating at Hamilton College in 1972, he pursued composition study at McGill University (with Bengt Hambraeus and Bruce Mather), the University of Pennsylvania (AM, 1975; George Crumb and Richard Wernick), Tanglewood, and Carnatic rhythm with Adrian L'Armand.

He is currently Professor Emeritus of Music at the University of Pennsylvania.

Reise is married to visual artist Cecilia Paredes and has two sons, Matthew Reise (born 1981) and Nicholas Reise (born 1983) from his first marriage to Esther Barazzone.

== Music ==
Reise's music draws on polyphonic classical traditions. After being influenced by the great western classical voice-leading tradition, he became interested in Carnatic rhythm and integrated its techniques into his style. This has resulted in a method he calls "rhythmic polyphony" in which rhythmic motives are developed within the phrase such that the cadence point of the phrase is implied by the rhythms alone.

Works written before the adoption of the rhythmic method include Symphony of Voices (1978) which was premiered at the Monadnock Festival with soprano Neva Pilgrim, and his Second Symphony (1980) premiered by the Syracuse Symphony, conducted by Christopher Keene, and performed subsequently by the Philadelphia Orchestra. His Third Symphony was premiered by Keene and the Long Island Philharmonic in 1983. His 2-act opera Rasputin with a libretto by the composer, was commissioned by Beverly Sills and the New York City Opera, and was premiered by City Opera in 1988. Rasputin received its Russian premiere at the Helikon Opera in Moscow, directed by Dmitry Bertman, in September 2008.

Works after 1990 include The River Within (concerto for violin and orchestra, 2008) premiered by soloist Maria Bachmann and orchestra 2001, James Freeman conductor; Concerto for Horn and 7 Instruments (2006) with Adam Unsworth and the Network for New Music, Jan Krzywicki, conductor; Powers That Be (2005) for piano quintet with the Cassatt Quartet and Marc-André Hamelin; Memory Refrains (string quartet in one movement, 2002) with the Cassatt Quartet; the piano solo suite Six Pictures from 'The Devil in the Flesh' by Marc-André Hamelin; the Oscar Wilde-based ballet fairy-tale The Selfish Giant by the Philharmonia Orchestra with conductor Djong Victorin Yu in London in 1997; and two extended piano works, Sonata Rhythmikosmos (Mari Akagi) and Rhythmic Garlands (James Primosch). His left hand transcriptions of Scriabin's Études Op. 2, No. 1 and Op. 8, No. 12 have been performed by Gary Graffman and Matthew Bengtson.

Some works by Reise have been performed by Anastasia Vedyakova for the first time in Russia.

Reise's music is published by Merion Music/Theodore Presser. The Scriabin transcriptions are published in the Journal of the Scriabin Society of America.

== Selected works ==
=== Discography ===
- Jay Reise Chamber Music (Albany TROY) 2004
- The Devil in the Flesh and Other Pieces (Albany TROY665) 2004
- Rhythmic Garlands and Other Pieces (Centaur CRC 2598) 2003
- Concerto for Cello and 13 Instruments (CRI 899) 2002
- Chesapeake Rhythms CRI 760 (CD) (1997)
- Six Preludes for Piano CRS 3862 (LP) (1984)

Performers include Charles Abramovic, Jody Applebaum, Ulrich Boeckheller, Gregory Fulkerson, Marc-André Hamelin, Jerome Lowenthal, Charles Ullery. the Cassatt Quartet, Four Horizons, Network for New Music and Orchestra 2001 among others.

=== Compositions ===
[Publisher: Merion Music]

==== Stage ====
- Rasputin opera in two acts (1988); libretto by the composer

==== Orchestral ====
- The Selfish Giant choreographic tone-poem in six scenes based on the fairy-tale by Oscar Wilde (1997)
- Symphony No. 3 (1983)
- Symphony No. 2 (1980)
- Symphony of Voices (1978) for orchestra with soprano

==== Concerti ====
- The River Within (Concerto for Violin and Orchestra) 2008
- Concerto for Horn and 7 Instruments 2006
- Yellowstone Rhythms for bassoon and 10 players (2001)
- Concerto for Cello and 13 Instruments (2000)

==== Wind ensemble ====
- Tinicum Rhythms for concert band (1997)

==== Chamber music ====
2 players

- Jisei (Japanese Death Poems) for voice and shakuhachi (2003)
- Yellowstone Rhythms (version for bassoon and piano) (1996)
- Duo Rhythmikosmos for violin and piano (1994)
- Moonwatching for flute and violin (1994)
- La Choumine for viola and piano (1984)

3 players

- Trio Rhythmikosmos (violin, cello, piano), (1993)

4 players

- Across the Horizons for clarinet, violin, cello, and piano (2004)
- Memory Refrains (String Quartet in One Movement), (2002)

5 of more players

- Powers That Be for piano quintet (2005)
- Open Night, Poem-Caprice for Six Instruments (2003)
- Chesapeake Rhythms for eleven players (1995)
- Celebrations for brass quintet (1994)
- Sinfonietta for Wind Quintet (1985)
- Concerto-Fantasy for Nine Players (1975)

=== Instrumental music ===
- Dragonflies sing near for solo guitar (2000)

==== Piano ====
- Transcription for left hand of Scriabin's Etude, Op. 8, No. 12 (2005)
- Transcription for left hand of Scriabin's Etude, Op. 2, No. 1 (2003)
- Six Pictures from 'The Devil in the Flesh' (2001)
- Sonata Rhythmikosmos (1993)
- Rhythmic Garlands (1992)

Two pianos

- Three Pictures from 'The Devil in the Flesh' (2001)

=== Vocal music ===
- Arcadian Shadows (soprano, clarinet, cello, and piano) (5')
- Satori (version soprano, oboe, cello, piano), poem by Damian Congressi, (2005)
- Satori (version soprano and piano trio) (1995)
- Satori (version for soprano and piano) (1995)

=== Choral music ===
- Psalm 23 1980

== Writings ==
- "Context, Choice and Issues of Perceived Determinism in Music", in Indeterminacy: The Mapped, the Navigable, and the Uncharted, Jose V. Ciprut, Contributing Editor (MIT Press, 2008 forthcoming): 241–266
- "Lukas Foss: Ways of Looking at Music" in National Gallery of Art (2001): non paginated
- "The Phonograph Behind the Door: Some Thoughts on Musical Literacy," [with Peter J. Rabinowitz] in Reading World Literature: Theory, History, Practice, edited by Sarah Lawall (University of Texas Press, 1994): 287–308.
- "Doctrine of Despair: Zimmermann's Die Soldaten", Opera News (September): 1991
- "Late Skriabin: Some Principles Behind the Style," 19th-Century Music (Spring, 1983): 220–231, reprinted in The Journal of the Scriabin Society of America (Winter 1996–97): 29–46
- "Rochberg the Progressive", Perspectives of New Music (1980–81): 395–407

== Sources ==
- Freeman, James (2001). "Reise, Jay". In Sadie, Stanley; Tyrrell, John (eds.). The New Grove Dictionary of Music and Musicians (2nd ed.). London: Macmillan Publishers. ISBN 978-1-56159-239-5.
