= Semyon Bychkov (conductor) =

Soviet conductor and pianist (born 1952)

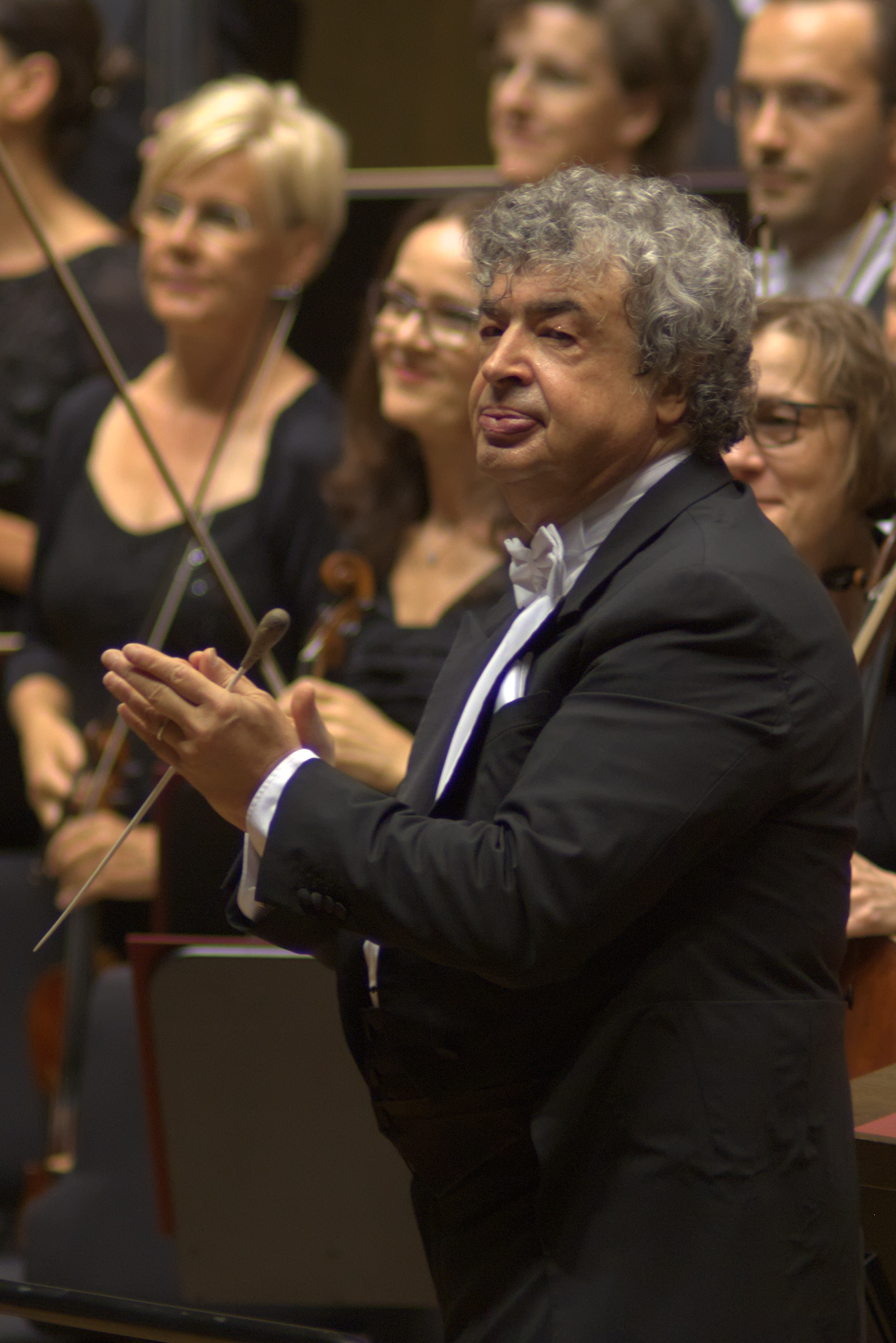
Semyon Bychkov during a performance

Semyon Mayevich Bychkov (Russian: Семён Маевич Бычков, IPA: [sʲɪˈmʲɵn ˈma(j)ɪvʲɪdʑ bɨtɕˈkof]; born November 30, 1952) is a Soviet-born American conductor. He is the chief conductor and artistic director of the Czech Philharmonic.

== Biography ==
=== Childhood and studies in Russia ===
Bychkov was born in Leningrad (now Saint Petersburg) to Jewish parents. His younger brother was Yakov Kreizberg, also a conductor. Bychkov studied at the Glinka Choir School for ten years before moving to the Leningrad Conservatory, where he was a student of Ilya Musin. At the Conservatory, Bychkov played volleyball for the Leningrad Dynamos. In 1973 he won the Rachmaninov Conducting Competition, but was denied the usual prize of conducting the Leningrad Philharmonic by the authorities after he applied for an exit visa. His family had suffered from official antisemitism, and after expressing views critical of the Soviet regime, in 1974 he decided to leave the country, going first to Vienna with only $100.

=== Studies and career in the United States ===
In 1975, at age 22, he left Vienna and emigrated to the United States. Bychkov graduated from the Mannes School of Music, then became the director of the Mannes College Orchestra. From 1980 to 1985, he served as music director of the Grand Rapids Symphony in Grand Rapids, Michigan, and through his Mannes connection with fellow alumnus Julius Rudel became principal guest conductor of the Buffalo Philharmonic Orchestra. Again through his connection with Rudel, Bychkov made his debut conducting Carmen at the New York City Opera on September 30, 1981 (the six performances were his only appearances with that company). On 4 July 1983, he became a U.S. citizen. In 1985, he became music director of the Buffalo Philharmonic, and he held that post until 1989. During his time in Grand Rapids and Buffalo, Bychkov came to international attention following a series of high-profile cancellations in 1984 and 1985 that resulted in invitations to conduct the New York Philharmonic, the Berlin Philharmonic, and the Royal Concertgebouw Orchestra. He was subsequently signed to a 10-year recording contract with Philips Classics Records, and made his debut recording conducting the Berlin Philharmonic in Shostakovich's Symphony No. 5.

=== Career in Europe ===
From 1989 to 1998, Bychkov was music director of the Orchestre de Paris. He became principal guest conductor of the Saint Petersburg Philharmonic Orchestra in 1990, principal guest conductor of the Maggio Musicale Fiorentino in 1992, chief conductor of Dresden's Semperoper in 1998 and chief conductor of the WDR Symphony Orchestra Cologne in 1997. He remained in Cologne until 2010, making a series of recordings including Brahms's Symphonies No. 1–4, Shostakovich's Symphonies Nos. 4, 7, 8, 10, and 11, Mahler's Symphony No. 3, Rachmaninov's The Bells and Symphonic Dances, Richard Strauss's Ein Heldenleben and Eine Alpensinfonie, Verdi's Requiem, as well as Strauss's Elektra and Daphne and Wagner's Lohengrin, which won BBC Music Magazine's Record of the Year for 2010.

Bychkov made his debut at the Royal Opera House, Covent Garden in 2003 with a new production of Elektra, and returned later that year to conduct Boris Godunov. In 2012, he assumed the newly created Günter Wand Conducting Chair with the BBC Symphony Orchestra, a post specially created for him. He holds the Otto Klemperer Chair of Conducting at the Royal Academy of Music in London.

In 2013, Bychkov first guest-conducted the Czech Philharmonic. In 2017, the Czech Philharmonic announced its appointment of Bychkov as its next chief conductor and music director, effective with the 2018–2019 season. In 2022, the Czech Philharmonic extended Bychkov's contract through 2028. In 2024, the Czech Philharmonic announced that Bychkov will stand down as its chief conductor and music director after the 2027–2028 season.

Bychkov was named 'Conductor of the Year' by the International Opera Awards in 2015. He became an honorary member of the Royal Academy of Music (Hon RAM) in 2015 and in 2022 received from the same institution an Honorary Doctorate of the University of London (Hon DMus). In 2018, Bychkov was invited to Bayreuth to conduct Parsifal, which he did for two years. He was called back to conduct Tristan und Isolde in 2024 and 2025.

In December 2025, Bychkov was the conductor at the Nobel Prize Concert 2025. In January 2026, the Paris Opera announced the appointment of Bychkov as its next music director, effective 1 August 2028, with an initial contract of four years. He is scheduled to take the title of music director-designate of the Opéra national de Paris on 1 August 2026.

=== Personal life ===
Bychkov has been married twice. His first marriage was to Tatiana Rozina; the couple had two children. Their marriage ended in divorce. Bychkov's second marriage is to the pianist Marielle Labèque. The couple reside on the Côte Basque in French Basque country.

== Selected discography ==
Album	Ensemble/Soloists	Label	Date
Richard Strauss - Elektra	Felicity Palmer, Deborah Polaski, Anne Schwanewilms, Graham Clark, Franz Grundheber, WDR Symphony Orchestra Cologne	Profil - Edition Günter Hänssler PH O5022	2005
Dmitri Shostakovich - Symphony No. 10, GLANERT - Theatrum bestiarum	WDR Symphony Orchestra Cologne	AVIE AV 2137	2007
Sergei Rachmaninoff - The Bells, Symphonic Dances	Tatiana Pavlovskaya, Evgeny Akimov, Vladimir Vaneev WDR Rundfunkchor Köln, Lege Artis Chamber Choir, WDR Symphony Orchestra Cologne	Profil - Edition Günter Hänssler PH 07028	2007
Giuseppe Verdi - Messa da Requiem	Violeta Urmana, Olga Borodina, Ramón Vargas, Ferruccio Furlanetto, WDR Rundfunkchor Köln, NDR Chor, Chor des Teatro Regio Turin, WDR Symphony Orchestra Cologne	Profil - Edition Günter Hänssler PH 08036	2008
Richard Wagner - Lohengrin	Johan Botha, Adrianne Pieczonka, Petra Lang, Kwangchul Youn, Falk Struckmann, Eike Wilm Schulte, WDR Symphony Orchestra Cologne, WDR Rundfunkchor Köln, NDR Chor, Prager Kammerchor, BBC MUSIC MAGAZINE 2010 DISC OF THE YEAR	Profil - Edition Günter Hänssler PH 09004	2009
Richard Strauss - Ein Alpensinfonie, Till Eulenspiegels lustige Streiche	WDR Symphony Orchestra Cologne	Profil - Edition Günter Hänssler PH 09065	2009
Pyotr Ilyich Tchaikovsky - Symphony No. 6 and Romeo & Juliet (Fantasy Overture) - Disc One	Czech Philharmonic	Decca Classics 4826331	2016
Pyotr Ilyich Tchaikovsky - Manfred Symphony - Disc Two	Czech Philharmonic	Decca Classics 4832320	2017
Tchaikovsky: The Tchaikovsky Project	Czech Philharmonic	Decca Classics 4834942	2019
Mahler: Symphony No. 4	Czech Philharmonic, Chen Reiss	Pentatone	2022
Mahler Symphony No. 5	Czech Philharmonic	Pentatone	2022
Mahler Symphony No. 2	Czech Philharmonic, Christiane Karg, Elisabeth Kulman, Prague Philharmonic Choir	Pentatone	2023
Mahler Symphony No. 1	Czech Philharmonic	Pentatone	2023
Smetana: Má Vlast	Czech Philharmonic	Pentatone	2024
Strauss: Oboe Concerto	Royal Concertbouw Orchestra	Klassiek	2024
Dvořák Symphonies Nos. 7, 8, 9	Czech Philharmonic	Pentatone	2024
Mahler: Symphony No. 3	Czech Philharmonic	Pentatone	2025
Gustav Mahler: Symphonies 1–9	Czech Philharmonic	Pentatone	2026

Cultural offices
Preceded by Theo Alcántara	Music Director, Grand Rapids Symphony; 1980–1985	Succeeded by Catherine Comet
Preceded by Julius Rudel	Music Director, Buffalo Philharmonic Orchestra; 1985–1989	Succeeded by Maximiano Valdés
Preceded by Hans Vonk	Principal Conductor, WDR Symphony Orchestra Cologne; 1997–2010	Succeeded by Jukka-Pekka Saraste
Preceded by Jiří Bělohlávek	Music Director, Czech Philharmonic; 2018–present	Succeeded by incumbent
