= Dylana Jenson =

American violinist (born 1961)

Dylana Jenson (born May 14, 1961) is an American concert violinist and violin teacher. She lives in Grand Rapids, Michigan with her husband, conductor and cellist David Lockington. They have four children. Jenson is the sister of Vicky Jenson, an animated film storyboard artist and director.

== Early career ==
Dylana Jenson was born in Los Angeles, California, and was a child prodigy. She began studying violin with her mother when she was two years and ten months old. She then studied with Manuel Compinsky, Nathan Milstein, and Josef Gingold. She made her debut at age eight, playing the Mendelssohn Violin Concerto. At age nine, she appeared on a Jack Benny television special, re-enacting Benny's famous duet with Gisele MacKensie. At age eleven, she performed the Tchaikovsky Violin Concerto with the Cincinnati Symphony Orchestra with Thomas Schippers conducting. On January 17, 1973, Jenson played Wieniawski's Polonaise de Concert, Op. 4 on The Tonight Show Starring Johnny Carson. By age thirteen, she had performed with many of the leading orchestras in the U.S., including the New York Philharmonic in Avery Fisher Hall (now David Geffen Hall), and the Los Angeles Philharmonic. She toured Europe, Latin America, and the Soviet Union. In 1978, at age seventeen, she won the silver medal at the International Tchaikovsky Competition.

== Later career ==
Jenson made her Carnegie Hall concert debut on December 9, 1980, playing the Sibelius Violin Concerto with the Philadelphia Orchestra under the direction of Eugene Ormandy. The performance was received with great acclaim. In 1981, she recorded the Sibelius Violin Concerto and Saint-Saëns's Introduction and Rondo Capriccioso with Eugene Ormandy and the Philadelphia Orchestra for RCA Red Seal. Music critic Edward Downes characterized her work as "unsurpassed since Heifetz."

Jenson had a long-term loan from a violin collector of a 1743 Guarneri violin, the instrument with which she made the Sibelius recording. When she announced to her benefactor that she was to marry, she was given a short time in which to return the instrument because he told her if she was to marry she was not serious about a career as a concert performer. After she performed the Brahms Violin Concerto with the San Francisco Symphony, the search for a new violin led to a decade-long hiatus. Yo-Yo Ma referred her to Samuel Zygmuntowicz, a contemporary luthier in Brooklyn who made sound-alike copies of antique Stradivarius and Guarneri violins for violinists such as Isaac Stern and Joshua Bell. In 1995, Jenson commissioned a violin from Zygmuntowicz based on a Guarneri model. This was the instrument used in her recorded Carnegie Hall concert and her Shostakovich/Barber CD recording.

In 2000, she was named distinguished professor of music at Grand Valley State University in Grand Rapids, Michigan. As of 2014, she is no longer a faculty member. In 2020–2021, she was a visiting associate professor of violin at the University of Notre Dame.

Jenson often performs with the Grand Rapids Symphony under the direction of her husband, David Lockington. These performances included a 2005 return to Carnegie Hall. Harris Goldsmith of the New York Concert Review said of this performance: "Her excellent performance brought to mind, and was a loving tribute to, the great Nathan Milstein... who was one of Jenson's mentors." The Strad said of the same performance: "In Jenson's hands, lyrical passages had an intense, tremulous quality...a sizzling performance.”

Jenson has also appeared with the Baltimore Symphony Orchestra, the Santa Barbara Symphony Orchestra, Indian Hill Orchestra (Littleton, Massachusetts), the Louisiana Philharmonic Orchestra, the New Mexico Symphony Orchestra, and at the Berkshire Festival and the Eastern Music Festival. She has toured of Australia and Japan and was made an honorary citizen of Costa Rica at the age of 12 for her contributions in music. Jenson plays recitals as well as concerts.

== Discography ==
In 1978, her live performance of the Sibelius Violin Concerto was released on the Melodiya label. Jenson's 1981 recording of the Sibelius Violin Concerto with Eugene Ormandy and the Philadelphia Orchestra was among the first of RCA Red Seal's major classical music productions recorded in digital audio. This recording received a Grammy Awards nomination in 1982. The album was later reissued on the RCA Victrola label and was reissued on a customer order basis by ArkivMusic as part of its historical reissue series. In 1982, Jenson recorded Brahms Violin Sonatas Nos. 1 & 3 with pianist Samuel Sanders for RCA Red Seal. Her 2005 Carnegie Hall performance was recorded in its entirety and published by the Grand Rapids Symphony; it includes Jenson performing Goldmark Violin Concerto No. 1. In 2008 Jenson recorded Shostakovich Violin Concerto No. 1 and the Barber Violin Concerto with the London Symphony Orchestra, played on the Zygmuntowicz violin.
