= David Lockington =

British American symphony conductor

- Born: David Kirkman Lockington; October 11, 1956 (age 69); Dartford, Kent, UK
- Occupations: Conductor, cellist
- Years active: 1999-present
- Spouse: Dylana Jenson

David Lockington (born October 11, 1956), is the music director laureate of the Grand Rapids Symphony located in Grand Rapids, Michigan, U.S. Lockington became the 13th music director of the Grand Rapids Symphony in January 1999 and stepped down from the post in May 2015 at the end of his 16th season with the orchestra. Prior to his tenure in Grand Rapids, Lockington served as the music director for the New Mexico Symphony Orchestra (1996–2000) and the Long Island Philharmonic (1995–2000). In May 2007, Lockington was named music director of the Modesto Symphony Orchestra in Modesto, California. From March 2013 to August 2021, Lockington was the music director of the Pasadena Symphony in Pasadena, California.

== Biography ==
=== Early life ===
Lockington was born as David Kirkman Lockington on October 11, 1956, in Dartford, Kent, UK. His father was a podiatrist and an amateur cellist. Lockington followed his father's interest in the cello and started taking cello lessons when he "was just about 10." He completed his education in Great Britain at the University of Cambridge, where he completed his Bachelor of Arts degree as a choral scholar.

=== Career in Great Britain ===
As a boy, Lockington sang in the English National Opera in productions such as the Magic Flute. David was principal cellist of the National Youth Orchestra of Great Britain. At sixteen, he began his career as a cellist and was the Principal Cellist with the National Youth Orchestra of Great Britain for the last two years in that work.

=== Immigration and Career in the United States ===
In 1978, Lockington moved to the United States from Great Britain. He became a citizen. He came on a scholarship to Yale University, New Haven, Connecticut, US, where he studied cello performance and conducting. In cello performance, Lockington received a master's degree. In conducting, he studied with Otto-Werner Mueller. After graduating, Lockington served as a cellist with the New Haven Symphony Orchestra and served as assistant principal cellist with the Denver Symphony Orchestra for three years before he turned to conducting.

Lockington married violinist Dylana Jenson. They have four children.

=== Grand Rapids Symphony: 1999-2015 ===
From January 1999 to May 2015, Lockington served as the music director of the Grand Rapids Symphony, Grand Rapids, Michigan. In his fourteen seasons as Music Director, he "created a lasting legacy of artistic achievements and genuine community enrichment." The New York Times commended the Grand Rapids Symphony, under Lockington's artistic leadership for "being a model in the Classical music world."

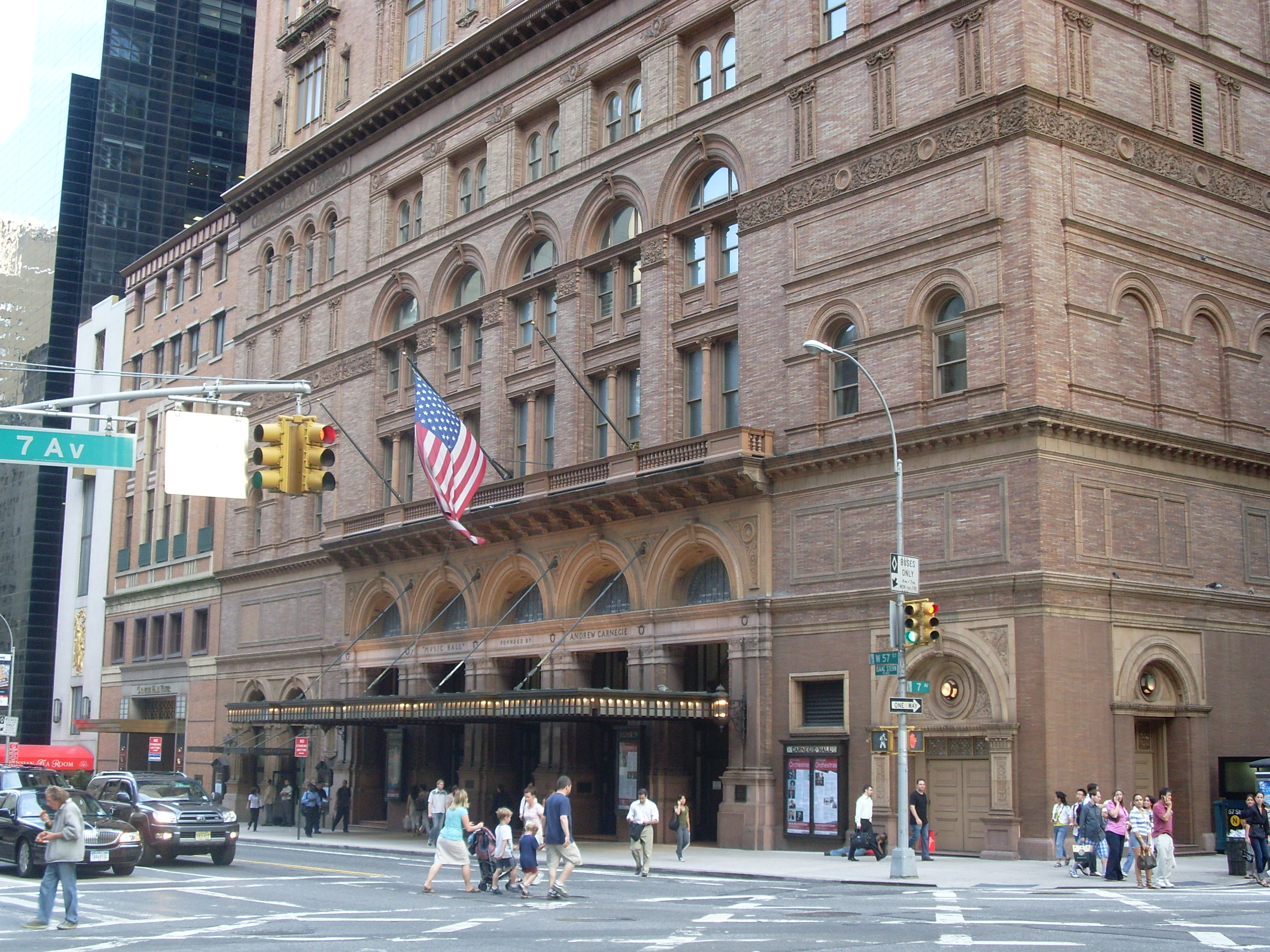
Carnegie Hall, New York City

In May 2005, Lockington Guest Conducted the Orchestra of St. Luke’s at Carnegie Hall. He considers the Grand Rapids Symphony’s seventy-fifth anniversary trip (founded in 1930) to Carnegie Hall "his greatest achievement."

In 2008, Lockington initiated the successful Grand Rapids Symphony Youth Choruses. Also, at his initiative, the Symphony reached out to new and diverse audiences through its annual community concert “Symphony with Soul.”

From May 2007 to March 2013, in addition to his work with the Grand Rapids Symphony, Lockington held the position of Music Director with the Modesto Symphony. He traveled from Grand Rapids to California monthly "to tend to his responsibilities there."

In the 2015-2016 season, Lockington was named one of three Artistic Partners with the Northwest Sinfonietta in Tacoma, Washington.

During Lockington's tenure with the Grand Rapids Symphony, pop music was incorporated into the classical repertoire. It also began collaborating with the Grand Rapids Ballet Company. The Symphony also gained national attention for its Grammy nomination in 2007 for “Invention and Alchemy,” a DVD and CD collaboration with harpist Deborah Henson-Conant.

Lockington and the orchestra’s musicians encouraged a relationship with the community by "a variety of community outreach and educational programs." The educational programs included "a side-by-side concert series that allows high school students to perform with symphony members at their school." It also included "an Artists in Residence partnership that allows symphony members to work with elementary school kids from kindergarten through the sixth grade."

During Lockington's tenure with the Grand Rapids Symphony, either he or his associate conductor John Varineau conducted the Richard and Helen DeVos Classical Series, Casual Classics Series, Edward Jones Coffee Classics, Fox Motors Pops Series, Chase Picnic Pops, and DTE Energy Foundation Family Series concerts, in addition to special events, educational and festival concerts with the Grand Rapids Symphony.

Also, under Lockington's direction, the Grand Rapids Symphony reached out to the African-American community by creating a "kind of a gospel chorus." The chorus was "a mixed chorus of community people that want to come together and celebrate performing with the orchestra.” The Grand Rapids Community Gospel Chorus grew to more than one hundred voices. It performed at the annual concert “Symphony With Soul” established by Lockington in 2002 "to help connect cultures through music."

During his tenure with the Grand Rapids Symphony, Lockington took the added position of Music Director of the Modesto Symphony Orchestra in California. He traveled to California about once a month "to tend to his responsibilities there." He also Guest Conducted for "a variety of organizations around the country."

=== January 12, 2012 Interview ===
On January 12, 2012, Lockington was in Pasadena, California to conduct the Pasadena Symphony. Laurie Niles, editor of Violentist.com, interviewed him.

As she watched Lockington direct the youth orchestra, Laurie Niles, the reporter, described Lockington: "There it was again: His assurance on the podium, his obvious love for the music, his ease of communication, the English accent, and his way of using words like "penultimate" when he speaks with kids! As in, "Please sing the penultimate chord." (They looked around in puzzlement for a moment but then figured it out!). He doesn't talk down to kids." When one of the kids asked Lockington what were his hobbies, Lockington told about "doing triathlons" and a "three-decade devotion to yoga." The latter stemmed from a back injury Lockington suffered in a bad car accident. "I wanted to make sure that I could continue to move well while I aged," he said.

Lockington told Niles that "working with students and youth can be quite helpful in the development of a conductor." He added that "I personally think it's essential. There are a lot of conductors who, in their youth, get to conduct great orchestras through whatever program, or they become an assistant or an associate. But an orchestra at a high level will play itself. Learning how to pull something apart and to be very specific about what's needed, how to get it, and even to hear clearly, it's really instructive."

Furthermore, he said that working with students and youth, "sets up the tone of how you want to lead." He said, "I like the idea of keeping everybody, not exactly guessing, but making sure that people are learning the skills of playing in orchestra: being able to go between the conductor and the page, being in the ensemble, being part of this morphing emotional entity, in time."

=== Music Director of the Pasadena Symphony: 2013-2021 ===
In 2012, Lockington guest conducted the Pasadena Symphony Orchestra in California. In 2013, he was appointed Music of the orchestra with an initial three-year contract. He began his tenure as Music Director immediately. His conducting work began with the 2013-14 Classics Series. He stepped down as music director of the Grand Rapids Symphony at the end of the 2014-15 season. In 2014-15, he began to conduct the Pasadena orchestra regularly.

When Lockington was named Music Director, Diane Rankin, President of the Pasadena Symphony Association, spoke of Lockington's “musicianship, technique, knowledge, leadership, and inspiration," which made him a "remarkable artist."

On February 19, 2017, a concert of Music for the Cello composed by the Pasadena Symphony Music Director Lockington was given in the Boston Court Performing Arts Center, Lockington was featured on the cello.

After the initial three-year contract, the Pasadena Symphony extended Lockington's contract through 2018-2019 season. In 2018, his contract was renewed again through the 2020-2021 season.

In August 2021, Lockington was "fired" from the Pasadena Symphony for refusing to take the COVID-19 vaccine. In May 2021, he was sent an email from the symphony's CEO stating that all Pasadena Symphony Association employees were required to take the vaccine. In June, Lockington sent an exemption request, citing religious and medical grounds. The symphony's attorney claimed the request was invalid, as Lockington was an independent contractor and not an employee. Lockingham sued the symphony for wrongful termination, religious discrimination, harassment, retaliation, failure to prevent discrimination and harassment, and various state Labor Code violations; seeking damages and reinstatment. In December 2023, the symphony's attorney announced that the case was settled. Terms of the settlement were not revealed. On January 16, 2024, Lockington filed a motion for dismissal with prejudice. He did not return to the Pasadena Symphony; they remained without a director until January 2025.

=== Musical career in the United States ===
Lockington served as assistant principal cellist for three years with the Colorado Symphony Orchestra in Denver, Colorado, US, before turning to conducting. While in Denver, Lockington conducted the World Premiere of William Hill’s The Raven. Hill's The Raven Hill is "a large work for orchestra and chorus based on Edgar Allen Poe's The Raven. It was commissioned by the Color ado Symphony Orchestra for the premier performance in 2015.

Lockington’s career as a conductor and music director has taken him all over the country, "from coast to coast and everywhere in between."

Lockington served as Music Director of the Cheyenne Symphony in Cheyenne, Wyoming. For three years, he held the post of Assistant Conductor with the Denver Symphony Orchestra and Opera Colorado.

In May 1993, Lockington accepted the position as Music Director of the Ohio Chamber Orchestra.

From 1992 to 1995, Lockington was assistant and, later, associate conductor of the Baltimore Symphony Orchestra. He left in 1995 to go to New Mexico.

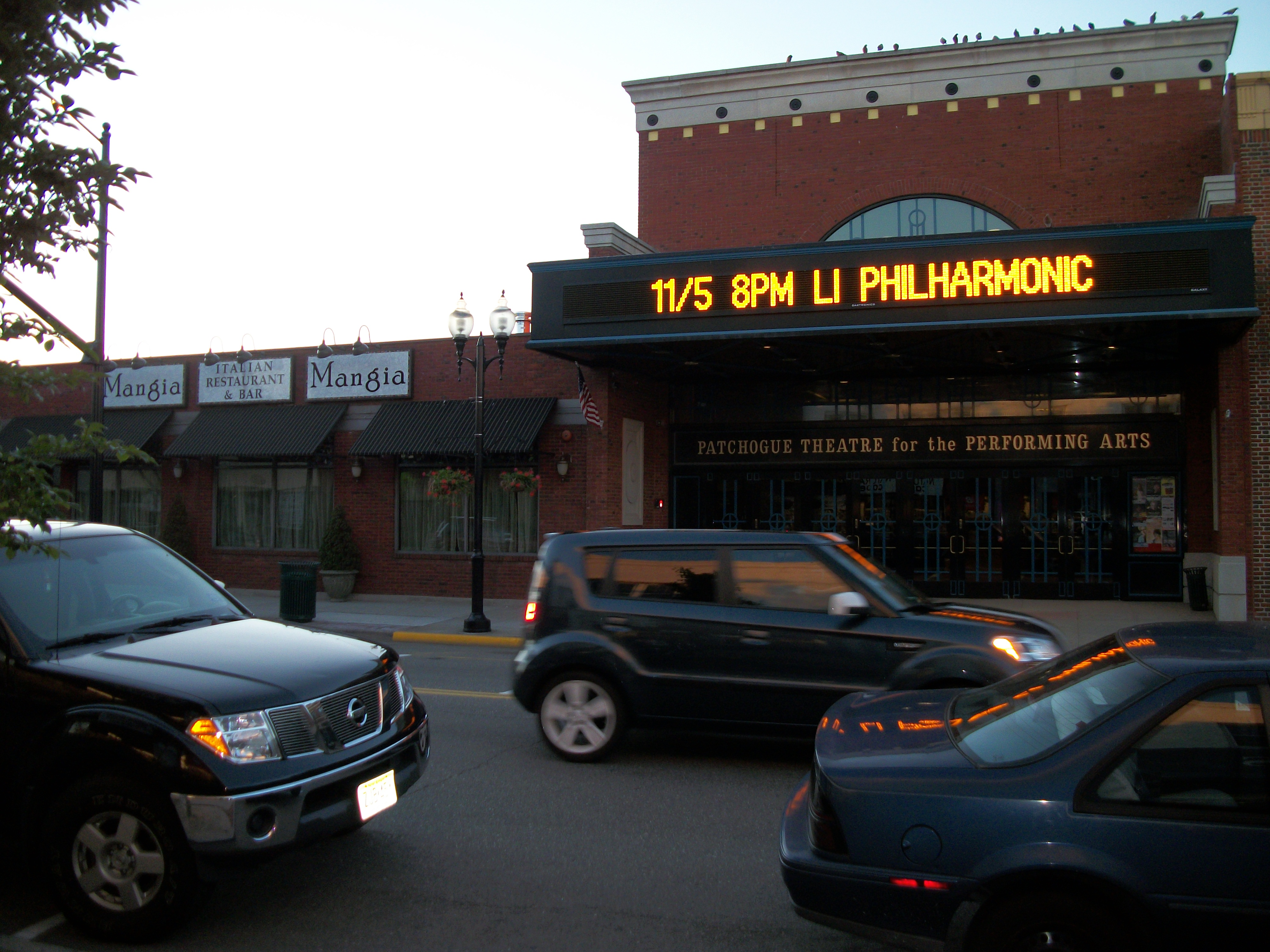
Patchogue Theatre, Long Island, NY, the primary venue of the Long Island Symphony.

Before Lockington became music director of the Grand Rapids Symphony in 1999, he held the music directorships of the Long Island Philharmonic (1996–2000) and the New Mexico Symphony Orchestra simultaneously. He lived in New Mexico and commuted between the two states.

== Guest Conducting Engagements ==
Lockington has performed guest conducting engagements throughout North America and internationally."

As of 2014, Lockington’s guest conducting engagements in the United States had included appearances with the Saint Louis Symphony, the Houston Symphony, the Detroit Symphony Orchestra, the Seattle Symphony, the Toronto Symphony Orchestra, the Vancouver Symphony Orchestra, the Colorado Symphony, the Oregon Symphony, the Phoenix Symphony, the Indianapolis Symphony Orchestra, the Pacific Symphony, the Nashville Symphony, the San Diego Symphony, the Kansas City Symphony, the Columbus Symphony Orchestra, the Louisville Orchestra, the National Arts Centre Orchestra in Ottawa, Canada, the Buffalo Philharmonic Orchestra, the Rochester Philharmonic Orchestra, the Calgary Philharmonic Orchestra. the Louisiana Philharmonic Orchestra, and the Orchestra of St. Luke's at Carnegie Hall.

Internationally, Lockington has conducted the China Broadcasting Symphony Orchestra in Beijing and in Taiwan, led the English Chamber Orchestra on a tour in Asia and appeared with the Orquesta Sinfonica del Principado de Asturias in Spain and the Northern Sinfonia in Great Britain.

From 2012 through 2016, Lockington was the principal guest conductor for the Orquesta Sinfonica del Principado de Asturias. Orquesta Sinfonica del Principado de Asturias in Spain.

== Recordings ==
In 2006, the album Invention and Album, featuring harpist Deborah Henson-Conant with the Grand Rapids Symphony and conducted by David Lockington, was nominated for Best Classical Crossover Album at the Grammy Awards. Lockington also conducted five other recordings with the Grand Rapids Symphony. These included recordings of Adolphus Hailstork’s Second and Third symphonies, released internationally by Naxos Records in 2007.

== YouTube videos ==
The following videos featuring Lockington can be seen on www.YouTube.com:

- On May 12, 2015, Lockington recorded a Thank You to all those in the Grand Rapids community who had helped support his 16-year journey as music director there.
- David Lockington performs at MySymphony360 Launch. Grand Rapids Symphony Music Director David Lockington performs his cello composition at the MySymphony360 Launch Party on November 18, 2013. He then talks about the importance of arts and culture in the community.
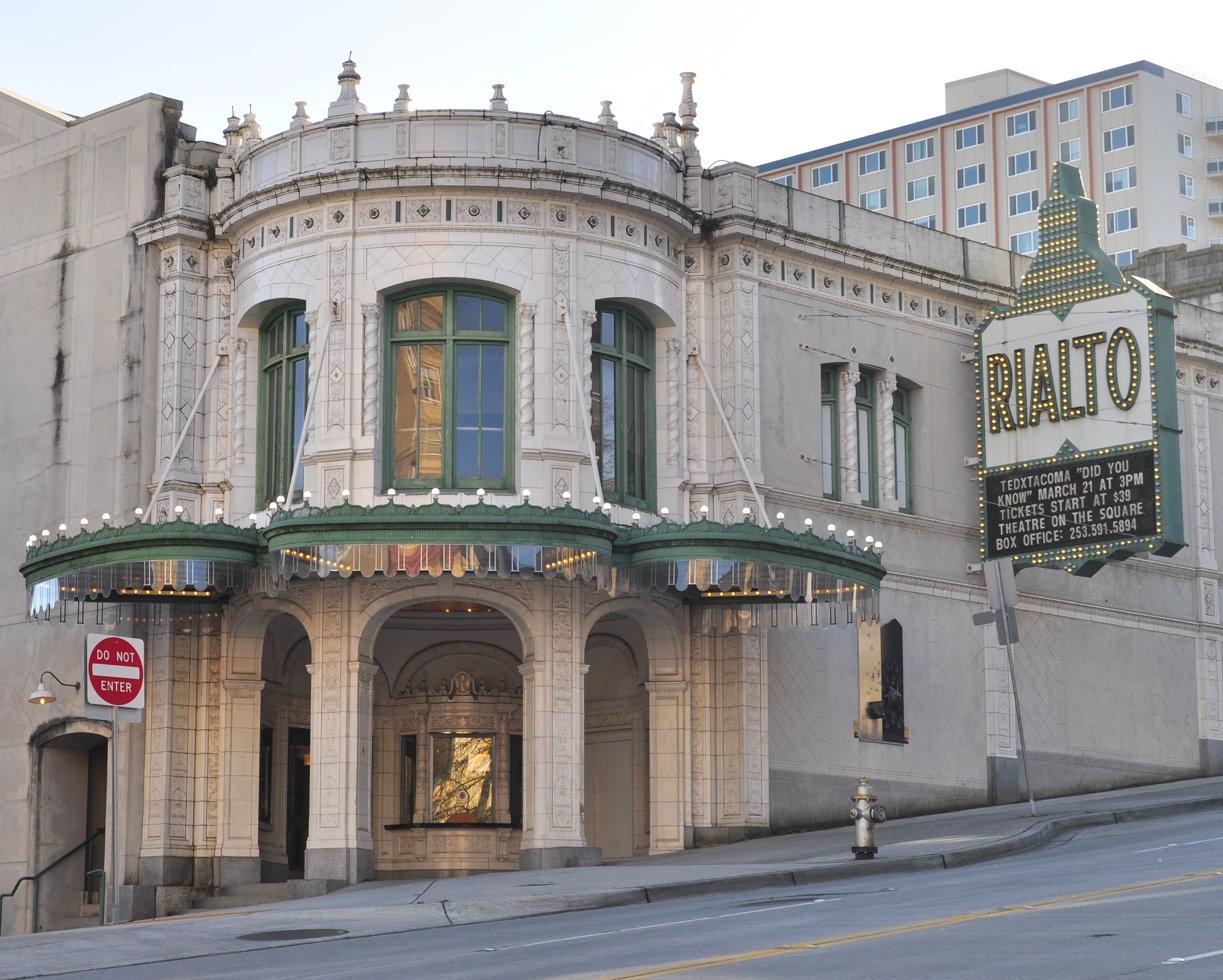
  Rialto Theatre
- David Lockington conducted Beethoven Symphony No. 8 Mvt 1 with the Northwest Sinfonietta in the Rialto Theater, Tacoma, Washington, US, on October 17, 2015.
- On January 9, 2015, Grand Rapids Symphony Music Director David Lockington talked about the Brahms Double Concerto. The concerto was featured during the Romantic Concert on January 16 at St. Cecilia Music Center, Grand Rapids, Michigan.
- Lockington directed the Symphony Orchestra of the Principality of Asturias. David Lockington directed the Symphony Orchestra of the Principality of Asturias, on May 25, 2012, in the Auditorio Príncipe Felipe, in a program that included works by Ginastera, Lalo, Bernstein and Borodin. Lockington was the principal guest director of the Orquesta Sinfonica del Principado de Asturias during the 2012-2013 season.
- Lockington and Zorita conversation. From 2012 through 2016, Lockington was the principal guest conductor for the Orquesta Sinfonica del Principado de Asturias. Orquesta Sinfonica del Principado de Asturias in Spain. On November 8, 2012, while in Spain, Lockington recorded a conversation Fernando Zorita.
- Conversation about Brahams on Ospa tv.
- Lockington's Digital Postcard: Music of Mozart. Lockington gave a preview of the April 12 and 13, 2013 concerts with the Modesto Symphony Orchestra's musicians of Mozart's finest pieces.
- Lockington at the Cook Library Center. Lockington played his cello and sang at the Grandville Avenue Arts and Humanities' Cook Library Center in Grand Rapids, Michigan.
- David's discusses Mahler's Resurrection. In this video, Lockington discussed Mahler's Resurrection Symphony. This concert was his final performance as Music Director of the Grand Rapids Symphony.
- Lockington discusses LiveArts, Part 1. Grand Rapids Symphony Music Director Lockington discusses what exactly LiveArts is.
- Lockington discusses LiveArts, Part 2. Grand Rapids Symphony Music Director Lockington discusses what exactly LiveArts is.
- Symphony in D. Video celebrating Lockington's final season with the Grand Rapids Symphony. The concert included classical, jazz and choral music.
- Beethoven, Symphony No. 5, first movement. Lockington directed Symphony No. 5 (Beethoven) on May 16, 2014.] The video was recorded in the Príncipe Felipe Auditorium (Oviedo) on May 16, 2014.
- University of Southern California, Thornton School of Music Symphony Concerto Night: 2017. Guest conductor David Lockington led the University of Southern California, Thornton School of Music Symphony. The video was recorded at the University of Southern California's Bovard Auditorium on February 24, 2017.
- Benjamin Britten's War Requiem: Story Behind the Music. David Lockington of the Grand Rapids Symphony presents the story to the World Affairs Council of Western Michigan.
- Behind the Podium with Lockington: Beethoven & Tchaikovsky Nov. 2014. Maestro David Lockington discusses Beethoven and Tchaikovsky.
- David Lockington conducts "Mass in Time of War." Lockington conducted the Northwest Sinfonietta playing "Mass in Time of War." The Northwest Sinfonietta is a professional chamber orchestra of the Puget Sound region.

Short promotional recordings
Lockington used YouTube to promote his orchestra and concerts:

- Lockington conversation. Lockington held conversation with two of his Grand Rapids Symphony musicians on Jul 10, 2013.
- Lockington invited viewers to attend the Bernstein & Gershwin concert at the Pasadena Symphony and Pops.
- Meet our Guest Conductor: David Lockington Oklahoma City Philharmonic.
- Modesto Symphony Orchestra Dr. Daniel R. Afonso, Jr., Modesto Symphony Orchestra Chorus Director, introduced a clip of the Mozart Requiem Rehearsal with Lockington and the Modesto Symphony Orchestra Chorus.
- Lockington discusses Inspired By Wagner. Grand Rapids Symphony Music Director David Lockington talked about the music of Wagner which was featured during the Inspired By Wagner Concert on January 30–31, 2015 at DeVos Performance Hall.
