= Seaver/National Endowment for the Arts Conductors Award =

American music award

The Seaver/National Endowment for the Arts Conductors Award was an award for conductors in the United States.

== History ==
The award was established in 1985 as the Affiliate Artists' Seaver Conducting Award. The award was being given every two or three years. The award was conceived by the Seaver Institute and funded by the Seaver Institute and the National Endowment for the Arts. From 1987 to 1993 it was administered by the New World Symphony of Miami. It was then administered by the Juilliard School.

== Award winners ==
- Hugh Wolff and Kent Nagano, 1985
- Catherine Comet, Jahja Ling, and Neal Stulberg, 1988
- Kenneth Jean and Carl St. Clair, 1990
- David Loebel and Christopher Wilkins, 1992
- Robert Spano, 1994
- Alan Gilbert and David Robertson, 1997
- William Eddins, 2000
- JoAnn Falletta and Miguel Harth-Bedoya, 2002
