= Marcelo Lehninger =

Music director

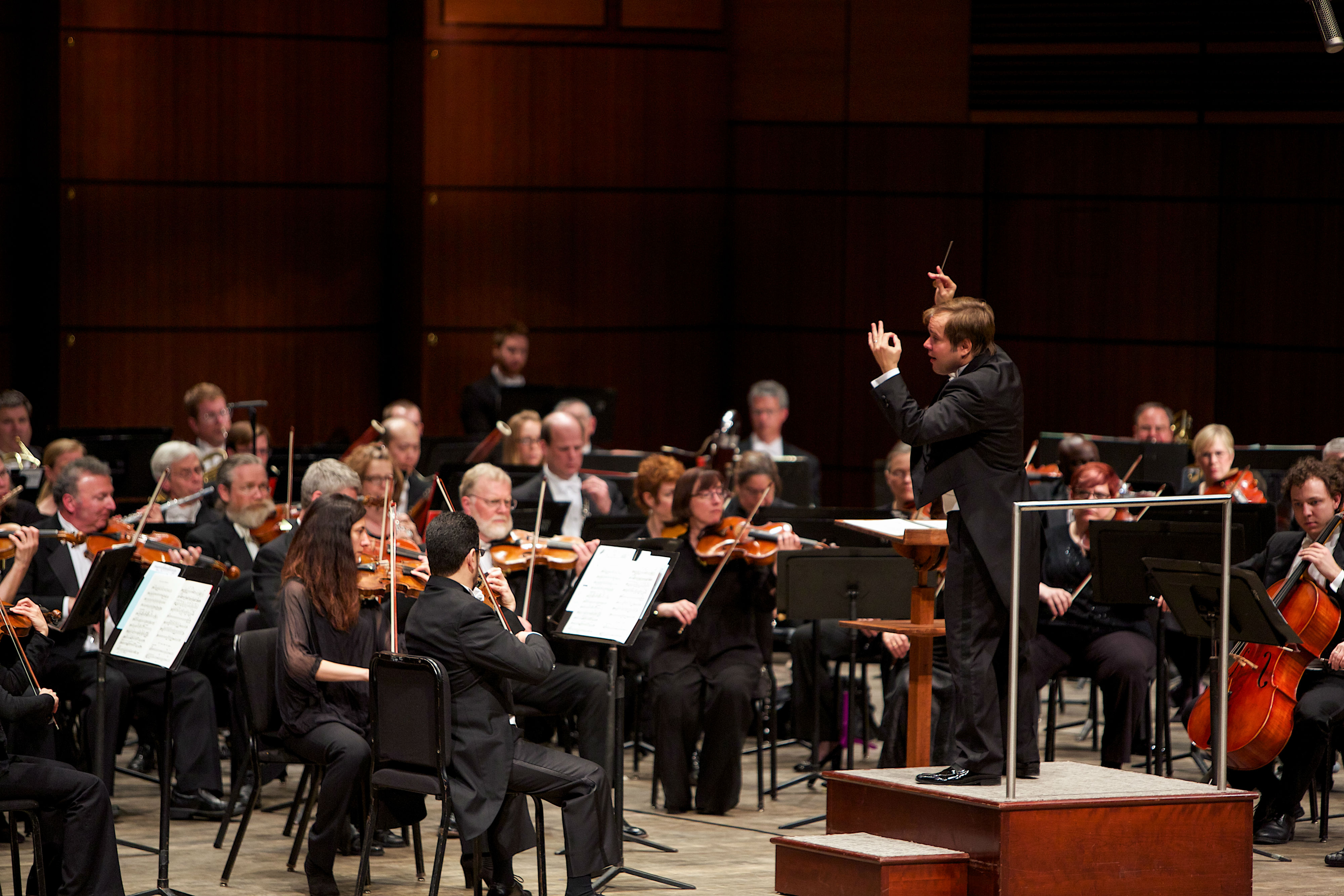
Music Director Marcelo Lehninger conducting the Grand Rapids Symphony in DeVos Performance Hall in Grand Rapids, Michigan. Photo by Terry Johnston for the Grand Rapids Symphony

Marcelo Lehninger (born 1 October 1979, Rio de Janeiro, Brazil) is music director of the Grand Rapids Symphony, a professional orchestra located in Michigan, U.S.A., and artistic director of the Bellingham Festival of Music in Washington State.

== Career ==
Lehninger became the 14th music director of the Grand Rapids Symphony in June 2016. Prior to his appointment with the Grand Rapids Symphony, Lehninger served as music director of the New West Symphony in Los Angeles from 2011 to 2016.

== Awards ==
During his tenure with the New West Symphony, Lehninger was awarded the 2014 Helen M. Thompson Award for an Emerging Music Director, an award given once every two years by the League of American Orchestras.

== Boston Symphony Orchestra ==
In 2010, Lehninger was appointed assistant conductor of the Boston Symphony Orchestra by James Levine, who was music director at the time. In October 2010, Lehninger made his debut leading the BSO in a performance of Beethoven's Violin Concerto with soloist Pinchas Zukerman. In March 2011, Lehninger stepped in on three days’ notice for Levine to rehearse and lead the BSO in concerts including the world premiere of a new Violin Concerto by Harrison Birtwistle. Shortly after the premiere in Boston, Lehninger led the BSO in performances of that program in New York City’s Carnegie Hall. In 2013, Lehninger was elevated to the rank of associate conductor, a position he held with the BSO for two seasons until 2015.

== Early work ==
An alumnus of the National Conducting Institute, Lehninger made a successful debut with the National Symphony Orchestra in 2007 at the John F. Kennedy Center for the Performing Arts in Washington, D.C., and was invited to conduct the NSO again in 2008. During the 2007–08 season, Lehninger served as music advisor of The Orchestra of the Americas. In the summer of 2008, Maestro Lehninger toured with TOA and pianist Nelson Freire in South America, conducting concerts in Argentina, Brazil and Uruguay. In 2008, Lehninger was awarded the First Felix Mendelssohn-Bartholdy Scholarship, sponsored by the American Friends of the Mendelssohn Foundation. In 2011, he participated in the Bruno Walter National Conductor Preview, organized by the League of American Orchestras, conducting the Louisiana Philharmonic Orchestra.

== Early life and education ==
Born into a musical family, Lehninger is the son of German violinist Erich Lehninger and Brazilian pianist Sônia Goulart. While growing up, he studied both of his parents' instruments. Lehninger holds a bachelor's degree in conducting from the Brazilian Conservatory of Music and a master's degree from the Conductors Institute at New York's Bard College, where he studied conducting under Harold Farberman and composition with Laurence Wallach. His mentors also include Kurt Masur, Mariss Jansons, Leonard Slatkin and Roberto Tibiriçá.

Lehninger resides with his wife, Laura Anne Krech, and their daughters near Grand Rapids, Michigan.
