= José Echániz =

Cuban pianist (1905–1969)

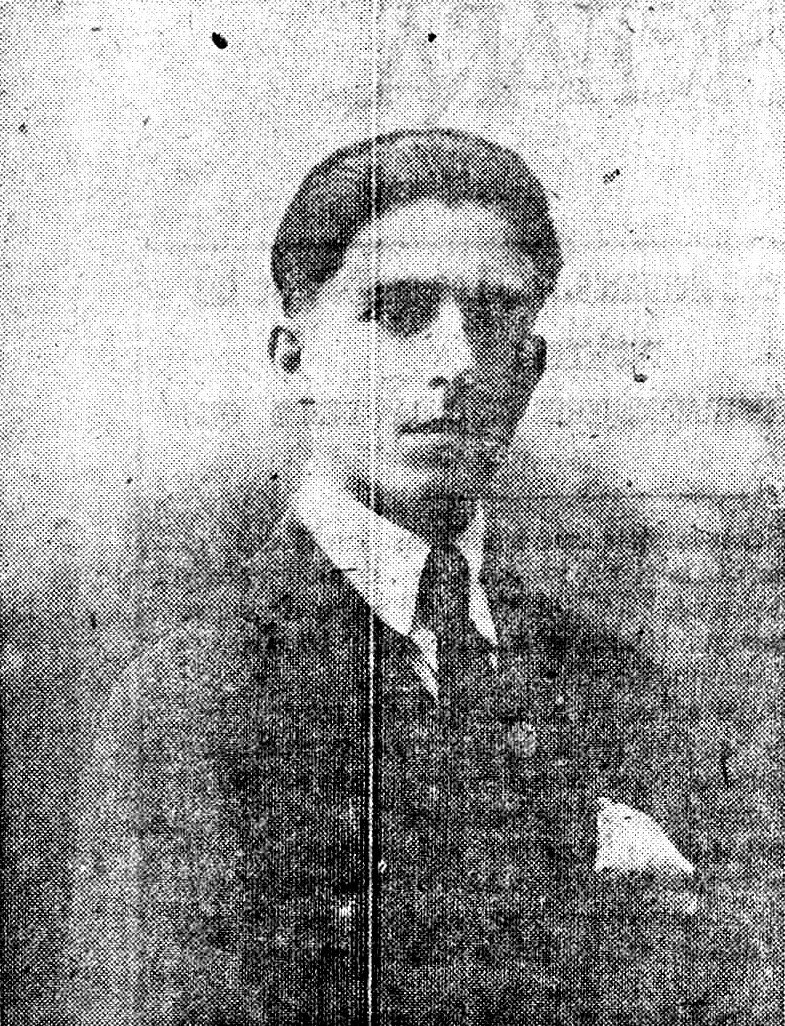

Background information
- Born: José Echániz y Justiniani; June 4, 1905; Havana, Cuba
- Died: December 30, 1969 (aged 64) Pittsford, New York
- Occupation: Musician
- Instrument: Piano

José Echániz (1905–1969) was a Cuban-born pianist and musician. A child prodigy, he studied at the Falcón Conservatory in Havana, where he was awarded the title "professor of piano" at age 14. During the 1920s, he toured the US and appeared in Europe. During the 1930s, he was a featured soloist with orchestras in the US and appeared under the batons of many distinguished conductors. Echániz joined the Eastman School faculty in 1944. Throughout his 25-year teaching career, Echániz maintained an active career as a recitalist in Europe, the US, and the Caribbean, as an orchestral soloist, and as a recording artist.

== Early life ==
José Echániz y Justiniani was born in the town of Guanabacoa in Havana, Cuba on June 4, 1905.

Echániz received his first piano lessons from his father, who was a professor at the Conservatorio Nacional Hubert de Blanck. He later studied with Ignacio Tellería, until he entered the Conservatorio Falcón in La Habana under the tutelage of Alberto Falcón himself, from which he graduated with the title Professor of Piano at the age of fourteen.

== US debut and performances in Europe ==
On January 4, 1922, he made his American debut at Town Hall in New York. He toured the world with Tito Schipa, appearing with the famous Italian tenor as his accompanist in joint recitals, and in recordings. While touring with Schipa, Echániz also gave solo recitals.

During his career Echániz appeared in the United States and in Europe as a recitalist, and also as soloist with major orchestras under conductors such as Gonzalo Roig, José Iturbi, Rudolf Ganz, Erick Leinsdorf, Howard Hanson, Frederick Stock, Vladimir Golschmann, Sir Eugene Goosens, Dimitri Mitropoulos, Paul White, Guy Fraser Harrison, Laszlo Somogyi, Theodore Bloomfield, and Massimo Preccia.

== Teaching career and conducting ==
He taught piano at his own studio in La Habana from 1924 to 1932. From 1948 to 1954, he was music director of the Grand Rapids Symphony in Grand Rapids, Michigan. Echániz held a professorship at the Conservatory of Music at James Milliken University in Decatur, Illinois for twelve years, later joining the faculty of the Eastman School of Music in a full-time teaching position, all the while continuing his active career as recitalist and soloist in the United States and abroad. Echániz was also the founder of the Lake Placid Chamber Music Festival and School. From 1963 until his death he was its director, and he was also the pianist for the Lake Placid Trio. During the regular academic year, Echániz was also active in clinics and music workshops throughout the United States.

== Last performance and death ==
Echániz had been scheduled to give his first New York recital in eleven years in December 1968, but on the night of the performance at Philharmonic Hall at New York's Lincoln Center, he was so ill from what was believed to be Hong Kong flu that he was able to perform only the first half of the program. All upcoming appearances were cancelled, including a scheduled Kilbourn Hall recital at the Eastman School of Music in Rochester, New York state in celebration of his twenty-fifth anniversary. Instead, director of the school Walter Hendl gave a dinner in honor of Echániz at Hutchinson House, Rochester. on November 4, 1969, with some two hundred guests in attendance.

José Echániz died on December 30, 1969, in his Pittsford, New York home, after suffering from cancer for several months. At the time of his passing his immediate survivors included his wife Dulce; two sons, José Jr. and Carlos; and a daughter, María.

== Audio Recordings ==
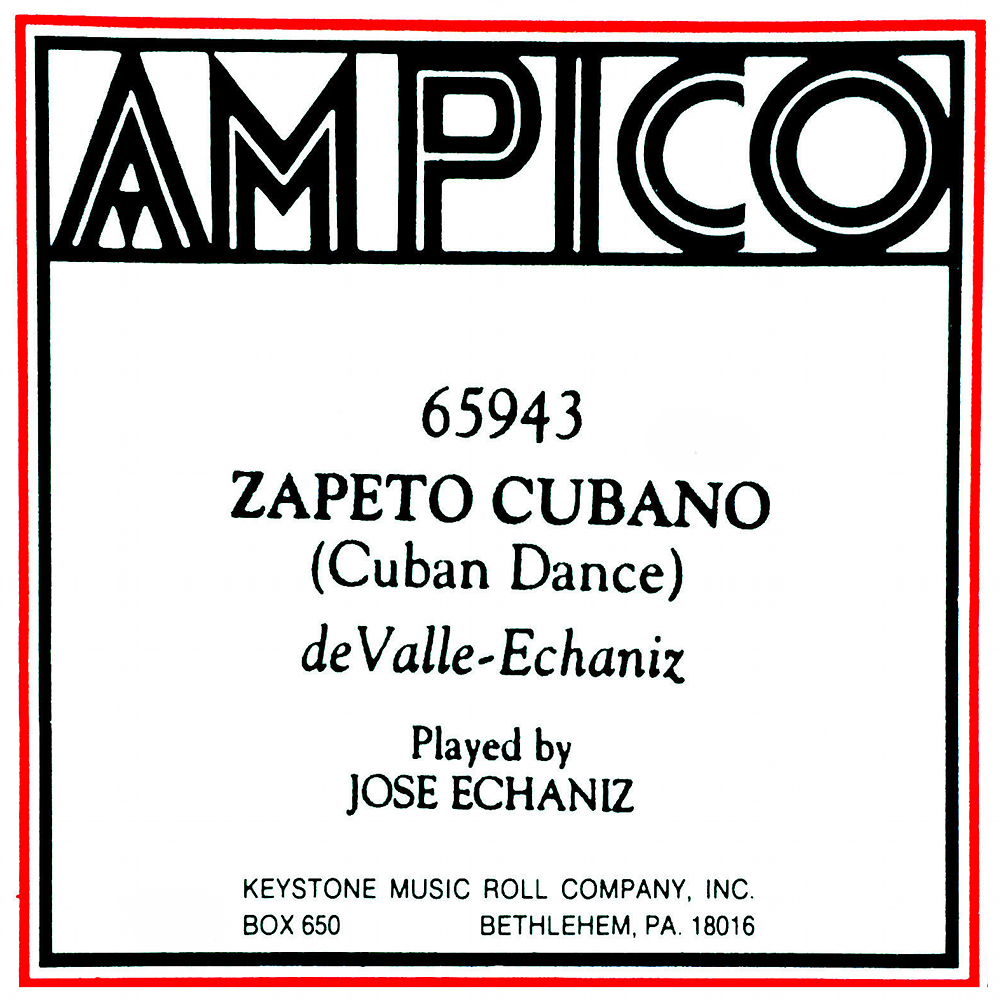
Label from an AMPICO piano roll, 1920s. "Cuban Dance" played by José Echániz.

In the 1920s, while still a teenager, Echániz made his first recordings, piano rolls for the Ampico and Duo-Art companies, recording the works of Cervantes, Vogrich and Soro. As well as the standard piano literature, these recording included his own arrangements of the works of other composers, and his own compositions. The 1930s saw him move into the era of electrical recordings, which he made as a soloist for Columbia Records. He also made several recordings as accompanist for Tito Schipa.

=== Discography ===
From 1925 a number of recordings on the Victor and Columbia labels, initially accompanying Schipa, and then as a solo performer.

- Granados – 12 Spanish Dances — Westminster WL 5181 (1953)
- Piano Music Of De Falla — Westminster WL 5218 (1953)
- Granados – Goyescas / El Pelele — Westminster WL 5322 (1954)
- Lecuona — Westminster WL 5343 (1954)
- Mompou / Albéniz — Westminster WL 5382 (1954)
- Villa-Lobos – A Prole do Bebê (The Baby's Family) — Westminster XWN 18065 (Nov 1954)
- Turina – Danzas Fantásticas / Danzas Gitanas / Mujeres Españolas — Westminster XWN 18185 (1956)
- Latin American Rhythms — Westminster XWN 18430 (1957)
- A Tribute To Villa-Lobos — Westminster XWN 18929
- Albéniz – Iberia / Navarra / Cantos de España — Westminster WAL 219 / XWN 2217 (2LPs) (1958)
- José Echániz Plays The Two And Three Part Inventions Of Johann Sebastian Bach — Musical Heritage Society MHS-611
- Spanish Piano Music – José Echániz — Musical Heritage Society MHS-811 (1968)

The Westminster recordings of José Echániz are owned by the Universal Music Group. Those interested in the digital release of the Westminster discography of José Echániz are advised to contact Eloquence, Decca, and Deutsche Grammophon. These three labels are the legal owners of these recordings. See links below.
