= Cecilia Paredes =

Peruvian-born multimedia artist (born 1950)

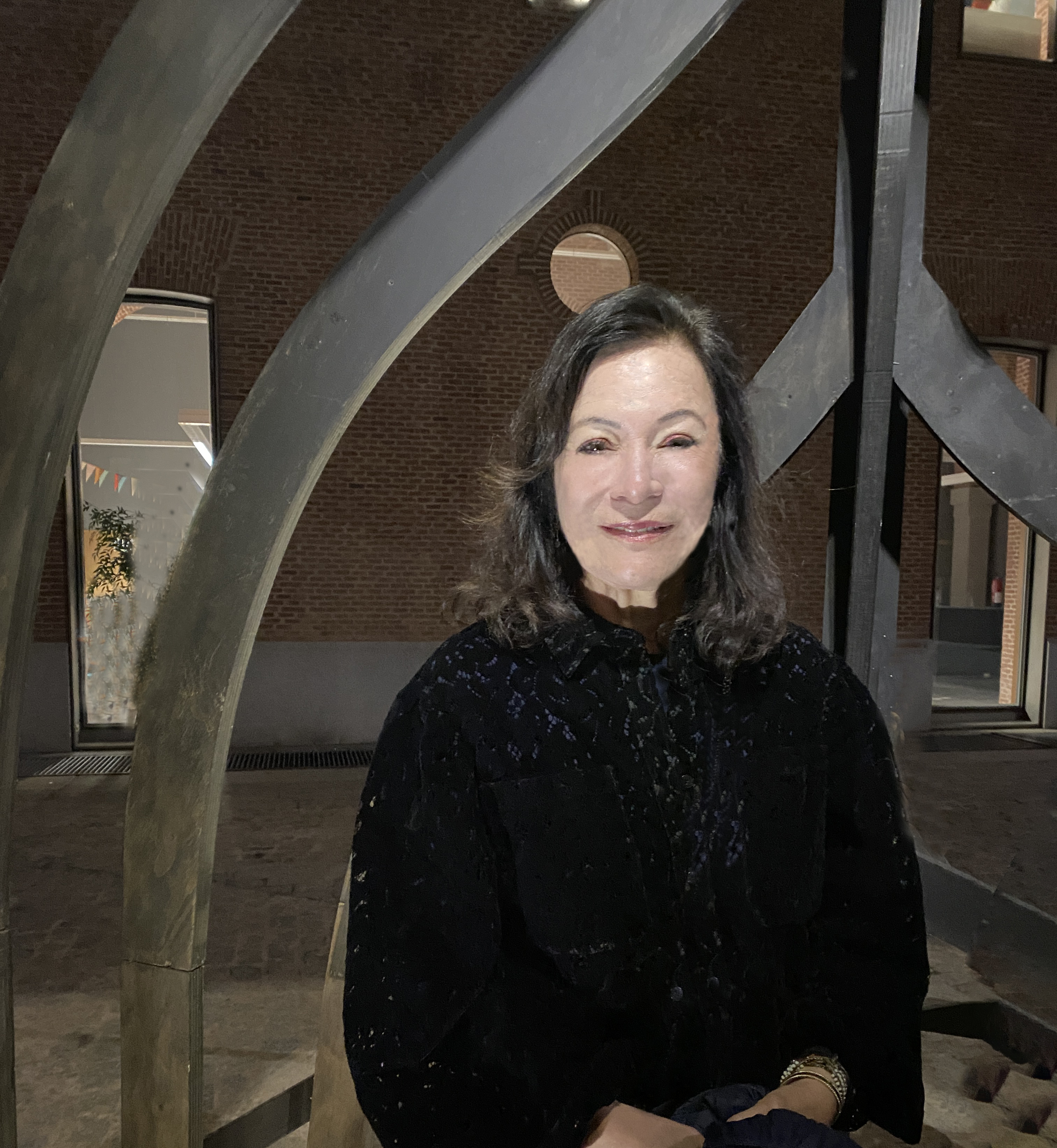
- Cecilia Paredes at the Centro de Cultura Contemporánea Conde Duque, Madrid, 2022
- Born: 1950 (age 75–76); Lima, Peru
- Education: Pontifical Catholic University of Peru
- Known for: Body painting
- Spouse: Jay Reise

Cecilia Paredes (born 1950) is a Peruvian-born multimedia artist residing in Philadelphia. Her primary themes include the power of nature, femininity, and migration, which have been subjects of many of her shows. She frequently utilizes natural elements, often recycled waste materials and primarily organic ones, in her installations. One of her best-known works is "Paisajes" in which she camouflages herself and uses her own figure as a canvas for body painting.

== Education and career ==
Born in Lima, Paredes has lived outside of Peru since her youth. She studied plastic arts in the Pontifical Catholic University of Peru, in the Cambridge Arts and Crafts School in England and the Scuola del Nudo of the Academy of Fine Art in Rome. She completed residencies at the University of Pennsylvania and the Banff Centre of Canada.

During the 1970s, as a student in Lima, Paredes engaged in intense political activism which caused her to be exiled from Peru, along with her husband. She lived in Mexico for 5 years and in Costa Rica for almost 25 years. She currently lives and works in San José, Costa Rica and in the United States, in Philadelphia,

Collectively she has shown her works in various biannual shows such as the Havana Biennial, Venice Biennale or the Bienal de Arquitectura de Canarias. She has been an invited international artist in the Feria FIA de Caracas in 2008.

Her works have been exhibited in places such as the Tabacalera Promoción del Arte (Madrid, 2015), the Hermitage Museum, the Vladimir Palace (Russia, 2013) and the Museo de la Fotografía (Colombia, 2013).

== Work ==
External images
- Examples of Cecilia Paredes' artwork
- “Cecilia Paredes at FotoSeptiembre USA 2015", September 5, 2015, FOTOSEPTIEMBRE USA
- “Papagallo, 2004”, Art Works for Change.
- “Cecilia Paredes", Contemporary Art Curator Magazine

Paredes herself is often the central subject not only of her performances but also of her photographs and art, and yet, frequently she is not recognized and appears hidden among the natural materials that she uses, or appears blended and transformed into folds of fabric. In her photographs Paredes camouflages herself as animals or mythological beings, often surrounded by backgrounds of ornamental flowers.

She is primarily known for her permanent photo series "Paisajes" in which she explores the juxtaposition of her body with patterns and the surfaces beneath it. These photographs are composed by way of the selection of a structured background, such as a paper floral tapestry, and her intricate painting of her body so that it matches. The inevitable outlines of her form for the most part encircle her and manifest themselves, depending upon the angle of the camera. In some cases, only a shock of dark hair reveals that a person is in the photograph. Reviews of her shows have stated that Paredes intentionally puts the viewer off-balance by "erasing the line between body and background, throwing what’s real into question in both the artist and her backdrop, and Paredes rips off the stable ground beneath her viewers’ feet".

María José Monge, Curator of Visual Arts of the Museo of the Banco Central of Costa Rica, explains that during the time that Paredes lived in Costa Rica she began the precedent of the developing object works and installations, using natural resources as primary source material and in the use of the body itself as a reference and expressive medium. ("En el período que Cecilia vivió en Costa Rica sentó precedentes en el desarrollo de obras objetuales e instalaciones, en el empleo de recursos naturales como materia prima y en el uso del cuerpo propio como referente y medio expresivo”)

As themes of migration and displacement dominate her work, along with the use of natural elements, when asked about the impact of physical location on her art, Paredes replies that: "...Costa Rica, for example, gives you exuberant nature, whereas Peru gives you the highlands as a predominant image so you have to attend to those influences. Pennsylvania gives me wonderful forests, for example. It’s one of the most serene and beautiful places I have been to and I’m very attached to it."

Among her artistic influences are Remedios Varo and Leonora Carrington who Paredes refers to as "sus madres" ("her mothers"). She explains that "They opened the door to show me that everything is possible, everything is makeable." (Ellas -explica- me abrieron la puerta para decirme que todo es posible, todo es factible). She also recognizes in her work the influence of Kiki Smith, Louise Bourgeois, William Kentridge and Anselm Kiefer.

One of Paredes' photographs has been used as cover art for a reprint of the Brian Moore novel Judith Hearn, which was later republished and produced as a stage play and film "The Lonely Passion of Judith Hearn".

Paredes' works served as the inspiration for Argentinean actress and singer Mía Maestro in her 2014 music video "Blue Eyed Sailor", directed by Guillermo Navarro and Juan Azulay.

== Personal life ==
Paredes has two sons, Simon Flores (born 1975) and Matias Flores (born 1977), and is married to the composer and University of Pennsylvania professor Jay Reise. She has collaborated with him, incorporating video into live musical performances, such as The Gift to Urashima Taro.

== Recent exhibits ==
- 2016 "El perpetuo Errante", Museo Banco Central, Costa Rica
- 2015 Tabacalera Promoción de Arte, Madrid, España.

Bienal de La Habana 2015. Museo Orgánico Romerillo, Cuba.

- 2014 Museo del Espacio, Individual. Samara, Russia.

Pingyao Art Festival, Shanxi, China. Lingshi Print Festival, Lingshi, China.

- 2013 Hermitage Museum - Individual exhibit in the Vladimir Palace, Saint Petersburg, Russia.

Museo Pedro de Osma, Individual exhibition, Lima, Peru.

Bienal de Fotografía, Bogotá, Colombia.

Bienal de Arezzo, Italy.

Arte para el Cambio, Madrid, Spain.

- 2012 KIAF Art Siddhartha, Art Festival Katmandú, Nepal.
- 2010 Museo de Arte Moderno, Individual MMOMA Moscow, Russia.

Instituto Cultural Peruano Norteamericano, Individual exhibition, Lima, Peru.

Banco Mundial, Washington, D.C., USA. Individual exhibition.

== Awards and distinctions ==
- 2014 Prize for Excellence Pingyao Photo Festival, China
- 2012 Escuela Nacional de Bellas Artes Artista Invitada Charla Artística, Lima, Peru.
- 2012 Taller Comalapa, Guatemala, Invited Artist
- 2011 University of Texas, Invited Artist, San Antonio Texas, United States
- 2010 Guanlan Taller de Impresión, Artist in Residence Gualan, Shenzhen, China
- 2009 Premio Mejor Artista Extranjera Santiago, Chile
- 2009 Premio "40th Street Award" Philadelphia, United States
- 2008 Artista Invitada a la FIA, Feria Internacional de Caracas, Venezuela
- 2002 First Honorable Mention, Bienal Centroamericana, Managua, Nicaragua
- 2000 Banff Centre for the Arts, Canada, Artist in Residence, Discovery Residency
- 1998 Rockefeller Foundation, Residencia Bellagio, Bellagio, Italy
- 1998 Premio Nacional de Grabado, Lima, Peru

== Collections ==
- Museum of Modern Art MMOMA Moscow, Russia
- Banco Mundial, Washington, D.C., US
- Deustche Bank, New York, US
- San Antonio Museum of Art, Texas, US
- Museo de Arte y Diseño Contemporáneo, Costa Rica
- Colección Daniel Yankelewitz, Costa Rica
- Solita Mishaan Collection, Florida, US
- Colección Ernesto Ventós, Barcelona, Spain
- Museo del Barrio, New York, US
- Tomás Ybarra-Frausto Collection, San Antonio, Texas, US
- Museo de Arte Moderno, Panama
- Guanlan Print, Shenzhen, China
- University of San Antonio, Texas, US
- Universidad Nacional de Ingeniería, Lima, Peru
- Lehigh University Collection, Pennsylvania, US
- Colección María De Corral, Madrid, Spain
- Colección Teorética, Costa Rica
- Colección Sagrario Pérez Soto Caracas, Venezuela
- Art Nexus, Florida, US
- Colección Centro Wifredo Lam, Havana, Cuba
- Universidad de Salamanca, Spain

== See also ==
- Body art
