= Esther Barazzone =

American historian and college president

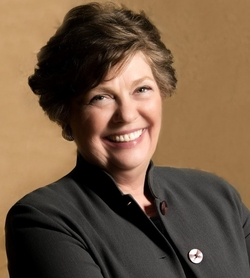

Esther Barazzone (born 1946) is an independent American consultant in higher education governance and leadership, and president emerita of Chatham University in Pittsburgh, Pennsylvania. As president of Chatham from 1992 to 2016, when she retired, she was one of the longest-serving university presidents in the U.S. She maintains roles in several organizations supporting international and U.S. higher learning, women’s leadership, and sustainability.

When Barazzone became president, Chatham was a women’s liberal arts college. During her tenure, it became a coeducational university and expanded its academic program, including those focused on environment studies, international studies, and women's studies. The university received increased attention and was included in various national and international ranking.

== Early life and education ==
Born in 1946 in Charleston, West Virginia, Barazzone grew up in Bluefield, West Virginia, and attended high school in Punta Gorda, Florida. She earned a BA in philosophy and history from New College, Sarasota, Florida (a tutorial institution modeled after the New College, Oxford), where she was one of the first two students admitted and a Charter Scholar. Her experience with New College's experimental program guided her philosophy throughout her career, emphasizing institutional innovation and “a high level of accountability in student learning and great levels of freedom and support in helping them get there.”

After studying history in Spain on a Fulbright scholarship, she was named a graduate Fellow of the Faculty at Columbia University, where she earned an MA and a PhD in European Intellectual history. Her dissertation was on Sir James Mackintosh, a Scottish historian, jurist and member of Parliament (1765-1832). She later earned certificates from the Wharton School of Business Administration and the Harvard Institute for Educational Management.

== Early career ==
Barazzone taught modern European intellectual history at Hamilton and Kirkland Colleges, and then held positions as a fundraiser and an academic dean at the University of Pennsylvania, Swarthmore College, and the Philadelphia College of Textiles and Science (later renamed Philadelphia University). [Chatham History, p. 125] The scope of her teaching and administrative experience made her attractive to Chatham’s board in 1991 when it was looking for a new president to revitalize and rescue the financially troubled Pittsburgh college.

== Presidency of Chatham University ==
Building on Chatham’s academic strengths, early in her presidency Barazzone led the creation of coeducational graduate and professional programs as a complement to the undergraduate liberal arts majors. These new programs were in such fields as the environment, sustainability, health sciences and creative writing. Barazzone also oversaw the development of programs to prepare students and members of the community for civic leadership, entrepreneurship and political engagement. Building around an endowed chair named for philanthropist Elsie Hilliard Hillman, Chatham created a women’s studies program and a Center for Women and Politics in Pennsylvania that strengthened Chatham’s focus on how to run for and succeed in public office. Chatham became fully coeducational in 2015; these women’s programs continue, however, to play a role in defining the institution. It created a Center for Women’s Entrepreneurship that in 2019 was ranked “nationally outstanding” by the Small Business Administration. Under the umbrella of the Chatham’s Women’s Institute, all of these activities continue to promote women’s leadership and opportunities.

Among Chatham’s major accomplishments during Barazzone’s tenure were creation of the Eden Hall campus and the Falk School of Sustainability. Inspired by its alumna Rachel Carson (class of 1929), Chatham became a national and international pacesetter in sustainability when, in 2008, the Eden Hall Foundation made Chatham a gift of 388 acres of land in Pittsburgh’s northern suburbs. Sigo Falk, a Pennsylvania philanthropist and member of Chatham’s board, and the Falk Foundation, with a gift of $15 million, funded The Falk School of Sustainability at Eden Hall and the creation of its campus – the world’s first sustainable campus and a learning/living laboratory.

Barazzone participated in local, state, and national organizations during her Chatham tenure. In Pittsburgh and the Allegheny County region, she served on the Allegheny Conference (the area’s economic development organization), the board of the University of Pittsburgh Medical Center, and various public advisory boards including the Intergovernmental Cooperation Authority (Pittsburgh’s state financial oversight board) and as co-chair of the Allegheny County Sanitary Authority task force on water quality. For many years she served on the board of the Claude Worthington Benedum Foundation, which funds education and other services in West Virginia and Southwestern Pennsylvania. Statewide, Barazzone was the chair of the Association of Independent Colleges and Universities of Pennsylvania. Nationally she served on many boards, including those of the Public Leadership Education Network for women (which she chaired), the Association for the Advancement of Sustainability in Higher Education, the Tuition Plan Consortium (the only non-state-sponsored 529 savings plan), and an advisory board for the Institute for International Education, affiliated with the U.S. Government’s Fulbright programs

== Post-Presidency ==
Barazzone is currently a trustee of the University of the District of Columbia and of the American University of Rome (Italy). She is also a director of Dollar Bank, a multistate full-service financial institution based in Pittsburgh.

== Awards and recognition ==
When Barrazzone retired the university named the main building on the new Eden Hall campus in her honor and awarded her its Rachel Carson Award for distinguished leadership in sustainability. Allegheny County and the city of Pittsburgh declared April 26, 2016 “Esther Barazzone Day.” Among the many commendations from her community are the PNC Women of Legacy Award, the Pittsburgh Business Times Lifetime Achievement and CEO of the Year Award, History Maker in Education designation by the Senator John Heinz III History Center, and Distinguished Daughter of Pennsylvania, an honor bestowed by the governor.

For her work in international education, she was awarded honorary degrees and citations from universities in Japan, Korea, and Pakistan, and the Gandhi, King, Ikeda Award for Outstanding Leadership for Peace and Humanitarianism from Morehouse College. Her work on behalf of the advancement of women earned her the Women’s Leadership Assembly’s Susan B. Anthony Leadership Award and the National Diversity Council’s “Most Powerful and Influential Women” designation.

== Family ==
Barazzone has two sons, Matthew Reise and Nicholas Reise, with her first husband, the composer Jay Reise; [Sewald 2016] the couple divorced in 2004. Barazzone married Sam Black, a Washington, D.C. civic leader and attorney, in 2015. They have a combined family of five adult children, three daughters-in-law and four grandchildren.
