= Kirkland College =

Women's college in Clinton, New York (1965–1978)

Coordinates: 43°2′54.5″N 75°24′34.05″W

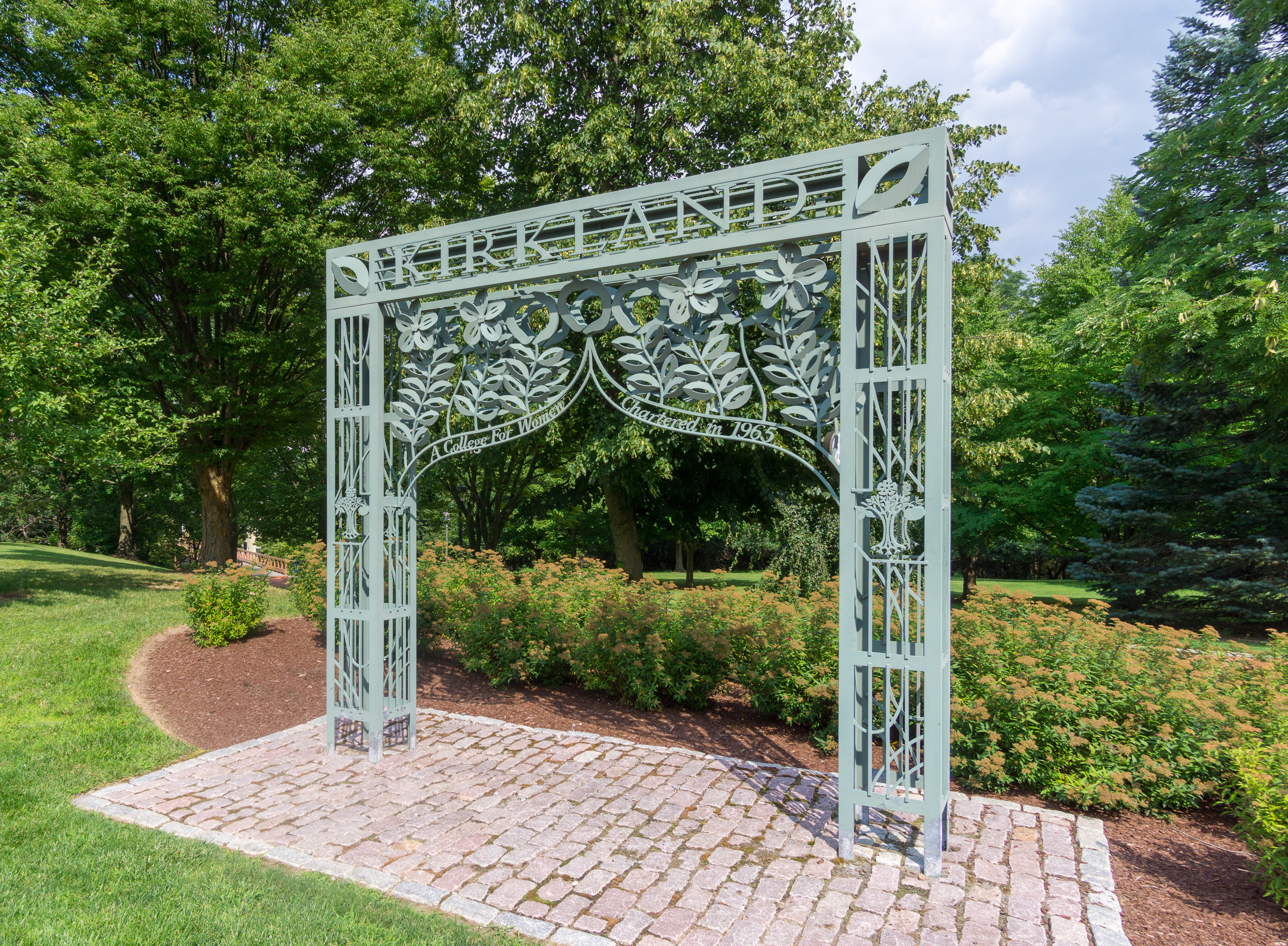
- This sign for Kirkland College was retained by Hamilton College
- Type: Private Women's College
- Active: 1965–1978
- Location: Clinton, Oneida County, New York

Kirkland College was a small, private liberal arts women's college from 1965 to 1978 in Kirkland, New York, United States. It was a female counterpart to Hamilton College, at that time all male, and its campus was adjacent to Hamilton's. It was named for Samuel Kirkland, who founded the Hamilton-Oneida Academy, origin of Hamilton College (and for whom, some felt, Hamilton should have been named). It was not successful financially, so Hamilton absorbed Kirkland on June 30, 1978, has maintained its archives and financial endowment, and supports its alumnae community.

== History ==
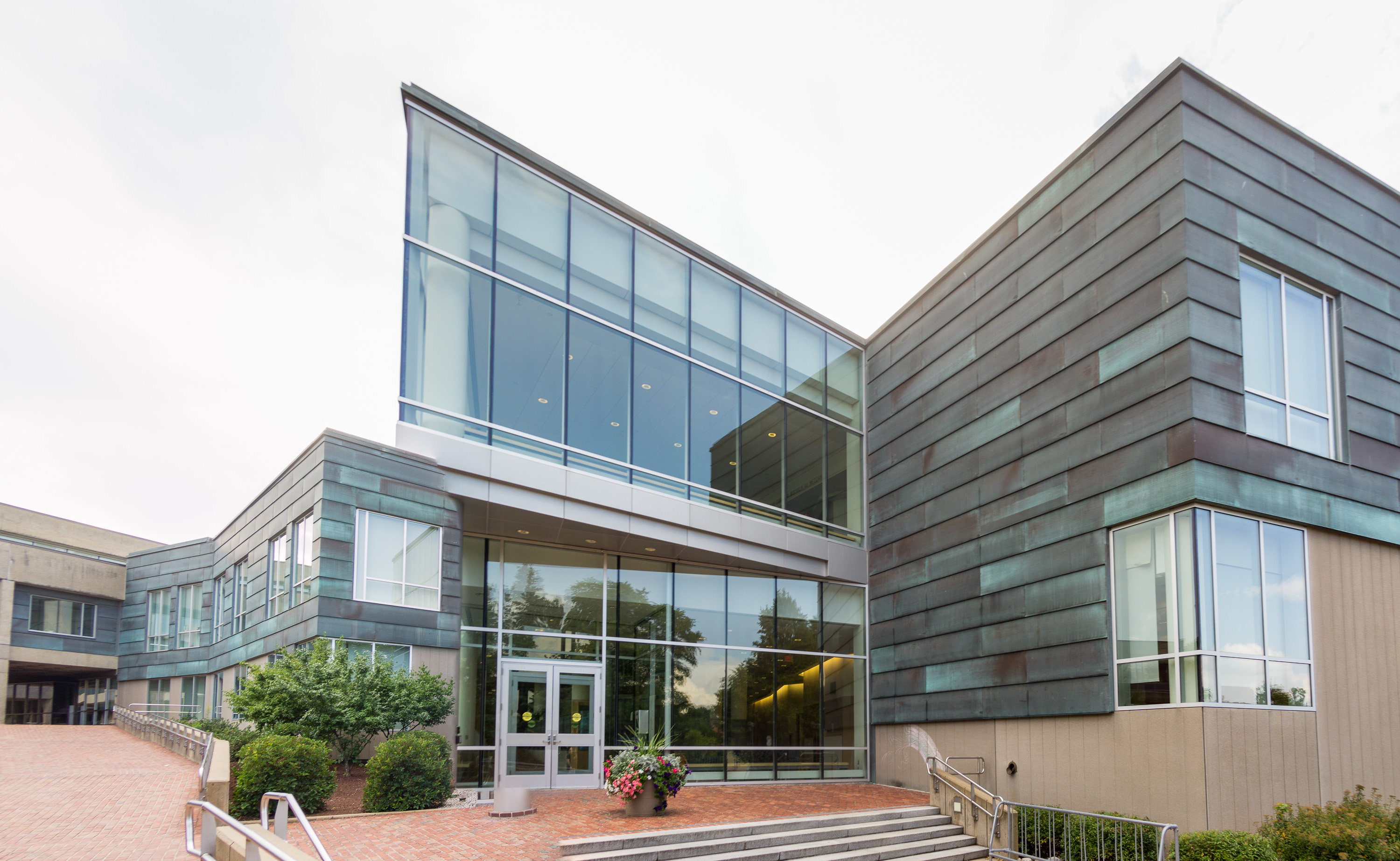
The Kirner-Johnson building was built in 1968 as the main building of Kirkland College, and was renovated by Hamilton College in 2009.

Planning for Kirkland began during the 1962-1963 academic year through the influence of then-Hamilton College president Robert W. McEwen. It was named for Samuel Kirkland, the founder of Hamilton. Hamilton was a men's college. Kirkland College, a college for women, was envisioned as the first of several institutions which would form a cluster similar to the Claremont Colleges. Though the "cluster" vision was never achieved, two factors led to a more innovative and experimental nature at Kirkland: first, the introduction of progressive views of undergraduate education on the part of Millicent Carey McIntosh, former President of Barnard College, who came on as a member of the first Board of Trustees, and second, the mandate to "make a fresh attack on introducing major fields of learning" without being constrained by the more traditional patterns at Hamilton – a mandate embraced by Kirkland's first and only president, Samuel F. Babbitt. The untimely passing of Hamilton President McEwen, also a member of the first Kirkland Board, deprived Kirkland of its chief champion at Hamilton.

Kirkland was charted by the University of the State of New York in 1965 and opened in 1968 on its own campus, adjacent to Hamilton College. The Kirkland faculty and students operated in a more diverse and transparent community than had been the norm at Hamilton. Students received evaluations rather than grades in their courses. There were no academic departments. Students did not have set "majors"; rather, each student worked out a program of study. In contrast with Hamilton, most Kirkland professors taught their classes in a highly interactive mode, engaging students in a dialogue, without lectures. A key tenet of the college was that students would be actively engaged in running the institution: at Kirkland, the students participated equally in governing the college. Moreover, at Kirkland, a number of professors lived on campus and participated actively in the lives of students. Kirkland was innovative, experimenting with an approach to undergraduate education that was in distinct contrast to that of Hamilton.

Kirkland was defined by its innovative spirit; Hamilton by its fidelity to tradition. Although the new college got off to an exciting start, the many differences in educational and community functioning inevitably led to small and large conflicts between the two institutions. Although President Babbitt and others at Kirkland vigorously disputed this, there was a perception among some at Hamilton that Kirkland was a second-class or less rigorous school. For example, while Hamilton students could register for any Kirkland class, Kirkland students, at first, could not take Hamilton classes without permission from the Hamilton professor teaching the class in question, who would review the student's record. "Many administrators, faculty, and students at Hamilton believed that theirs was the superior institution and dealt with their counterparts at Kirkland as if they were subordinates." Kirkland was perceived by some as favoring "easy" and "feminine" subjects such as performing arts and social sciences, The SAT scores of Kirkland students were lower than those of Hamilton students, although Kirkland students did as well if not better than Hamilton men in the Hamilton courses they took.

Meantime, the economic climate, which had been very positive during the planning stages for Kirkland, began to deteriorate. As a result, the debt service accruing to build Kirkland's entirely new campus exerted a tremendous burden on its finances. Construction costs in one year increased by 10%. Planning a large endowment fundraising effort ("The Campaign for the Second Decade") Kirkland turned to Hamilton for an operating funds guarantee. In 1977, finding that Kirkland was unlikely to become economically self-sufficient, Hamilton refused such assistance, and the two colleges were merged over much student protest into a single, coeducational Hamilton in 1978. The process has been described as a "hostile takeover"; at the end the relationship between the two colleges was "adversarial", the mood on the two campuses at times "near riot". "To say there was anger around campus at that time is to considerably understate the depth of feelings at play."

A study and consideration in the form of an 'intimate history' by Samuel Fisher Babbitt, Kirkland's only president – Limited Engagement: Kirkland College 1965-1978, An Intimate History of the Rise and Fall of a Coordinate College for Women – provides an in-depth, first-person account of Kirkland's brief existence. In addition to personal records and recollection, Babbitt was able to employ archival materials housed in the Hamilton College and Columbia University libraries. He described the merger of Kirkland and Hamilton as "messy."

Despite its dissolution, Kirkland College, through faculty who remained to teach at Hamilton, and through the active influence of its graduates and former trustees, has had a profound influence on Hamilton, which became coeducational, and broadened its offerings, with far less opposition than it would have before Kirkland.

== Legacy at Hamilton College ==
When Kirkland was officially incorporated into and absorbed by Hamilton College in 1978, Hamilton became coed. All Kirkland students were able to continue at the new Hamilton, and most did, but not so faculty. While all Kirkland faculty were offered short-term appointments at Hamilton, Kirkland tenure was not transferred; tenured Kirkland faculty had to pass a tenure review to transfer to Hamilton. Most did, but discontent with the way the merger was executed festered long after 1978, coloring alumnae relations, inter-faculty relations and, to some degree, campus social dynamics. Despite such friction, many of the educational principles of Kirkland (such as student-designed majors and independent study) found their way into the Hamilton curriculum. Efforts on the part of both Kirkland and Hamilton alumni to acknowledge common interests have begun to mend these breaches by responding to the curiosity and interests of current Hamilton students regarding Kirkland and its influence on their college.

The college's art and music departments are located on the Kirkland side of the campus, which has more modern architecture than the original Hamilton.

=== Endowment ===
Upon the dissolution of Kirkland, its endowment was transferred to the Hamilton endowment, with existing restrictions intact, with the understanding that all funds were to be applied "to support women and their needs and interests at Hamilton." One on-going Hamilton program that received early support from the Kirkland Endowment is HAVOC (Hamilton Association for Volunteering, Outreach and Charity).)

=== Memorabilia and traditions ===
The Kirkland Archives, including the papers of President Babbitt, are housed in the Burke Library at Hamilton College. In 2007 a display case, containing a rotating exhibit of items from the Archives, was installed in the lobby of McEwen Hall, near an iconic sculpture, the "rock swing" that dates from Kirkland's early years.

The central motif of the Kirkland College seal was an apple tree, and green apples remain a symbol of Kirkland among its alumnae and supporters to this day. During commencement exercises at Hamilton many students and faculty choose to wear a green apple pin on their academic robes to honor Kirkland's legacy. Many graduating seniors also place green apples on the podium prior to receiving their diplomas.

The Hamilton College Bookstore sells various Kirkland merchandise, typically available on campus during June reunions.

=== The Kirkland Project ===
In the mid-1990s, a group of Hamilton faculty initiated a project with the intention of working "toward establishing a research center like the Bunting Institute at Harvard and the Pembroke Center at Brown."

The Kirkland Project is named in honor of Kirkland College, building on Kirkland's twin legacies of women's education and innovative pedagogy, expanding on them to meet the global challenges that face contemporary male and female students, faculty and staff.

== Notable alumnae and faculty ==
- Christie Vilsack, a member of the Kirkland College charter class of 1972, was the First Lady of Iowa.
- Joanne Rappaport is Professor of Anthropology at Georgetown University.
- Esther Barazzone, a former Kirkland faculty member, was president of Chatham College in Pittsburgh, Pennsylvania.
- Roz Chast, cartoonist for The New Yorker, attended Kirkland College.
- Donna O. Kerner, is chairman of Anthropology at Wheaton College (Massachusetts).
- Children's author Natalie Babbitt taught at Kirkland. She was married to Pres. Samuel F. Babbitt, and wrote her first works while raising their children in Clinton, NY.
- Broadway actress Sandy Faison was a member of the 1972 charter class at Kirkland College.
- Patricia Goldsmith is Vice President of Institutional Advancement at Scripps College.
- M. Ellen Mitchell, class of 1975, is Professor of Psychology and was Director/Dean for 18 years at Illinois Institute of Technology in Chicago
- Helen Barolini writer, editor and translator who taught at Kirkland College.
- Ashton Applewhite, class of 1974, is a writer and anti-ageism activist.

== See also ==
- List of current and historical women's universities and colleges in the United States
- List of defunct colleges and universities in New York

== Further reading (most recent first) ==
- Piccoli, Sydney; Pomerantz, Rebecca (February 2024). "The original light side vs. dark side: the legacy of the Kirkland-Hamilton merger". The Spectator.
- Sundman, John (March 12, 2008). "Kirkland College Requiem". Wet Machine. (Review article of Babbitt's book.).
- Babbitt, Samuel Fisher (2006). Limited Engagement: Kirkland College 1965-1978: An Intimate History of the Rise & Fall of a Coordinate College for Women. XLibris. ISBN 9781425700690.
- Miller-Bernal, Leslie (2004). "Coeducation after a Decade of Coordination. The Case of Hamilton College". In Miller-Bernal, Leslie; Poulson, Susan L. (eds.). Going Coed: Women's Experiences in Formerly Men's Colleges, 1950–2000. Nashville, Tennessee: Vanderbilt University Press. pp. 245–257. ISBN 9780826514493.
- Baker, Liva (May 1978). "Kirkland and Hamilton: Does Father Know Best?". Change. 10 (5): 32–35. doi:10.1080/00091383.1978.10569433. JSTOR 40163484.
