= Grand Rapids Symphony =

American community supported orchestra in Grand Rapids, Michigan

- Orchestra
- Founded: 1930
- Location: 300 Ottawa Ave. NW, Grand Rapids, Michigan
- Concert hall: DeVos Performance Hall
- Music director: Marcelo Lehninger
- Website: www.grsymphony.org

The Grand Rapids Symphony is a professional orchestra located in Grand Rapids, Michigan, USA. Founded in 1930, the symphony celebrated its 90th anniversary season in 2019–20. In 2006, its recording Invention and Alchemy was nominated for Best Classical Crossover Album at the Grammy Awards. The Grand Rapids Symphony presents more than 400 performances throughout Michigan each year, reaching over 200,000 people, and is heard in West Michigan on broadcasts by WBLU-FM (88.9) and WBLV-FM (90.3). The organization also implements 18 educational and access programs that benefit over 80,000 Michigan residents.

Since 2016, the Grand Rapids Symphony's music director has been Marcelo Lehninger.

== History ==
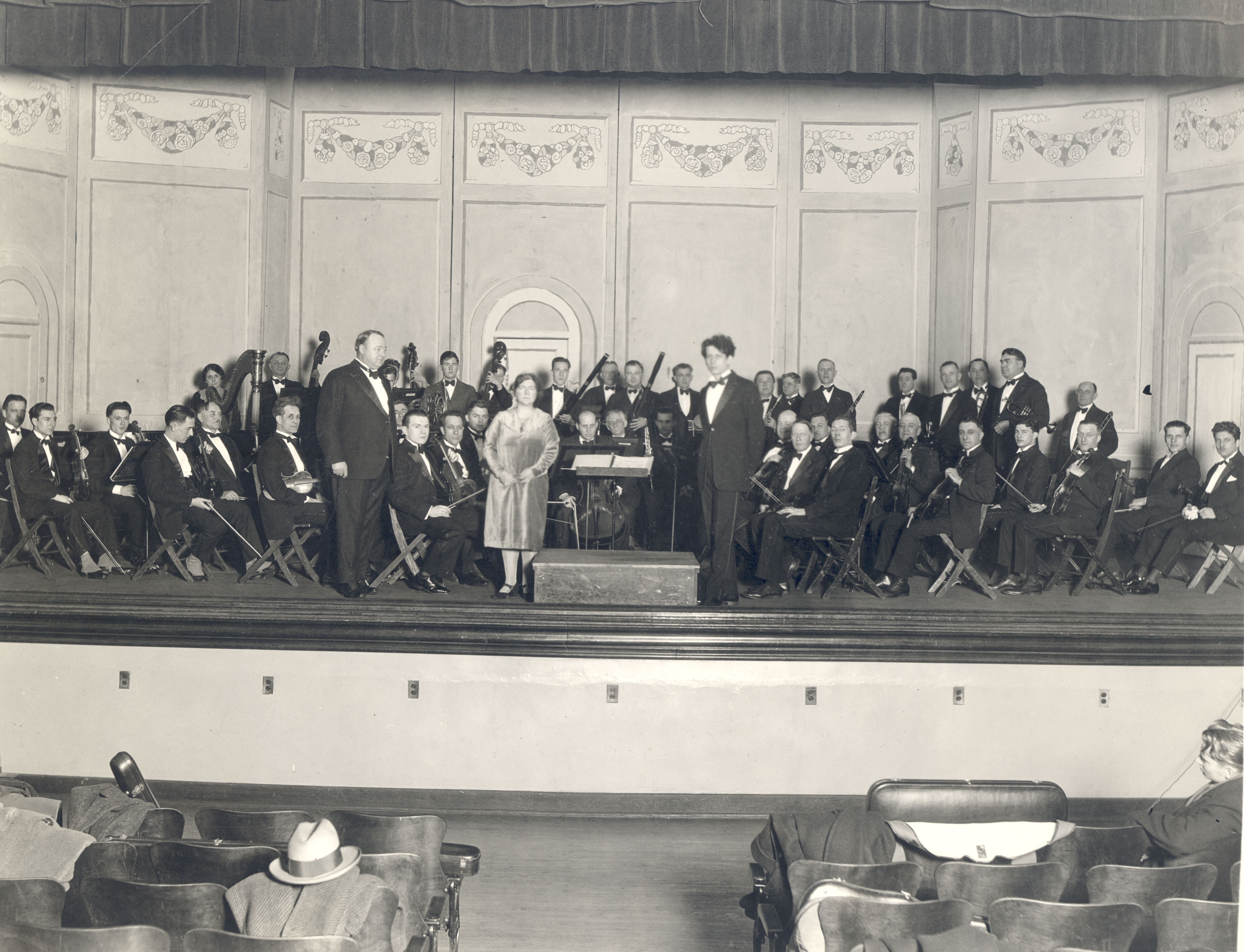
The Grand Rapids Symphony performing at the Majestic Theatre, 1930

In 2000, the orchestra toured northern Lower Michigan and to Michigan's Upper Peninsula with performances at Ferris State University, Interlochen Center for the Arts, Lake Superior State University, Northern Michigan University and Michigan Technological University, where the Grand Rapids Symphony was the premier entertainment for the grand opening of Michigan Tech's $20 million Rozsa Center for Performing Arts, which opened in October 2000. In 2003, the GRS performed in Detroit's Orchestra Hall as part of inaugural activities for the remodeled Max M. Fisher Music Center. The orchestra celebrated its 75th anniversary season by making its debut in New York City's Carnegie Hall on May 21, 2005. The Grand Rapids Symphony was nominated in 2006 for a Grammy Award for Best Classical Crossover Album for its recording, "Invention & Alchemy," featuring harpist and composer Deborah Henson-Conant. "Invention & Alchemy" also was recorded for a DVD, which has aired on PBS-TV in the United States.

In 2013, the GRS joined the ranks of the International Conference of Symphony and Opera Musicians (ICSOM), one of five player conferences within the American Federation of Musicians, representing the largest, professional orchestras in the United States.

The Grand Rapids Symphony's previous music director, David Lockington, stepped down from the post in May 2015 to become music director laureate, the first in the Grand Rapids Symphony's history. Associate conductor is John Varineau, who is in his 35th anniversary season with the Grand Rapids Symphony in 2019-20 as well as in his 32nd season as conductor of the Grand Rapids Youth Symphony. Robert Bernhardt was named principal pops conductor in 2015.

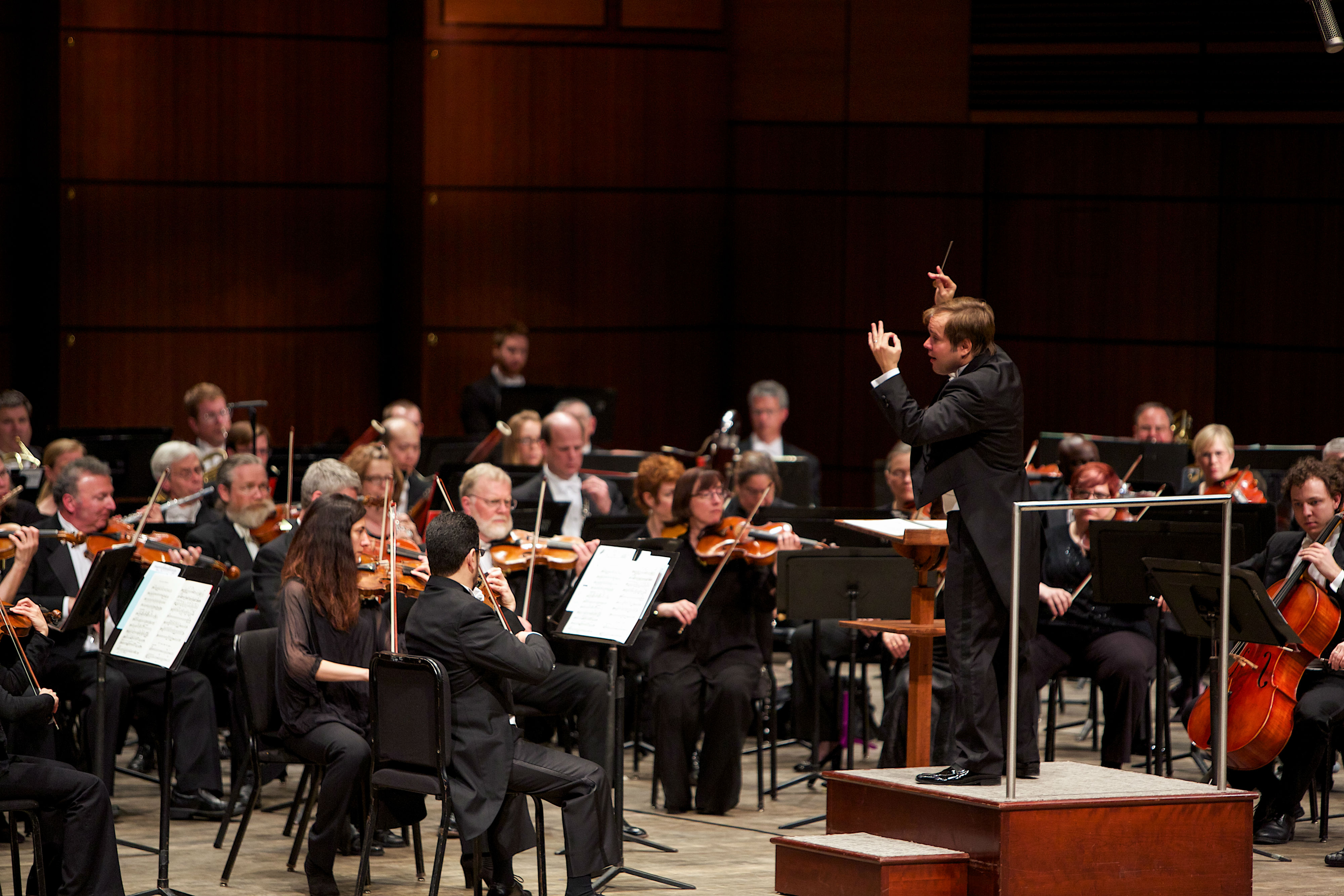
Music Director Marcelo Lehninger conducting the Grand Rapids Symphony in DeVos Performance Hall in 2016

In June 2016, Brazilian-born conductor Marcelo Lehninger was named the 14th music director of the Grand Rapids Symphony. He had formerly served as music director of the New West Symphony in Los Angeles, and associate conductor of the Boston Symphony Orchestra.

The biennial Grand Rapids Bach Festival, which was launched in 1997 and is held in the spring every other year in Grand Rapids, is an official affiliate of the Grand Rapids Symphony. In March 2018, Julian Wachner was appointed artistic director.

In 2018, Lehninger led the Grand Rapids Symphony, joined by the Grand Rapids Symphony Chorus, in the orchestra's second appearance in Carnegie Hall on April 20. Brazilian pianist Nelson Freire, who has performed previously in Carnegie Hall with the Boston Symphony Orchestra and the St. Petersburg Philharmonic, was soloist in music including Brazilian composer Heitor Villa-Lobos' Momoprecoce for piano and orchestra, a work that had been performed only once previously in Carnegie Hall by Eugene Ormandy and the Philadelphia Orchestra in 1959. In 2023 they performed alongside Grammy award winning R&B artist Ne-Yo

== Activities ==
The Grand Rapids Symphony also collaborates with Opera Grand Rapids and with Grand Rapids Ballet in live performances.

Musical organizations that are part of the larger Grand Rapids Symphony include the Grand Rapids Youth Symphony and Classical Orchestra, both led by John Varineau; the Grand Rapids Symphony Chorus, a 140-voice, adult, volunteer chorus directed by Pearl Shangkuan; and the Grand Rapids Symphony Youth Chorus, co-directed by Sean and Leah Ivory.

The Grand Rapids Symphony collaborates with its local community to bridge cultures with an annual concert titled “Symphony with Soul” featuring national and local African-American guest artists. A percentage of the proceeds from this event supports the Grand Rapids Symphony's Mosaic Scholarship Fund” created in 2005 through a grant from the W.K. Kellogg Foundation. The scholarship fund provides musical instruments and music lessons for young African-American and Latino students in the Grand Rapids area.

== Concert Series ==
The Grand Rapids Symphony presents eight concert series annually during the fall and winter from September through May, and one concert series in the summer in July and August.

- Richard and Helen DeVos Classical - 10 concerts held on Friday and Saturday evenings in DeVos Performance Hall in Grand Rapids.
- Fox Motors Pops - Six sets of concerts held on Friday and Saturday evenings and Sunday afternoons in DeVos Performance Hall in Grand Rapids.
- Gerber SymphonicBoom - Three programs held in DeVos Performance Hall on varying days and times. Some programs are one-night only, others repeat.
- Holland Home Great Eras - Four evening concerts per season, each devoted to music of a single musical era, including the Baroque, Classical, Romantic, and 20th and 21st Century eras, held in historic St. Cecilia Music Center in Grand Rapids.
- Porter Hills Coffee Classics - Three morning concerts, each a one-hour version of the Crowe Horwath Great Eras series, held in St. Cecilia Music Center in Grand Rapids.
- Sacred Dimensions - Three programs held in area churches or colleges and universities in West Michigan. Most are performance only, others repeat.
- DTE Energy Foundation Family - Two programs especially for school-age children and their families, usually held Sunday afternoons in DeVos Performance Hall.
- PNC Lollipops - Three 45-minute-long programs especially for preschool-age children and their families, usually held Saturday mornings in Sunshine Community Church in Grand Rapids.
- D&W Fresh Market Picnic Pops - Four weeks of outdoor summer concerts held at Cannonsburg Ski Area. Most concerts are held Thursdays and repeat on Fridays. Others are one-night only special events held on varying days.

== Music Directors ==
1930–1940	Karl Wecker
1940–1942	Thor Johnson
1942–1946	Nicolai Malko
1946–1948	Rudolph Ganz
1948–1954	José Echániz
1954–1958	Désiré Defauw
1959–1964	Robert Zeller
1964–1968	Carl Karapetian
1968–1973	Gregory Millar
1973–1979	Theo Alcántara
1980–1985	Semyon Bychkov
1986–1997	Catherine Comet
1999–2015	David Lockington
2016-	Marcelo Lehninger

== Discography ==
- 1993 David Ott Symphony No. 2 and Symphony No. 3, Catherine Comet, conductor
- 1995 Donald Erb,” Three Concertos, featuring Richard Stoltzman, clarinet; Miriam Fried, violin; and Ava Ordman, trombone; Catherine Comet, conductor
- 1995 Happy Holidays with the Grand Rapids Symphony, John Varineau, conductor
- 1996 Grand Rapids Symphony Piano Pops with Rich Ridenour; John Varineau, conductor
- 1997 Saint-Saëns Symphony No. 1 and Symphony No. 2, Catherine Comet, conductor
- 1999 Grand Rapids Symphony Piano Pops II with Rich Ridenour; John Varineau, conductor
- 2000 Aaron Copland, American Images, David Lockington, conductor
- 2005 Live from Carnegie Hall! David Lockington, conductor
- 2006 Invention and Alchemy, David Lockington, conductor
- 2007 Adolphus Hailstork, Symphony No. 2 and No. Symphony 3
- 2008 "One of Us, Portrait of a Humble Healer" John Varineau, conductor
- 2010 "Phillip Sawyers" The Gale of Life, Symphonic Music for Strings & Brass, and Symphony No. 1
