= James Freeman (conductor) =

James Freeman (born 1939) is Professor Emeritus of Music at Swarthmore College in Swarthmore, PA. He is also the artistic director and conductor of Philadelphia's renowned contemporary music chamber orchestra and ensemble, Orchestra 2001, which he founded in 1988. He was trained at Harvard University (B.A., M.A., Ph.D), Tanglewood, and Vienna's Akademie für Musik. He counts among his principal teachers pianists Artur Balsam and Paul Badura-Skoda and his father, double bassist Henry Freeman.

As a conductor, he has commissioned and given the first performances of many new works by American composers. In 1990 he was given the first Philadelphia Music Foundation's award for achievement in Classical Music. Other honors include two Fulbright Fellowships, grants from the National Endowment for the Humanities, the National Endowment for the Arts, Swarthmore College, the German Government, and Harvard University's Paine Traveling Fellowship. He spent the spring of 1991 at the Moscow Conservatory as a guest conductor and lecturer on new American music."
