= John Varineau =

American musician

John Patrick Varineau is Associate Conductor of the Grand Rapids Symphony as well as the director of the Grand Rapids Youth Symphony, an affiliate of the Grand Rapids Symphony, in Grand Rapids, Michigan. Appointed Assistant Conductor in June 1985 prior to the start of the Grand Rapids Symphony's 1985–86 season, he was promoted to Associate Conductor in May 1986. In August 1988, Varineau was named director of the Grand Rapids Youth Symphony. He retired from the Grand Rapids Symphony at the end of the 2020–21 season, his 36th season on staff with the Grand Rapids Symphony and his 33rd season with the Grand Rapids Youth Symphony.

He has a bachelor's degree in music from the University of Wyoming, and a master's degree in music from Yale University. A clarinetist as well as a conductor, Varineau has held adjunct teaching positions at Cornerstone University, Grand Valley State University, and Grand Rapids Community College. From 2013 until 2015, Varineau held a full-time position on the music faculty of Calvin University, then Calvin College, conducting the Calvin Orchestra and the Calvin Community Symphony. In 2015, Varineau became an adjunct professor at Calvin University, continuing to teach and conduct the Calvin Orchestra and Community Symphony, and has now retired fully from Calvin University except for as a private clarinet lesson instructor.
