= Long Island Philharmonic =

Former orchestra in Melville, New York

The Long Island Philharmonic, based in Melville, New York was founded in 1979 by folk singer Harry Chapin, Maestro Christopher Keene, and a group of Long Island's community and business leaders. On February 8, 2016, an announcement was made that the group would permanently disband effective immediately.

== History ==
=== Founding ===
Harry Chapin moved to Long Island in 1972, and almost at once began using his celebrity status to improve his new hometown. "He thought Long Island represented a remarkable opportunity," said Chapin's widow, Sandy. At his encouragement, a group of Long Island business leaders agreed to fund the formation of the orchestra, under the musical directorship of Maestro Keene, with Chapin serving as chairman of the board of directors. The LIP's premiere concert occurred on the weekend of November 16, 17, and 18, 1979. From its founding, the orchestra recruited some of the finest musicians in the New York metropolitan area, and also supported a full chorus of dedicated amateur singers.

=== The Keene years ===
Maestro Keene was a proponent of new works, and brought in soloists of international reputation. Under his direction, the philharmonic commissioned and premiered several works, including Jay Reise's Symphony No. 3 “Awakening to Memory”.

=== The Alsop years ===
After Maestro Keene's departure, a nationwide search was conducted to find his replacement. Marin Alsop was selected based on having recently won both the Stokowski Conducting Competition and the Koussevitzky Conducting Prize. The philharmonic hoped that her youth and exuberance would rejuvenate the orchestra. Under her baton, the orchestra thrived financially and musically.

=== Recent history ===
In 2004, celebrating its 25th anniversary, the orchestra nearly disappeared altogether. The final two concerts of the 2003/2004 concert series had to be canceled due to funding shortages. Governmental support has been provided by Sen. Hillary Clinton and State Senator Carl Marcellino, having delivered grants at both the federal and state level. UBS made a generous 5-year challenge grant of $250,000, which was matched by individual donors such as Charles Dolan, David Lerner, Marvin Sussman, and Billy Joel.

The Long Island Philharmonic maintained an extensive Arts in Education program, entitled "Music LIvz". Among the programs the philharmonic offered were Youth Concerts, In-school performances, Master Classes, the Young Artist Competition, and Orchestra at Work.

Beginning in 2011, the group stopped performing their regular subscription series, performing only their New Years Gala, educational programs and summer parks concerts. On February 8, 2016, an announcement was made that the group would permanently disband effective immediately. The failure of the organization has been ascribed to several factors, including the mergers and acquisitions of several of the banks that formed the bulk of its funding base, as well as the changing economy of Long Island and the proximity of New York City's better known arts organizations that attracted donor funds away from Long Island. Select musicians from the philharmonic will continue to run school programs.

== Community acceptance ==
Despite its mission to offer the residents of Long Island's Nassau and Suffolk Counties a world-class performing arts organization, the philharmonic suffered due to the region's proximity to the cultural attractions and institutions of New York City. Additionally, Long Island's expansive geography posed a problem for the orchestra. Because of the distances between Long Island's more rural East End locales and its more populous western suburban neighborhoods, the Long Island Philharmonic would routinely perform duplicate concert programs across two or three venues, most notably the 2242-seat Tilles Center for the Performing Arts at the CW Post Campus of Long Island University in Nassau County, and the Staller Center for the Arts at Stony Brook University, State University of New York in central Suffolk County. It was during the 1990-91 season (under director Marin Alsop) that the orchestra first established a presence in [western] Suffolk County at the 2200-seat Eugene Orloff Auditorium at Half Hollow Hills High School East in Dix Hills - and building upon the high attendance achieved at that venue, the following season it would find a permanent residency further east at the Staller Center in Stony Brook.

== Long Island Philharmonic Chorus ==
From its beginning, the Long Island Philharmonic incorporated a choral element. At the time of its founding in 1979, Maestro Keene asked Frances Roberts, a local music teacher and accomplished vocal accompanist, to form a chorus. From that beginning, the Chorus was a regular part of the Long Island Philharmonic.

The chorus consisted of 100 – 150 amateur singers drawn from all walks of life. Many were musical professionals: music teachers, voice teachers and others, while many others are strictly amateurs. Despite this mix, the chorus regularly received critical acclaim.

The orchestra generally scheduled at least one choral piece each year in its repertory.

== Legacy ==
Maestro Keene was the music director of the New York City Opera during this time and during his tenure became the general director of the NY City Opera. Maestra Alsop has gone on to become one of the premiere female conductors in the world, leading both the Bournemouth Symphony and, most recently, the Baltimore Symphony Orchestra, thus becoming the first female full-time conductor of a major US orchestra.

== List of conductors / music directors ==
- Christopher Keene, founding director, 1979–1989
- Marin Alsop, 1990–1995
- David Lockington, 1996–2000
- David Wiley, 2001–2016

== Awards and honors ==
- Recognized by New York State as a Primary Arts Organization
- The Long Island Philharmonic was inducted into the Long Island Music Hall of Fame on October 15, 2006.
