= New West Symphony =

- Orchestra
- Founded: 1995
- Principal conductor: Michael Christie
- Website: www.newwestsymphony.org

The New West Symphony is a regional professional symphony orchestra serving the Los Angeles metropolitan area. It was founded in 1995. The orchestra's players are professional musicians drawn from the rich pool of classical musicians in the Los Angeles region, many of whom work as session players for film, television and audio recording in the entertainment industry, and play for other area orchestras as well. The New West Symphony is a 501c3 charity governed by a 30-member board of directors.

The orchestra is the resident company of 2 concert halls: the 1,500-seat Oxnard Performing Arts Center, and the 1,800-seat Kavli Theatre at the Antoine Predock-designed Thousand Oaks Civic Arts Plaza in Thousand Oaks. The organization offers six of classical programs annually with multiple concerts, with international guest artists usually featured soloists, as well as New West principal players upon occasion. The organization has a core audience of over 2,500 subscribers.

== History ==
The symphony was founded in 1995 as the successor to two orchestras that ceased operations, the Ventura County Symphony and the Conejo Symphony Orchestra. Its founding music director was Boris Brott, whose programming emphasized the 19th and 20th century symphonic repertoire. The organization went through a financial crisis around 2008, and musicians took pay cuts to help the New West to survive. In May 2012, the orchestra announced the appointment of Marcelo Lehninger, who had conducted the orchestra in January 2011 as an emergency substitution and then again in scheduled appearances in April 2012. Lehninger became music director on September 30, 2012. Lehninger performed for 3 seasons and left in 2016. In December, 2018 New West Symphony appointed new music director, GRAMMY(r) Award winner Michael Christie as its music director.

The orchestra has served as the touring orchestra for Andrea Bocelli, completing its third such tour in 2010.

== Educational programs ==
- The Symphonic Adventures program provides an introduction to symphonic music in the concert hall for elementary school children, combined with classroom curriculum that prepares the children for the concert hall performance.
- The New West Symphony Music Van—sometimes called a “musical petting zoo”—maintains a year-round schedule touring the region visiting elementary schools and festivals. The Music Van provides hands-on experiences with orchestral instruments for thousands of children.
- The Laby Harmony Project of the New West Symphony - offers tuition-free music education and instruments to underserved students in Ventura, and currently supports 160 students.

== Community outreach ==
- Meet the Artist provides opportunities for the community to get acquainted with distinguished guest artists performing in the Masterpiece Series programs in an intimate one-on-one format.
- Hear & Now Live are the New West's version of the venerable pre-concert lecture, given by David Ravetch in the concert hall immediately preceding the performances.

== Auxiliaries ==
The New West Symphony League is an auxiliary organization affiliated with the New West Symphony Association and chartered to raise funds that support the symphony's programs.
