= Catherine Comet =

French-born, American conductor

Catherine Comet (born 1944) is a French-born, American conductor who, from 1986 to 1997, was the music director of the Grand Rapids Symphony in Grand Rapids, Michigan, becoming the first woman to hold a post as music director of a professional orchestra in the United States.

== Formative years ==
Comet was born in Fontainebleu, France in 1944. Her mother took her to hear her first symphony concert when she was five years old. She subsequently began studying the piano with a pianist who lived in her neighborhood. Throughout these formative years, she was home schooled by her mother, who used curriculum materials that were approved for home instruction by the French government. This enabled Comet to focus more intensely on her musical training during her youth, which ultimately prepared her for admission to the Paris Conservatory. Nadia Boulanger became one of her mentors.

== Conducting career ==
From 1984 to 1986, Comet was associate conductor of the Baltimore Symphony Orchestra.

During her eleven-year tenure with the Grand Rapids Symphony, from 1986 to 1987, Comet also served as music director of the American Symphony Orchestra.

Following her tenure in Grand Rapids, she served as a guest conductor for numerous other orchestras, including the Quad Cities Symphony in Davenport, Iowa in 2004.

== Awards ==
Comet received the Seaver/National Endowment for the Arts Conductors Award in 1988.
