= Academica Press =

Scholarly research publisher

- Distribution: Ingram Content Group (Americas); Mare Nostrum (UK, Europe, Asia/Pacific); Gardners (UK)
- Publication types: Books, Journals
- Fiction genres: Non-Fiction
- Imprints: St. James's Studies in World Affairs, Maunsel, W. B. Sheridan Law Books, Bethesda Scientific
- Official website: www.academicapress.com

Academica Press is a scholarly and trade publisher of non-fiction, particularly research in the social sciences, humanities, education, law, public policy, international relations, and other disciplines. Long managed by the late Robert Redfern-West, it is now operated by a privately owned limited liability corporation and internationally focused. Its President and CEO is the historian and critic Paul du Quenoy. In addition to its main list of publications, Academica publishes several imprints in subject areas of special interest, including St. James's Studies in World Affairs, W. B. Sheridan Law Books, Bethesda Scientific, and an Irish studies series under the imprint of Maunsel, the original publisher of James Joyce and William Butler Yeats.

== Recent Academica authors include ==
- James Allan, Australian legal scholar, Garrick Professor of Law at the University of Queensland
- Robert Ayres, American physicist, economist, and Shakespeare scholar; INSEAD professor
- Julie Burchill, British journalist and writer
- James Flynn, American-New Zealand professor of political studies, intelligence researcher, and namesake of the "Flynn effect"
- Jack Foley, American poet
- William Franke, American philosopher and educator
- Seymour Itzkoff, American psychologist
- Neil Kent, Historian
- Gino Lupini, Historian, educator and ex-international rugby player
- George Maior, Romanian diplomat and former chief of Romania's national intelligence service
- Peter Martins, Danish-American ballet dancer and choreographer, former Balletmaster of New York City Ballet
- Jeffrey S. Morton, political scientist and international law specialist
- Andrew Napolitano, American judge, legal analyst, and columnist
- Francis Martin O'Donnell, Irish, United Nations, and Sovereign Military Order of Malta diplomat and heraldist
- John O'Sullivan, British journalist and commentator, former editor of National Review
- Martin Palouš, Ambassador of the Czech Republic to the United States and United Nations, leading anti-communist dissident, and Senior Fellow at Florida International University
- Irina Papkova, international relations and religion scholar
- Juliana Geran Pilon, political philosopher and Senior Fellow of the Alexander Hamilton Institute for the Study of Western Civilization
- Aaron Rhodes, international human rights scholar and activist
- Marion Smith, President of the Common Sense Society
- J. E. R. Staddon, behavioral psychologist
- George Szamuely, British political scientist
- Corey Evan Thompson, Herman Melville scholar and critic
- Count Nikolai Tolstoy, Anglo-Russian historian
- Giuseppe Valditara, Minister of Education of Italy
- Jere van Dyk, American journalist
- Elizabeth Weiss, American anthropologist
- Akhmed Zakayev, Prime Minister of Chechnya's government-in-exile, military commander, and independence leader in Chechnya's wars against Russia
