= Irina Papkova =

American political scientist

Irina Andreyevna Papkova (Russian: Ирина Андреевна Папкова, now Irina du Quenoy), is a scholar of religion and international relations, currently a Research Fellow of Georgetown University's Berkley Center for Religion, Peace, and World Affairs and Vice President and Associate Director of the Synodal School of Liturgical Music.

A magna cum laude graduate of Hamilton College, Papkova received M.A. and Ph.D. degrees from Georgetown University. She has taught there, at George Washington University, and at Central European University. She has also held academic fellowships at the Kennan Institute for Advanced Russian Studies in Washington, the Institut für die Wissenschaften vom Menschen in Vienna, and the Slavic-Eurasian Research Center at Hokkaido University in Japan. Papkova is the author of The Orthodox Church in Russian Politics (Oxford University Press, 2011), a critically acclaimed study of state-church relations in post-Soviet Russia, and numerous scholarly articles in academic journals. She has been a regular contributor to The Revealer, a gazette of religion and international affairs issues, and is actively involved in the world of Russian Orthodox Church music.

Papkova is a daughter of the Very Reverend André Papkov, a Russian Orthodox Archpriest and retired rector of Chicago's Cathedral of the Holy Protection. She is a great-great-granddaughter of the Russian-German industrialist, politician, philanthropist, and anti-communist leader Nikolay Fyodorovitch von Ditmar and fifth-generation grandniece of Count Friedrich Wilhelm von Buxhoeveden, a Baltic German general in Russian service who initially commanded the Russian armies in the Finnish War of 1808-1809. Another ancestor was the Russian jurist and politician Fyodor Alexandrovich Golovin, a founder of the Constitutional Democratic Party and chairman of the short-lived second convocation of the Imperial Russian Duma. She is a cousin of the Russian-born German stage and screen actress Marina von Ditmar.

She is married to the historian, critic, investor, and philanthropist Paul du Quenoy. Under her married name, she is chairwoman of the Russian Ball of Washington, DC.
