= David Aldrich Nelson =

American judge (1932–2010)

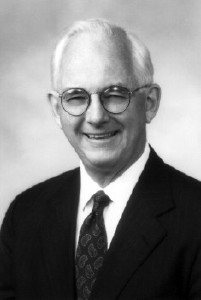

Senior Judge of the United States Court of Appeals for the Sixth Circuit
- In office October 1, 1999 – October 1, 2010

Judge of the United States Court of Appeals for the Sixth Circuit
- In office October 17, 1985 – October 1, 1999
- Appointed by: Ronald Reagan
- Preceded by: Seat established by 98 Stat. 333
- Succeeded by: Jeffrey Sutton

Personal details
- Born: David Aldrich Nelson; August 14, 1932 Watertown, New York, U.S.
- Died: October 1, 2010 (aged 78) Indian Hill, Ohio, U.S.
- Education: Hamilton College (AB); Harvard Law School (LLB)

David Aldrich Nelson (August 14, 1932 – October 1, 2010) was a United States circuit judge of the United States Court of Appeals for the Sixth Circuit.

== Early life ==
Born in Watertown, New York to son of Carlton Low Nelson and Irene Demetria Aldrich Nelson, Nelson was educated in the public schools of East Aurora, New York, and at Hamilton College, from which he was graduated in 1954 as valedictorian, with an Artium Baccalaureus degree. Nelson began his legal studies that year as a Fulbright Scholar at the University of Cambridge in England. En route to England, he met Mary Dickson, a recent Vassar College graduate who also was a Cambridge-bound Fulbright Scholar. The couple became engaged in England; they were married for fifty-four years and had three children. Nelson took first class honours at Cambridge in 1955, on the strength of which he was retrospectively made a scholar of his college, Peterhouse.

== Education and military service ==
Nelson received his Bachelor of Laws from Harvard Law School, cum laude, in 1958. Admitted to the bar in that year, he began the practice of law in Cleveland, Ohio with the firm of Squire, Sanders & Dempsey. From 1959 to 1962 he served on active duty with the United States Air Force at the Pentagon as a U.S. Air Force Lieutenant Attorney-advisor, Office of General Counsel. He remained in the Air Force Reserve for several years thereafter, attaining the rank of major.

== Later career ==
Admitted to partnership in Squire, Sanders & Dempsey in 1967, Nelson resigned in 1969 to accept appointment by President Richard Nixon as General Counsel of the Post Office Department. Postmaster General Winton M. Blount awarded Nelson the Department's Benjamin Franklin award for his work on what became the Postal Reorganization Act of 1970. After the enactment of that legislation, Nelson became Senior Assistant Postmaster General and General Counsel of the newly established United States Postal Service. Nelson rejoined his former law firm in 1972.

== Federal judicial service ==
On September 9, 1985, President Ronald Reagan nominated Nelson to a new seat on the United States Court of Appeals for the Sixth Circuit created by 98 Stat. 333. He was confirmed by the United States Senate on October 16, 1985, and received his commission on October 17, 1985. As a United States Circuit Judge, Nelson served two terms on the Criminal Law Committee of the Judicial Conference of the United States. He assumed senior status on October 1, 1999; because of his gradually deteriorating health, he closed his courthouse chambers in 2006.

== Other service ==
Nelson was a member of Phi Beta Kappa, a Fellow of the American College of Trial Lawyers, a Life Fellow of the Ohio State Bar Foundation, and a Sergeant Emeritus of the Court of Nisi Prius in Cleveland. He served as a member of the National Council of the Ohio State University Moritz College of Law, a trustee of Hamilton College, and a director of Blount, Inc.. He was a director of the Alexander Hamilton Institute for the Study of Western Civilization, based in Clinton, New York, which sponsors an annual lecture on constitutional law in his honor. In 2011, his son, Caleb Nelson, a Professor of Law at the University of Virginia, delivered the lecture.

== Sources ==
- Segall, Grant (October 7, 2010). "U.S. Appeals Judge David Aldrich Nelson started his legal career in Cleveland". The Plain Dealer (Cleveland).

Legal offices
Preceded by Seat established by 98 Stat. 333	Judge of the United States Court of Appeals for the Sixth Circuit; 1985–1999	Succeeded by Jeffrey Sutton
