= Robert L. Paquette =

American historian (born 1951)

- Occupation: Historian

Robert Louis Paquette (born 1951) is an American historian and former Professor of American History at Hamilton College, and co-founder of the Alexander Hamilton Institute for the Study of Western Civilization. He is particularly known for his work on the history of slavery in Cuba.

== Life and work ==
Paquette obtained his BA cum laude in 1973 from the Bowling Green State University, and his PhD with honors in 1982 from the University of Rochester. His adviser was the eminent historian of slavery and antebellum Southern society, Eugene Genovese.

In 1994 he was appointed Publius Virgilius Rogers Professor of American History at Hamilton College. During his career, he has been an outspoken critic of liberal politics on Hamilton's campus. In 2002, Paquette protested when a student group invited Annie Sprinkle, an actress and former porn-star, to speak on campus. Paquette later led an attempt to create an alumni-endowed center on campus dedicated to "the study of capitalism, natural law and the role of religion in politics," but the initiative was ultimately rejected by the faculty and administration. In response, Paquette co-founded the independent Alexander Hamilton Institute for the Study of Western Civilization, housed off-campus in the nearby village of Clinton. In response to the College's handling of the Institute issue and other matters, Paquette formally resigned his endowed professorship (though not his faculty position) in 2011. Paquette left Hamilton College in 2018.

In 2005 Paquette was awarded the Mary Young Award for distinguished achievement by the University of Rochester.

== Selected publications ==
- Paquette, Robert L., Sugar is made with blood: the conspiracy of La Escalera and the conflict between empires over slavery in Cuba. Middletown, CT: Wesleyan University Press, 1988.
- Paquette, Robert L., and Stanley L. Engerman, eds. The Lesser Antilles in the age of European expansion. University Press of Florida, 1996.
- Engerman, Stanley L., Seymour Drescher, and Robert L. Paquette, eds. Slavery. Oxford University Press, 2001.

Articles, a selection:

- Paquette, Robert L. "Social history update: slave resistance and social history." Journal of Social History (1991): 681–685.
- Paquette, Robert L. "Revolutionary Saint Domingue in the making of territorial Louisiana." A Turbulent Time: The French Revolution and the Greater Caribbean (1997): 204–25.
