= Juliana Geran Pilon =

American academic

Juliana Geran Pilon is a Romanian-born naturalized American writer. She is currently a senior fellow at the Alexander Hamilton Institute for the Study of Western Civilization in Clinton, New York. She previously was professor of politics and culture and director of the Center for Culture and Security at The Institute of World Politics.

== Personal life and education ==
Born in Romania, Pilon emigrated with her family to the United States as a teenager. She attended the University of Chicago under a scholarship and graduated with a B.A. in philosophy in 1969. She attended Princeton University for a year between 1969 and 1970, where she studied history and philosophy, but returned to the University of Chicago where she earned an M.A. in philosophy in 1971 and a Ph.D. in philosophy in 1974. She is married to Roger Pilon, Vice President of Legal Affairs at the Cato Institute.

== Career ==
Pilon served as an assistant professor in the department of philosophy at Emory University in Atlanta from 1977 to 1979. In 1979, she relocated to Stanford University, where she was a visiting scholar at the Hoover Institution. The following year, she held a fellowship at the Institute for Humane Studies in Menlo Park, California. From 1981 to 1988, Pilon was a Senior Policy Analyst at The Heritage Foundation in Washington, D.C. From 1992 to 2002, she joined the International Foundation for Election Systems, serving as director of programs for Europe and Asia, then vice president for programs, and as senior advisor for civil society. In August 2002, she became associate director of the Center for Democracy and Election Management at American University, serving in that capacity until February 2003.

Pilon was an adjunct professor at Johns Hopkins University, American University, and George Washington University, a visiting professor at St. Mary's College of Maryland, and an adjunct professor at Rochester Institute of Technology, as well as the National Defense University. She once served as adjunct research professor and Earhart Fellow at the Institute of World Politics. She is currently a senior fellow at the Alexander Hamilton Institute for the Study of Western Civilization and a member of the International Editorial and Advisory Board of the Israel Council on Foreign Relations.

== Publications ==
She has written several books and monographs, according to her résumé, and over two hundred fifty published articles and reviews for The Wall Street Journal, The American Spectator, National Review, The National Interest, Humanitas, and other publications.

Books

- Pilon, Juliana Geran (2019). The Utopian Conceit and the War on Freedom. Academica Press. ISBN 978-1680531664.
- The Art of Peace: Engaging a Complex World. Routledge. 2016.
- Notes from the other side of night. Introduction by Mircea Eliade. Routledge. 2013. ISBN 9781412852609.
- Soulmates: Resurrecting Eve. Transaction Publishers. 2011. ISBN 978-1-4128-4249-5.
- Why America Is Such a Hard Sell: Beyond Pride and Prejudice. Rowman & Littlefield. 2007. ISBN 978-0-7425-5149-7.
- The Bloody Flag: Post-Communist Nationalism in Eastern Europe: Spotlight on Romania. Transaction Publishers. 1992. ISBN 978-1-56000-620-6.
- Every Vote Counts: The Role of Elections in Building Democracy. IFES democracy collection. With Richard W. Soudriette. University Press of America. 2007. ISBN 978-0761836766.
- Cultural Intelligence for Winning the Peace. Institute of World Politics Press. 2009. ISBN 978-0-615-51939-5.
- The UN: assessing Soviet abuses. With Ralph Kinney Bennett. Alliance Publishers for the Institute for European Defence & Strategic Studies. 1988. ISBN 978-0-907967-90-3.

Articles

- "2020 America and the Cancel Culture of Fools," Israel Journal of Foreign Affairs, XIV:2 (2020).
- "Will Covenantal Liberal Nationalism Survive? Israel and America under Threat," Israel Journal of Foreign Affairs, XVII:3 (2023).
