= The Divine Jetta =

1937 film

- Directed by: Erich Waschneck
- Written by: Rolf Meyer; Kurt E. Walter
- Produced by: Erich Waschneck
- Starring: Grethe Weiser; Viktor de Kowa; Marina von Ditmar
- Cinematography: Friedl Behn-Grund
- Edited by: Walter Fredersdorf
- Music by: Georg Haentzschel
- Production company: Fanal-Filmproduktion
- Distributed by: Europa-Filmverleih
- Release date: 18 March 1937
- Running time: 97 minutes
- Country: Germany
- Language: German

The Divine Jetta (German: Die göttliche Jette) is a 1937 German musical comedy film directed by Erich Waschneck and starring Grethe Weiser, Viktor de Kowa, and Marina von Ditmar.

== Cast ==
- Grethe Weiser as Jette Schönborn
- Viktor de Kowa as Fritz Barsch
- Marina von Ditmar as Paula Schönborn
- Kurt Meisel as Graf Eugen Opalla
- Eva Tinschmann as Wilhelmine Schönborn
- Wilhelm P. Krüger as Amor-Director
- Ernst Waldow as August, ihr Sohn
- Elsa Wagner as Die Kunkeln, Garderobiere
- Oscar Sabo as Fliederbusch, Theateragent
- Paul Westermeier as Arthur Körting, Bankdirektor
- Hans Junkermann as Direktor des 'Königstädtischen Theaters'
- Jakob Tiedtke as Kommerzienrat
- Otti Dietze as Alte Dame
- Annemarie Steinsieck as Frau Körting
- Olga Limburg as seine Frau
- Ernst Legal as Professor Cravallo
- Rudolf Klein-Rogge as Stadtrat Müller
- Wilhelm Bendow as Liebreich, ein alter Mime
- Hansi Arnstaedt as Frau des Kommerziensrats
- Alfred Schlageter as Der alte Graf Opalla
- Antonie Jaeckel as Hausdame bei Graf Opalla
- Gerhard Dammann as Policeman
- Erich Dunskus as Policeman
- Wilhelm Egger-Sell as Portier
- Eva Genschow
- Jutta Jol
- Paul Rehkopf as Policeman
- Arthur Reinhardt
- Willi Rose
- Rudolf Vones
- Käthe Jöken-König
- Hella Thornegg
- Werner Bernhardy
- Erny Berty
- Georgi Georg
- Kurt Getke
- Harry Gillmann
- Paul Hildebrandt as Policeman
- Arthur Kühn
- Georg Paulsen
- Paul Schäfer
- Betty Waid as Eine alte Frau an der Amor-Theaterkasse
- Borwin Walth as Servant

== Bibliography ==
- Bock, Hans-Michael; Bergfelder, Tim, eds. (2009). The Concise Cinegraph: Encyclopaedia of German Cinema. New York: Berghahn Books. ISBN 978-1-57181-655-9.
