= Marina von Ditmar =

German actress (1914-2014)

- Born: 30 October 1914; Saint Petersburg, Russian Empire (present-day Russia)
- Died: 3 September 2014 (aged 99); Bad Kissingen, Bavaria, Germany
- Occupation: Actress
- Years active: 1934–1951 (film)

Marina von Ditmar (Russian: Марина фон Дитмар; 30 October 1914 – 3 September 2014) was a Russian-born German actress.

== Life and career ==
Ditmar was born in Saint Petersburg in 1914, into a noble Baltic German family whose members included explorer Karl von Ditmar and politician Nikolay Fyodorovitch von Ditmar. Her family emigrated to Germany following the Russian Civil War.

She studied acting under Lucie Höflich and Ilka Grüning. Her first roles were performed at the Schauspielhaus, Bremen, and the Altes Theater (Leipzig). In 1937, she started with the ensemble at the Volksbühne, Berlin. By 1940 she was a permanent actress at this theatre. Her first big movie success came in the operetta The Csardas Princess in 1934, alongside Hans Söhnker. In 1943, she starred with Hans Albers in Münchhausen with great commercial and critical success. During the Third Reich she was cast in several Nazi propaganda films, such as Legion Condor (1939) with Paul Hartmann, and Stukas (1941) as a French girl alongside Carl Raddatz.

== Personal life ==
In 1949, she married Dr. Hans-Georg Dehnhardt (1913–2001) and after having starred in about 24 movies she retired from acting to the couple's home in Bad Kissingen, Bavaria.

Thanks to personal contacts in politics, the aristocracy and the world of film and theatre, the couple was able to receive many prominent guests in their private sanatorium in Bad Kissingen in the following decades - such as, for example, the Thai royal couple Bhumibol Adulyadej and Sirikit during the visit of the German President Heinrich Lübke and his wife Wilhelmine in 1960; Lübke was taking the cure at Dehnhardt's sanatorium at the time. "The connection with Mario Adorf was particularly close, and Uschi Glas was also among the family's friends."

=== Death ===
She died at age 99, in Bad Kissingen, where she is buried in the Parkfriedhof.

== Selected filmography ==
- The Csardas Princess (1934)
- City of Anatol (1936)
- Love Can Lie (1937)
- The Divine Jetta (1937)
- A Prussian Love Story (1938)
- Legion Condor (1939)
- Above All Else in the World (1941)
- The Red Terror (1942)
- With the Eyes of a Woman (1942)
- Münchhausen (1943)
- When the Young Wine Blossoms (1943)
- Come Back to Me (1944)
- The Appeal to Conscience (1949)
- Crown Jewels (1950)

== Bibliography ==
- Richards, Jeffrey. Visions of Yesterday. Routledge, 2014.
