= Roger Pilon =

American philosopher (born 1942)

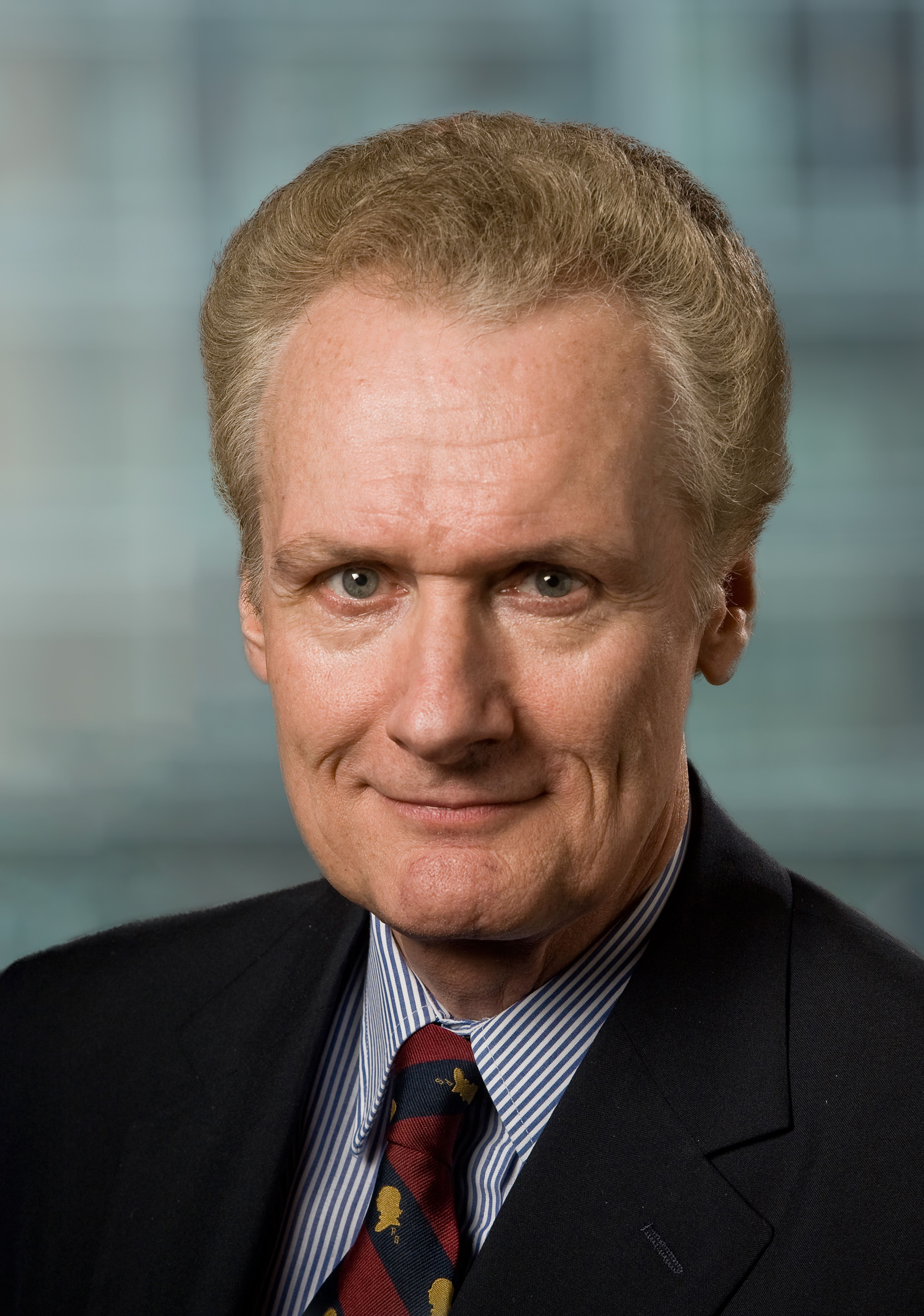
- Born: 1942 (age 83–84); Vermont, United States
- Occupations: Philosopher; constitutional scholar
- Spouse: Juliana Geran Pilon

Academic background
- Education: Columbia University (BA); University of Chicago (MA; PhD); George Washington University School of Law (JD)
- Thesis: A Theory of Rights: Toward Limited Government (1979)

Academic work
- School or tradition: Classical liberalism
- Institutions: Cato Institute

Roger Pilon (born 1942) is an American philosopher and constitutional scholar working in the classical liberal tradition. He is a senior fellow in the Cato Institute's Center for Constitutional Studies, which he founded in 1989 and directed until January 2019.

== Early life and education ==
Roger Pilon was born in Vermont in 1942, and grew up in rural upstate New York near the village of Galway. After graduating from high school, Pilon started college at Syracuse University as an engineering major, but finished his first year as a music major before deciding to interrupt his formal education. He spent the next seven years engaged in what he called a "wonderful odyssey of discovery" before returning to college in 1968.

In 1971, Pilon graduated from Columbia University's School of General Studies with a Bachelor of Arts in philosophy. He then attended the University of Chicago, where he earned a Master of Arts and PhD in philosophy. Pilon wrote his doctoral dissertation, A Theory of Rights: Toward Limited Government, under the direction of Professors Alan Gewirth and Alan Donagan in the philosophy department, and Milton Friedman in the economics department. During this time he also studied with Richard A. Epstein in the law school.

While serving as a senior political appointee in the Reagan administration, Pilon earned a Juris Doctor from the George Washington University School of Law. He is married to Juliana Geran Pilon, also a philosopher, whom he met at the University of Chicago.

== Career ==
Before receiving his doctorate at Chicago in 1979, Pilon taught philosophy briefly at California State University, Sonoma, and then philosophy of law at the Emory University School of Law in Atlanta. While at Emory he was awarded a one-year National Fellowship by Stanford University's Hoover Institution, following which he was a senior fellow at the Institute for Humane Studies, located then in Menlo Park, California. In April 1981, Pilon was invited to join the new Reagan administration as a senior political appointee, serving serially in the Office of Personnel Management, the State Department, and the Justice Department, which he left in October 1988 to join the Cato Institute.

Pilon is a senior fellow in the Cato Institute's Center for Constitutional Studies, which he established in 1989. He served as director of the center until January 2019, and as Cato's vice president for legal affairs from 1999 until 2019. He is publisher emeritus of the Cato Supreme Court Review, which he founded in 2001. He has taught at the Federal Executive Institute in Charlottesville, Virginia; and, through The Fund for American Studies, he has been an adjunct professor in Georgetown University's Department of Government, teaching in that capacity in Washington and summers in Prague and Budapest.

In January 1988, when Pilon was serving as the first director of the Justice Department's new Asylum Policy and Review Unit, the department's Office of Professional Responsibility (OPR) informed him that he was under investigation on suspicion of disclosing classified information to a foreign government. He was placed on administrative leave while under investigation. Nine months later, following a de novo review of the case, Pilon was cleared and his security clearances were restored. An erroneous account of the investigation later surfaced in OPR's annual report, falsely claiming that it had collected enough evidence against Pilon to justify dismissing him, and that he resigned before he could be removed. The department conducted two more de novo reviews, both clearing him, following which they issued an apology and an award of $25,000. When subsequent leaks to the media insinuated otherwise, Pilon brought suit against the Justice Department, claiming a violation of the Privacy Act. On January 16, 1996, a unanimous panel of the U.S. Court of Appeals for the District of Columbia Circuit found for Pilon. After more than eight years, from start to finish, the case settled when the government awarded Pilon $250,000. Discovery over that time found that the illegal leaks had come from the Justice Department's own Office of Professional Responsibility.

== Recognition ==
External videos
- Tribute to Roger Pilon from the 31st Annual Benefactor Summit – Cato Institute (23:05 min)

In 1989, the National Press Foundation and the Commission on the Bicentennial of the United States Constitution presented Pilon with its Benjamin Franklin Award for excellence in writing on the U.S. Constitution. In June 1997, he gave his high school's commencement address after he was inducted into the Galway Central School's Hall of Fame. In 2001, Columbia University's School of General Studies awarded Pilon its Alumni Medal of Distinction; a year later, in June 2002, he gave the school's commencement address. In 2023, to mark the 75th anniversary of Columbia University's School of General Studies, the school included Pilon among "75 trailblazers who studied at GS and transformed the world".

== Publications ==
=== Book chapters ===
- Pilon, Roger (1987). "Legislative Activism, Judicial Activism, and the Decline of Private Sovereignty". In Dorn, James A.; Manne, Henry G. (eds.). Economic Liberties and the Judiciary. Fairfax, VA: George Mason University Press. pp. 183–203. ISBN 978-0-9139-6917-5.
- — (1988). "Property Rights, Takings, and a Free Society". In Gwartney, James D.; Wagner, Richard E. (eds.). Public Choice and Constitutional Economics. JAI Press. pp. 151–179. ISBN 978-0-8923-2935-9.
- — (2000). "The Illegitimate War on Drugs". In Lynch, Timothy (ed.). After Prohibition: An Adult Approach to Drug Policies in the 21st Century. Foreword by Milton Friedman. Washington, D.C.: Cato Institute. pp. 23–40. ISBN 1-8825-7793-0.
- — (2002). "Restoring Constitutional Government". In Swanson, James L. (ed.). Cato Supreme Court Review, 2001-2002. Washington, D.C.: Cato Institute. ISBN 978-1-9308-6535-8.
- — (2002). "Madison's Constitutional Vision: The Legacy of Enumerated Powers". In Samples, John (ed.). James Madison and the Future of Limited Government. Washington, D.C.: Cato Institute. pp. 25–41. ISBN 978-1-9308-6523-5.
- — (2003). "A Constitution of Liberty for China". In Dorn, James A. (ed.). China in the New Millennium: Market Reforms and Social Development. Washington, D.C.: Cato Institute. pp. 333–353. ISBN 978-1-8825-7761-3.
- — (2016). "Justice Scalia's Originalism: Original or Post-New Deal?". In Shapiro, Ilya (ed.). Cato Supreme Court Review: 2015-2016. Washington, D.C.: Cato Institute. ISBN 978-1-9444-2419-0.
- — (2022). "Congress, the Courts, and the Constitution". Cato Handbook for Policymakers (9th ed.). Washington, D.C.: Cato Institute. pp. 141–171. ISBN 978-1-9522-2369-3.
- — (2025). "Restoring the right to property as fundamental to a free society". In Laitos, Jan G. (ed.). Rethinking the Law of Private Property. Edward Elgar Publishing. pp. 3–67. ISBN 978-1-0353-1135-4.
- — (2026). "The Purpose and Limits of Government". In Berry, Thomas A. (ed.). A History of Repeated Injuries: Threats to Liberty Since American Independence. Washington, D.C.: Cato Institute. pp. 9–42. ISBN 978-1-9692-8406-9.

=== Books as editor ===
- Pilon, Roger, ed. (1990). Flag-Burning, Discrimination, and the Right to Do Wrong: Two Debates (PDF). Washington, D.C.: Cato Institute.
- Crane, Edward H.; Pilon, Roger, eds. (1993). The Politics and Law of Term Limits. Washington, D.C.: Cato Institute. ISBN 1-8825-7712-4.
- Pilon, Roger, ed. (2000). The Rule of Law in the Wake of Clinton. Washington, D.C.: Cato Institute. ISBN 1-9308-6503-1.

=== Forewords and prefaces ===
- Hyde, Henry (1995). Forfeiting Our Property Rights: Is Your Property Safe From Seizure?. Washington, D.C.: Cato Institute. pp. vii–x. ISBN 978-1-8825-7718-7.
- [Cato] (2002). The Declaration of Independence and the Constitution of the United States (PDF). Washington, D.C.: Cato Institute. pp. 1–7. OCLC 1295729687.

=== Selected articles ===
- Pilon, Roger (1979). A Theory of Rights: Toward Limited Government (PDF) (PhD thesis). University of Chicago, Department of Philosophy. OCLC 28783345.
- — (1979). "Ordering Rights Consistently: Or What We Do and Do Not Have Rights To". Georgia Law Review. 13: 1171–1196. ISSN 0016-8300.
- — (2005). "The United States Constitution: From Limited Government to Leviathan" (PDF). Economic Education Bulletin. XLV (12). Great Barrington, MA: American Institute for Economic Research. ISBN 0-9136-1041-0. ISSN 0424-2769.
- — (2008). "The Constitutional Protection of Property Rights: America and Europe" (PDF). Economic Education Bulletin. XLVIII (6). Great Barrington, MA: American Institute for Economic Research. ISBN 978-0-9136-1061-9. ISSN 0424-2769.
- — (2013). "On the Origins of the Modern Libertarian Legal Movement" (PDF). Chapman Law Review. 16 (2): 255–268. ISSN 2381-3245.
