= William Franke =

William Franke may refer to:

- William B. Franke, United States Secretary of the Navy, 1959–1961
- William Franke (philosopher), professor of philosophy and religions at the University of Macau and professor of comparative literature at Vanderbilt University
- Bill Franke (William A. Franke), chairman of Wizz Air and Frontier Airlines
