= Paul du Quenoy =

American historian

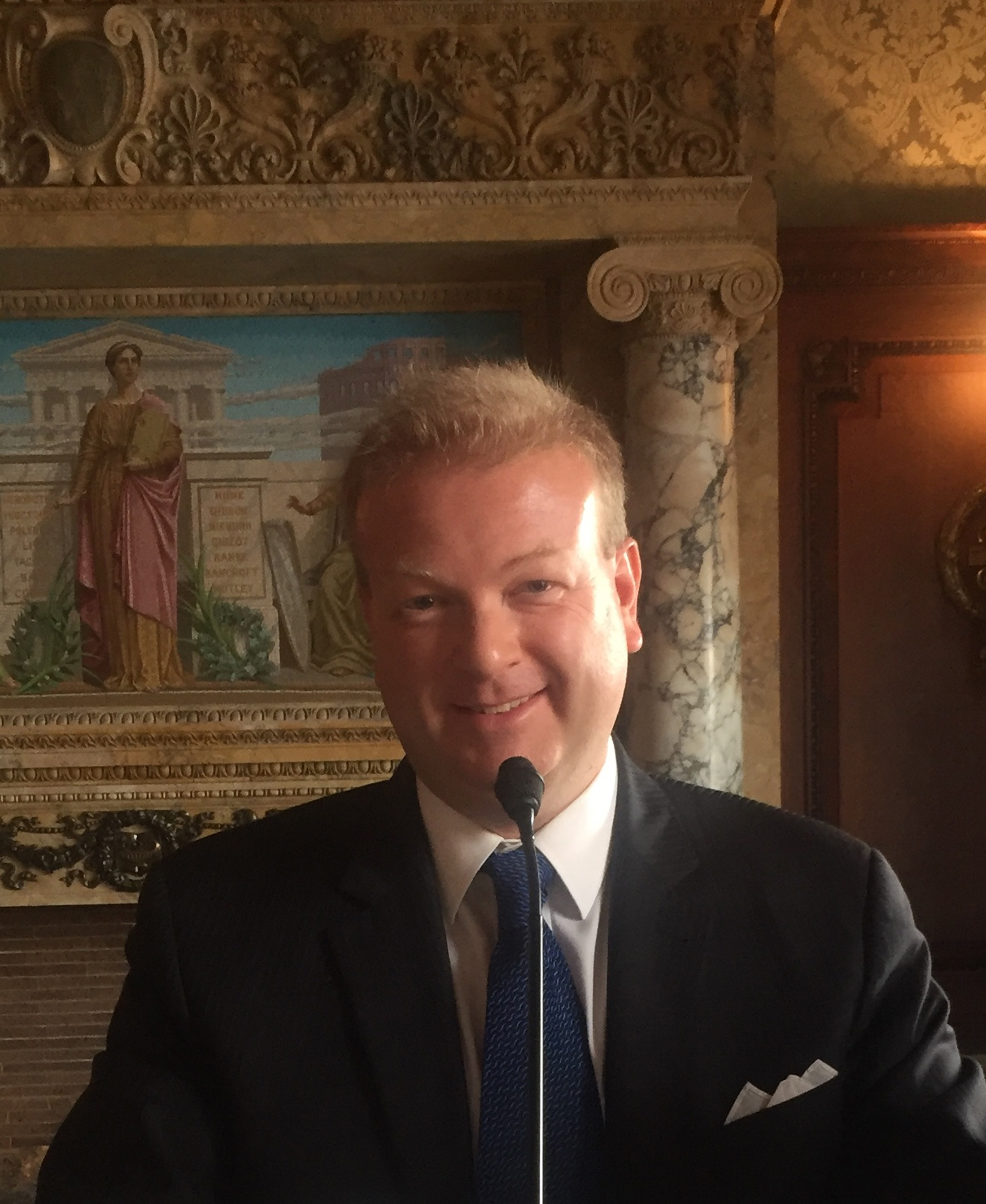
Official Portrait

Paul du Quenoy FRSA FRHistS is an American publisher, critic, and historian. He is president and CEO of Academica Press, an international non-fiction publisher based in Washington, D.C., and London, and president of the Palm Beach Freedom Institute.

== Background ==
Paul du Quenoy graduated from George Washington University and received his Ph.D. from Georgetown University. In his academic career, he taught at Georgetown, George Washington University, the American University in Cairo, and the American University of Beirut, and was a Fulbright scholar in Russia. He has received fellowships and other awards from the National Endowment for the Arts, the Kennan Institute for Advanced Russian Studies, the American Historical Association, the Andrew W. Mellon Foundation, and the Slavic-Eurasian Research Center at Hokkaido University in Japan. He is a Fellow of the Royal Society of Arts and the Royal Historical Society.

== Academic work ==
Du Quenoy's first book, Stage Fright: Politics and the Performing Arts in Late Imperial Russia, was published in 2009. The book attacks Soviet arguments and demonstrates the vital commercial elements in Russian culture, which du Quenoy argues was relatively free before the Revolution of 1917. According to the Modern Language Review Stage Fright offers "a detailed counter-argument to teleological readings of the cultural and political situation in late imperial Russia." The book was commended by Princeton University Russia scholar Caryl Emerson for "its devastating command of the historical record." Professor E. Anthony Swift of the University of Essex described it as an "important new contribution to the field" that "should be read by anyone interested in the relationship of politics and the arts."

Du Quenoy subsequently published Wagner and the French Muse: Music, Society, and Nation in Modern France (2011), an extensively documented narrative of the German composer Richard Wagner's reception in France. Novelist, poet, and Welsh National Opera dramaturg Simon Rees's review in Opera magazine called it a "rattling good read" and "well-written analysis." His third book, Alexander Serov and the Birth of the Russian Modern (2016, rev. 2nd edition 2022) was described by Russian Review as a "new angle" with "views that allow for a reexamination of some of the century's biggest controversies." Music and Letters described it as "ably written, balanced, highly detailed, and documented with care ... As such it outdoes existing Russian efforts." He has also published a volume of selected music criticism. The Royal Opera's chorus director William Spaulding hailed it as "knowledgeable and accessible," adding that "Paul du Quenoy's brilliant reviews reveal the timelessness of opera's core values."

== Writing ==
Du Quenoy contributes criticism and commentary on art, society, and politics to a variety of publications. His writing has appeared in the New York Times, Newsweek, the New York Post, The Daily Telegraph, the Washington Times, the Los Angeles Review of Books, Washington Examiner, The Spectator, New Criterion, The National Interest, Musical America, Tablet, City Journal, Modern Age (periodical), Chronicles (magazine), American Conservative, The Critic, The European Conservative, New York Classical Review, and various academic journals, including the American Historical Review, Journal of Modern History, International History Review, and Russian Review. His music criticism has included bylines from New York, London, Paris, Berlin, Munich, Vienna, Budapest, Zürich, San Francisco, Rome, Milan, Venice, Naples, Tokyo, St. Petersburg, Barcelona, Santa Fe, Chicago, Washington, Boston, Houston, Miami, Palm Beach, Beirut, and the Salzburg, Bayreuth, Verona, Glimmerglass, and Aix-en-Provence Festivals.

== Society ==
Paul du Quenoy has since 2013 been chairman of the Russian Ball, Washington, D.C., a historic White Russian emigre social event held in the U.S. capital.

To protest the University of Michigan's disciplinary investigation of the composer Bright Sheng for having screened Laurence Olivier's 1965 film version of Shakespeare's Othello, in which Olivier appeared in black face, du Quenoy commissioned Sheng to compose a symphonic overture on the theme of freedom. The disciplinary investigation was subsequently dropped. The commissioned overture, titled "Triumph of Humanity," premiered at the opening concert of the Palm Beach Symphony's 50th anniversary season on November 19, 2023, under the baton of music director Gerard Schwarz. Du Quenoy conducted the Star-Spangled Banner to open the concert.

In 2024, the Crown Council of Ethiopia granted du Quenoy the Victory of Adwa Centenary Medal in recognition of his advocacy and charitable work. The Council's president Prince Ermias Sahle Selassie recognized du Quenoy among "supporters in the international community who give aid to the patriots struggling to restore peace and freedom."

Du Quenoy was a sponsor of Palm Beach Opera's annual gala in 2025, when it featured the Russian soprano Anna Netrebko as its recital soloist. The occasion marked Netrebko's return to the North American stage after more than five years of absence due to political fallout from the Russian invasion of Ukraine.

== Books ==
- Stage Fright: Politics and the Performing Arts in Late Imperial Russia (2009)
- Wagner and the French Muse: Music, Society, and Nation in Modern France (2011)
- Alexander Serov and the Birth of the Russian Modern (2016/2022)
- Cancel Culture: Tales from the Front Lines (2021)
- Through the Years with Prince Charming: The Collected Music Criticism of Paul du Quenoy (2021)
