= Jeffrey S. Morton =

American educator (born 1964)

Jeffrey S. Morton (born March 13, 1964) is the Pierrepont Comfort Chair in Political Science at Florida Atlantic University and a Senior Fellow at the Foreign Policy Association. A native of North Carolina, he earned a B.A. from the University of North Carolina at Charlotte, an M.A. from Rutgers University and Ph.D. from the University of South Carolina in 1995. In 1986 he completed the International Law Commission Summer training program at the United Nations Office at Geneva. Morton has written four books and numerous journal articles, book chapters and editorials.

== Research ==
Jeffrey Morton specializes in international law with a principal focus on the laws of armed conflict. His first book, The International Law Commission of the United Nations (University of South Carolina Press, 2001), is an empirical analysis of the Commission’s work on the Draft Code of Crimes Against the Peace and Security of Mankind. The manuscript was well received as one of the first data-based analyses in the field. His journal publications have addressed a wide range of conflicts and weapons of war, including blinding lasers, tactical nuclear weapons, landmines, depleted uranium shells, mercenaries, genocide and the 1999 Kosovo War.

== Other Work and Engagement ==
Jeffrey Morton has founded and developed three major programs at Florida Atlantic University. In 1996 he established the Diplomacy Program, which trains undergraduate students in the art of diplomacy and conflict resolution. His program has competed in academic diplomacy simulations nationally and internationally. In 2016, the program was named in honor of Leon Charney, a key player in the Camp David Accord.

In 1997 he co-established the FAU Peace Studies Program, which he directed from 2001 until 2005. Peace Studies was transformed in 2016 into the Peace, Justice & Human Rights Initiative. Jeffrey Morton has served on the Program's Executive Committee since its inception. In 2020, made possible with a seed donation of $500,000, the Morton Research Forum was established in the Harriet L. Wilkes Honors College at Florida Atlantic. The Forum serves as a think tank that promotes critical studies of American foreign policy and global affairs.

Jeffrey Morton lectures widely on matters of international law, U.S. foreign policy, conflict and terrorism. In 2021, the Foreign Policy Association launched its annual Great Decisions Master Class. Jeffrey Morton delivers the eight lecture series.

== Foreign Policy Views ==
Jeffrey Morton is considered a pragmatist in his conceptualization of world affairs and U.S. foreign policy, grounding his analysis in legal realism. He was a strong supporter of the U.S. invasion of Iraq in 1991 following its occupation of Kuwait, but was a vocal public critic of the U.S. invasion of Iraq in 2003, both prior to and after the intervention. He claimed that even a quick and successful war that introduced democracy in Iraq would result in a significant strategic victory for Iran. In a live television interview on the day that NATO forces initiated an aerial assault on Libya in 2011, Morton labeled the policy a strategic blunder. He argued that Libya, like Iraq in 2003, was ill prepared for democratic pluralism and would ultimately disintegrate into lawless factions. In response to the Russian invasion of Ukraine in 2022, Morton called for the Western military support aimed at restoring Ukrainian sovereignty over territory lost to Russia since 2014.

== Publications ==
Model United Nations: An Essential Guide for Students Preparing for Simulation Conferences. Washington, D.C.: Academica Press. (2025).

"Three-Way Prisoners' Dilemma." International Journal of the Humanities and Social Studies. (2024)

"Women and War: A Cross-Sectional Analysis of Women’s Rights in Post-Civil War Society." Co-authored with Mehmet Gurses and Aimee Arias. Civil Wars (2020).

"Reflections on the International Law Commission." Florida International University Journal of International Law (2019).

"The Legality of the NATO Invasion of Libya." The International Journal of Interdisciplinary Social Sciences: Annual Review (2015).

“The Mine Ban Treaty: Compliance Among Latin American States." International Journal of Interdisciplinary Social Sciences (2012).

“The Arab Spring: Implications for Israeli Security." Mediterranean Quarterly (2012).

“The Prohibition on Landmines.” International Journal of the Humanities (2009).

“Crisis in American Foreign Policy Identity.” International Journal of the Humanities (2007).

“Depleted Uranium Munitions: Clear Threat to Human Security.” Australasian Journal of Human Security (2006).

“The Legal Status of Tactical Nuclear Weapons.” International Journal of the Humanities (2006).

“The Legal Regulation of Conflict Diamonds.” Journal of Politics & Policy (2005).

“Re-Assessing the ‘Power of Power Politics’ Thesis: Is Realism Still Dominant?” International Studies Review (2005).

Reflections on the Balkans: Ten Years After the Break-Up of Yugoslavia. (Palgrave Macmillan Press, 2004).

“The Legality of NATO’s Intervention in Yugoslavia in 1999: Implications for the Progressive Development of International Law.” Journal of International and Comparative Law (2003).

“The International Legal Regime on Genocide.” Journal of Genocide Research (2003).

“The Legal Status of Mercenaries.” Journal of Politics & Policy (2002).

“The International Legal Adjudication of the Crime of Genocide.” Journal of International and Comparative Law (2001).

“Uncertainty, Change and War: Power Fluctuations and War in the Modern Elite Power System.” Journal of Peace Research (2001)

“The United Nations and US Participation: The UNESCO Case.” Political Chronicle (2001).

The International Law Commission of the United Nations. (University of South Carolina Press, 2000).

"The End of the Cold War and International Law: An Empirical Analysis." Journal of Global Society (1999).

“The Legal Status of Laser Weapons that Blind.” Journal of Peace Research (1998).

"The International Law Commission of the United Nations: Legal Vacuum or Microcosm of World Politics?" International Interactions (1997).
