= Alexander Hamilton Institute for the Study of Western Civilization =

Conservative think tank

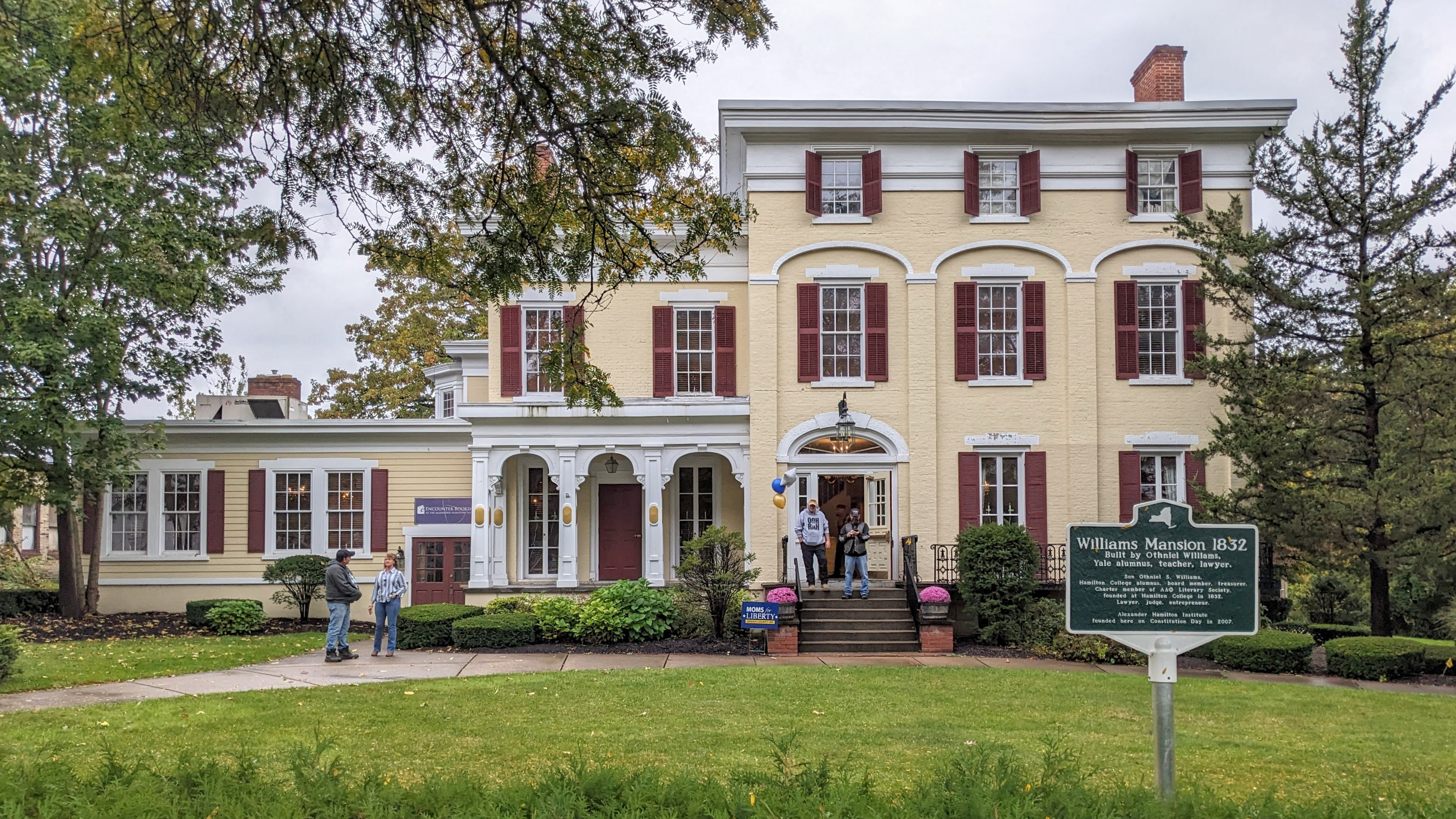
- The Williams Mansion, home of the AHI
- Abbreviation: AHI
- Named after: Alexander Hamilton
- Formation: 2007; 19 years ago
- Headquarters: 21 W Park Row
- Location: Clinton, New York, USA
- Coordinates: 43.0492674°N 75.3819697°W
- President: Robert L. Paquette
- Revenue: $270,788 (2019)
- Expenses: $246,842 (2019)
- Website: theahi.org

The Alexander Hamilton Institute for the Study of Western Civilization is a think tank in Clinton, New York, founded in 2007. It is independent of Hamilton College in Clinton.

== History ==
History professor Robert L. Paquette of Hamilton College led an attempt to create an "Alexander Hamilton Center" on the Hamilton College campus, but it was unsuccessful. A faculty vote voiced concern that the proposal to establish this alumni-financed center to study "capitalism, natural law and the role of religion in politics" would have an overt conservative political tendency and would not be subject to sufficient oversight by the school. The college's decision not to proceed drew criticism from conservative commentators, and the institute was established as an off-campus, independent entity. The first director of the institute was federal appeals court judge David Aldrich Nelson. Philanthropist Jane Fraser joined the board in the institute's first year.

Since its founding, it has continued to host numerous speakers and hold events on-campus. It helps to maintain on-campus academic reading clusters and conservative organizations.

== People ==
People affiliated with the Alexander Hamilton Institute:

- James Bradfield, cofounder and charter fellow.
- Jane Fraser, board member.
- David B. Frisk, resident fellow.
- Mary Grabar, resident fellow
- David Aldrich Nelson (1932–2010), its first director.
- David K. Nichols, senior fellow
- Mary P. Nichols, senior fellow
- Robert L. Paquette, cofounder and fellow
- Juliana Geran Pilon, senior fellow.
