= Nikolay Fyodorovitch von Ditmar =

Russian industrialist and politician

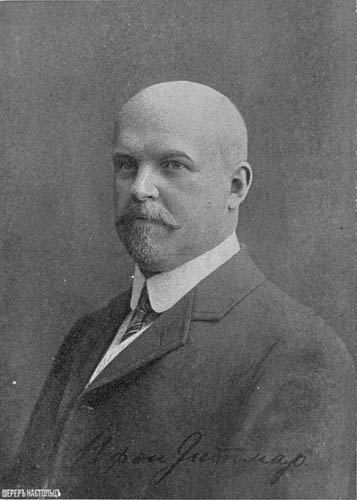

Nikolai Fyodorovitch von Ditmar (b. Moscow, May 10, 1865; died Kharkov, July 18, 1919) was an industrialist, entrepreneur, socialite, and politician from the Russian Empire.

== Biography ==
Born into the hereditary nobility of the Russian Empire, von Ditmar was of Baltic German origin. He graduated from St. Petersburg's Mining Institute in 1889 and studied chemistry with the scientist Dmitri Mendeleev. After an early engineering career in manufacturing and railroad construction, von Ditmar settled in Kharkov where he founded a factory that produced mining engineering equipment. It enjoyed rapid success and in 1902 he was elected a member of the city duma. From 1906 to 1917 von Ditmar served as chairman of the Council of Mining Industrialists of Southern Russia. In 1912 he was chosen to sit in the State Council of the Russian Empire, the upper house of the country's quasi-parliament.

During the Russian Civil War he supported the anti-communist Hetman of Ukraine Pavlo Skoropadskyi and the White Russian General Anton Denikin.

His great-great-granddaughter is the international relations scholar Irina Papkova.
