= Russian Ball, Washington, D.C. =

Invitation-only dinner dance

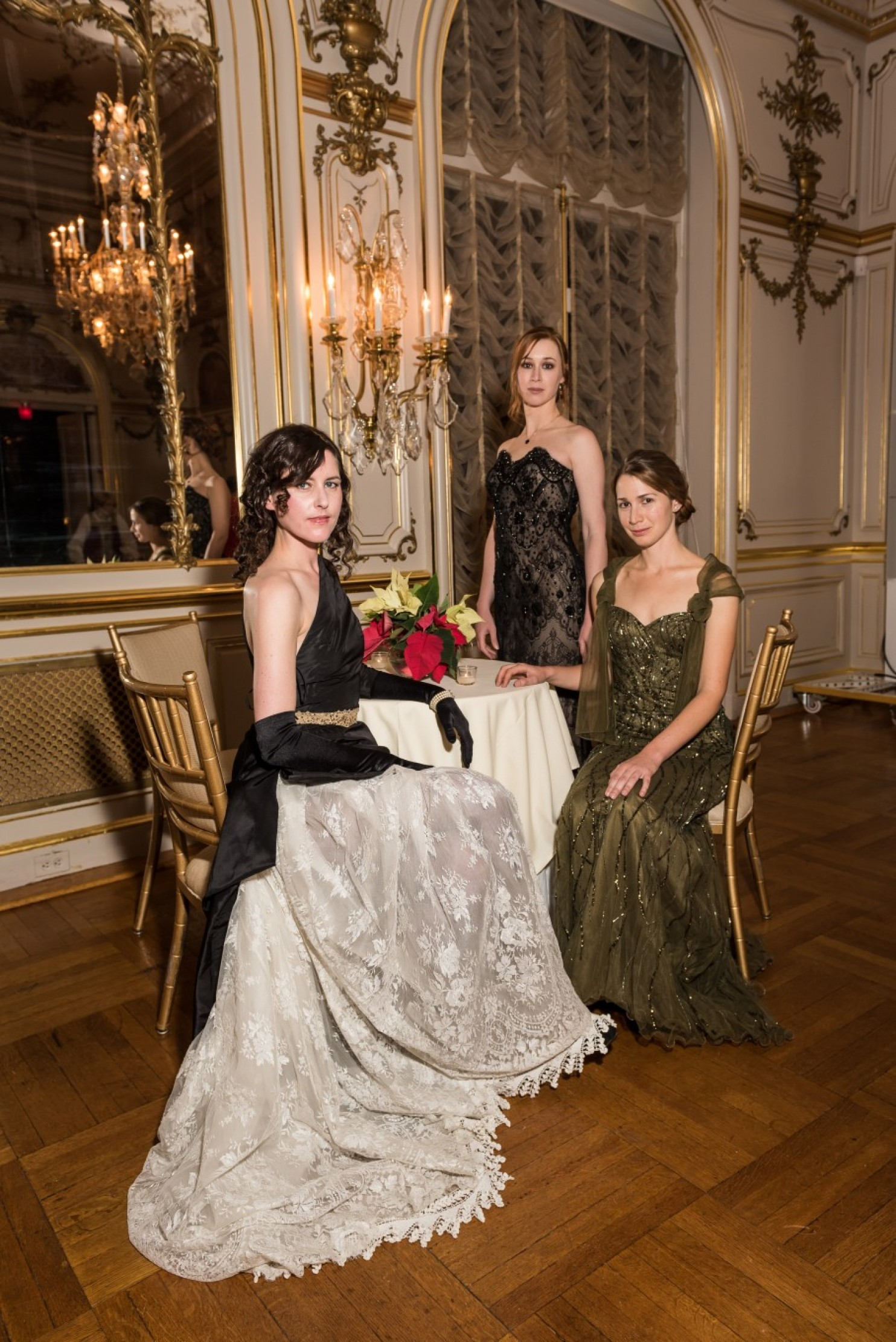
Countess Anja von Kalinowski and Predislava and Vasilissa Derugin, Russian Ball, Washington, DC, January 10, 2015

The Russian Ball of Washington, DC is an invitation-only dinner dance. The Ball is an annual tradition founded in 1971 by the socialite Maria Fisher. An enthusiast of holding "heritage parties" celebrating different ethnicities, Fisher acted on the suggestion of Prince Alexis Obolensky, a Russian nobleman who resided in Washington, to organize a ball celebrating the city's White émigré community around the time of the old style Julian calendar New Year in mid-January. Prince Obolensky and his American wife Selene chaired the ball until his death in 2006. Princess Obolensky continued to chair the ball alone until she stepped down for health reasons in 2013.

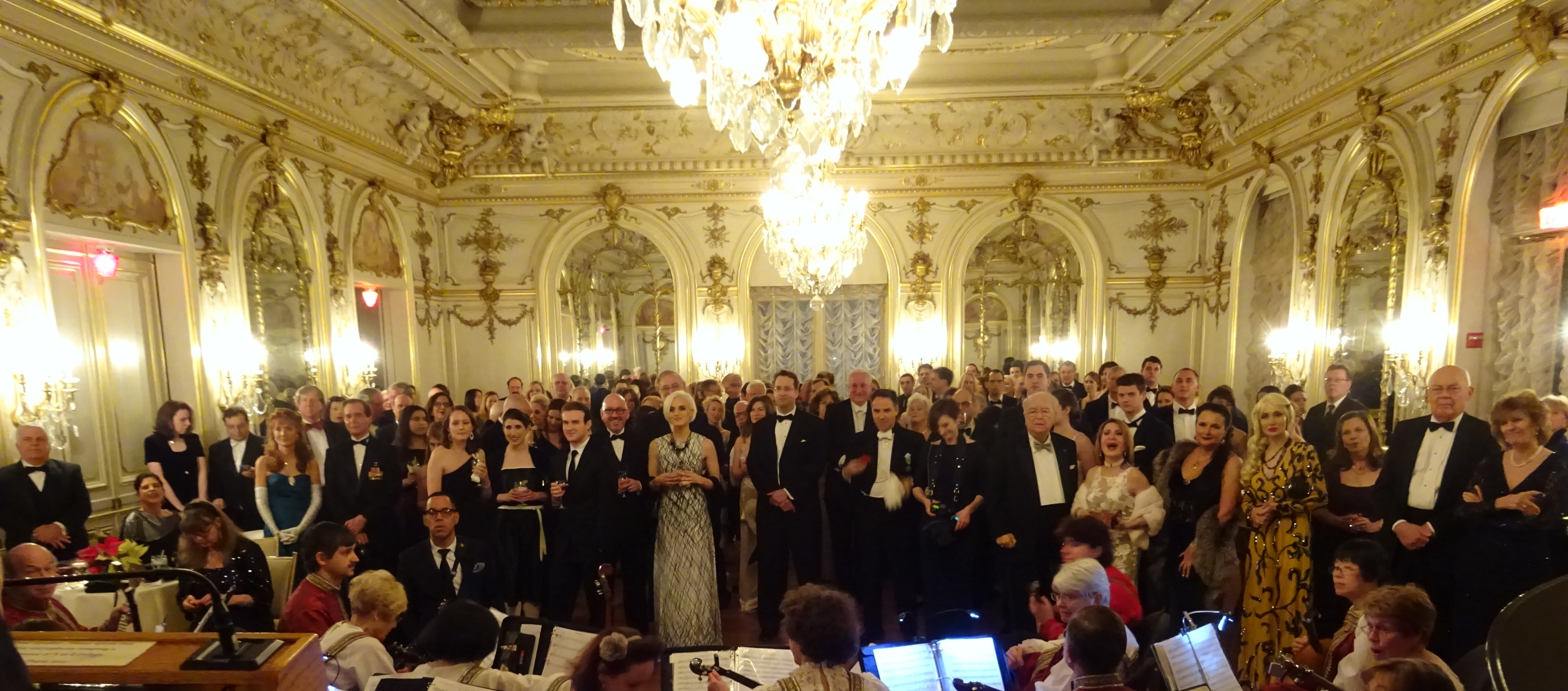
Russian Ball, Washington, DC January 10, 2015

The Russian Ball's current chairmen are Professor and Mrs. Paul du Quenoy. It is co-chaired by Prince Nicholas Obolensky. Its committee has included members of the Tolstoy, Putiatin, Shakhovskoy, Chavchavadze, Volkonsky, Schimmelpenninck, Borchgrave, Roosevelt, and Wanamaker families as well as Prince Ermias Sahle Selassie of Ethiopia, Congressman James W. Symington, Senator Larry Pressler, and Edward T. Wilson, grandson of the American businessman Thomas E. Wilson.

The Ball's Patroness is Maria Vladimirovna, Grand Duchess of Russia, Head of the Imperial House of Romanov.

Dress is white tie, black tie or national costume.
