= Jere van Dyk =

American journalist

Jere Van Dyk
- Born: December 14, 1945 (age 80); United States
- Education: University of Oregon
- Occupations: Journalist, author
- Known for: Reporting on Afghanistan and Pakistan; Being kidnapped in 2008; Author of Captive and The Trade

Jere Van Dyk (born 14 December 1945) is an American journalist and author known for his reporting from Afghanistan and Pakistan. Over his career, he has worked for The New York Times and CBS News, published books on conflict and kidnapping, and appeared widely as a commentator on international affairs. He was captured and held by the Taliban in 2008, an experience he later chronicled in his memoir Captive. In 2022, he received a Foreign Press Award.

== Athletics ==
In college, Van Dyk competed for the Oregon Ducks track and field team under coach Bill Bowerman. He specialized in middle-distance events and achieved personal bests of 1:47.3 in the 800 metres and 3:40.4 in the 1500 metres.

== Journalism career ==
In the early 1980s, Van Dyk lived with the Afghan Mujahideen while covering the Soviet–Afghan War as a correspondent for The New York Times, producing Pulitzer Prize–nominated articles.

After the September 11 attacks, he returned to Afghanistan and Pakistan as a reporter for CBS News, covering the U.S.-led war and regional conflicts.

In 2008, Van Dyk was hiking in the tribal areas of Pakistan—off limits to foreigners—while researching the Afghanistan-Pakistan border region when he was kidnapped by the Taliban and held for 45 days. He later chronicled this ordeal in his memoir Captive: My Time as a Prisoner of the Taliban (2010).

From 2013 to 2015, Van Dyk served as an adjunct senior fellow at the Council on Foreign Relations, during which time he researched the Haqqani Network, ISIS, the Taliban, and al-Qaeda. These experiences informed his 2017 book The Trade: My Journey into the Labyrinth of Political Kidnapping, which received a review in The New York Times Book Review.

== Public speaking and policy work ==
Van Dyk has made many media appearances and given public lectures. He has featured in interviews and discussions on platforms listed on his “Media and Public Speaking” page, and appeared in the C-SPAN video library.

== Works ==
- In Afghanistan (1983)
- Captive: My Time as a Prisoner of the Taliban (2010)
- The Trade: My Journey into the Labyrinth of Political Kidnapping (2017)
