= Hamilton College =

Private college in Clinton, New York, US

- Latin: Collegium Hamiltonense
- Former name: Hamilton-Oneida Academy (1793–1812)
- Motto: Γνῶθι Σεαυτόν (Ancient Greek)
- Motto in English: "Know Thyself"
- Type: Private liberal arts college
- Established: 1812; 214 years ago
- Accreditation: MSCHE
- Academic affiliations: Oberlin Group; Annapolis Group; CLAC
- Endowment: $1.5 billion (2025)
- President: Steven Tepper
- Faculty: 195 (2022)
- Undergraduates: 2,000 (2022)
- Location: Clinton address Oneida County, New York, United States; 43°03′07″N 75°24′22″W
- Campus: Midsize suburb, 1,350 acres (550 ha)
- Newspaper: The Spectator
- Colors: Continental Blue; Buff
- Nickname: Continentals
- Sporting affiliations: NCAA Division III – NESCAC; MAISA
- Mascot: Alex
- Website: www.hamilton.edu

Hamilton College is a private liberal arts college in Clinton, New York, United States. It was established in 1812 in honor of Alexander Hamilton, one of its inaugural trustees, following a proposal made after his death in 1804. Since 1978, Hamilton has been a coeducational institution, having merged with its sister school, Kirkland College.

Hamilton enrolled approximately 2,000 undergraduate students as of the fall of 2021. The curriculum offers 57 areas of study, including 44 majors, as well as the option to design interdisciplinary concentrations. The student body consists of 53% female and 47% male students, representing 45 U.S. states and 46 countries. The acceptance rate for the class of 2026 was 11.8%. Hamilton's athletic teams participate in the New England Small College Athletic Conference.

== History ==
1885 Lithograph of Clinton with sights including Hamilton College identified drawn by L.R. Burleigh

Hamilton College traces its origins back to 1793, when it was chartered as the Hamilton-Oneida Academy, a seminary founded by Rev. Samuel Kirkland. The academy, located in a three-story building near the Oneida Nation's home, admitted both white and Oneida boys and was named in honor of Alexander Hamilton, who collaborated with Kirkland in starting the school and served on its first Board of Trustees. None of the Oneida boys lasted more than one year, the reason being lack of funding, along with the Oneida boys' poor knowledge of English and their lack of interest in the curriculum. The new school applied for a charter from the New York Board of Regents in 1805, and received it in 1812, conditional on raising an endowment of $50,000 (equivalent to $948,529 in 2025). Originally its location on College Hill was in the town of Paris from 1793 to 1827, then in the town of Kirkland. Clinton was not incorporated until 1843.

In 1812, pursuant to its new charter, the academy expanded its curriculum, dropped the reference to the Oneidas, and became Hamilton College, making it the fourth-oldest college in the State of New York. As the Board of Regents wanted, Hamilton started its career as a college with an endowment of $100,000 (equivalent to $1,897,059 in 2025)—a very large sum at the time. The academy buildings, grounds, and other property were valued at $15,000. To this sum were added subscriptions and parcels of land amounting to another $50,000. The New York State Legislature granted $50,000 to the new institution, and then supported it with $3,000 per year until 1850.

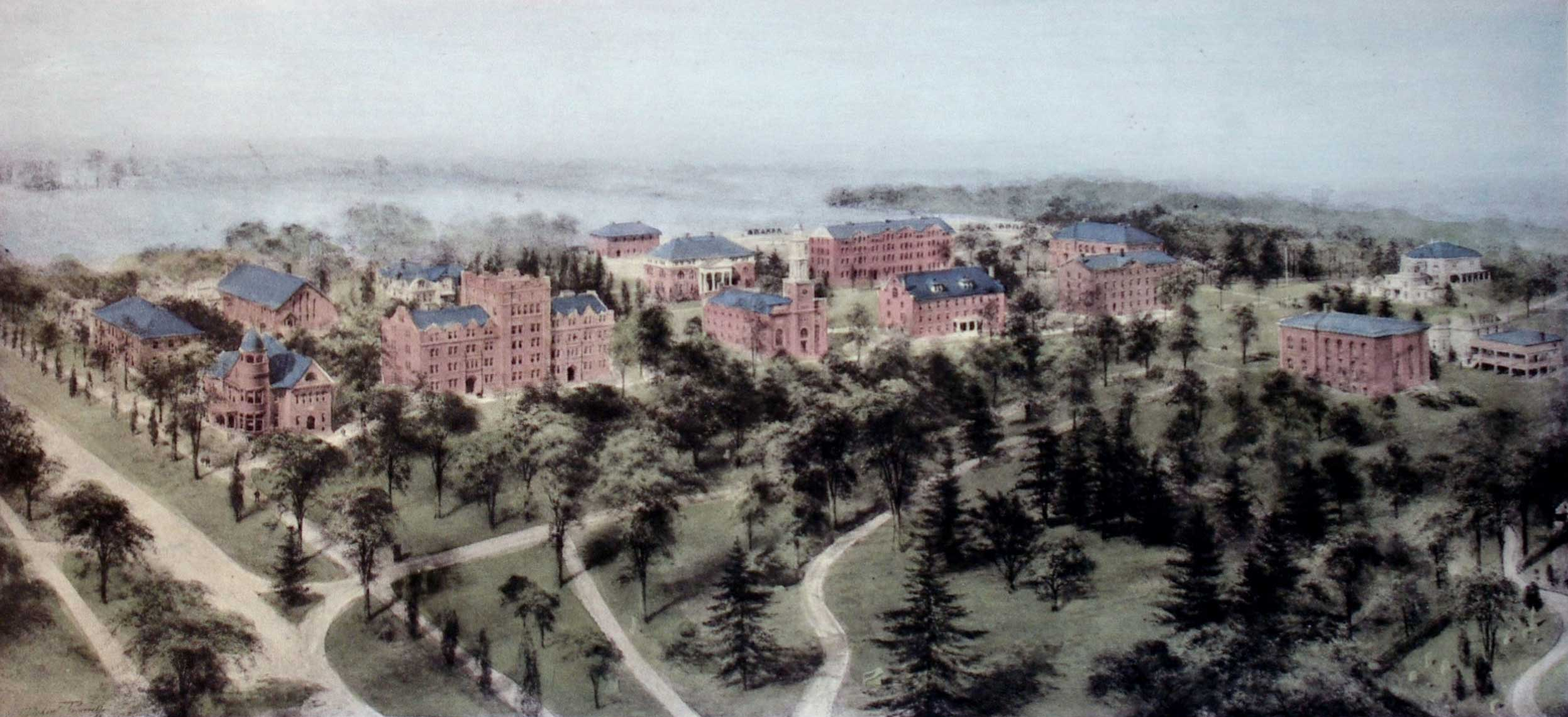
Hamilton College as painted from a hot-air balloon by watercolor artist Richard Rummell in the early 1900s

According to the 1813 rules of the college, candidates for admission had to be "able to read, translate and parse Cicero's select orations, Virgil, and the Greek testament, and to write true Latin in prose, and shall also have learned the rules of vulgar arithmetic."

In 1836 Hamilton had 115 students, four buildings, four professors, and the President.

In fall 1846, Zeng Laishun entered the college, and became the first Chinese college student to study abroad.

Over time, the college evolved into a more secular institution under the leadership of President M. Woolsey Stryker, who sought to distance Hamilton from its Presbyterian Church roots.

The college has had one female president.

=== Kirkland College ===
In the second half of the 20th century, Hamilton established a women's college, Kirkland College, on college land on the other side of College Hill Road. Though it ultimately resulted in Hamilton becoming coeducational, it lasted only about 10 years. It was perceived as less rigorous than Hamilton, although this was disputed and much discussed. The merger of the two schools, or rather the takeover by Hamilton, took place along with feelings of betrayal and lack of support from Kirkland students. On the other hand, it has been noted that Hamilton's transition to coeducation took place "more equitably" than at other men's schools, as a result of Kirkland. In the same work, "women students' interests" were deemed well represented in the modern Hamilton, which the author found "quite remarkable."

The campus today is divided into the "light side" or "north side" (former Hamilton campus) and the "dark side" or "south side" (former Kirkland campus), separated by College Hill Road. As late as 2004, the Hamilton side was called "historical" and "fraternity-dominated"; the Kirkland side was "more modern" and "politically progressive".

=== Curtailment of fraternities ===
In 1832, Alpha Delta Phi was founded at the college by Samuel Eells and four other students.

In 1995, the college announced that all students would be required to live and eat on campus and the college bought the existing fraternity houses. At that time about a third of Hamilton students were fraternity members. While fraternities were not abolished, they were no longer as central to student life. To some extent this change reflected the negative experiences that some Kirkland and then Hamilton women had with Hamilton's fraternities.

=== 21st century ===
In 2002, President Eugene Tobin resigned after admitting improper attribution of quoted material in his speeches. The same year, Professor Robert L. Paquette raised objections when a student group invited Annie Sprinkle, an actress and former pornstar, as a speaker. Paquette later led an unsuccessful effort to establish the Alexander Hamilton Center on campus. The center, now known as the Alexander Hamilton Institute for the Study of Western Civilization, is located off-campus in the village of Clinton.

== Campus ==
Hamilton College hosts many athletic facilities, including an ice rink, swimming pool, athletic fields, a golf practice facility, a three-story climbing wall, and a squash center. A new boathouse in nearby Rome was dedicated in 2022.

Hamilton College is designated as a census-designated place (CDP) by the U.S. Census Bureau. The area including and around the campus first appeared as a CDP in the 2020 Census with a population of 1,792.

=== Daniel Burke Library ===
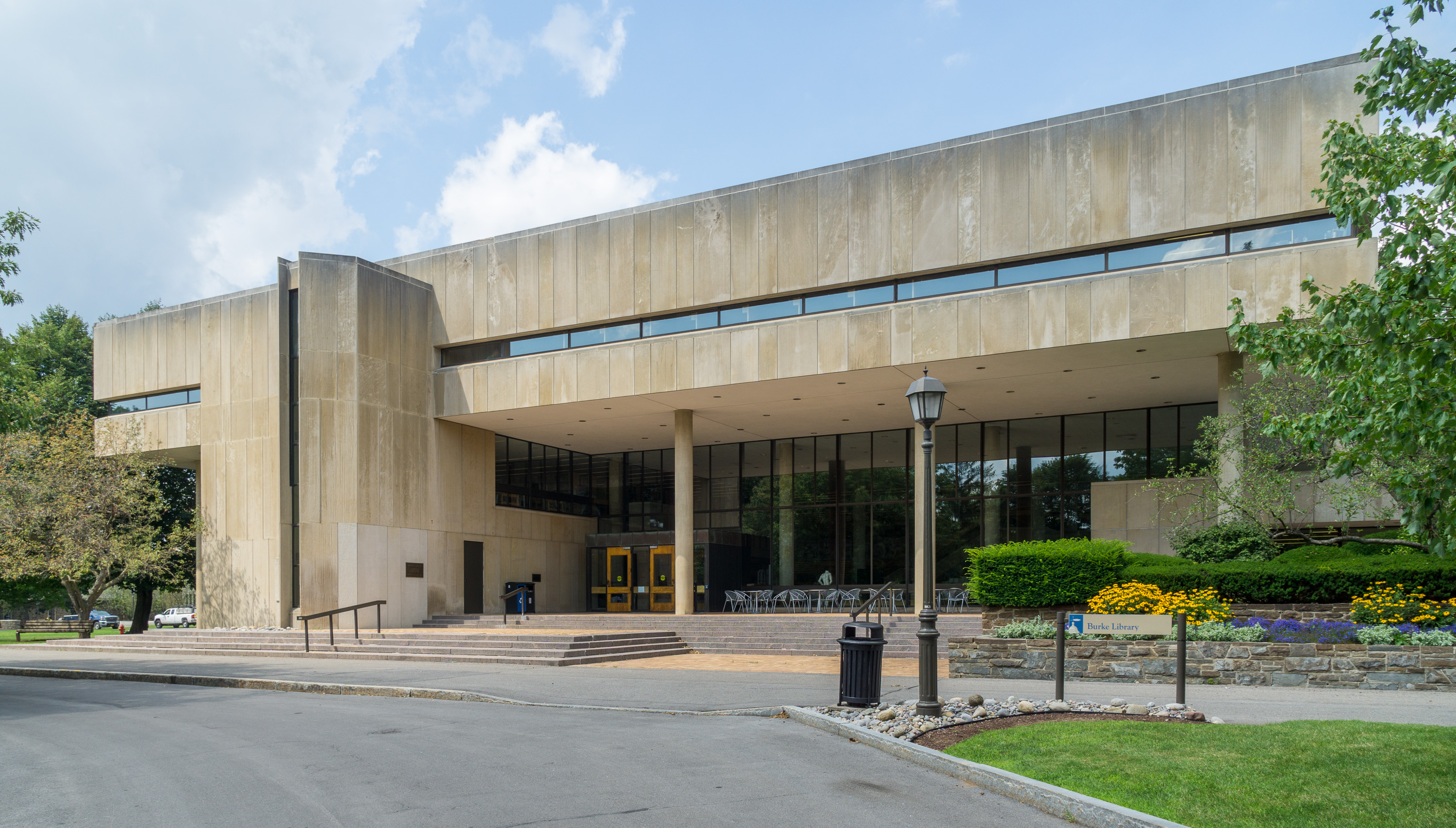
Daniel Burke Library

The Daniel Burke Library, designed by architect Hugh Stubbins, was finished in 1972 with a budget exceeding $5.5 million. Spanning around 80,000 square feet, it accommodates a collection of 500,000 volumes. The library serves as the home for information commons and information technology services, including a range of print and electronic resources.

=== Kirner-Johnson Building ===
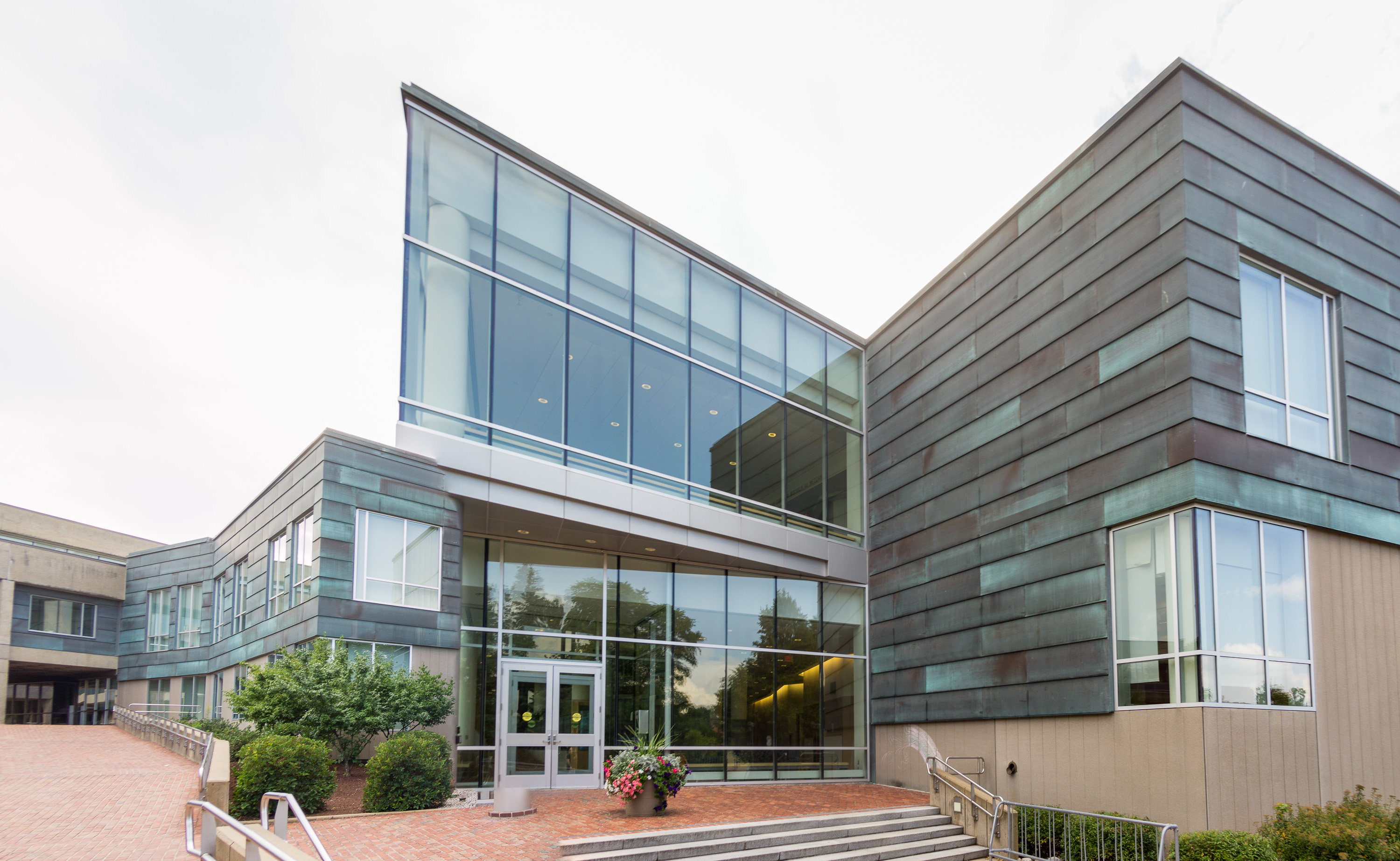
"KJ" was built in 1972 for Kirkland College

The Kirner-Johnson Building, also known as KJ, is the hub for Hamilton's social science departments, the Arthur Levitt Public Affairs Center, the Nesbitt-Johnson Writing Center, and the Oral Communication Center. It features a naturally illuminated commons area that serves as a gathering spot for students to study or socialize. The center of the commons is adorned with four small waterfalls, providing a gentle background noise that promotes conversation while providing acoustic insulation. The renovation and expansion project of the Kirner-Johnson building received an Award of Merit from the American Institute of Architects in 2004, and was completed in 2008.

=== The Sage Rink ===
Sage Rink, located at Hamilton College and constructed in 1921, is the oldest indoor collegiate hockey rink in the United States. Although Northeastern University's Matthews Arena is older, having been initially built as a commercial arena, it was not acquired by the university until 1979. Sage Rink was funded by the widow of industrialist Russell Sage, whose name is associated with various educational buildings in Central New York, including Russell Sage College. Apart from hosting the men's and women's Continental teams, the rink has accommodated youth hockey, high school teams, adult amateur leagues, and the Clinton Comets, who enjoyed success in the semi-professional Eastern Hockey League during the 1960s and early 1970s.

=== Litchfield Observatory ===
Litchfield Observatory, assigned observatory code 789, was the site where German-American astronomer Christian Peters discovered approximately 48 asteroids. Although the original observatory was destroyed by fire, its legacy is commemorated on campus through the presence of its telescope mount near the Siuda Admissions and Financial Aid House. The current observatory, a quarter mile away from the main campus, operates on solar energy and provides access for student use. Constructed using rock sourced from the same quarry as the original building, the present observatory is positioned 100 feet (30 m) from College Hill Road.

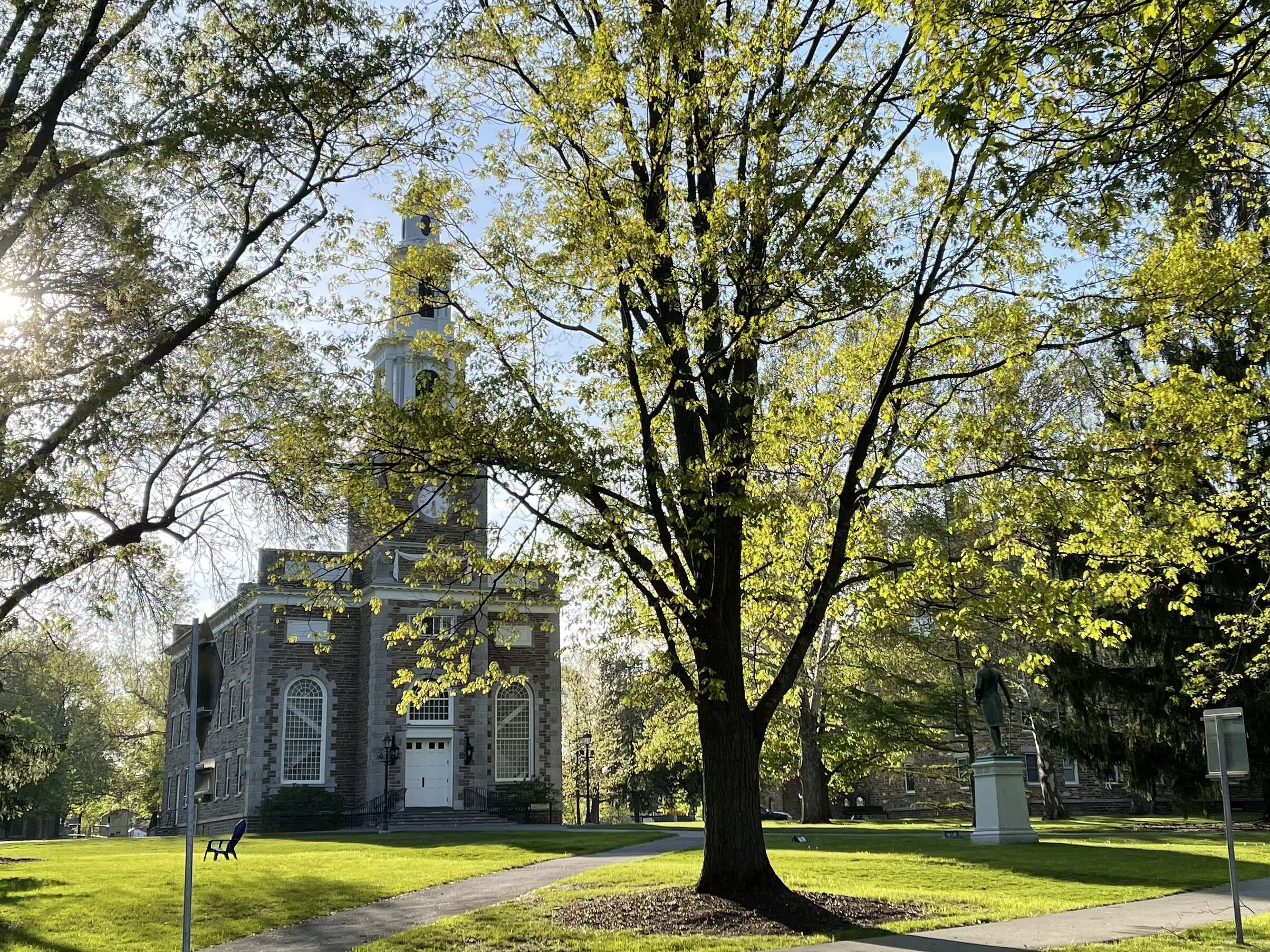
Historic Hamilton College Chapel

=== Hamilton College Chapel ===
The Hamilton College Chapel is a designated historical landmark and is notable for being the only remaining three-story chapel in the United States.

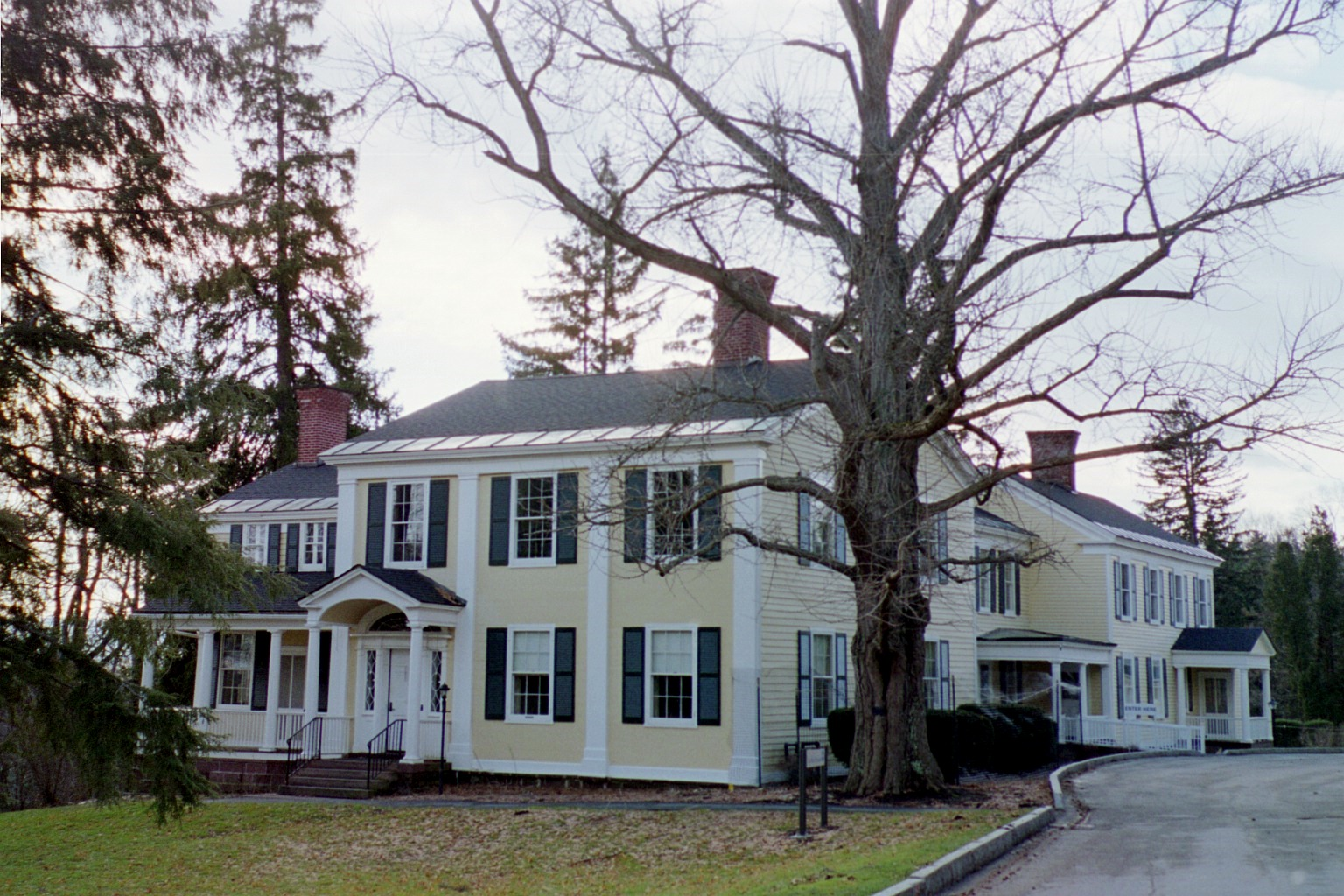
Elihu Root House

=== Days-Massolo Center ===
In 2011, Hamilton College inaugurated the Days-Massolo Center with the objective of advancing diversity awareness and facilitating dialogue among the diverse range of cultures present on campus. The center is named in honor of trustees Drew S. Days III and Arthur J. Massolo, who both made significant contributions to Hamilton College.

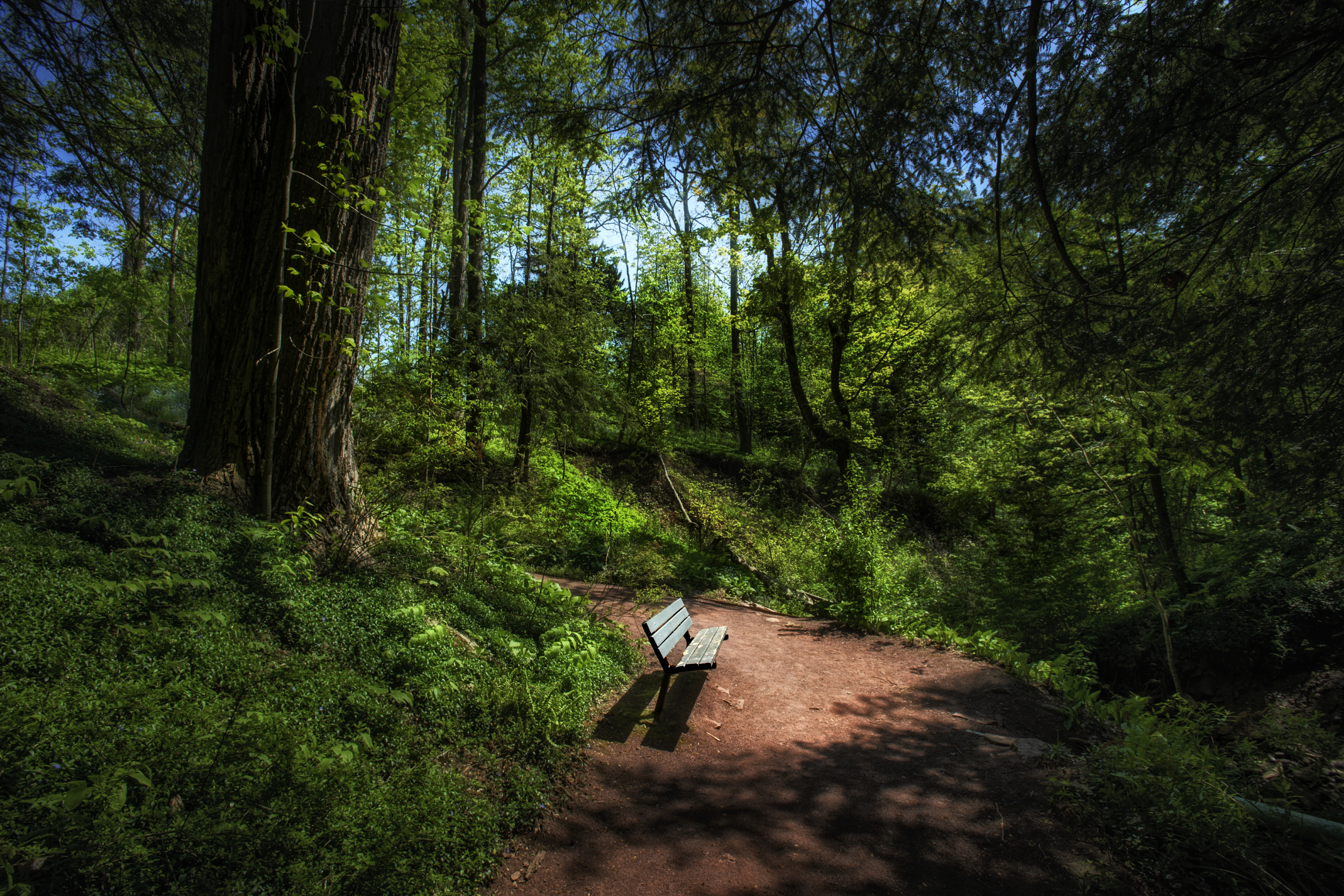
A restful spot in the Root Glen

=== The Root Glen ===
The Root Glen is a wooded garden located on the premises of Hamilton College. This walking area has been developed over the course of three generations by the Root family. The Root Glen comprises both formal gardens and forest trails.

Adjacent to the Root Glen stands the Homestead, a building acquired and named by Oren Root in the 1850s. Oren and his wife Grace planted the surroundings of the building with trees, shrubs, and flowers. The property was inherited by Oren's son, Elihu Root, who expanded the gardens. In 1937, Edward Root assumed responsibility for the garden from his father. Following her husband's passing, Grace Root established the Root Glen Foundation with the objective of utilizing the land for educational purposes and promoting the study of birds. In 1971, the foundation dissolved, and Grace transferred ownership to Hamilton College. The maintenance of the Root Glen is overseen by the college's horticultural grounds staff.

== Academics ==
Hamilton College currently provides the Bachelor of Arts (abbreviated as A.B. or B.A.) degree across 55 fields of study. Additionally, the college participates in dual-degree programs in engineering with the Fu Foundation School of Engineering and Applied Science at Columbia University, as well as the Thayer School of Engineering at Dartmouth College. In April, 2026, Hamilton announced 4+1 Bachelors and master's degree partnerships with Washington University in St. Louis (engineering), the University of Pennsylvania Graduate School of Education, and the University of Chicago (arts, humanities, and sciences). In June, 2026, Hamilton added graduate partnerships with Harvard Graduate School of Education, Vanderbilt University's Owen Graduate School of Management, and Duke University's Fuqua School of Business. Among the graduates in 2021, the most popular majors were Economics (81), Biology/Biological Sciences (39), and Political Science and Government (34).

While students are required to fulfill the courses for their chosen concentration, they have flexibility in selecting their other courses. Students must complete a quantitative and symbolic reasoning requirement, which can be satisfied through various departmental courses. Additionally, a writing requirement must be met, necessitating enrollment in at least three writing-intensive courses.

Hamilton College was featured on the U.S. News "Top 100 - Lowest Acceptance Rates" list published in 2024. Hamilton College is often referred to as one of the Little Ivies.

Since 2002, Hamilton College has been involved in the SAT optional movement for undergraduate admissions.

=== Admissions ===
In the application cycle for the Class of 2027, Hamilton College received 9,643 applications and extended offers to 1,135 students, resulting in an acceptance rate of 11.8%. The Class of 2027 represents 45 states and 25 countries. As of the 2023–24 academic year, Hamilton College enrolls students from 47 states and 54 countries.

== Financial aid ==
For the 2023–24 academic year, Hamilton College has established a total direct cost of $82,430. This includes specific amounts allocated to different categories, such as $65,090 for tuition, $9,120 for housing, $7,570 for food, and $650 for a student activity fee. Additionally, the college includes budgetary allowances of $800 for books and supplies, $1,000 for miscellaneous personal expenses, and $1,800 for travel expenses. These additional expenses are classified as non-direct costs.

Hamilton College is committed to meeting 100% of demonstrated financial need for its students. Financial aid is provided to nearly half of all Hamilton students each year. On average, financial aid awards amount to $53,597 and may include various forms of assistance such as scholarships, student loans, and work-study opportunities.

Hamilton College practices a needs-blind admission policy for U.S. citizens, meaning that the student's capability to afford tuition fees is not taken into consideration during the admissions evaluation process. The college has a wide range of endowed scholarships, which account for 40% of their scholarship budget of nearly $46 million.

== Rankings ==
Academic rankings

Liberal arts
- U.S. News & World Report: 14
- Washington Monthly: 29

National
- Forbes: 66
- WSJ/College Pulse: 58

According to the annual ranking for 2021 conducted by U.S. News & World Report, Hamilton College is categorized as "most selective" in admissions. The college is tied for ninth overall and tied for 28th in the category of "Best Undergraduate Teaching" among "National Liberal Arts Colleges". Forbes ranked Hamilton College 66th in its 2024–25 ranking of America's Top 500 Colleges. Among liberal arts colleges, Hamilton College was ranked 15th. In 2024, Washington Monthly ranked Hamilton College 29th among 194 liberal arts colleges in the U.S. based on its contribution to the public good, as measured by social mobility, research, and promoting public service.

In the 2019 ranking by Kiplinger's Personal Finance, Hamilton College secured the 11th position among the best-value liberal arts colleges in the United States.

== Student life and traditions ==
=== Housing ===
Most students at Hamilton College reside in college-owned dormitories. The residence halls encompass a range of styles, including repurposed fraternity houses, suites, apartment-style housing, cooperative living, and traditional dormitory-style accommodations. While all residence halls are mixed-gender, some may have separate floors designated for a specific sex. In October 2010, the college implemented a gender-neutral housing policy, allowing students of any gender to share rooms designated for two or more occupants.

=== Campus media ===
WHCL-FM is a radio station at Hamilton College that airs a range of programming, including music, news, sports, and talk shows. Broadcasting at FM frequency 88.7, the station can be accessed by residents of the Mohawk Valley region and online at whcl.org.

The Spectator, also referred to as The Spec, is Hamilton College's primary weekly news publication. It is distributed in various campus locations, such as dining halls, the mail center, and the library. The Spectator covers a wide range of topics, including campus news, local news, national news, Hamilton sports, and campus life. The Talisman, an early literary magazine, was published between 1832 and 1834, while The Radiator, considered the precursor to The Spectator, emerged in 1848. The Radiator featured short stories, historical sketches, poetry, and news excerpts from both domestic and international sources. The Hamiltonian, the college yearbook, was first published in 1858. The Hamilton Literary Monthly, a literary journal, began its publication in 1866. The Campus, published from 1866 to 1870, was followed by Hamilton Life in 1899. In 1942, Hamilton Life transitioned into Hamiltonews, and in 1947, it became The Spectator.

=== Athletics ===
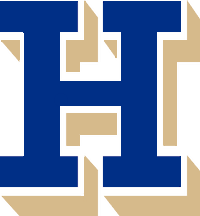
Official Athletics logo

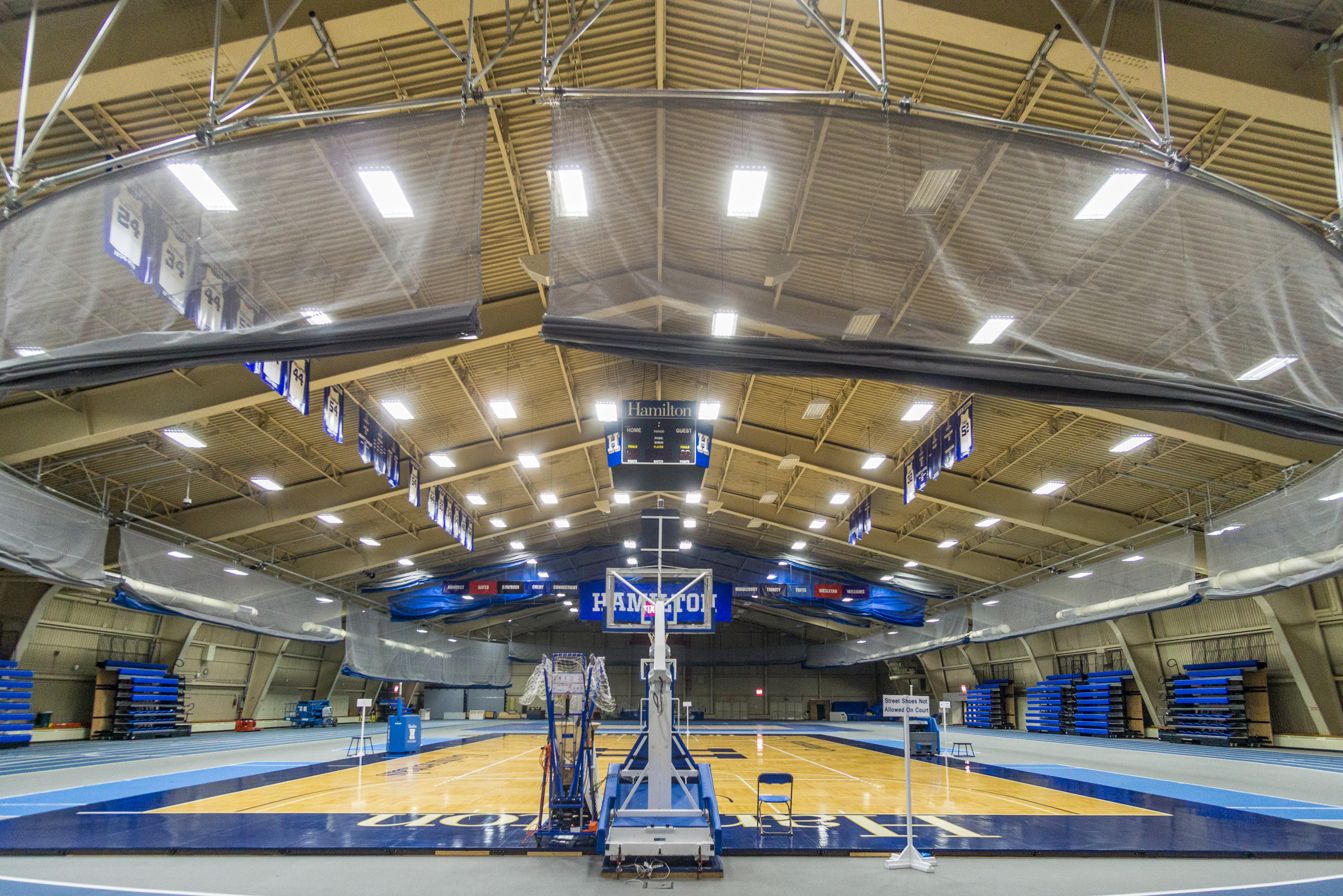
Hamilton's basketball court at Margaret Bundy Scott Field House

Approximately 35% of Hamilton's student body engages in varsity athletics. Alongside varsity sports, Hamilton also supports a range of club and intramural sports. Club sports include alpine skiing, curling, equestrian, figure skating, men's rugby, women's rugby, tae kwon do, ultimate frisbee (Hot Saucers), and women's golf. In 2008, Hamilton's Women's Lacrosse team won the school's first-ever national title in any sport. In 2026, this was followed by the Men's Hockey team winning its first-ever national championship. Hamilton's men's rugby team achieved fourth place in the national Division III tournament in 2008.

One of Hamilton's long-standing football rivalries is with Middlebury College, dating back to 1911 and known as the Rocking Chair Classic.

== Demographics ==
Hamilton College typically enrolls approximately 1,900 students, with 47% being male and 53% female as of 2019. Around 60% of students originate from public schools, while the remaining 40% come from private schools. The student body in 2019 represented 45 U.S. states and 46 countries.

== Media ==
The movie The Sterile Cuckoo was filmed in part at or near Hamilton, and more than a hundred Hamilton students appeared as extras.

== Alumni and faculty ==
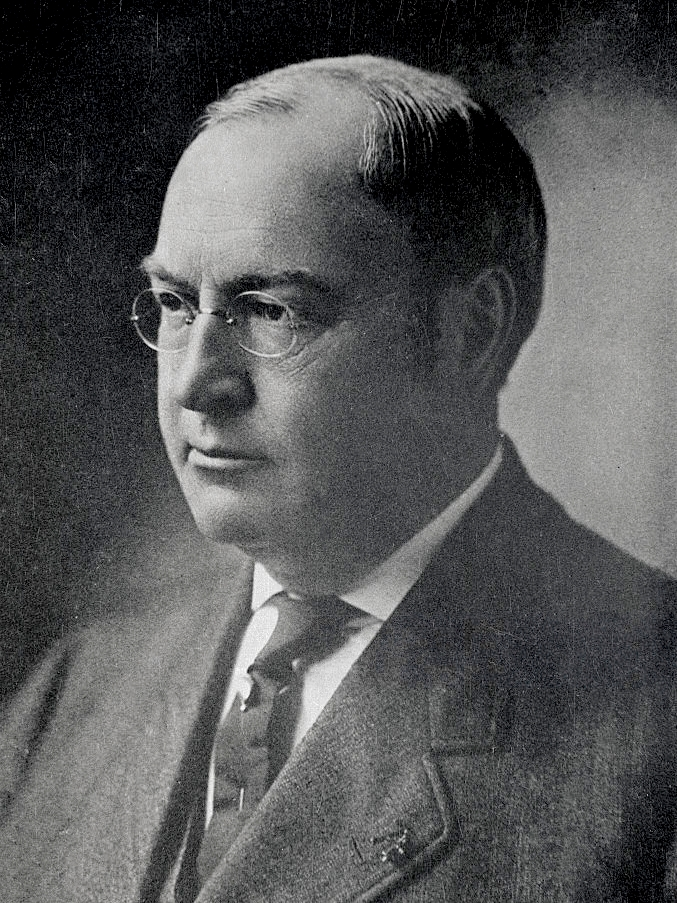
James S. Sherman, former Vice President of the United States

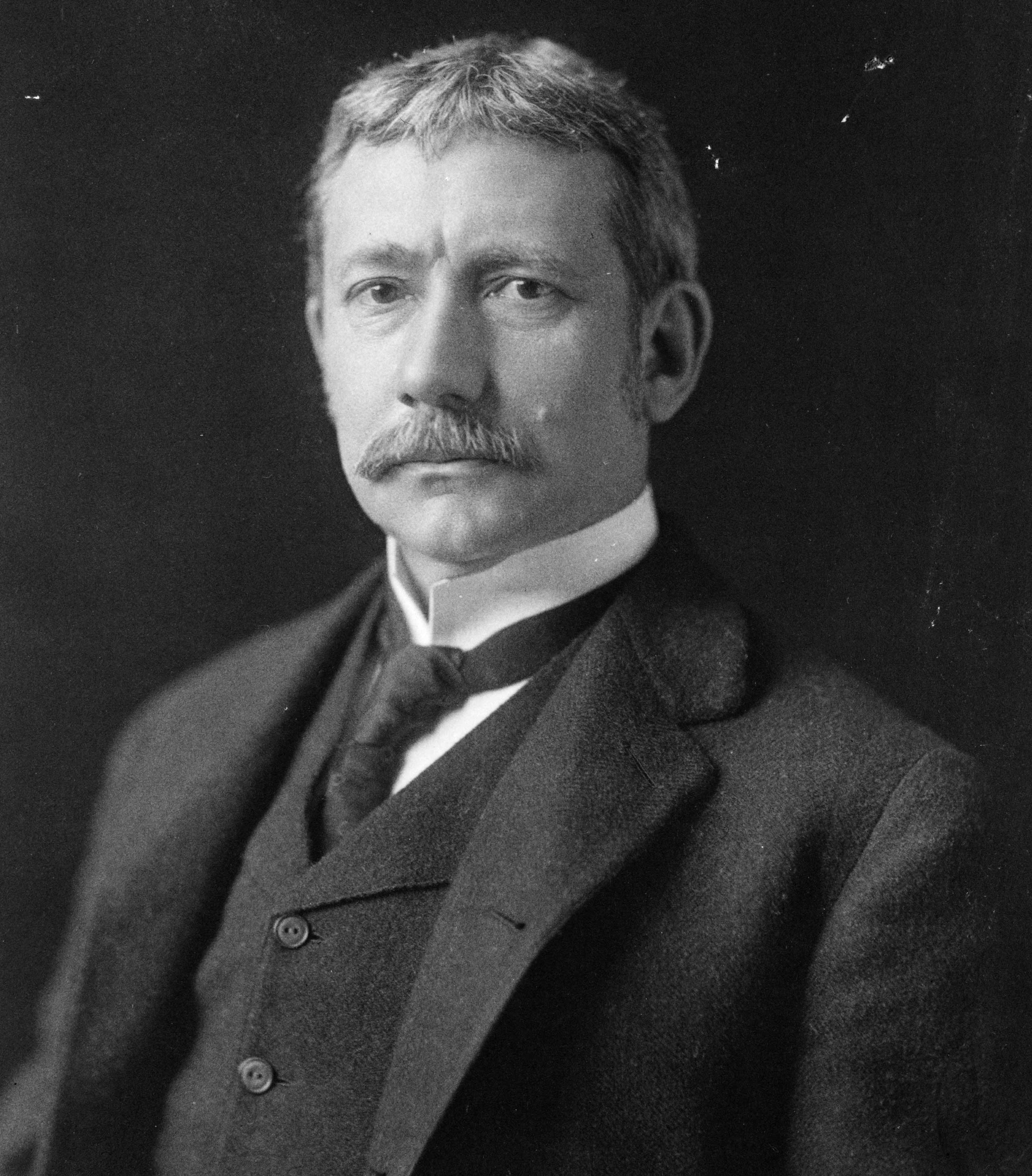
Elihu Root, former United States Secretary of State and winner of the Nobel Peace Prize

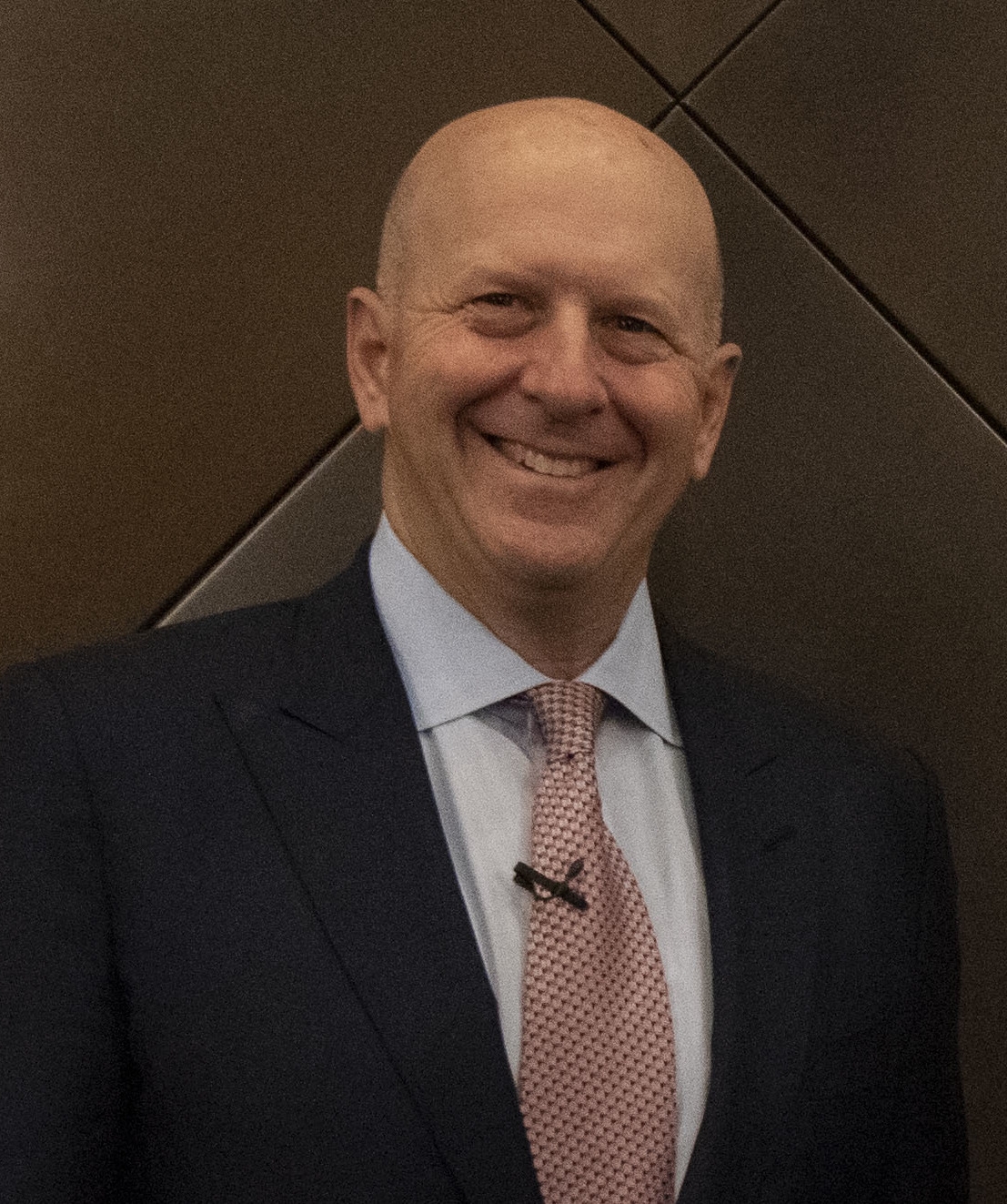
David M. Solomon, CEO of Goldman Sachs

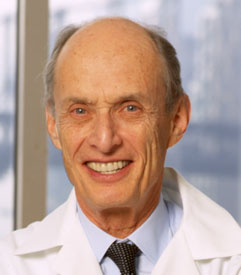
Paul Greengard, Nobel Prize-winning neuroscientist

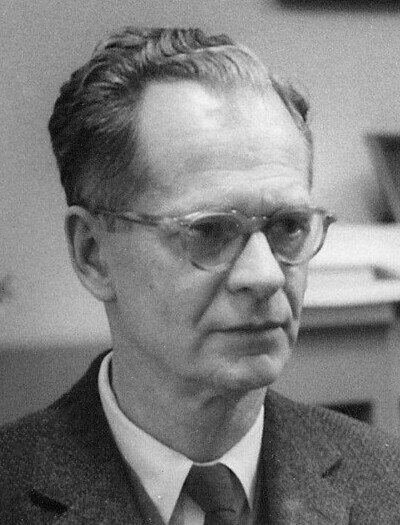
B. F. Skinner, pioneer of modern behaviorism

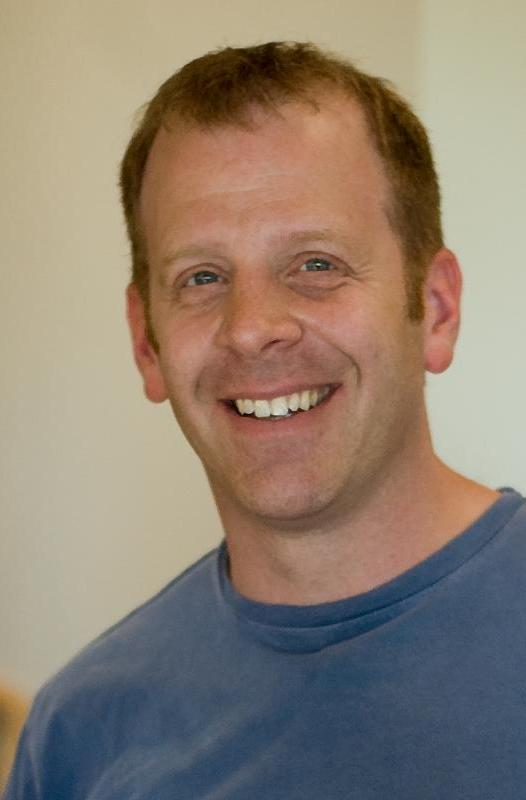
Paul Lieberstein, writer and actor famous for depicting Toby Flenderson on NBC's The Office

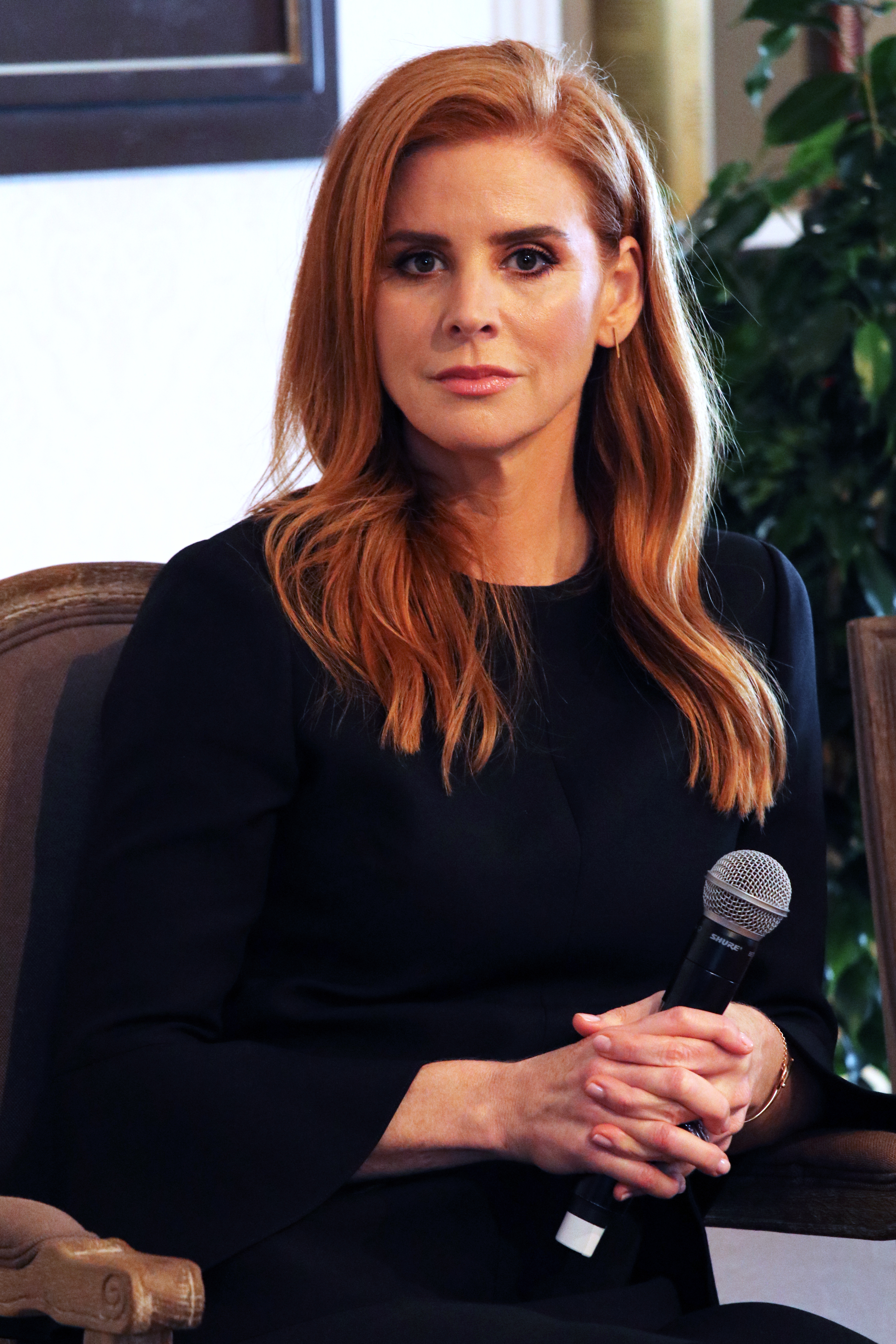
Sarah Rafferty, actress known for her role as Donna Paulsen on the USA Network legal drama Suits

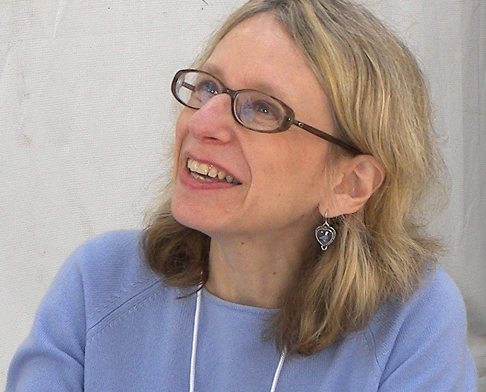
Roz Chast, staff cartoonist for The New Yorker listed by Comics Alliance as one of twelve women cartoonists deserving of lifetime achievement recognition
