= William H. Moore House =

Commercial building in Manhattan, New York

- U.S. National Register of Historic Places
- New York State Register of Historic Places
- New York City Landmark
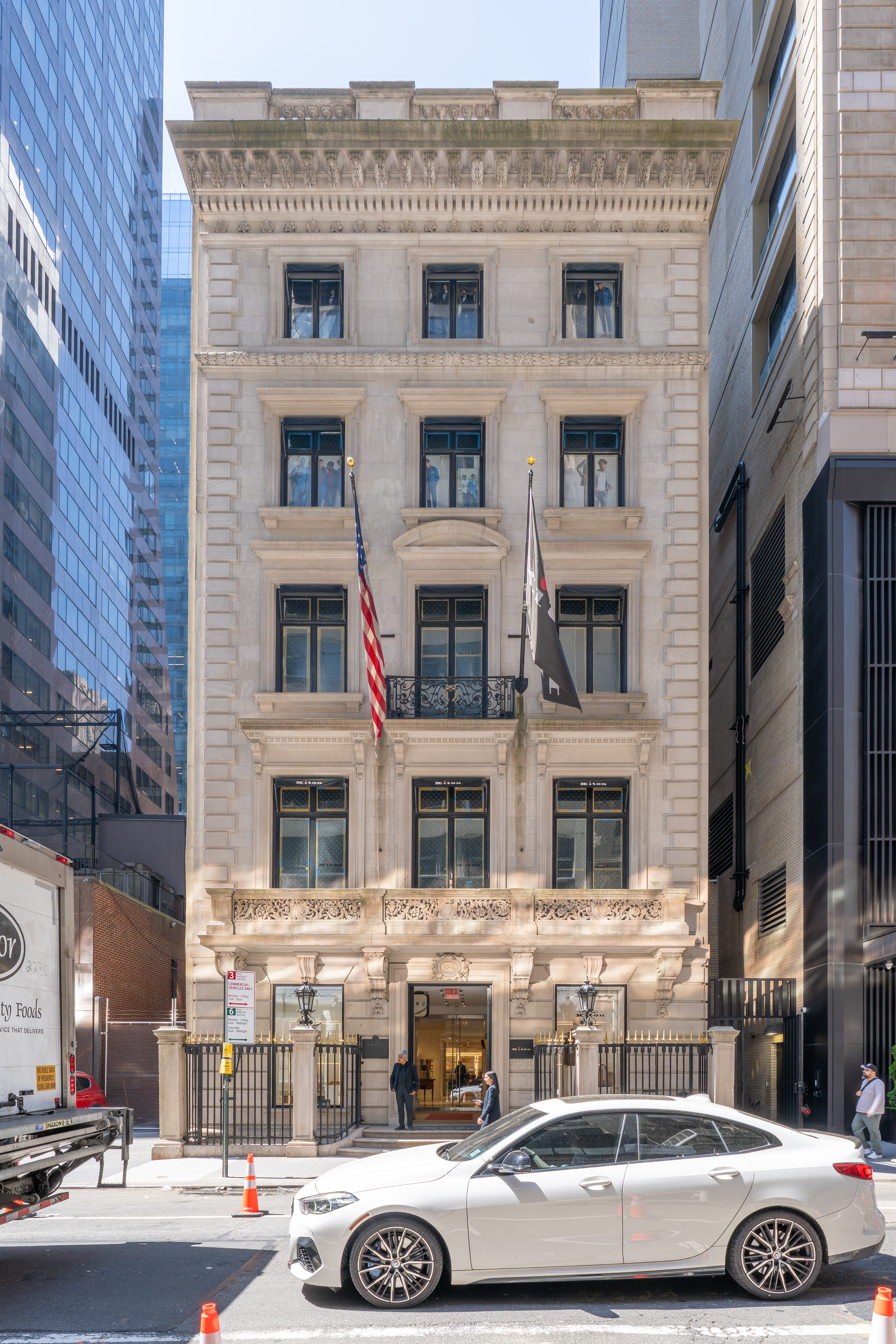
- (2026)
- Location: 4 East 54th Street, Manhattan, New York
- Coordinates: 40°45′38″N 73°58′30″W
- Area: less than one acre
- Built: 1898–1900
- Architect: McKim, Mead & White
- Architectural style: Renaissance
- NRHP reference No.: 72000878
- NYSRHP No.: 06101.001719
- NYCL No.: 0273

Significant dates
- Added to NRHP: March 16, 1972
- Designated NYSRHP: June 23, 1980
- Designated NYCL: January 11, 1967

The William H. Moore House, also known as the Stokes-Moore Mansion and 4 East 54th Street, is a commercial building in the Midtown Manhattan neighborhood of New York City. It is along 54th Street's southern sidewalk between Madison Avenue and Fifth Avenue. The building was designed by McKim, Mead & White and constructed between 1898 and 1900 as a private residence.

The house is a six-story, rectangular stone building in the Renaissance Revival style. It has an English basement on the first floor, which is clad with rusticated blocks of the stone. There is a balustrade and overhanging cornice above the fifth floor. A sixth floor, recessed from the street, was added in the 1990s.

The house was commissioned by developer William Earle Dodge Stokes and purchased by financier William Henry Moore before its completion. Although William H. Moore died in the mansion in 1923, his wife Ada resided in the house until her death in 1955. Afterward, the house contained offices for organizations and companies such as the America-Israel Cultural Foundation and the Banco di Napoli, as well as a store for fashion company Kiton. The New York City Landmarks Preservation Commission designated 4 East 54th Street as an official landmark in 1967, and it was added to the National Register of Historic Places on March 16, 1972.

== Site ==
The William H. Moore House is at 4 East 54th Street in the Midtown Manhattan neighborhood of New York City. It is on the south side of 54th Street between Madison Avenue to the east and Fifth Avenue to the west. The land lot covers 3,615 square feet (335.8 m^{2}) with a frontage of 36 feet (11 m) on 54th Street and a depth of 100.42 feet (30.61 m). Nearby sites include the residences at University Club of New York and The Peninsula New York to the northwest; Aeolian Building and the St. Regis New York hotel to the north; 19 East 54th Street to the east; Saint Thomas Church and 666 Fifth Avenue to the southwest; and Paley Park one block south.

Fifth Avenue between 42nd Street and Central Park South (59th Street) was relatively undeveloped through the late 19th century. The surrounding area was once part of the common lands of the city of New York. The Commissioners' Plan of 1811 established Manhattan's street grid with lots measuring 100 feet (30 m) deep and 25 feet (7.6 m) wide. Upscale residences were constructed around Fifth Avenue following the American Civil War. The block of East 54th Street from Fifth to Madison Avenues was only sporadically developed until the late 1870s, and it had brownstone residences by 1886. Residents of the block included socialite Minnie E. Young at 19 East 54th and merchant John R. Platt at 7 East 54th. On the next block west were the residences of John D. Rockefeller at 4 West 54th, John D. Rockefeller Jr. at 10 West 54th, and Philip Lehman at 7 West 54th.

== Architecture ==
4 East 54th Street is designed in the Italian Renaissance Revival style by McKim, Mead & White. The building is clad with stone and is structurally supported by masonry-bearing walls. It is five stories tall, with the ground story treated as an English basement. The original facade is divided horizontally into three sections: the ground-floor English basement, the three center stories, and the fifth-story attic. Russell Sturgis, writing for Architectural Record in 1900, described 4 East 54th Street as "tranquil, simple, and not ineffective", but he thought that the balcony outside the second floor should have been placed at a greater height.

=== Facade ===
The facade is made of white limestone. The main facade on 54th Street is five stories tall with three bays of vertical openings. The first story is faced with rusticated stone blocks, and it contains flat-arched display windows on the left and right bays, topped by keystones with volutes. The main entrance is through the center bay and has a carved cartouche above it. A balcony runs across the bottom of the second story. The keystones on the left and right windows, as well as four additional console brackets, support the balcony.

The second through fifth stories facing 54th Street each contain three rectangular windows, which are surrounded by increasingly simple moldings on higher floors. These stories are mostly clad with flat stone, but the extreme ends of the facade contain rusticated quoins. Above the second story are individual cornices supported by brackets. The center window on the third story has a rectangular balcony, with a railing made of carved ironwork, and it is topped by a rounded pediment. The fourth and fifth floors are separated by a horizontal band course with dentils. Above the fifth floor, there is an entablature with dentils and scallop details. There is also a large cornice supported by console brackets. Above the cornice is a balustrade, behind which is the flat roof.

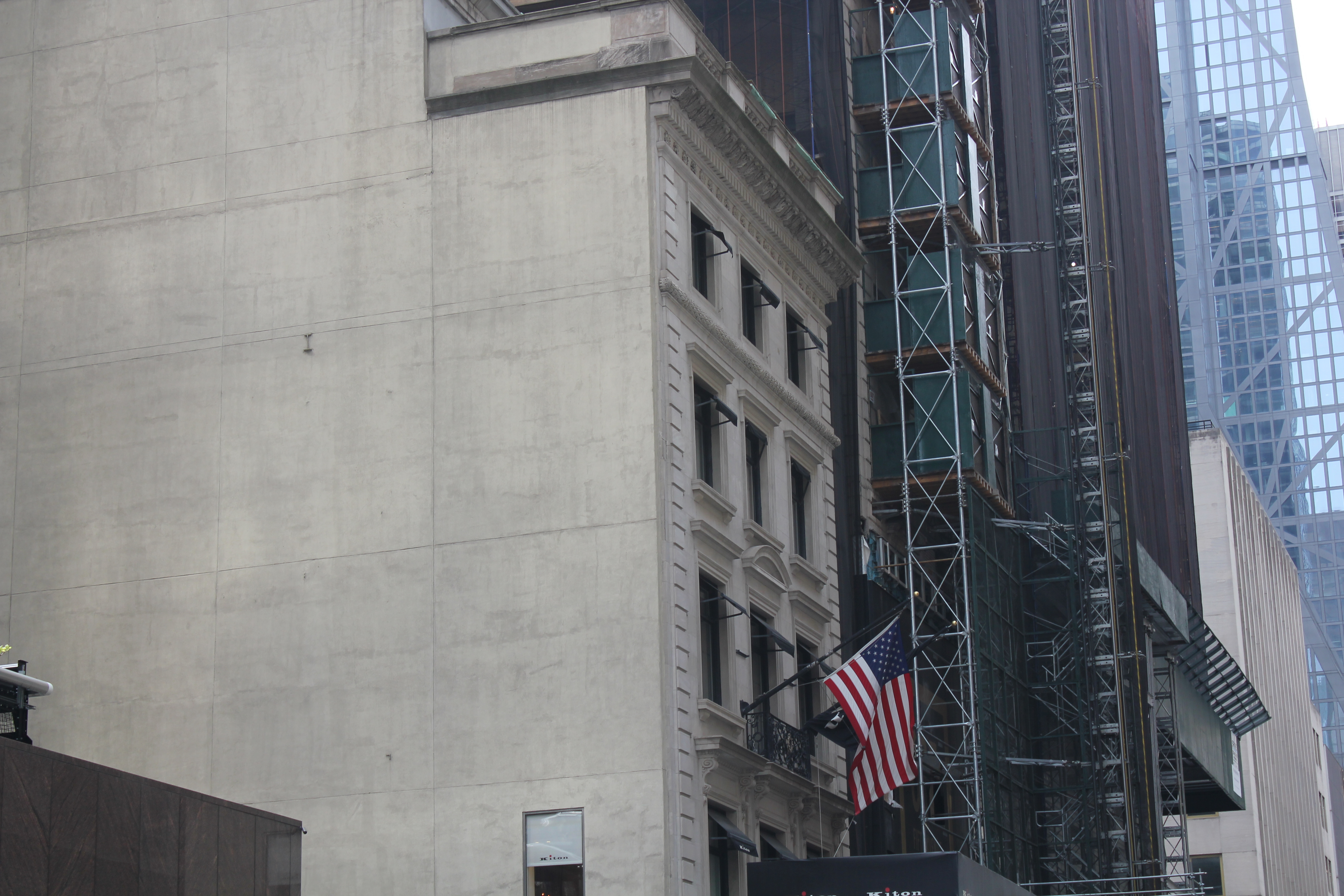
Top of the eastern facade as seen from a distance

The sixth floor, added in the 1990s, was built atop that roof and is not visible from street level. When the house was completed, there had been windows on three sides. The western wall had windows since, at the time of the house's construction, the building did not abut anything to the west.

=== Interior ===
The house has 23,000 square feet (2,100 m^{2}) of space, or 25,971 square feet (2,412.8 m^{2}) according to city records. The interior was outfitted with 21 fireplaces; marble floors, stairs, and pillars; mahogany, oak, and cypress decorative elements; wrought iron fretwork; and stained glass windows. Some of the fireplaces were subsequently removed, and the original lift inside the house was replaced with an elevator.

4 East 54th Street is one of several "American basement plan" residences on 54th Street, where the entrance is placed at ground level, rather than on a stoop slightly above ground as in other rowhouses. This type of design enabled the ground-floor reception area to have a central staircase, rather than on one side. The basement was arranged with a kitchen. The first floor had reception and dining rooms, and it was clad in marble. The reception room was on the left side of the entrance, while an office was to the right. The hallway had marble columns, pilasters, and walls and led to the kitchen. There was a marble fountain in the hallway when the house was used as a residence.

A broad staircase curves up to the second floor, which had drawing rooms and parlors. The second floor's main drawing room, at the front or north end of the house, occupied the entire width of the house. Another hallway and a conservatory separated the main drawing room from other spaces in the house. The conservatory had marble floors, while the other rooms had wooden floors in a herringbone pattern. In the rear was a dining room containing wood-paneled walls and a fireplace with a mantelpiece of green marble. On the third and fourth floors were bedrooms for the family. The third floor had a library at its front and two bedrooms (including a master bedroom) at its rear, decorated with marble shelves. The fourth floor was entirely dedicated to bedrooms, and the fifth floor had bedrooms for the servants.

== History ==
William Earl Dodge Stokes was born in 1852 and helped develop many buildings on the Upper West Side in the late 19th century. His family headed a mining company called Phelps, Dodge & Company. In 1895, Stokes married 19-year-old Rita Hernandez de Alba Acosta after becoming enamored with Rita's picture in a window on Fifth Avenue. The wedding was held at 47 West 48th Street, the Midtown mansion where Rita Acosta's parents Ricardo and Micaela lived. Initially, the couple lived on the Upper West Side. By the late 1890s, many smaller mansions were being developed on side streets near Fifth Avenue in Midtown Manhattan.

=== Residence ===
In June 1898, Caroline S. Reed sold two rowhouses at 4 and 6 East 54th Street for about $140,000. The buyer's name was initially not publicized, but William Stokes hired McKim, Mead & White to design a five-story brick-and-stone residence on the site shortly after the sale. The original plans for the house were announced that June, when the house was projected to cost $100,000. The next month, William Stokes decided to instead erect a limestone-clad house. William Stokes had specifically planned the house for his wife: a short article in The Sun, published in October 1898, stated that William and Rita Stokes "expect to move into their new house at 4 East Fifty-fourth Street on Jan. 16". The marriage was short; by mid-1899 Rita Stokes had filed for divorce, with the proceedings finalized by the finalized the following April.

The house had not been completed when, in December 1899, William Stokes sold it to financier William Henry Moore, who paid either $225,000 or $325,000. William and his wife Ada temporarily lived in the Holland House until the following March, when the house was completed. In 1901, the Moores signed an agreement with Charles W. Harkness regarding an "encroachment" onto Harkness's adjacent property at 2 East 54th Street (685 Fifth Avenue). As of the 1910 United States census, the residents included not only the Moores but also nine servants, eight of whom were immigrants from Scotland, Sweden, Finland, and Ireland. William's grandson Paul Moore Jr., a bishop of the Episcopal Church, recalled that the house was filled with "Persian rugs, Victorian furniture, etc."

William H. Moore died at the house on January 11, 1923. His estate was divided equally between Ada, who continued to live at the house, and the couple's two sons, who lived elsewhere. After William Moore's death, Ada used the house for several events, such as a pre-Lent lecture, a tea for the Society of Woman Geographers, and a reception for Metropolitan Opera singers. As the neighborhood became more commercial in nature, the Stork Club restaurant opened directly behind the house. Paul Moore Jr. recalled that his grandmother's butler called the Stork Club's owner Sherman Billingsley regularly to complain about the noise from the restaurant. Ada Moore died at the house on January 30, 1955.

=== Late 20th century ===
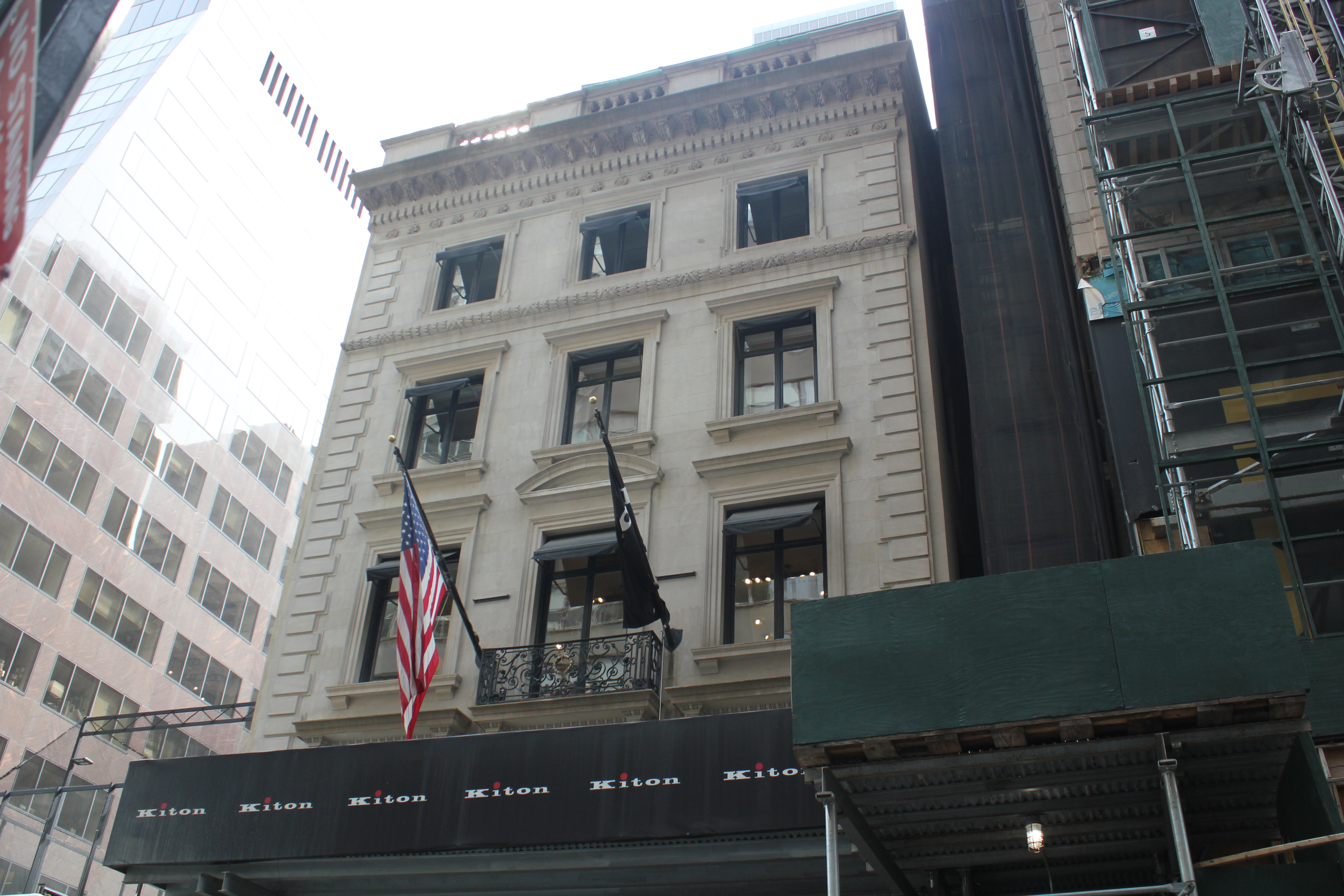
Upper facade details

Harry and Sydney W. Waxman, builders from the company Waxman Brothers, purchased the house in May 1960 from Ed Benenson. The buyers were planning to convert the building to a headquarters of the Waxman Foundation, a charity, for $1 million. The renovations included air-conditioning and a new elevator. The Waxman Brothers had moved into the house by July 1960, when the company formed a new mortgage firm, the Jefferson Funding Corporation, with offices in the building.

The America-Israel Cultural Foundation (AICF), a group founded by violinist Isaac Stern, acquired the house in 1966 and converted the building into its headquarters. An arts-and-crafts center and an Israeli-art gallery were placed on the ground floor. The second floor had a reception foyer, a lecture/film room, and a board room. The AICF headquarters opened in February 1966. The New York City Landmarks Preservation Commission (LPC) designated the house as a landmark on January 11, 1967. Under AICF ownership, the house was known as the America-Israel Culture House. It hosted events such as an exhibit of artifacts from the "Land of the Bible", a reception for Batsheva Dance Company performers, a series of photographs about the 1948 Arab–Israeli War, and a display of modern and ancient jewelry. 4 East 54th Street was listed on the National Register of Historic Places on March 16, 1972.

Joseph P. Famolare purchased the house in 1978 for use as the headquarters for his company Famolare Shoes. Famolare had initially intended to demolish the interior to make way for "white walls and sleek-looking insides". Famolare discussed the renovation with his tax lawyer, who said he may be eligible for a tax credit if he preserved the interior, leading him to replace his architects. The mahogany and stained glass interiors were thus retained, becoming Famolare Shoes' sales offices and showrooms. Among the company's customers was Isaac Stern. Famolare sold the house to Four East Fifty-fourth Street Associates in 1984, and the house was transferred the next year to the government of Indonesia. By 1986, the house was known as the Indonesian Pavilion. That year, the government of Indonesia opened a furniture store called Sarinah on the lowest three floors; this was the Indonesian government's first store outside Indonesia.

The Italian bank Banco di Napoli purchased the building for $12.8 million from the Indonesian government in May 1993. The bank renovated the building and added the sixth floor for $7 million. The renovation was planned by SCR Design, which had proposed constructing two floors. Because the house was a city landmark, the LPC had to determine whether the additional floors were allowed to be developed, even though the proposed exterior design was similar to the original five floors. The LPC also had to approve a proposed fire stair in the side yard. Christopher Gray of The New York Times said the addition "completely negates any suggestion that the building is any longer a mansion but it is in no way offensive".

=== 21st century ===
After Banco di Napoli was acquired in Sanpaolo IMI Bank in 2000, it placed the building for sale in 2001 for $28.5 million. In late 2002, Italian fashion company Kiton bought the house for $25 million. The company's chairman, Antonio de Matteis, said that company officials had admired the house, visible from their office at the Aeolian Building across the street, for several years. The company planned to use the first floor for men's clothing and the front of the second floor for women's clothing. At the same time, the rear of the second floor was to be used for custom-fitted menswear. The upper stories would be used for wholesaling, but Banco di Napoli had installed partition walls there, which Kiton planned to remove. As of 2021, the building was still owned by Kiton.

== See also ==
- List of New York City Designated Landmarks in Manhattan from 14th to 59th Streets
- National Register of Historic Places listings in Manhattan from 14th to 59th Streets
