= Theodore Chanler =

American composer

Theodore Ward Chanler
- Born: April 29, 1902; Newport, Rhode Island
- Died: July 27, 1961 (aged 59); Boston, Massachusetts
- Education: Institute of Musical Art; Cleveland Institute of Music; Oxford University
- Spouse: Maria de Acosta Sargent (m. 1931)
- Parent(s): Winthrop Astor Chanler; Margaret Ward Terry
- Relatives: See Astor family
- Awards: Guggenheim fellowship

Theodore Ward Chanler (April 29, 1902 – July 27, 1961) was an American composer.

== Early life ==
Chanler was born on April 29, 1902, in Newport, Rhode Island. He was a son of Major Winthrop Astor Chanler and Margaret Ward (née Terry) Chanler, an author and musician. Theodore's godfather was President Theodore Roosevelt, who attended his christening in Newport in 1902. Though born in Newport, his family shortly moved to Geneseo, New York, where he grew up at the family estate, Sweet Briar Farms.

His paternal grandparents were Margaret Astor (née Ward) Chanler (1838–1875), a member of the Astor family, and John Winthrop Chanler (1826–1877), a U.S. Representative from New York. His maternal grandparents were Louisa (née Ward) Crawford Terry and artist Luther Terry (d. 1900). (Note: Her mother was the widow of sculptor Thomas Crawford, who died in 1857, and with whom she had four children including F. Marion Crawford and Mary Crawford Fraser.) His grandmother was a half-sister of F. Marion Crawford and a niece of Julia Ward Howe.

Chanler studied piano while a youngster in Boston, and then studied piano under Buhling and counterpoint under Goetschius at the Institute of Musical Art in New York City. From 1920 to 1923, he studied at the Cleveland Institute of Music, and between 1924 and 1927 in Europe (Oxford, then Paris under Nadia Boulanger).

== Career ==
He became a music critic for the Boston Herald in 1934, and taught in Massachusetts in the 1940s and 1950s. He was also a regular contributor to the American magazine Modern Music.

Chanler's best-known works are his songs, which number about 50. He also composed a ballet, an opera (The Pot of Fat, 1955), choral pieces, works for chamber ensemble, and piano solo pieces. In 1940, he was awarded the League of Composers Town Hall Award for his song cycle, "Four Rhymes from Peacock Pie" and, in 1944, was the recipient of a Guggenheim fellowship.

=== Teaching career ===
From 1945 to 1947, he was on the faculty of the Peabody Conservatory in Baltimore. He also taught at the Longy School of Music of Bard College in Cambridge, Massachusetts.

== Personal life ==
In Paris in 1931, Chanler was married to Maria Sargent (née de Acosta) (1880–1970), the daughter of Ricardo de Acosta. She was the sister of Aida de Acosta, Mercedes de Acosta, Rita de Acosta, and Mrs. Frederick Shaw of London. Maria previously was married to Andrew Robeson Sargent, the son of Charles Sprague Sargent. Maria and Andrew had a child together, Ignatius Sargent (1914–1999), who attended the Groton School and was a member of the class of 1937 at Harvard University. He married Frances Moffat in 1935.

Chanler died at the Massachusetts General Hospital in Boston on July 27, 1961.
