= List of Sigma Phi members =

Sigma Phi is an American collegiate fraternity. It was founded in 1827 at Union College in Schenectady, New York. Following is a list of some of its notable members.

== Art and architecture ==
Name	Chapter	Notability	Ref.
Bradford Perkins	Wisconsin, Cornell	Architect and founder of Perkins Eastman Architects	
Montgomery Schuyler	Hobart	architect and influential architecture critic in New York City	
Philip Will Jr.	Cornell	Architect, co-founder of architecture firm Perkins&Will, and president of the American Institute of Architects	

== Business ==
Name	Chapter	Notability	Ref.
J. Patrick Doyle	Michigan	former CEO of Domino's Pizza	
Seth Flowerman	Cornell	Entrepreneur, CEO of PLT Health Solutions	
Leonard Jerome	Union	American financier and the maternal grandfather of Winston Churchill	
Charles F. Knight	Cornell	chairman and CEO of Emerson Electric	
James M. Loree	Union	CEO of Stanley Black & Decker	
Charlie Munger	Michigan	former vice-chairman of Berkshire Hathaway	
Peter Busch Orthwein	Cornell	founder and chairman of Thor Industries	
Howard Potter	Union	American industrialist, investment banker, diplomat and philanthropist, and a partner in Brown Bros. & Co.	
Ratan Tata	Cornell	businessman and former chairman of Tata Sons	
Jay Walker	Cornell	founder of Priceline	

== Education ==
Name	Chapter	Notability	Ref.
Mortimer Elwyn Cooley		professor of Mechanical Engineering at the University of Michigan, mechanical and consulting engineer	
George W. Eaton	Union	president of Colegate University and Madison University	
Stephen Gilman	Princeton	Hispanist, Guggenheim Fellow, professor at Harvard University, Ohio State University, and Princeton University	
George Wheeler Hinman	Hamilton	president of Marietta College, publisher of the Chicago Herald and Examiner, editor and manager of Chicago Inter Ocean	
Oren Root II	Hamilton	professor of mathematics and natural sciences at Hamilton College; professor of English at the University of Missouri; Presbyterian minister	
William A. Shanklin	Hamilton	president of Upper Iowa University and Wesleyan University, Methodist minister	
M. Woolsey Stryker	Hamilton	president of Hamilton College and Presbyterian minister	
Andrew Dickson White	Hobart	co-founder and first president of Cornell University, U.S. Ambassador to Germany	
William Dwight Whitney	Williams	linguist, professor at Yale University, and first president of the American Philological Association	

== Entertainment ==
Name	Chapter	Notability	Ref.
Nat Faxon	Hamilton	Actor, comedian, and Academy Award-winning screenwriter	
Arthur C. Nielsen	Wisconsin	creator of Nielsen ratings	

== Government and public service ==
Name	Chapter	Notability	Ref.
Daniel Butterfield	Union	Assistant Treasurer of the United States, composer of Taps bugle call, Civil War general	
Joel Erhardt	Vermont	police commissioner for the New York Police Department, U.S. Marshal for the Eastern District of New York, and the Collector of the Port of New York	
John Jay Knox Jr.	Hamilton	Comptroller of the Currency of the United States	

== Law ==
Name	Chapter	Notability	Ref.
Douglass Boardman	Hobart	justice of the Supreme Court of New York, Dean of Cornell Law School	
Orsamus Cole	Union	United States Congressman from Wisconsin and 6th Chief Justice of the Wisconsin Supreme Court	
George F. Comstock	Union	Chief Judge of the New York Court of Appeals	
John A. Denison	Vermont	judge of the Supreme Court of Colorado and mayor of Springfield, Massachusetts	
Thomas Nelson	Williams	Chief Justice of Oregon Territory	
Joseph Mullin	Union	justice of the New York Supreme Court, United States Congressman from New York	
James Noxon	Hamilton, Union	Member New York Supreme Court and New York politician	
Abram B. Olin	Williams	Associate Justice of the Supreme Court of the District of Columbia and United States Congressman	
Earl Warren	California	Chief Justice of the United States, Governor of California	

== Literature and journalism ==
Name	Chapter	Notability	Ref.
George Grenville Benedict	Vermont	editor and publisher of The Burlington Daily Free Press, Vermont Senate	
John Bigelow	Union	historian who edited the complete works of Benjamin Franklin, United States Minister to France, and Secretary of State of New York	
Henry Martyn Field	Williams	publisher and editor of The Evangelist	
Chester Sanders Lord	Hamilton	editor of the New York Sun	
Mansfield Tracy Walworth	Union	author	
William Dwight Whitney	Williams	editor-in-chief of The Century Dictionary, linguist, philologist, lexicographer, and first president of the American Philological Association	
Samuel Wilkeson Jr.	Williams	journalist with the New York Times and the New-York Tribune, editor of The Democracy in Buffalo, owner of the Albany Evening Journal	

== Military ==
Name	Chapter	Notability	Ref.
George Grenville Benedict	Vermont	American Civil War hero and Medal of Honor recipient	
Daniel Butterfield	Union	Civil War general, composer of Taps bugle call, and Assistant Treasurer of the United States	
John Cochrane	Union	Brigadier General in the Civil War, United States Congressman from New York, Attorney General of New York	
Henry Rathbone	Union	prominent in the U.S. Army, present in Lincoln's booth at Ford's Theatre; was stabbed tackling John Wilkes Booth	

== Politics ==
Name	Chapter	Notability	Ref.
Samuel W. Beall	Union	Lt. Governor of Wisconsin, Sigma Phi Society founder	
Henry E. Barbour	Union	U.S. Representative from California	
George Grenville Benedict	Vermont	Vermont Senate; editor and publisher of The Burlington Daily Free Press	
John Bigelow	Union	United States Minister to France, Secretary of State of New York, and historian who edited the complete works of Benjamin Franklin	
Thomas Fielder Bowie	Princeton, Union	United States Congressman, founding member of Sigma Phi	
William W. Campbell	Union	United States Congressman from New York	
Clark B. Cochrane	Union	United States Congressman from New York	
John Cochrane	Union	United States Congressman from New York, Attorney General of New York, and Brigadier General in the Civil War	
Orsamus Cole	Union	United States Congressman from Wisconsin and 6th Chief Justice of the Wisconsin Supreme Court	
Archibald B. Darragh	Michigan	U.S. House of Representatives from Michigan	
Thomas Treadwell Davis	Hamilton	United States Congressman from New York	
Ken Dryden	Cornell	Canadian Member of Parliament, former professional hockey player, Hockey Hall of Fame	
Edwin Einstein	Union	United States Congressman from New York	
Charles J. Folger	Hobart	United States Secretary of the Treasury	
Eugene Foss	Vermont	United States House of Representatives and served as a three-term governor of Massachusetts	
A. Oakey Hall	New York	former Mayor of New York	
John F. Hartranft	Union	former Governor of Pennsylvania	
John T. Hoffman	Union	former Governor of New York	
John James Ingalls	Williams	United States Senator from Kansas	
Samuel Knox	Williams	United States Congressman from Missouri	
Addison H. Laflin	Williams	United States Congressman from New York	
Truman A. Merriman	Hobart	United States Congressman from New York	
Joseph Mullin	Union	United States Congressman from New York, justice of the New York Supreme Court	
Abram B. Olin	Williams	United States Congressman from New York and an Associate Justice of the Supreme Court of the District of Columbia	
Andrew Oliver	Union	United States Congressman from New York	
Theodore Otis	Union	politician	
Elihu Root	Hamilton	Canadian Member of Parliament, U.S. Secretary of War, U.S. Secretary of State, Nobel Peace Prize Winner	
Charles B. Sedgwick	Hamilton	United States Congressman from New York	
James S. Sherman	Hamilton	Vice President of the United States and United States Congressman from New York	
Gilbert Carlton Walker	Williams	Governor of Virginia, United States Congressman from Virginia	
Andrew Dickson White	Hobart	U.S. Ambassador to Germany, co-founder and first president of Cornell University	

== Religion ==
Name	Chapter	Notability	Ref.
Charles E. Cheney	Hobart	clergyman and second bishop of the Reformed Episcopal Church	
George William Knox	Hamilton	Missionary in Japan, author, and theologian	
Oren Root II	Hamilton	theologian, Presbyterian minister, college professor	
William A. Shanklin	Hamilton	Methodist minister and university president	
M. Woolsey Stryker	Hamilton	Presbyterian minister and president of Hamilton College	
Lemuel H. Wells	Hobart	first Bishop of the Episcopal Diocese of Spokane	
George Worthington	Hobart	second bishop of Nebraska in the Episcopal Church	

== Science and medicine ==
Name	Chapter	Notability	Ref.
Lewis Sayre	New York	leading American orthopedic surgeon of the 19th century and president of the American Medical Association	

== Sports ==
Name	Chapter	Notability	Ref.
Ken Dryden	Cornell	former professional hockey player, Hockey Hall of Fame, Member of Parliament in Canada	
Larry Tanenbaum	Cornell	chairman of MLSE, owner of the Toronto Raptors and Toronto Maple Leafs	
Ward Wettlaufer	Hamilton	amateur golfer	

== See also ==
- Collegiate secret societies in North America
