= Summer Discovery =

Musiker Discovery Programs
- Industry: Educational camps
- Founded: 1966
- Founder: Mike and Judy Musiker

Summer Discovery, officially known as Musiker Discovery Programs, is an American company that runs pre-college and middle school enrichment programs worldwide. The company is headquartered in Roslyn, New York.

== History ==
Summer Discovery was founded in 1966 when Mike and Judy Musiker founded Musiker Student Tours. Their sons, Bob and Jimmy Musiker, joined the organization in the early 1980s and assumed ownership in 1992. That year, the organization changed names from Musiker Student Tours, Inc. to Musiker Discovery Programs, Inc.

The first Summer Discovery program began at UCLA in 1986. In 2009, Summer Discovery formed a partnership with Jeter's Leaders, awarding scholarships to attend Summer Discovery programs at colleges and universities in the U.S.

In 2010, Summer Discovery partnered with Dream Careers to acquire Career Explorations and form Discovery Internships LLC. In 2020, Summer Discovery ceased offering its Discovery Internships program to focus more on pre-college programs worldwide.

In 2018, Summer Discovery was acquired by Verlinvest, which is now the majority owner of Summer Discovery.

In 2020, Summer Discovery launched Summer Discovery Online in response to the worldwide COVID-19 pandemic. This program partners with universities to provide virtual pre-college courses.

In 2020, Summer Discovery acquired Summer Institute for the Gifted (SIG). Through Summer Institute for the Gifted (SIG), Summer Discovery provides academic summer programs for gifted, academically talented, and creative students ages 5–17.

=== Academic programs ===
Summer Discovery Educational Programs began in 1986 on the campus of UCLA. Two years later Summer Discovery at Cambridge University in England was introduced. Since 1989, the campuses of the University of Michigan, Georgetown University, University of California at Santa Barbara, University of Colorado Boulder, the University of Texas at Austin, University of Pennsylvania, the Wharton School, Hult International Business School in London, Istituto Lorenzo de’Medici in Italy, Shanghai Jiao Tong University in China, and Yale-NUS College in Singapore have been a part of the Summer Discovery campus options.

== Past Programs ==
=== College Discovery ===
The Princeton Review College Discovery Experience is designed to help students choose the college that is best suited for them. During the 2 week summer program, students develop their knowledge of various schools through campus visits and tours run by the school’s admissions office, improve their SAT scores through the Princeton Review SAT Preparation course, and create a personal college admissions profile which includes an application essay.

== Current Programs ==
=== Summer Discovery ===
Summer Discovery offers 2 – 6 week pre-college enrichment programs for high school students.
