= Ricardo de Acosta =

Cuban steamship-line executive(1837–1907)

- Born: July 8, 1837; Matanzas, Matanzas Province, Cuba
- Died: August 24, 1907 (aged 70); New York City, U.S.
- Spouse: Micaela Hernández de Alba y de Alba (m. 1871; died 1907)
- Children: 8, including Rita, Aida, Mercedes

Ricardo de Acosta (July 8, 1837 – August 24, 1907) was a Cuban steamship-line executive and sugar refiner.

== Early life ==
Ricardo was born on July 8, 1837, in Matanzas, the capital of the Cuban Matanzas Province (although often written that he was born in Havana). His parents, both Spanish, were Joseph de Acosta and Maria de Acosta.

Acosta spent most of his childhood travelling between Havana and Madrid.

== Career ==
During the Cuban insurrection against Spain, known as the Ten Years' War, Acosta sided with the Cuban rebels, known as the Patriots. Reportedly, he was "arrested and with twenty others was lined up on a cliff to be executed by firing squad," but escaped by jumping into the sea and boarding a nearby American ship headed towards Boston. Once he arrived in Boston, he accepted a position as a Spanish language instructor at Harvard University.

Several years later, Acosta returned to Havana and acquired an interest in the Ward steamship line, which operated ships between New York City, Havana and the Gulf of Mexico. He also invested in a sugar refining business.

== Personal life ==
In 1871, Acosta was married to Micaela Hernández de Alba y de Alba (1853–1921). Micaela, a rich and socially prominent Spanish woman who was reputedly a relation of the Dukes of Alba. She was the only child of Rafael Lino Hernandez y Aloy and Rita Micaela Guadalupe Andrea Juana Hernandez de Alba, and inherited a million dollars. Together, they were the parents of eight children:

- Joaquín Ignacio de Acosta (1871–1886), who died unmarried from an injury to the head during a baseball game.
- Rita Hernandez de Alba de Acosta (1875–1929), who married William Earl Dodge Stokes in 1895. They divorced in 1900 and in 1902 she married secondly Philip Mesier Lydig. They also divorced, and she became engaged to Percy Stickney Grant, but he died before they married.
- Maria Cecelia de Acosta (1880–1970), who married Andrew Robeson Sargent, the son of Charles Sprague Sargent, in 1909. She later married composer Theodore Ward Chanler, a son of Winthrop Astor Chanler.
- Ricardo Miguel de Acosta (1881–1945), a Harvard educated lawyer who married Marie de Zaldo, daughter of Frederic de Zaldo, in 1909. He later married Maebella Wright.
- Aida Marta de Acosta (1884–1962), who became the first woman to fly a powered aircraft solo. In 1908 she married Oren Root IIII, a son of Oren Root II and nephew of Elihu Root. They divorced and in 1927 she married secondly Assistant Secretary of War Henry Skillman Breckinridge.
- Enrique "Henry" Jose de Acosta (1886–1911), who died unmarried.
- Ángela Aloysius de Acosta (1891–1978), who married William Sewall in 1910. They divorced in October 1922 and in November 1922 she married Frederick Charleton Shaw, a younger son of Sir Frederick William Shaw, 5th Bt.
- Mercedes de Acosta (1892–1968), who was an author, a scriptwriter, and a social critic. She married artist Abram Poole in 1920, but is best known as the lover of movie star Greta Garbo.

Acosta died of heart disease on August 24, 1907, in New York City. His funeral was held at St. Patrick's Cathedral in Manhattan. In 1910 his widow was living at 1037 Madison Avenue and in 1920 at 830 Park Avenue. Micaela de Acosta died at their daughter's home in Bedford Hills, New York, in December 1921.
