= Henry Skillman Breckinridge =

American Olympic fencer, lawyer and politician (1886–1960)

- Breckinridge, c. 1913–1916

United States Assistant Secretary of War
- In office May 6, 1913 – February 10, 1916
- President: Woodrow Wilson
- Preceded by: Robert Shaw Oliver
- Succeeded by: William Moulton Ingraham

Personal details
- Born: May 25, 1886 Chicago, Illinois, U.S.
- Died: May 2, 1960 (aged 73) New York City, New York, U.S.
- Resting place: Lexington Cemetery
- Party: Democratic
- Spouses: Ruth Bradley Woodman (m. 1910; div. 1925) Aida de Acosta (m. 1927; div. 1947) Margaret Lucy Smith (m. 1947)
- Relations: See Breckinridge family
- Children: 3
- Parent(s): Joseph Cabell Breckinridge Sr. Louise Ludlow Dudley
- Education: Princeton University; Harvard Law School

Medal record

Men's fencing

Representing United States

Olympic Games
| Bronze medal – third place | 1920 Antwerp | Foil, team |

Henry Skillman Breckinridge (May 25, 1886 – May 2, 1960) was an American lawyer and politician who was a member of the prominent Breckinridge family and served as the United States Assistant Secretary of War from 1913 to 1916. During the Lindbergh kidnapping trial he served as Charles Lindbergh's attorney. Breckinridge opposed the New Deal from the right. As an opponent of President Franklin D. Roosevelt in the 1936 Democratic primaries he polled less than 3 percent of the vote.

== Early life ==
Breckinridge was born in Chicago, on May 25, 1886, to Louise Ludlow Dudley and Joseph Cabell Breckinridge Sr. Among his many siblings was older brother was Joseph Cabell Breckinridge Jr., an officer in the United States Navy in the Spanish–American War who died while serving on the torpedo boat USS Cushing. Another older brother, Scott Dudley Breckinridge, was a physician and fellow Olympian.

Unlike his father's cousin, John Cabell Breckinridge, a Confederate major general and former Vice President of the United States, his father Joseph was a Union Army officer from Kentucky during the American Civil War who served as Inspector General of the Army and was a major general of volunteers in the Spanish–American War.

His paternal grandfather was Robert Jefferson Breckinridge, a Presbyterian minister, politician, public office holder and abolitionist. His maternal grandfather was Ethelbert Ludlow Dudley, a prominent physician in Lexington, Kentucky.

After graduating from Princeton University and Harvard Law School, he began practicing law in Lexington, Kentucky.

== Career ==
In 1913, at the age of 27, he was appointed United States Assistant Secretary of War by President Woodrow Wilson, a fellow Democrat. At the same time, the Assistant Secretary of the Navy was Franklin Roosevelt. In 1914, he was given charge of rescuing Americans trapped in Europe by the outbreak of World War I in August. Observers at the time and historians since gave him poor marks for his sloppy work and disregard of duties. Much more important was Herbert Hoover, an engineer who volunteered to help and took change of operations. In 1916, Breckinridge resigned, along with Secretary Lindley M. Garrison, who was "advocating a larger army in opposition to the President's views." During World War I, he served as commander of a battalion.

He was a member of the US fencing teams at the 1920 and 1928 Summer Olympics, and was captain of the latter. At the 1920 Games, he won a bronze medal in the team foil event.

== New York lawyer ==
After the war, he went to New York City and soon became a prominent attorney. He was president of the Navy League of the United States from 1919 to 1921 and at that time organized the first Navy Day, which was celebrated in 1920. In 1933, he was counsel to the Joint Congressional Committee to Investigate Dirigible Disasters.

In 1934, he ran for U.S. Senator from New York as the nominee of the "Constitutional Party," to oppose Roosevelt's New Deal policy, but polled only 24,000 votes, half as much as the Communist vote, and one eighth as much as the Socialist candidate Norman Thomas.

=== 1936 Democratic primary ===
In the 1936 Democratic primaries, Breckinridge, a strong opponent of the New Deal, was the only serious candidate opposing the highly popular incumbent Roosevelt. FDR was otherwise opposed within the party only by favorite son candidates. Breckinridge's test of the popularity of the New Deal among Democrats failed, as he lost by wide margins. However, in New Jersey, President Roosevelt did not file for the preference vote and lost that primary to Breckinridge. Roosevelt did receive 19% of the vote on write-ins. Roosevelt's candidates for delegate swept the race in New Jersey and elsewhere. In other primaries, Breckinridge's best showing was his 15% in Maryland.

Roosevelt won a total of 4,830,730 votes in all state primaries combined (93.19%) against Breckinridge's 136,407 (2.63%). Breckinridge endorsed Republican nominee Alf Landon against Roosevelt in the general election.

== Personal life ==
Breckinridge was married three times. His first marriage took place on July 7, 1910, to Ruth Bradley Woodman (1888–1941) in Geneva, Switzerland. Ruth was the daughter of Edgar Horace Woodman, a lawyer who served as mayor of Concord, New Hampshire, in 1883 and 1884. Before they divorced in 1925, Ruth and Henry were the parents of two daughters:

- Elizabeth Foster Breckinridge (1911–2005), who married John Stephens Graham (1905–1976), an Assistant Secretary of the Treasury and Commissioner of the Internal Revenue Service.
- Louise Dudley Breckinridge (c. 1916–1934), who was killed, aged 17, when a bullet accidentally discharged from a target rifle she was carrying. At the time of her death, she was a student at Vassar College.

He married for the second time on August 5, 1927, to socialite Aida de Acosta (1884–1962) in Washington, D.C. Aida, the first woman to fly a powered aircraft solo, was a daughter of Cuban emigre Ricardo de Acosta, who was a steamship-line executive and sugar refiner. Before their marriage, Aida was married to Oren Root IIII, a son of Oren Root II and nephew of Elihu Root. In New York, they lived at 455 East 57th Street. After twenty years of marriage and a three-year separation, they divorced in 1947.

Breckinridge married for the third, and final, time on March 27, 1947, to Margaret Lucy Smith (1913–2011), daughter of horticulturist John Raymond Smith of Gloucestershire, England. Together, they lived at 67-38B 190th Lane in Fresh Meadows, Queens, and were the parents of one daughter:

- Madeline Houston Breckinridge.

Breckinridge died at St. Vincent's Hospital in New York City on May 2, 1960.

== Electoral history ==
New York Senate election, 1934

- Royal S. Copeland (Democratic, Incumbent) – 2,046,377 (55.34%)
- Ernest Harold Cluett (Republican) – 1,363,440 (36.87%)
- Norman Thomas (Socialist) – 194,952 (5.27%)
- Max Bedacht (Communist) – 45,396 (1.23%)
- Henry S. Breckinridge (Constitutional) – 24,241 (0.66%)
- William Sheafe Chase (Law Preservation) – 16,769 (0.45%)
- Olive M. Johnson (Socialist Labor) – 6,622 (0.18%)

1936 United States presidential election (Democratic primaries)

- Franklin D. Roosevelt (Incumbent) – 4,830,730 (93.19%)
- Henry S. Breckinridge – 136,407 (2.63%)
- Upton Sinclair – 106,068 (2.05%)
- John S. McGroarty – 61,391 (1.18%)
- Joseph A. Coutremarsh – 39,730 (0.77%)
- Al Smith – 2,974 (0.06%)
- Charles Coughlin – 2,854 (0.06%)
- John Nance Garner – 108 (0.00%)
- William E. Borah – 87 (0.00%)

== See also ==
- List of Princeton University Olympians
