= America-Israel Cultural Foundation =

Nonprofit American organization

America Israel Cultural Foundation
- Founded: 1939
- Type: 501(c)3 nonprofit foundation

The America-Israel Cultural Foundation (AICF) is a non-profit American foundation that supports cultural projects in Israel.

== History ==
The America-Israel Cultural Foundation was established in 1939 to support the growth and development of a Jewish national home. It was originally known as the American Fund for Palestinian Institutions. After the establishment of the State of Israel in 1948, the name was changed to the American Fund for Israeli Institutions, and subsequently re-incorporated as a 501(c)3 nonprofit foundation in the US as its current name, the America-Israel Cultural Foundation.

After initial years of funding the development of Israeli life through capital projects involving agriculture, archeology, culture, law, and numerous other categories, the organization shifted its focus entirely to culture and by 1954 was entirely focused on cultural support. As an early provider of seed money for nearly all of the notable cultural institutions in Israel, including the Israel Philharmonic Orchestra, the Israel Museum, the Batsheva Dance Company and over 600 other institutions, AICF helped establish and maintain the long-standing excellence of Israeli culture throughout the world. In 1961, it gave entertainer Jack Benny an award for his support. The organization was once housed in the William H. Moore House from 1966 until the late 1970s.

In 1977, the AICF created a chapter in Washington, D.C.

Early recipients included Daniel Barenboim, Itzhak Perlman, Daniel Libeskind (for accordion), Pinchas Zukerman, Miriam Fried, Rami Bar-Niv, Yefim Bronfman, and by 2015, over 17,000 young artists had been supported.

The foundation was in danger of closing in the wake of losses caused by the Ponzi scheme run by Bernard Madoff.

Since 2008 AICF has rebuilt, increasing its investments to $2.7 million. They have granted more than 2500 new scholarships and supported more than $8 million in direct support to Israeli culture. They promote Israeli culture internationally featuring Israel's cultural partnerships with more than 100 countries around the world, and are gaining support from a new generation of supporters who believe culture is the key to promoting understanding.

In 2019, in celebration of its 80th anniversary, AICF launched the ICA Awards (Israeli Culture & Arts Awards), to recognize "the most impactful Israeli artists... for their contributions to the global cultural landscape". The inaugural recipients of the award, announced on October 28, 2019, were Hanna Azoulay Hasfari (theater), Ohad Naharin (dance), Ron Leshem (literature), Idan Raichel (music), and Vania Heymann (film).

== See also ==
- List of investors in Bernard L. Madoff Securities
