= Aida de Acosta =

American aviator (1884–1962)

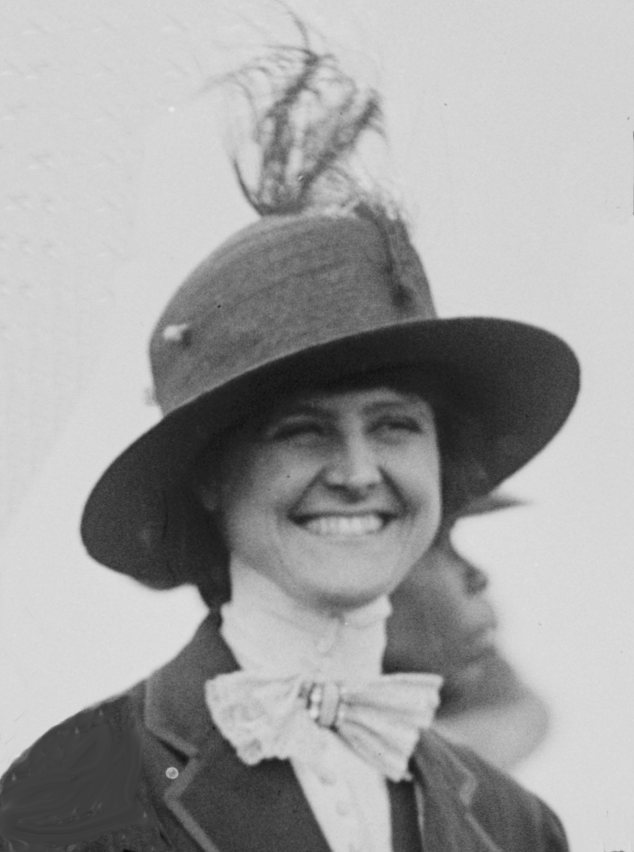
- Born: Aida de Acosta; July 28, 1884; Elberon, New Jersey
- Died: May 26, 1962 (aged 77)
- Other names: Mrs. Oren Root Sr.; Mrs. Henry Breckinridge
- Known for: First woman to fly a powered aircraft solo Founder of first U.S. eye institute Executive director of first U.S. eye bank
- Spouses: Oren Root III (m. 1908; div. 1922) Henry Breckinridge (m. 1927; div. 1947)
- Children: 2
- Parent(s): Ricardo de Acosta; Micaela Hernández de Alba y de Alba
- Relatives: Rita de Acosta Lydig (sister); Mercedes de Acosta (sister)

Aida de Acosta Root Breckinridge (July 28, 1884 – May 26, 1962) was an American socialite and aviator. She was the first woman to fly a powered aircraft solo. In 1903, while in Paris with her mother, she caught her first glimpse of dirigibles. She then proceeded to take only three flight lessons, before taking to the sky by herself.

Later in life, after losing sight in one eye to glaucoma, she became an advocate for improved eye care and was executive director of the first eye bank in America.

== Early life ==
Aida was born in the Elberon section of Long Branch, New Jersey, in 1884 to Ricardo de Acosta, a steamship executive born in Cuba to Spanish parents, and Micaela Hernández de Alba y de Alba, reputedly a descendant of the Alba family, famous in the history of Spain as the Dukes of Alba. Among her seven siblings were the writers and socialites Mercedes de Acosta and Rita de Acosta Lydig.

== The flight ==
On June 27, 1903, in Paris, when Acosta was nineteen, Brazilian pioneer aviator Alberto Santos-Dumont showed her how to operate his personal dirigible, "No. 9." Santos-Dumont was the toast of Paris at the time, flying his dirigible downtown to his favorite restaurant and parking it on the street while he had dinner. Acosta flew Santos-Dumont's aircraft solo from Paris to Château de Bagatelle while Santos-Dumont rode his bicycle along below, waving his arms and shouting advice.

Acosta later recalled that upon her first landing, Santos-Dumont asked her how she had fared. "It is very nice, M. Santos-Dumont," she replied. "Mademoiselle," he cried, "vous êtes la première aero-chauffeuse du monde!" ("Miss, you are the first woman aero-driver in the world!"). She was in fact the first woman to pilot any kind of motorized aircraft, nearly six months before the Wright brothers first flew in a heavier-than-air powered aircraft.

The first flight ended in the polo field at Bagatelle at the northern end of the Bois de Boulogne, during a match between the American team and the British team. Spectators assisted her from the basket. After watching some polo with Santos-Dumont, Acosta climbed back into the basket and flew the machine back to Neuilly St. James, the entire trip lasting one and a half hours.

== Flight aftermath ==
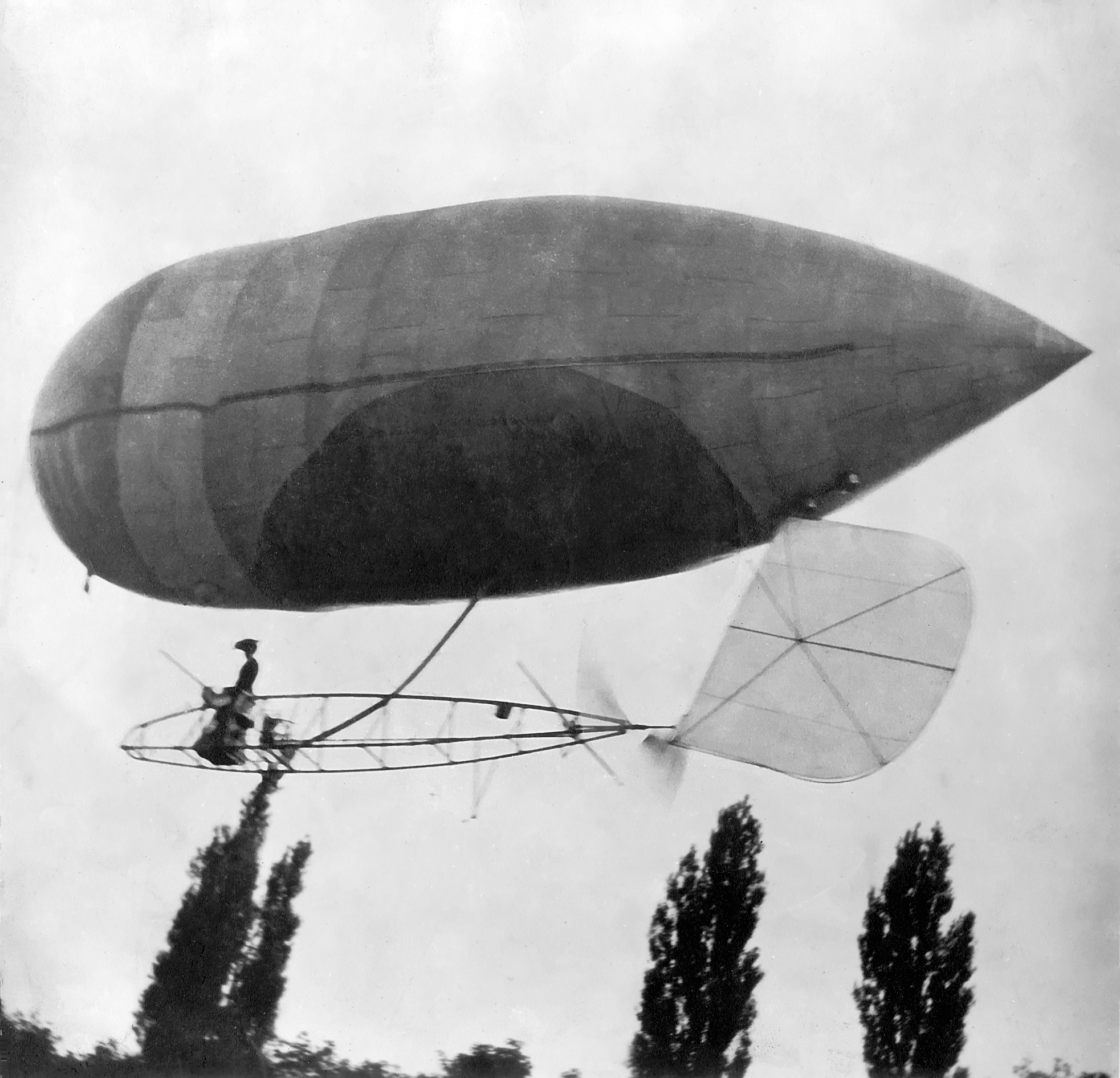
Aida de Acosta flying to a polo match in 1903

Hearing about the flight, her parents were appalled. They were certain that no man would marry a woman who had done such a thing, so they managed to hush it all up until many years later when in the 1930s she recounted the story to her husband and a young naval officer named Lieutenant George Calnan over dinner.

Acosta is the only person that Santos-Dumont ever permitted to fly any of his many aircraft. Also, Santos-Dumont, a lifelong bachelor with no known romantic ties, kept a photograph of Acosta on his desk, next to a vase of fresh flowers, for the rest of his life. Nonetheless, there is no indication that Santos-Dumont and Acosta stayed in touch after her flight. Upon Santos-Dumont's death Acosta was reported as saying that she hardly knew the man.

== Family life ==
Aida de Acosta married:

- Oren Root III, son of Oren Root II and nephew of American statesman and Nobel Peace Prize laureate Elihu Root, in 1908; they divorced in 1922. They had a son, Oren Root IV (1911-1995), and a daughter Alva de Acosta Root (born 1914 and named for suffragette-heiress Alva Belmont).
- Colonel Henry S. Breckinridge, whom she married in 1927 and divorced in 1947. He was attorney to Charles A. Lindbergh during the Lindbergh kidnapping case, and assistant secretary of war under Woodrow Wilson.

== Eye care advocacy ==
In 1922, Aida was afflicted with glaucoma. Her ophthalmologist was famed eye specialist William H. Wilmer, whom Time magazine called "the greatest eye surgeon the U.S. has ever had." She eventually lost sight in one eye, but Dr. Wilmer's care saved her other eye, and inspired her to organize a fund-raising campaign that resulted in $3 million to fund the establishment in 1925 of the Wilmer Eye Institute in Johns Hopkins Hospital, the first eye institute in the U.S. In 1945 she became executive director of the Eye-Bank for Sight Restoration in New York, the first eye bank in the U.S.

== Death ==
She died in Bedford, New York, at the age of 77.

== See also ==
- Hélène Dutrieu
