= United States Congressional Joint Committee to Investigate Dirigible Disasters =

1933 US Congress committee

The Joint Committee to Investigate Dirigible Disasters was created by House Concurrent Resolution 15, 73rd Congress, to investigate the cause of the Akron disaster and the wrecks of other Army and Navy dirigibles and to determine responsibility. The committee was also directed to inquire generally into the question of the utility of dirigibles in military and naval establishments and make recommendations to the Senate and House of Representatives regarding their future use.

The committee was created after the 1933 crash of the U.S.S. Akron, a dirigible designed for the Navy by the Goodyear-Zeppelin Corporation of Akron, Ohio. The U.S.S. Akron made its maiden flight on September 23, 1931. The design of the Akron supposedly had resolved previous safety problems involving rigid airships, but, on April 4, 1933, the Akron crashed just off the coast of New Jersey under stormy conditions. Of the ship's company of 77 officers and men, 74 servicemen, including Rear Admiral William A. Moffett, lost their lives.

Its final report was submitted on June 14, 1933 (Senate Document 75, 73rd Congress, 1st session, Serial 9748). Colonel Henry Breckenridge, former Assistant Secretary of War, served as counsel for the joint committee. Senator William H. King of Utah served as chairman. Representative John J. Delaney of New York was chairman of the subcommittee that gathered the data and facts and arranged a program as to the method of investigation.

== See also ==
- U.S.S. Akron
- List of defunct United States congressional committees
