= William Sheafe Chase =

Canon William Sheafe Chase

Personal life
- Born: 11 January 1858 Amboy, Illinois
- Died: 16 July 1940 (aged 82) Kings Park, New York
- Education: Brown University; Episcopal Divinity School
- Known for: Prohibition advocacy, film censorship reform
- Occupation: Clergyman, social reformer

Religious life
- Denomination: Episcopal
- Church: Christ Church, Brooklyn
- Profession: Rector

William Sheafe Chase (January 11, 1858 - July 16, 1940) was an American Episcopal rector and social reform activist. Born in Amboy, Illinois, he was educated at Brown University and the Cambridge Theological Seminary (now Episcopal Divinity School) before embarking on a long career in the Episcopal Church, most notably as rector of Christ Church in Brooklyn, New York, where he served from 1905 to 1932. Chase became a prominent moral reformer of the early twentieth century, championing causes including Prohibition, Sabbath observance, film censorship, and opposition to birth control. A leading figure in the dry movement alongside Bishop James Cannon Jr. and Wayne Wheeler, he played a significant role in the national debate over alcohol legislation. In his later years he turned his attention to international peace, serving as president of the Religious Union for World Peace.

== Personal life ==
Chase was born in Amboy, Illinois, the son of Newton Simpson Chase and Harriet Peckham. In his early youth his family relocated to Providence, Rhode Island, where he was educated and later graduated from Brown University in 1881. In 1887, Chase married Susan Gladding Collins of Bristol, Rhode Island who died in 1897, leaving Chase a widower. In 1913, Chase became engaged to Rowena Keith Keyes, a teacher at Brooklyn Girls' High School and graduate of Mount Holyoke College, who held a master's degree from Columbia University. She was the daughter of the late Emerson W. Keyes, a Brooklyn lawyer, editor, and author. The engagement was announced from the pulpit of Christ Church by the assistant rector, reportedly to the surprise of the congregation, as the relationship had not been publicly known. However, the marriage does not appear to have taken place, as Chase's 1940 obituary makes no mention of Rowena Keyes. In 1914, Chase married Fannie Louise Jackson. She survived him at his death in July 1940 at their home on Sunken Meadow Road in Kings Park, Long Island. Chase was buried in Bristol, Rhode Island, where he had lived as a young man.

== Electoral history ==
Chase made one foray into electoral politics, running for the New York State Senate in 1934 as the candidate of the Law Preservation Party, a single-issue party organized around the defense of prohibition-era legislation. The campaign was consistent with his decades of activism on behalf of temperance and law enforcement. He was unsuccessful in the race.

New York Senate election, 1934

- Royal S. Copeland (Democratic, Incumbent) – 2,046,377 (55.34%)
- Ernest Harold Cluett (Republican) – 1,363,440 (36.87%)
- Norman Thomas (Socialist) – 194,952 (5.27%)
- Max Bedacht (Communist) – 45,396 (1.23%)
- Henry S. Breckinridge (Constitutional) – 24,241 (0.66%)
- William Sheafe Chase (Law Preservation) – 16,769 (0.45%)
- Olive M. Johnson (Socialist Labor) – 6,622 (0.18%)

== See also ==
- Banned in Boston
