= Rita de Acosta Lydig =

American novelist

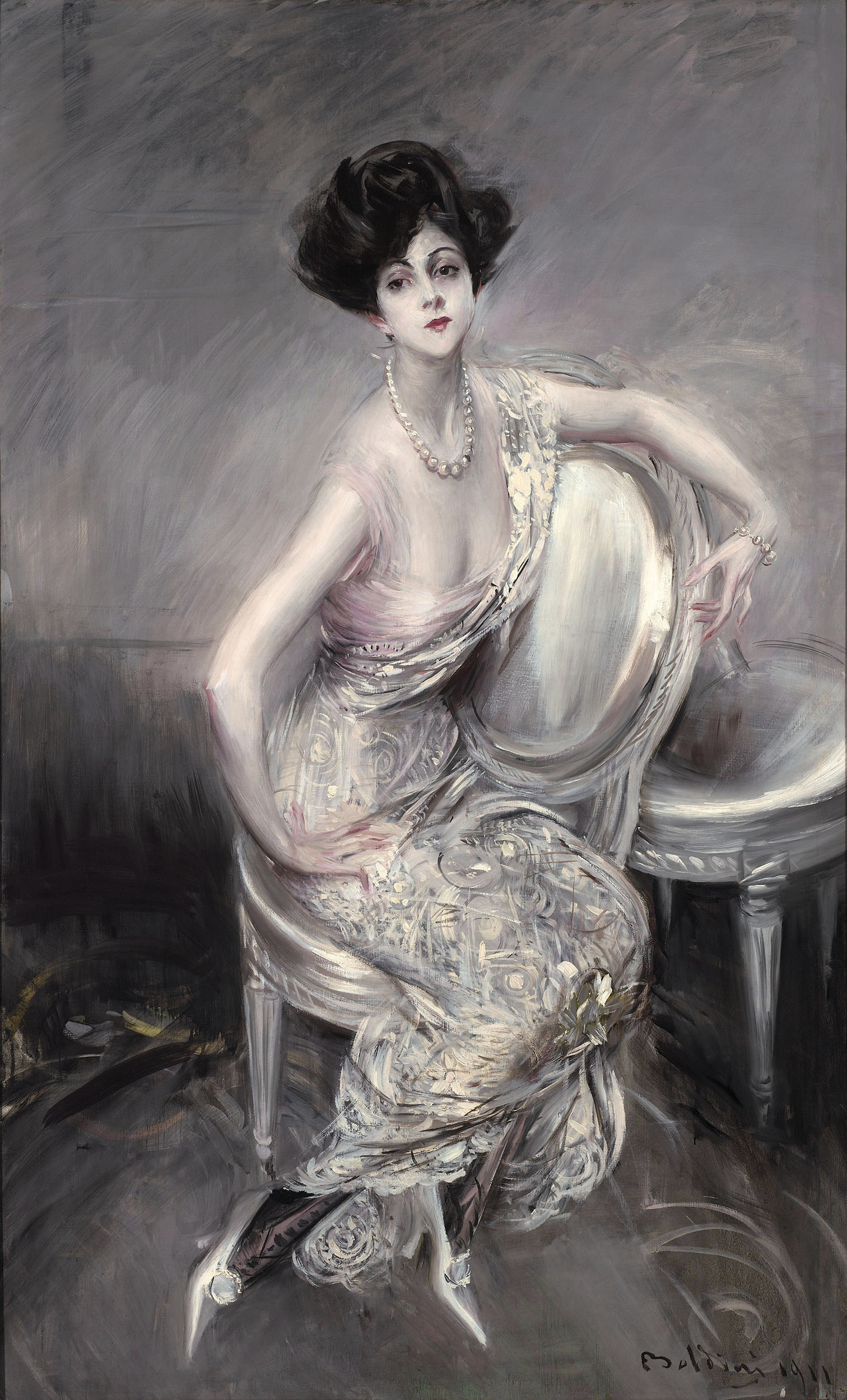
- Lydig by Giovanni Boldini, 1911.
- Born: Rita Hernandez de Alba de Acosta; October 1, 1875; New York City, New York, U.S.
- Died: October 19, 1929 (aged 54); Gotham Hotel, New York City
- Spouses: William Earl Dodge Stokes (m. 1895; div. 1900) Philip Mesier Lydig (m. 1902; div. 1919)
- Partner: Percy Stickney Grant
- Children: William Earl Dodge Stokes Jr.
- Parent(s): Ricardo de Acosta; Micaela Hernández de Alba y de Alba
- Relatives: Mercedes de Acosta (sister); Aida de Acosta (sister)

Rita Hernandez de Alba de Acosta Stokes Lydig (October 1, 1875 – October 19, 1929) was an American socialite named by one observer as "the most picturesque woman in America." She was photographed by Adolf de Meyer, Edward Steichen, and Gertrude Käsebier, sculpted in alabaster by Malvina Hoffman, and was painted by Giovanni Boldini and John Singer Sargent, among others.

== Early life ==
Rita de Acosta was born in New York City in 1875 to Ricardo de Acosta (1837–1907), a steamship-line executive born in Cuba to Spanish parents, and a Spanish mother, Micaela Hernández de Alba y de Alba (1853–1921), reputedly a relation of the Dukes of Alba. She had seven siblings: Joaquín, Enrique, Ricardo, Mercedes, Aida, Maria, and Ángela.

Her sister Mercedes de Acosta, a lover of movie star Greta Garbo, was an author, a scriptwriter, and social critic. Another sister, Aida de Acosta, became the first female to fly a powered aircraft solo and was the second wife of United States Assistant Secretary of War Henry Skillman Breckinridge, and another sister, Maria, was the wife of composer Theodore Ward Chanler.

== Influence on art and fashion ==
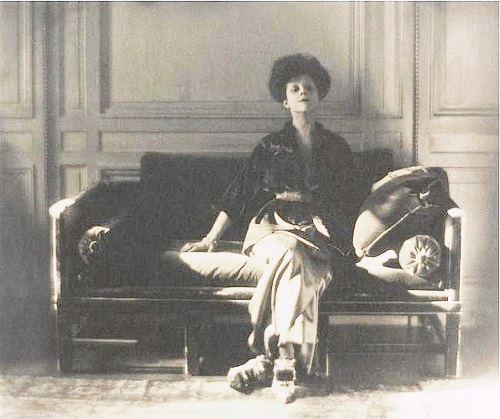
Rita Lydig photographed by Baron Adolf de Meyer in 1913

Rita lived in New York, Paris and London, and counted Edgar Degas, Auguste Rodin, Leo Tolstoy, Sarah Bernhardt, Ethel Barrymore and Claude Debussy among her friends. She also supported the suffragette cause.

Famous for her extravagant lifestyle, "...Rita was equally welcomed in Paris, where she spent parts of each year. She would arrive at the Ritz with a hairdresser, masseuse, chauffeur, secretary, maid,... and forty Louis Vuitton trunks... In Paris, she joined ranks with musicians, artists, intellectuals, and philosophers such as Rodin, Eleonora Duse, Yvette Guilbert etc." Impressed by Rita's innate creative spirit, Isabella Stewart Gardner, the great collector and creator of the Gardner museum in Boston, once asked their mutual friend, John Singer Sargent, why Lydig had never expressed herself artistically. "Why should she?" Sargent answered, "She herself is art."

She also wrote one novel, Tragic Mansions (Boni & Liveright, 1927), under the name Mrs Philip Lydig, a society melodrama described as "emotionally moving and appealing" by The New York Times.

== Personal life ==
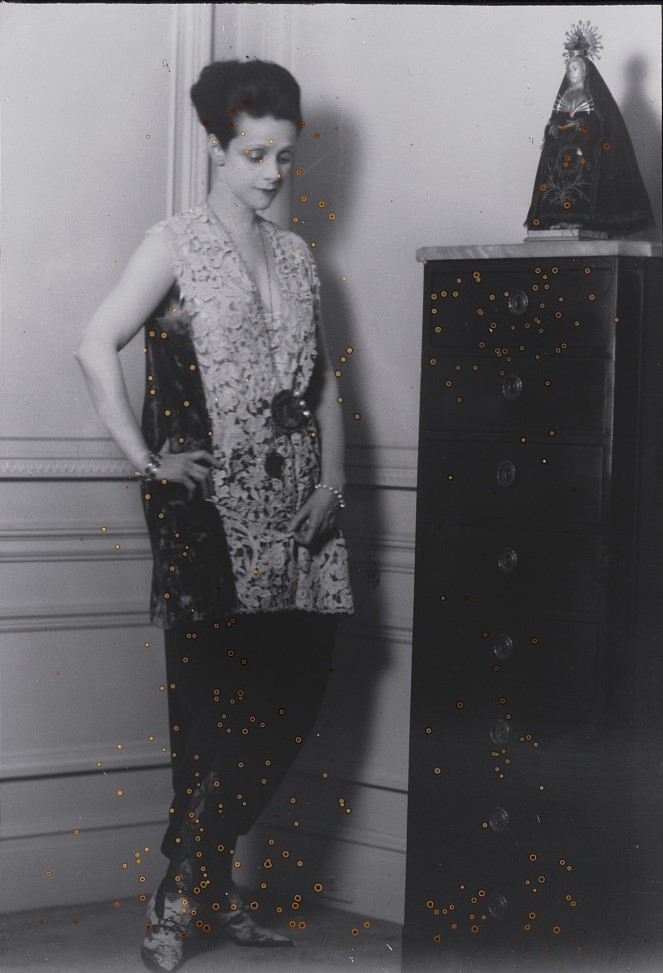
Portrait photograph of Mrs. Rita Lydig, 1925

Rita de Acosta was married twice. Her first marriage was on January 3, 1895, when the 20-year-old became the first wife of multimillionaire William Earl Dodge Stokes (1852–1926), who built The Ansonia on Manhattan's Upper West Side. The marriage was unhappy, reportedly due to Stokes's temper and physical cruelty, and when it was dissolved by divorce in 1900, she received a settlement of nearly two million dollars, a record for the time. In February 1922, she testified in court against Stokes, then going through an acrimonious divorce from his second wife, stating that he used to beat her during their marriage. Before their divorce, they lived at 262 West 72nd Street and became the parents of one son, William Earl Dodge Stokes Jr. (1896–1982).

In 1902, she married Major Philip Mesier Lydig, a wealthy and socially prominent retired officer in the United States Army, in Grace Church chantry by the Rev. William R. Houghton. She was given away by her brother Ricardo, her sister Aida was her maid of honor and William Astor Chanler was Lydig's best man. In 1913, she sold her art collection, which included pieces by Sandro Botticelli. They separated in 1914 and divorced in 1919.

In 1921, Lydig announced her engagement to Reverend Percy Stickney Grant (1860–1927), rector of the Church of the Ascension. Their wedding plans were broken off in 1924 when Bishop William Manning refused to authorize the marriage, citing Lydig being a divorcée with two living former husbands. Rev. Grant died shortly afterwards, leaving his personal fortune to the woman he had hoped to marry, and Lydig spent large sums of money on fashion, art, furniture, and other objects to overcome her grief. Heavily in debt, she was forced to sell her Washington Square home and its contents, and she was declared bankrupt.

Lydig died of pernicious anaemia at the Gotham Hotel on October 27, 1929, at the age of 54. She was buried with her mother and, later, her sister Mercedes at Trinity Church Cemetery in lower Manhattan, New York City.

=== Legacy ===
Her personal wardrobe became the basis for the start of the Costume Institute at the Metropolitan Museum of Art.
