= Seth Flowerman =

American entrepreneur

- Born: c. 1985 (age 40–41)
- Occupation: Entrepreneur
- Years active: 2001–present
- Known for: President and CEO of PLT Health Solutions

Seth Flowerman (born c. 1985 (age 40–41)) is the President and CEO of PLT Health Solutions. He is an entrepreneur who formed his first company while in high school.

== Early life and education ==
Flowerman attended the Pingry School. He earned a B.S. from Cornell University in 2008 and an MBA from the S.C. Johnson Graduate School of Management in 2009. He was a member of Sigma Phi and Sphinx Head at Cornell.

== Career ==
At age 16, Flowerman founded Career Explorations, a program that sets American college and high school students up with internships in Boston, Chicago, London, Los Angeles, New York City, and San Francisco . Four years later, he founded Vertex Academic Services, a test preparation provider and educational consulting company in Manhattan. Vertex was acquired in 2011 by A List Education. Career Explorations was acquired in 2010 by Musiker Discovery Programs and Dream Careers Inc. and now operates under the name Discovery Internships.

== Awards ==
- 2004: Student Entrepreneur of the Year, Junior Achievement
- 2007: Kaplan Most Promising Campus CEOs
- 2008: BusinessWeek's 25 Entrepreneurs under 25
- 2008: Social Impact Award, Global Student Entrepreneurship Awards
