= Percy Stickney Grant =

American Episcopalian clergyman

The Reverend Percy Stickney Grant
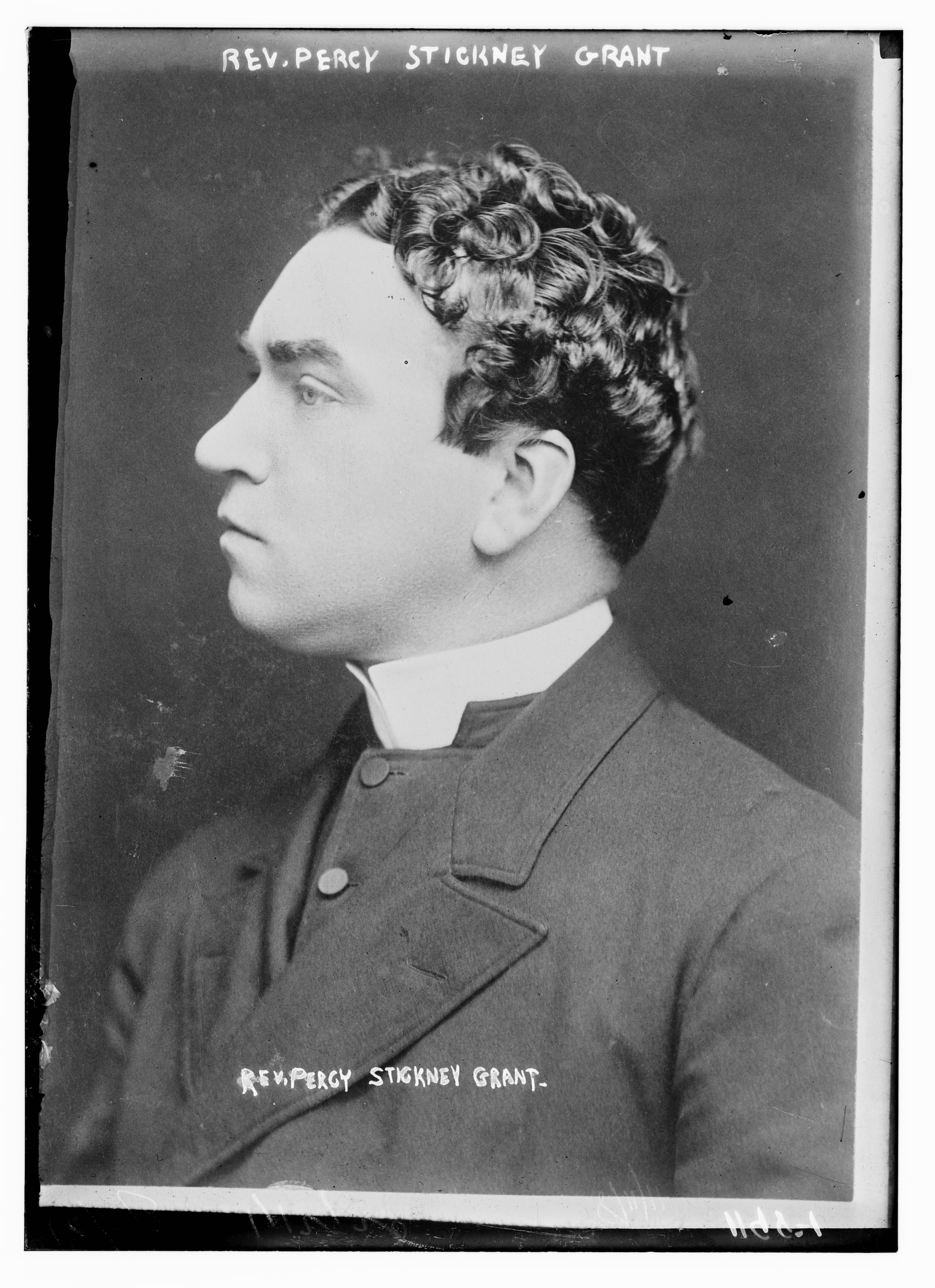
- Born: 1860; Boston, Massachusetts, US
- Died: 1927 (aged 66–67)
- Education: Harvard University; Episcopal Theological School
- Partner: Rita de Acosta Lydig

Ecclesiastical career
- Religion: Christianity (Anglican)
- Church: Episcopal Church (United States)
- Ordained: 1886 (deacon); 1887 (priest)

Percy Stickney Grant (1860–1927) was an American Episcopal priest.

Grant was born in Boston and was educated at Harvard University (AB, 1883; AM, 1886) and at the Episcopal Theological School in Cambridge, Massachusetts (BD, 1886). He was a curate of the church of the Ascension (1886) and incumbent of St. Mark's Church (1887–1893; both in Fall River, Massachusetts) and was also rector at Swansea, Massachusetts, in 1890–1893.

In 1893 he became incumbent of the Church of the Ascension in New York City. He became known for his support of socialism and for his "forum" for the expression of views on labor and living conditions. Advocates of all political and social doctrines were permitted to speak freely. This was widely criticized and finally, in 1923, following action taken by Bishop William T. Manning, the forum was greatly modified in its character. He also came in controversy with Manning on the question of divorce. He became engaged to Rita de Acosta Lydig who had been divorced. Manning refused to authorize the marriage and it did not take place. In June 1924, he resigned his rectorship.

== Published works ==
- Ad Matrem (1905)
- The Search of Belisarius (1907)
- Observations in Asia (1908)
- Socialism and Christianity (1910)
- The Return of Odysseus (1912)
- Fair Play for the Worker (1918)
- Essays and Poems (1922)
- The Religion of Main Street (1923)
