= Mercedes de Acosta =

American poet, playwright, and novelist (1892–1968)

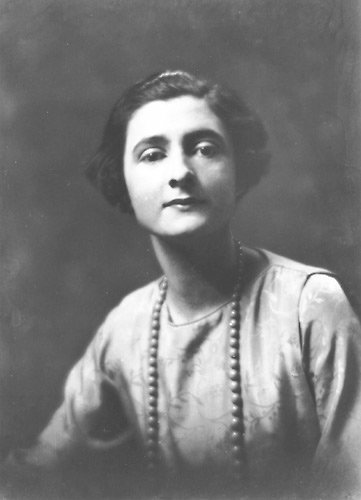
- Mercedes Hede de Acosta, 1919 or 1920
- Born: March 1, 1892; New York City, US
- Died: May 9, 1968 (aged 76); New York City, US
- Occupations: Poet, novelist, playwright
- Spouse: Abram Poole (m. 1920; div. 1935)
- Parents: Ricardo de Acosta; Micaela Hernández de Alba y de Alba
- Relatives: Rita de Acosta Lydig; Aida de Acosta; (sisters)

Mercedes de Acosta (March 1, 1892 – May 9, 1968) was an American poet, playwright, and novelist. Although she failed to achieve artistic and professional distinction, de Acosta is known for her many lesbian affairs with celebrated Broadway and Hollywood personalities including Alla Nazimova, Isadora Duncan, Eva Le Gallienne, and Marlene Dietrich. Her best-known involvement was with Greta Garbo with whom, in 1931, she began a sporadic and volatile romance. Her 1960 memoir, Here Lies the Heart, is considered part of gay history insofar that it hints at the lesbian element in some of her relationships.

== Background ==
She was born in New York City on March 1, 1892. Her father, Ricardo de Acosta, was born in Cuba to Spanish parents, and later immigrated to the United States. Her mother, Micaela Hernández de Alba y de Alba, was Spanish and allegedly a descendant of the Spanish Dukes of Alba. De Acosta had five siblings: Aida, Ricardo Jr., Angela, Maria, and Rita. Maria married the socially prominent landscape architect A. Robeson Sargent, son of Harvard botanist Charles Sprague Sargent. Rita became a famous beauty known as Rita Lydig. De Acosta attended elementary school at the Convent of the Blessed Sacrament on West 79th Street in Manhattan to learn "feminine ways," where Dorothy Parker was a classmate. While there, she met two lesbian nuns, and took on the task to deliver notes between them, and even stood guard in the corridors for them.

De Acosta married painter Abram Poole (January 12, 1882 – May 24, 1961) in 1920. They divorced in 1935.

She was described in 1955 by Garbo biographer, John Bainbridge, as "a woman of courtly manners, impeccable decorative taste and great personal elegance ... a woman with a passionate and intense devotion to the art of living ... and endowed with a high spirit, energy, eclectic curiosity and a varied interest in the arts."

== Personal life ==
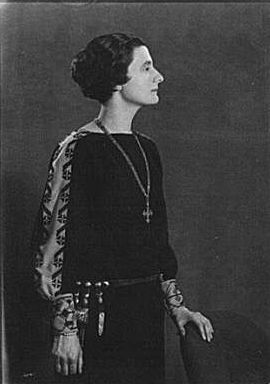
Mercedes Hede de Acosta by Arnold Genthe, after 1919

De Acosta was involved in numerous lesbian relationships with Broadway's and Hollywood's elite, and she did not attempt to hide her sexuality; her uncloseted existence was rare and daring in her generation. De Acosta is often associated with The Sewing Circle, an informal network of lesbian and bisexual female writers and actresses, who socialized and supported each other; most participants were closeted, unlike de Acosta. In 1916, she began an affair with actress Alla Nazimova, and later with dancer Isadora Duncan. Shortly after marrying Abram Poole in 1920, de Acosta became involved in a five-year relationship with actress Eva Le Gallienne. De Acosta wrote two plays for Le Gallienne, Sandro Botticelli and Jehanne de Arc. After the financial failures of both plays they ended their relationship.

Over the next decade, she was involved with several famous actresses and dancers, including Greta Garbo, Marlene Dietrich, Ona Munson, and Russian ballerina Tamara Platonovna Karsavina. Additional unsubstantiated rumors include affairs with Tallulah Bankhead, Pola Negri, Eleonora Duse, Katherine Cornell, and Alice B. Toklas. An annoyed Bankhead regularly dubbed de Acosta as "Countess Dracula" following their alleged affair, due to her appearance and fashion as she was "notorious for walking the streets of New York in mannish pants, pointed shoes trimmed with buckles, tricorn hat, and cape" and a "chalk white face, deep-set eyes, thin red lips, and jet black hair." Rumors say de Acosta once stated, "I can get any woman away from any man," but there is no evidence to substantiate this claim.

An ardent liberal, de Acosta was committed to several political causes. Concerned about the Spanish Civil War, which began in 1936, for example, she supported the Republican government that opposed the Nationalist faction. A tireless advocate for women's rights, she wrote in her memoir, "I believed...in every form of independence for women and I was...an enrolled worker for women's suffrage."

She also became a vegetarian and, out of respect for animals, refused to wear furs.

=== Relationship with Greta Garbo ===
De Acosta's best-known relationship was with Greta Garbo. When Garbo's close friend, author Salka Viertel, introduced them in 1931, they quickly became involved. As their relationship developed, it became erratic and volatile with Garbo always in control. The two were very close sporadically and then apart for lengthy periods when Garbo, annoyed by Mercedes' obsessive behavior, coupled with her own neuroses, ignored her. In any case, they remained friends for thirty years during which time Garbo wrote de Acosta 181 letters, cards, and telegrams. About their friendship, Cecil Beaton, who was close to both women, recorded in his 1958 memoir, "Mercedes is [Garbo's] very best friend and for 30 years has stood by her, willing to devote her life to her".

Although it has been argued that an intimate relationship between them cannot be proved, de Acosta states they were lovers. Contrary to legend, she did not do so in her memoir. In 1959, when she was destitute, de Acosta sold her papers to the Rosenbach Museum & Library in Philadelphia and claims to have reluctantly included romantic letters from Garbo. "I would not have had the heart or courage to have burned these letters," she wrote William McCarthy, curator of the museum. "I mean, of course, Eva [sic], Greta's and Marlene's who were lovers.... I only hope ... they will be respected and protected from the eyes of vulgar people". All of Garbo's and de Acosta's recent biographers, moreover, discuss their involvement. Per de Acosta's request, Garbo's letters were made available to the public in 2000, ten years after her death, and none were explicitly romantic. However, Garbo's family, which controls her estate, has permitted only 87 of 181 letters to be made public.

=== Interest in eastern spirituality ===
In the early 1930s de Acosta developed an interest in Hinduism and was encouraged to seek out Indian mystic Meher Baba when he arrived in Hollywood. For several years she was captivated by his philosophy and methods and he often gave her advice about ways to address her problems. Later, she studied the philosophy of Hindu sage Ramana Maharshi who introduced her to yoga, meditation, and other spiritual practices she hoped would help ease her suffering. In 1938, she met Hindu dancer Ram Gopal in Hollywood. They immediately established a rapport and became close lifelong friends. Later that year, they traveled to India to meet Maharshi.

When asked about religion, de Acosta once said that although she had grown up Catholic, she would be, if she had to be anything, a Buddhist.

== Later life, controversial autobiography and death ==
In 1960, when de Acosta was seriously ill with a brain tumor and in need of money, she published her memoir, Here Lies the Heart. The book was well-received by critics, and many of de Acosta's close friends praised it. However, its implied homosexuality resulted in the severance of several friendships with women who felt she had betrayed them. Garbo ended their friendship at this time. Eva Le Gallienne in particular was furious, denouncing de Acosta as a liar and stating that she invented the stories for fame. Regardless, many of her affairs and relationships with women, including that with Le Gallienne, are confirmed in personal correspondence.

An exception was Marlene Dietrich, who continued to correspond with her and loved the book. According to critic Patricia White, "If she craved being seen, MdA was more careful about what she said than she is given credit for. She wrote a name-dropping memoir, but for something attacked for exaggeration, it barely alludes to homosexuality." In any case, she gained a reputation that was not appreciated by everyone. But as Alice B. Toklas, lover of Gertrude Stein and de Acosta's long-term friend, wrote to a disapproving critic, "Say what you will about Mercedes, she's had the most important women of the twentieth century."

De Acosta died at age 76 in poverty in New York City. She is buried at Trinity Cemetery in Washington Heights, New York City.

== Legacy ==
De Acosta has usually been described disparagingly, dismissed as a "notorious lesbian" who was a dishonest nuisance to her lovers and who consistently "stalked" Garbo. Garbo's biographers, for example, assess their relationship from Garbo's perspective in which Garbo is fundamentally blameless in their difficult relationship, a perpetual victim of de Acosta's alleged irksome behavior. But Robert A. Schanke, de Acosta's recent biographer, attempts, on the basis of extensive research, to provide an accurate picture of her. She was, Schanke acknowledges, flawed and imperfect, a complex woman who impaired several of her relationships and failed to achieve her professional and romantic aspirations. But he reveals her to have been an exceptionally lively, intelligent, and dynamic person who had many devoted friends. She was, he argues, a brave lesbian of her times and a person of integrity who remained kind and loyal to most everyone with whom she crossed paths. He suggests that the many denigrating portrayals of her may derive from the deep homophobia of her generation.

She has been accused of fabricating incidents in her memoir and lacing it with half-truths and fantasies. She herself confessed, "I may have made mistakes in some dates or minor incidents but…I feel I have held to the spirit of my statement if not to the letter." Nevertheless, Karen Swenson, a Garbo biographer, and Schanke identified and corrected significant errors in de Acosta's account. While the memoir was initially unsuccessful, it was rediscovered in the late 1960s and widely read in the underground gay community. In spite of its inaccuracies, it is now recognized as an important contribution to gay and lesbian history.

Her poetic work consists mainly of three books published during her life: Moods (prose poems) (1919), Archways of Life (1921), and Streets and Shadows (1922). A comprehensive compilation of these three books appeared, for the first time, in Spanish translation under the title Imposeída (46 poemas) (Las Cruces, NM: Eds. La Mirada, 2016, ISBN 978-0-9911325-4-6), edited by Jesús J. Barquet and Carlota Caulfield. Barquet and Caulfield wrote the introduction to the book ("Mercedes de Acosta en traje de poeta") and, along with Joaquín Badajoz, authored the Spanish translations. In 2017, Imposeida was republished by Ediciones Holguin (ISBN 978-959-221-448-4), in Cuba; and in 2018 an expanded and revised version appeared in bilingual (English/Spanish) format in Ediciones Torremozas (ISBN 978-84-7839-763-1), in Madrid.

Composer Joseph Hallman memorialized de Acosta in the song cycle "Raving Beauty" for flute, harp, cello, and soprano. The song cycle was based on the correspondence and ephemera held in the de Acosta collection at the Rosenbach Museum. The work deals with her relationships and correspondences with Greta Garbo, Marlene Dietrich, Isadora Duncan, Igor Stravinsky, and others. Commissioned by the Philadelphia International Festival for the Arts, it has been performed many times, including by the Secret Opera.

== See also ==
- List of Cuban American writers
- List of Famous Cuban-Americans
- List of Lesbian Poets

== Works ==
Autobiography

- de Acosta, Mercedes (1960). Here Lies the Heart. New York: Reynal Press – via archive.org.

Novels

- de Acosta, Mercedes (1920). Wind Chaff. New York: Moffat, Yard & Company – via Google Books.
- de Acosta, Mercedes (1928). Until the Day Break. New York ; London: Longmans, Green.

Plays

- Acosta, Mercedes de (1923). Sandro Botticelli. New York: Moffat, Yard & Company – via Google Books.
- de Acosta, Mercedes (18 August 2008). Schanke, Robert A. (ed.). Women in Turmoil: Six Plays. Southern Illinois University Press. ISBN 978-0-8093-2510-8. "Log-in and borrow"

Poems

- de Acosta, Mercedes (1919). Moods; Prose poems. New York: Moffat, Yard and Company – via Project Gutenberg. (16 poems)
- de Acosta, Mercedes (1921). Archways of Life. New York: Moffat, Yard and Company – via Project Gutenberg. (40 poems)
- de Acosta, Mercedes (1922). Streets and Shadows. New York: Moffat, Yard and Company – via archive.org. (46 poems)
- de Acosta, Mercedes (2016). Imposeída (46 poemas). Eds. Jesus J. Barquet and Carlota Caulfield. Las Cruces, NM: Eds. La Mirada. ISBN 978-0-9911325-4-6.
  - de Acosta, Mercedes (2018). Imposeída. Bilingual edition. Eds. Jesus J. Barquet and Carlota Caulfield. Madrid, Ediciones Torremozas ISBN 978-84-7839-763-1.
