= Law Preservation Party =

U.S. state affiliate of the Prohibition Party

Law Preservation Party was the name used in the State of New York by the Prohibition Party during the early 1930s. The name change was done to affirm their support of the continuance of Prohibition in the United States in the face of widespread opposition which ended with the passing of the 21st Amendment in 1933.

== Electoral history ==
The party was established in 1930 and ran a candidate for governor, Robert P Carroll, who received 190,666 votes, 6.0% of the total and sufficient to get the party certified as an official party. In 1932 the party ran candidates for House election, 1932 congressional and state elections. At its 1932 convention in Syracuse, the party cross-endorsed nine Republicans from the western part of the state. Five congressional candidates did appear on the ballot as the sole nominee of the party. Of these, Ernest R Clark achieved a respectable 20,209 votes, running against incumbent Republican James Wolcott Wadsworth Jr. (50,855) and Democrat David A. White (35,367) in the 39th congressional district. Senatorial candidate D. Leigh Colvin earned 74,610 votes from a total vote of over 3.5 million. Its candidate for governor, John F. Vichert, received 102,959 votes 2.2% of the 4.7 million votes cast. This kept the party certified and on the ballot. Following the passage of the 21st Amendment, party activity declined. By the elections of 1934, when Senatorial nominee William Sheafe Chase earned only 16,769 votes. Four Republican congressional candidates were cross endorsed, including the successful candidacies of Hamilton Fish, Jr. (also endorsed by the Socialist Party of America), Frances D. Culkin and Robert L. Bacon. Five congressional candidates again appeared solely on the Law Preservation line, with Neil D. Cranmer achieving by far the best result with 2,231 out of the more than 80,000 cast in the 37th congressional district. The candidate for Governor, William Varney received only 20,449 votes, 0.5% of the total and the party was decertified.

The Law Preservation Party did not contest the 1936 or subsequent congressional elections.

The strength of the party was upstate New York. In 1930, when its candidate for governor received 6.0% of the statewide vote, its regional split was 0.6% in New York City, but 14.0% in upstate New York.

== Relaunch ==
In September 2017, the party relaunched as the New York Prohibition Party in response to the alcohol-friendly and pro-gambling policies of incumbent Governor Andrew Cuomo. It fielded one candidate in the 2018 New York state elections, Jonathan Makeley, a 22-year-old college student majoring in history, who ran for the state Assembly seat held at the time by Raymond Walter. Makeley failed to qualify for the November ballot and received 3 write-in votes. New York State would host the 2023 Prohibition National Convention.

== Articles ==
- "Political Combinations in Elections". Harvard Law Review. 45 (5): 906–912. March 1932. doi:10.2307/1332029. JSTOR 1332029.
- "Dry Factions Favor Clark for Congress. Teacher, Lecturer Favored for Preservationist. Designation Confers Today with Judge Remington to Support Hoover". Rochester Times Union. August 12, 1932. RVF. Bio Men V19. Archived from the original on September 28, 2007.
- "Cuthbert Pound Nominated: Chief Judge of State Court of Appeals Given Support of Three Parties for Election" (PDF). Cornell Alumni News. 35 (3): 1. October 13, 1932. Archived from the original (PDF) on June 11, 2007.
- Ellis, George D.; South Trimble. "Statistics of the Congressional and Presidential Elections of November 8, 1932" (PDF). Clerk of the House of Representatives. pp. 23–26. Archived from the original (PDF) on October 16, 2006.
- Leroy D. Brandon; Ellis, George D.; South Trimble. "Statistics of the Congressional and Presidential Elections of November 6, 1934" (PDF). Clerk of the House of Representatives. pp. 19–23. Archived from the original (PDF) on October 26, 2006.
