= Dream Careers =

American corporation specializing in internships

Dream Careers Inc.
- Company type: Private
- Predecessor: University of Dreams
- Founded: February 2000
- Founder: Eric Lochtefeld; Beth Lochtefeld
- Headquarters: San Mateo, California, United States
- Number of locations: 3
- Key people: Eric Normington (CEO); Danielle Normington (COO); Noah Galabow (CFO)
- Services: Internships
- Revenue: US$12.5 million (2010)
- Website: summerinternships.com

Dream Careers Inc., formerly known as University of Dreams, is an American corporation providing mainly summer internship programs. The company is based in San Mateo, California. According to The New York Times, they are one of the most visible players in the industry.

== History ==
The company was founded in February 2000 by Eric Lochtefeld as University of Dreams. It was featured on the Inc. 500 list of fastest-growing companies in American and also on an NPR broadcast.

University of Dreams acquired Career Explorations, a summer internship program for high school students, in 2010 and renamed itself to the current name of Dream Careers.

== Services ==
Dream Careers offers internships to college undergraduates. It charges a flat fee for an internship placement, housing, transportation, meals, and other related services.
