= Oren Root =

American academic (1838–1907)

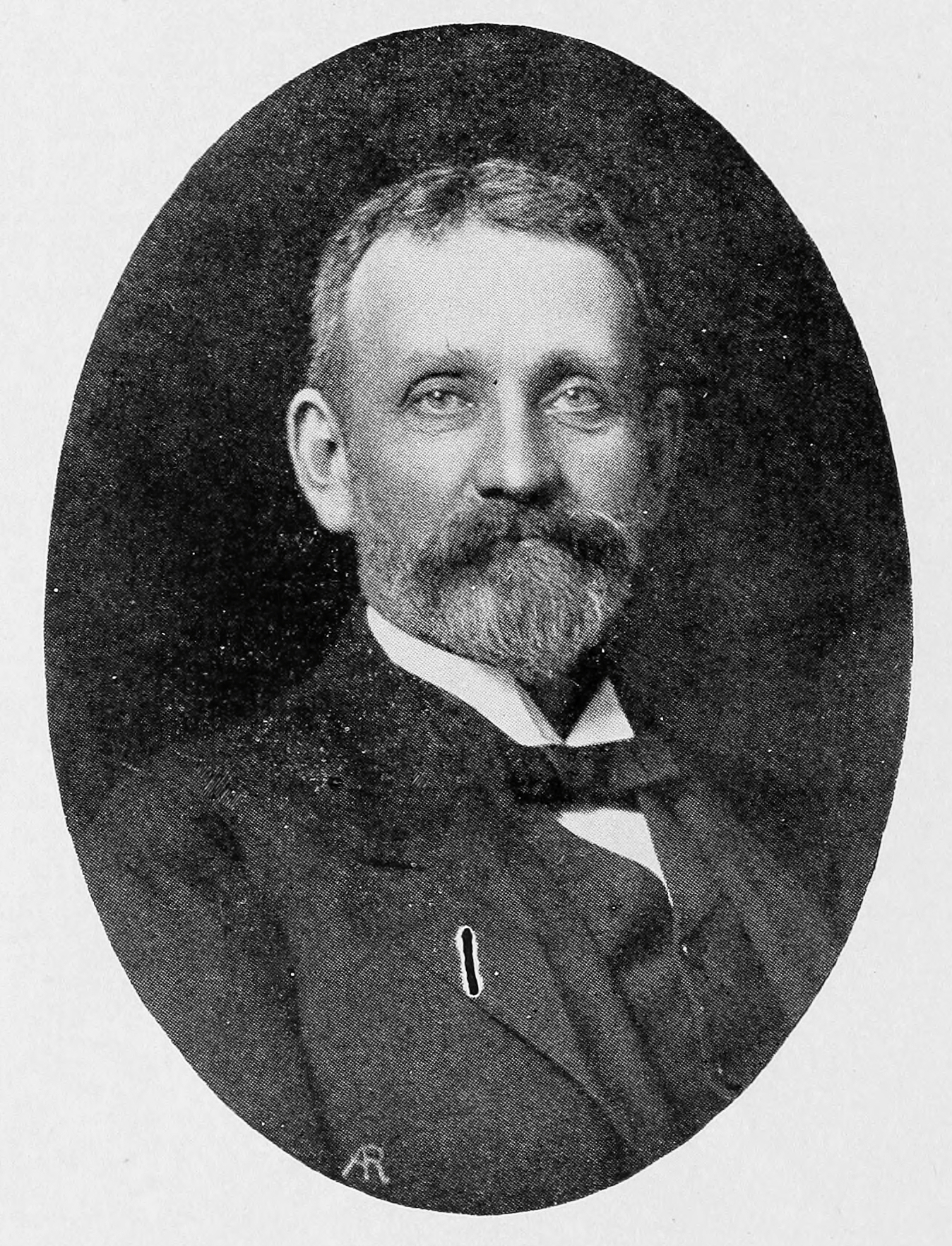
- Born: May 18, 1838; Syracuse, New York, US
- Died: August 27, 1907 (aged 69); Utica, New York, US
- Occupations: Academic and minister
- Relatives: Elihu Root (brother)

Academic background
- Education: Hamilton College, 1856 Rutgers College, D.D. 1891 Union College, L.H.D. 1895

Academic work
- Discipline: Mathematics and English
- Institutions: University of Missouri Pritchett College Hamilton College

Oren Root Jr. (May 18, 1838 – August 27, 1907) was an American college president, professor, and minister. He was president of Pritchett College and professor at Hamilton College and the University of Missouri. He was a founder of the Mystic Order of Veiled Prophets of the Enchanted Realm, often called "The Grotto", an appendant body in Freemasonry.

== Early life ==
Root was born in Syracuse, New York on May 18, 1838. His father was Oren Root, a professor of mathematics at Hamilton College in Clinton, New York. He studied first at the Clinton Grammar School.

He graduated from Hamilton College in 1856. He studied law under Theodore W. Dwight and was admitted to the Wisconsin Bar Association in June 1858. He then attended Rutgers College, graduating with a Doctor of Divinity in 1891. He received a Doctor of Human Letters from Union College in 1895.

== Career ==
Root briefly practiced law before becoming principal of a high school in Monroe, Michigan in 1859. From 1860 to 1862, he was a math tutor at Hamilton College. Next, he was the principal of the Rome Academy in Rome, New York for four years.

In 1866, Root became and professor and the chair of English Department at the University of Missouri in Columbia, staying there for five years. On November 7, 1870, he helped seven students form the Zeta Phi Society, a social and secret society that is now the Zeta Phi chapter of Beta Theta Pi. Root was also co-editor of The Columbian Speaker.

Root became the superintendent of the schools in Carrollton, Missouri in 1871. He was president of Pritchett College in Glasgow, Missouri from 1873 to 1876. He became a Presbyterian minister in 1874, preaching in Glasgow and Salisbury on Sundays. However, he converted to the Dutch Reformed Church when he became pastor of a congregation in Utica, New York in 1890.

He returned to Hamilton College in 1880 to assist his father in the mathematics department. In 1881, he succeeded his father as chair of mathematics. He also served as the college's registrar. He resigned from Hamilton College in June 1907.

== Personal life ==
Root was married three times and had two daughters and three sons. He married Anna J. Higgins of Waterford, New York, in 1862; she died in 1863. Next, he married Ida C. Gordon of Columbia, Missouri, who died in 1896. In 1901, he married Anna Ray Quisenberry of Carrollton, Missouri.

Root was a high degree Freemason and was one of the founders of the Mystic Order of Veiled Prophets of the Enchanted Realm, an appendant body in Freemasonry. He was grand high priest of the Royal Arch Masons of Missouri in 1868, grand commander of the Knights Templar of Missouri in 1871, and chaplain of the Grand Lodge F&AM of New York State from 1891 to 1892, and in 1905.

Root lived in a house on College Hill near Clinton, New York, next door to the summer home of his brother, Elihu Root, who was United States Secretary of State. He died from cirrhosis of the liver at his home on August 27, 1907. He had been sick for a year.
