= Lincoln County Sheriff's Office =

Lincoln County Sheriff's Office may refer to several sheriffs departments in the United States, including:

- Lincoln County Sheriff's Office (Arkansas)
- Lincoln County Sheriff's Office (Colorado), a law enforcement agency in Colorado
- Lincoln County Sheriff's Office (Idaho), a law enforcement agency in Idaho
- Lincoln County Sheriff's Office (Kansas), a law enforcement agency in Kansas
- Lincoln County Sheriff's Office (Kentucky), a law enforcement agency in Kentucky
- Lincoln County Sheriff's Office (Louisiana), a law enforcement agency in Louisiana
- Lincoln County Sheriff's Office (Maine), a law enforcement agency in Maine
- Lincoln County Sheriff's Office (Minnesota), a law enforcement agency in Minnesota
- Lincoln County Sheriff's Office (Mississippi), a law enforcement agency in Mississippi
- Lincoln County Sheriff's Office (Missouri), a law enforcement agency in Missouri
- Lincoln County Sheriff's Office, a law enforcement agency in Montana
- Lincoln County Sheriff's Office (Nebraska)
- Lincoln County, Nevada Sheriff's Office
- Lincoln County, New Mexico Sheriff's Office
- Lincoln County Sheriff's Office (Nevada), a law enforcement agency in Nevada
- Lincoln County Sheriff's Office (New Mexico), a law enforcement agency in New Mexico
- Lincoln County Sheriff's Office (North Carolina), a law enforcement agency in North Carolina
- Lincoln County Sheriff's Office (Oklahoma), a law enforcement agency in Oklahoma
- Lincoln County Sheriff's Office (Oregon), a law enforcement agency in Oregon
- Lincoln County Sheriff's Office (South Dakota), a law enforcement agency in South Dakota
- Lincoln County, Tennessee Sheriff's Office
- Lincoln County Sheriff's Office (Washington), a law enforcement agency in Washington
- Lincoln County Sheriff's Office (West Virginia), a law enforcement agency in West Virginia
- Lincoln County Sheriff's Office, a law enforcement agency in Wisconsin
- Lincoln County Sheriff's Office (Wyoming), a law enforcement agency in Wyoming

== See also ==
- Lincoln County (disambiguation)
