= Lincoln County =

Lincoln County may refer to:

== Australia ==
- Lincoln County, New South Wales
- the former name of Lincoln Land District, Tasmania

== Canada ==
- Lincoln County, Ontario, one of the historic counties of Ontario

== United Kingdom ==
- The archaic term "County of Lincoln" refers to Lincolnshire in modern usage

== United States ==
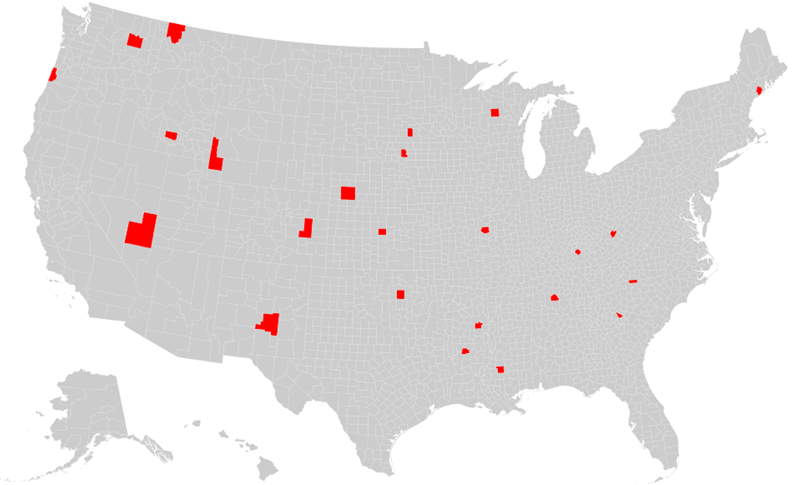
Lincoln counties in the United States.

- Lincoln County, Arkansas
- Lincoln County, Colorado
- Lincoln County, Georgia
- Lincoln County, Idaho
- Lincoln County, Kansas
- Lincoln County, Kentucky
- Lincoln County, Maine
- Lincoln County, Minnesota
- Lincoln County, Mississippi
- Lincoln County, Missouri
- Lincoln County, Montana
- Lincoln County, Nebraska
  - Lincoln County Sheriff's Office (Nebraska)
- Lincoln County, Nevada
- Lincoln County, New Mexico
- Lincoln County, North Carolina
- Lincoln County, Oklahoma
- Lincoln County, Oregon
- Lincoln County, South Dakota
- Lincoln County, Tennessee
- Lincoln County, Washington
- Lincoln County, West Virginia
- Lincoln County, Wisconsin
- Lincoln County, Wyoming
- Lincoln Parish, Louisiana

== Other uses ==
- Lincoln County (song), a song by Dave Davies which reached #15 in the UK charts in 1968
- Lincoln County War, New Mexico

== See also ==
- Lincoln Parish, Louisiana, United States
