= Boon Tuan Boon-Itt =

Thai Christian clergy

- บุญต๋วน บุญอิต
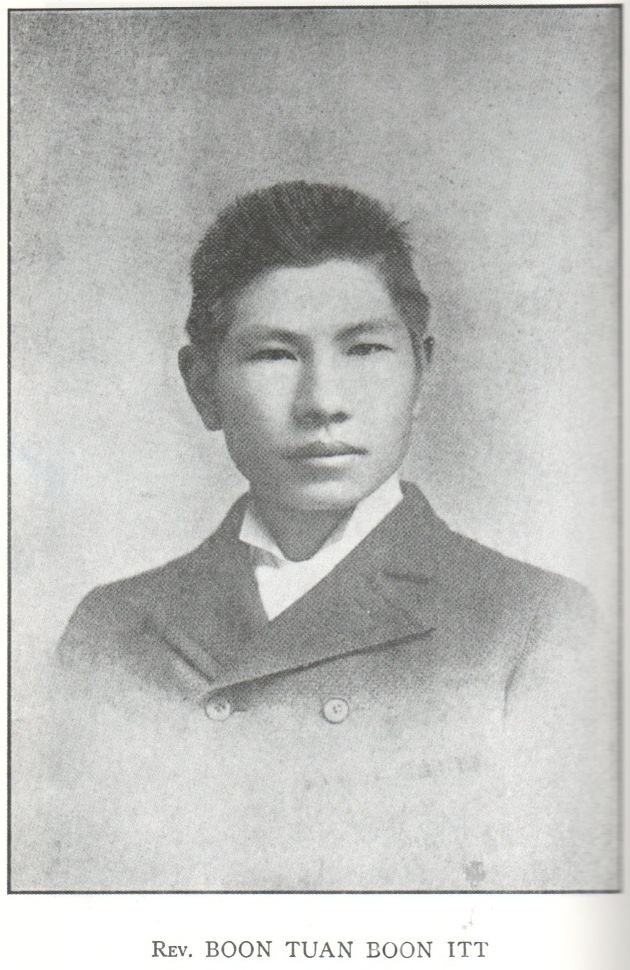
- Born: July 18, 1865; Ratchaburi, Siam
- Died: May 8, 1903 (aged 37); Bangkok, Siam
- Education: Williams College; Auburn Theological Seminary
- Known for: founding Padoongrasdra School

Boon Tuan Boon-Itt (Thai: บุญต๋วน บุญอิต; RTGS: Buntuan Bun-it, July 18, 1865 – May 8, 1903) was a respected leader in the early Thai Protestant Christian community, and is the first Thai Christian to establish a church in Thailand. Boon-Itt also founded Padoongrasdra School (Thai: โรงเรียนผดุงราษฎร์) in Phitsanulok province.

== Early life and education ==
Boon Tuan was born on July 18, 1865, in the village of Bang-Pa, Ratchaburi province, Siam (now Thailand). After the death of his father, Boon Tuan's family moved to Bangkok, where Boon Tuan and his brother Boon Yee were enrolled at the Christian school at Samray. At eleven years old, Boon Tuan was taken to the United States by the pioneer medical missionary Dr Samuel Reynolds House and his wife. In 1881, Boon Tuan was enrolled in Williston Seminary, Easthampton, Massachusetts. At this school, and then later at Williams College, Boon Tuan excelled in academics and athletics. As a student at Williams, Boon Tuan had an evangelical Christian conversion experience and worked with YMCA at the college. Boon Tuan graduated from Williams in 1889 and then enrolled in Auburn Theological Seminary to study for the Christian ministry.

== Career ==
In 1893, Boon Tuan returned to Siam to begin Christian ministry work in his native country. Boon Tuan married his cousin, Maa Kim Hock, on September 23, 1897. The newly married couple moved to Phitsanulok to begin Christian work in the province. In 1899, he founded a school for boys which is currently called Padoongrasdra School.

In 1902, Boon was asked by the American Presbyterian Mission Board to come to Bangkok to start a new church for young educated men who were graduating from mission schools and coming into the city in large numbers. Boon Tuan accepted this call to plant a church in Bangkok. He founded the church which is now called Suebsampantawong Church (Thai: คริสตจักรสืบสัมพันธวงศ์), the fourth Presbyterian church to be started in the city of Bangkok, and the first church in Thailand to be established and support entirely by Thai Christians themselves, apart from assistance from foreign missionaries.

== Death and legacy ==
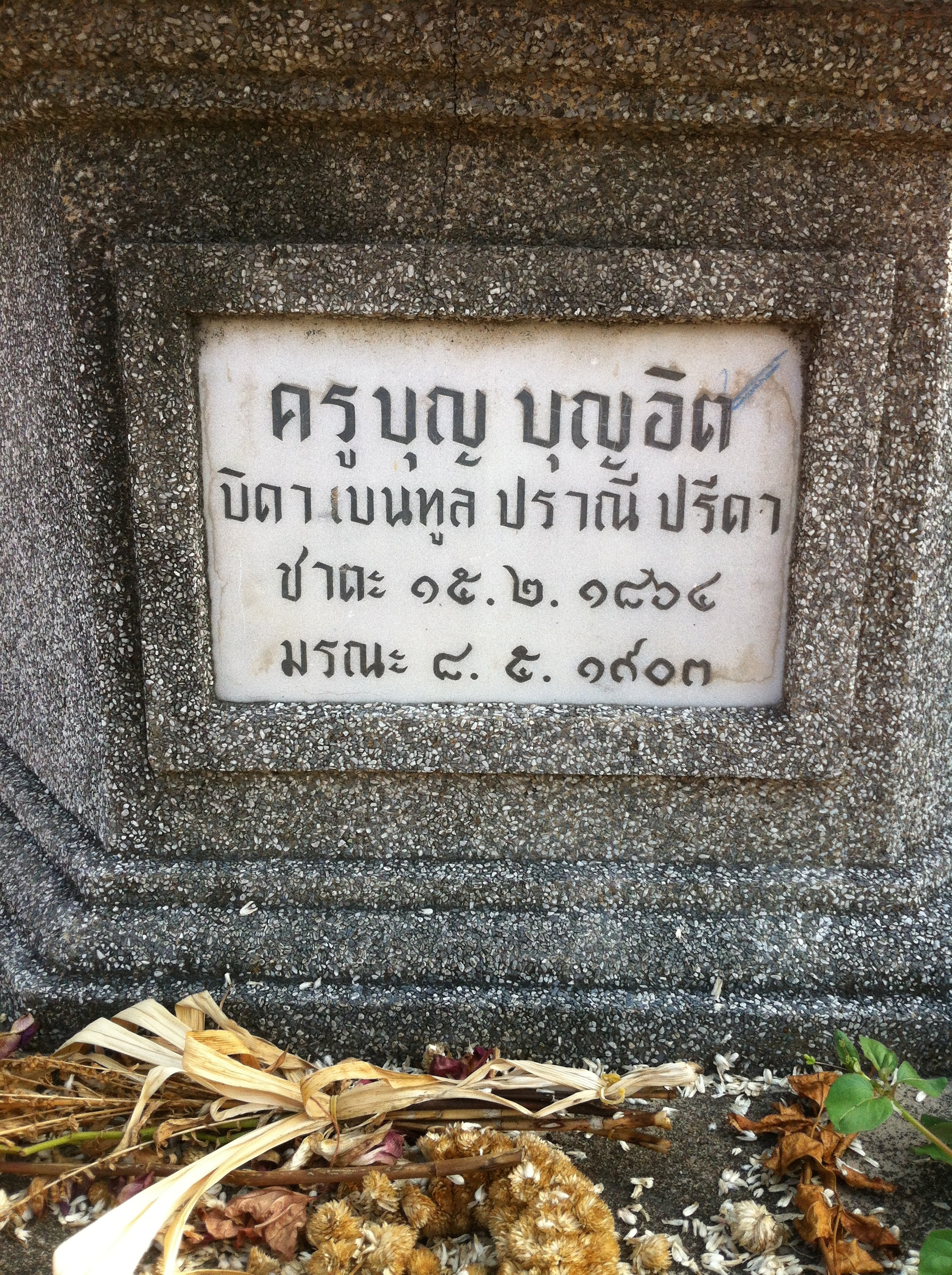
Grave of Boon Tuan Boon-Itt at Samray Presbyterian Church Cemetery

Boon Tuan died of cholera in Bangkok on May 8, 1903. In remembrance of Boon-Itt, Prince Damrong, the Minister of Interior stated, "Boon-Itt was a true Christian. You may not know that I offered him a position which would have led to high titles of nobility from the King of Siam, to the governorship of a large province, and to a large increase in his income. Yet he declined these honors and financial benefits that he might continue in the service of Jesus Christ." The school and church Boon Tuan founded still exist.

== Bibliography ==
- "Boon Tuan Boon Itt" in A Dictionary of Asian Christianity, ed. Scott Sunquist, Eerdmans Publishing Co., Grand Rapids, 2001, p. 90.
- Brain, Belle M., Boon-Itt, A Christian Leader of Asia, Missionary Review of the World, May 1912, p. 327-335
- McFarland, George, ed. Historical Sketch of Protestant Missions in Siam 1828-1928, White Lotus Press, Bangkok, Thailand, 2008, p. 290-295.
- Eakin, John A., Boon-It in Siam. New York: Women's Board of Foreign Missions of the Presbyterian Church, n.d.
- Kim Heng Mungkrphun, "A Short Biography of Kru Boon Itt," Church News 1 (Nov 1932) (in Thai)
- Wattana Wittaya Academy School Museum, Along the Road: From Wanglang School to Wattana Wittaya Academy
