= Anne McGrew Bennett =

American writer and feminist (1903–1986)

Anne McGrew Bennett (November 24, 1903 – October 19, 1986) was an American writer and feminist. She was the first woman invited to give a commencement address at the Union Theological Seminary.

== Biography ==
Bennett was born in Lincoln County, Nebraska, to a family of Scotch-Irish homesteaders, in a sod house. She was raised a member of the Christian Church (Disciples of Christ), and religion played a large role in her life. After high school, she became a teacher in a rural school before taking a degree in elementary education from the University of Nebraska in 1928.

Three years later, she married John C. Bennett; in 1923 she received her MA in religious education from Auburn Seminary. John took teaching positions at various seminaries, and the couple moved back and forth between California and New York. Later in life Anne became a Congregationalist, and began to take an active role in a variety of committees and organizations; she also addressed issues of social justice. Notably, she was a feminist, writing over 60 articles on feminist theology and serving as co-editor of the volume Women in a Strange Land.

She also spoke for peace and against the Vietnam War; she traveled to South Vietnam to discuss peace, and took letters to prisoners of war held in North Vietnam. She was the first woman invited to give a commencement address at the Union Theological Seminary; the school later awarded her its Union Medal for her service to the United Church of Christ. Bennett died in Claremont, California. A collection of her papers is held by the Graduate Theological Union; others are held by the Union Theological Seminary.
