= Isaac J. Rice =

Canadian politician

Isaac J. Rice (1808–February 20, 1880) was a minister and missionary for fugitive slaves from the United States. He operated a mission for arriving black people and a large school for black children at Fort Malden at Amherstburg, Ontario. It was a major landing point for African Americans and the main station of the American Missionary Association.

== Personal life and education ==
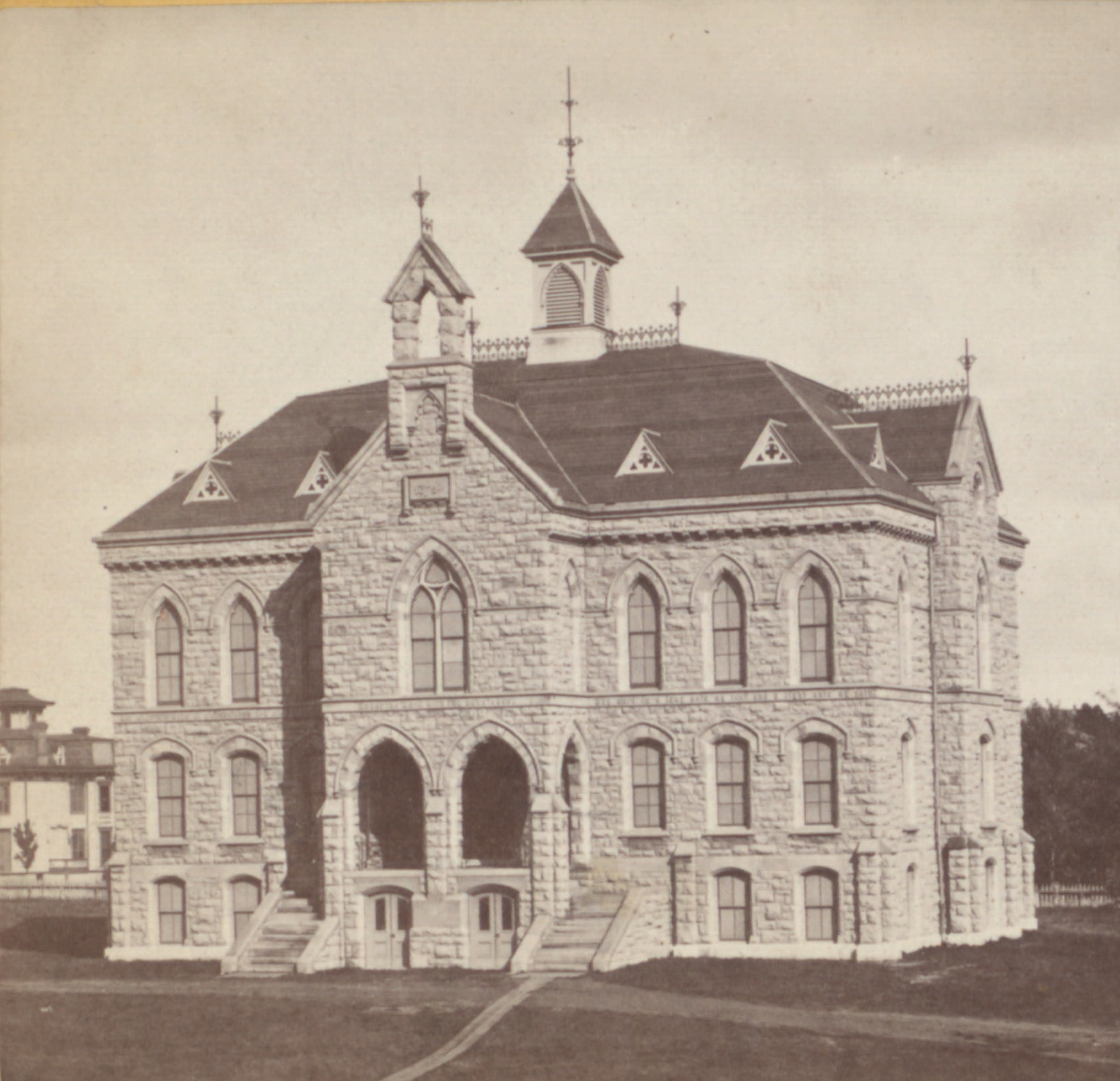
Auburn Theological Seminary

Rice was from Wayne, Ohio. He studied at Hamilton College in the Class of 1833, as did Hiram Wilson, who also became a missionary in Ontario. Rice was a member of the Junior class of the Auburn Theological Seminary in New York. He was in Vienna, Ohio in 1836. Rice was a pastor of the Presbyterian Church from Ohio. He was married to Sarah Alden Carpenter and had a son, Benjamin Bartlett Rice.

== Missionary ==
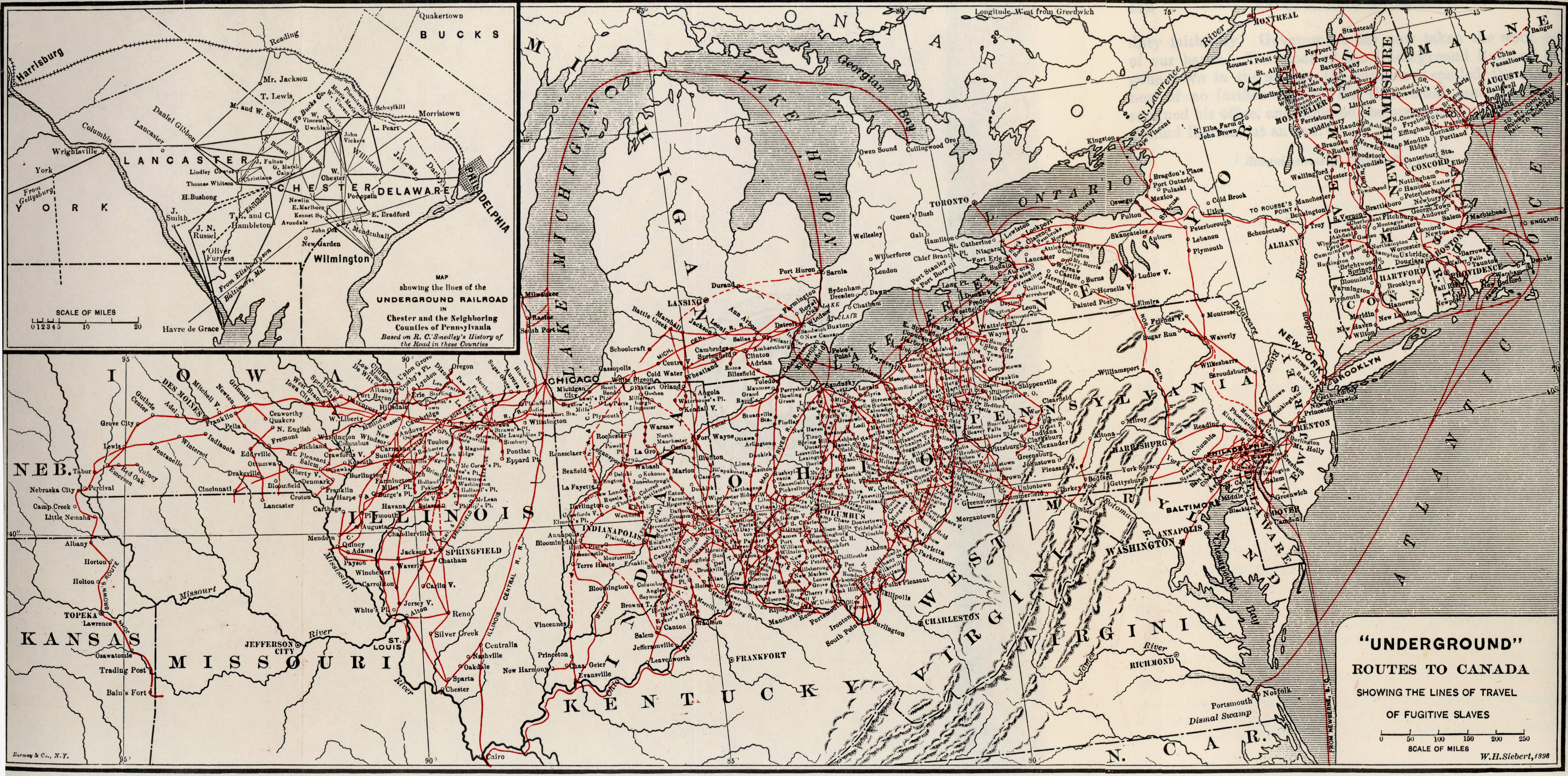
Underground Railroad routes. Amherstburg is south of Detroit on the Detroit River

About 1848 or 1849, Rice went to Amherstburg as a missionary. He ran a mission for former slaves and a large school for negro children at Fort Malden in Amherstburg (often the name of the town and the fort were switched). (Note: In general, teachers came from the United States, Canadians would not teach black children.) He was a pastor, teacher, and a missionary who provided food and clothing. He helped people by writing letters for them and mediating debates.

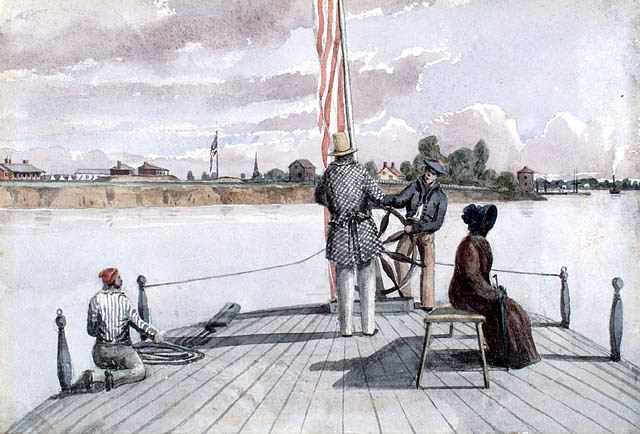
View of Amherstburg, Upper Canada

At Amherstburg, lake boats and ferries arrived with as many as 15 people per boat, having crossed the Detroit River from the United States. In and after 1850, that number had doubled with the passage of the Fugitive Slave Act of 1850. Immigrants included recent runaway slaves as well as people who had lived free in the north but were afraid of being returned to slavery. The fugitives arrived impoverished, illiterate, and neglected from years of slavery. Rice kept a supply of goods that fugitives might need, including clothing. It was a major Underground Railroad landing point for fugitive slaves, which he sheltered until homes could be found for them. Entire families arrived, all needing care.

It appears from all this that the recognition of the deplorable destitution of arriving fugitives was general among the aid societies and their representatives, and that prompt action was taken to meet wants that could brook no delay.

— Wilbur Siebert, The Underground Railroad: From Slavery to Freedom

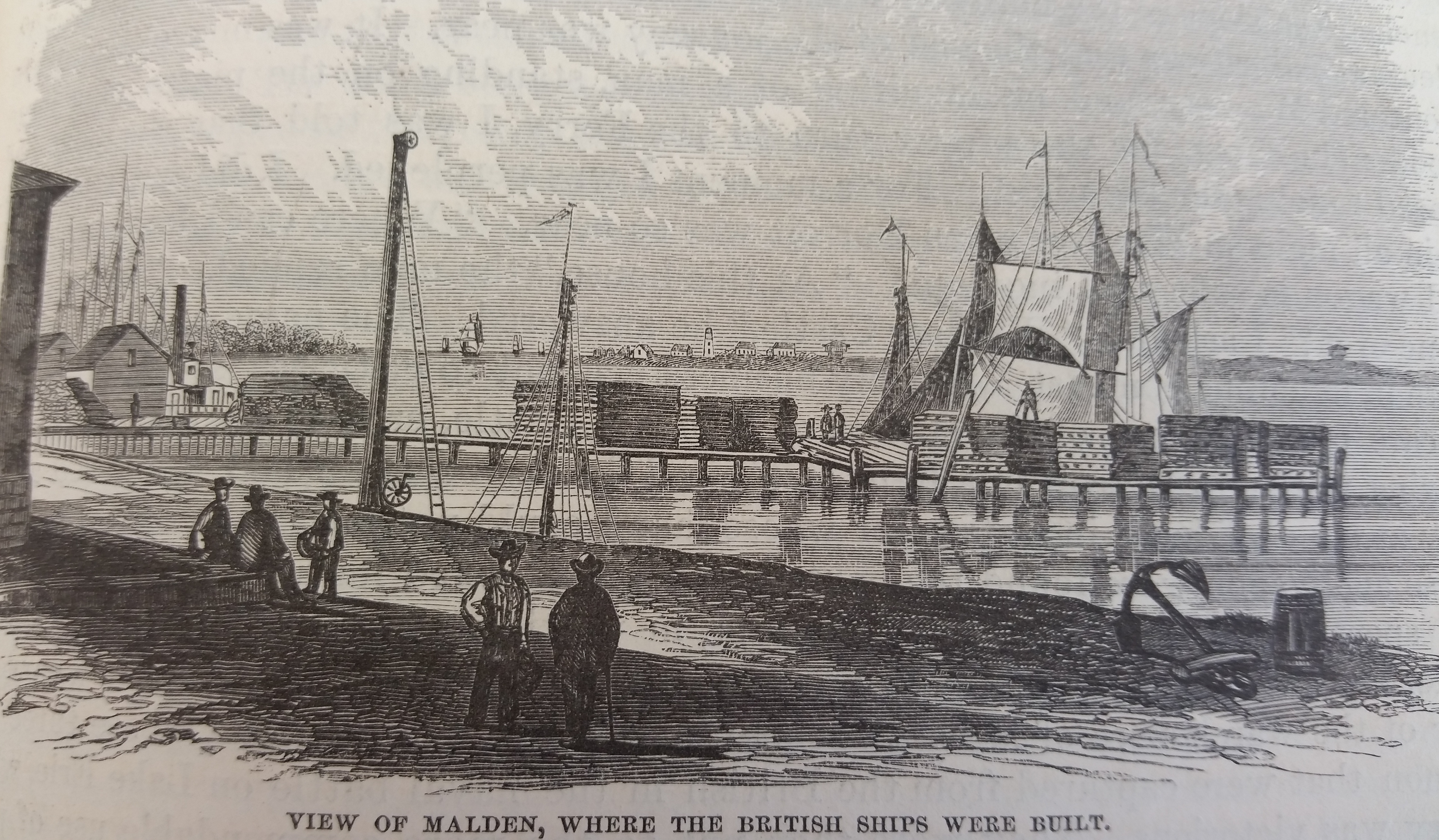
Malden, Amherstburg, Ontario

Levi Coffin described Rice as someone who performed "devoted, self-denying work, and had received very little pecuniary help, and had suffered many privations." By 1849, the mission was out of funds. He was not able to pay for the freight charges for supplies, while many people at the mission were in dire need of clothing. He provided beans and bread to feed people. He needed to sell beds and his watch for food. Of the 20,000 black people in Canada, 3,000 lived near him. In 1852, he printed 5,000 copies of the Amherstburg Quarterly Mission Journal, asking for donations for bedding, clothing, and provisions. In 1855, the mission and all of the contents were ruined in a fire. Rice wrote an appeal for donations that was published in newspapers.

== Pastor ==
Around 1866, Elder Isaac John Rice was pastor for one year at Westover Baptist Church in Westover, Ontario. In 1871, he was the interim preacher and after three years, he accepted the position of pastor. Rice held revival meetings five to seven times a week in April and May, 1877. This led to 90 baptisms in one two-week period and 122 new members over the year. Due to ill health, he resigned in 1877. He died of inflammation of the lungs on February 20, 1880. He was buried in Westover Cemetery, with a gravestone inscription of: "For 14 years pastor of the Baptist Church, Westover."

== See also ==
- Refugee Home Society
- List of Underground Railroad sites
