= Westover, Ontario =

Westover
- Hamlet / village
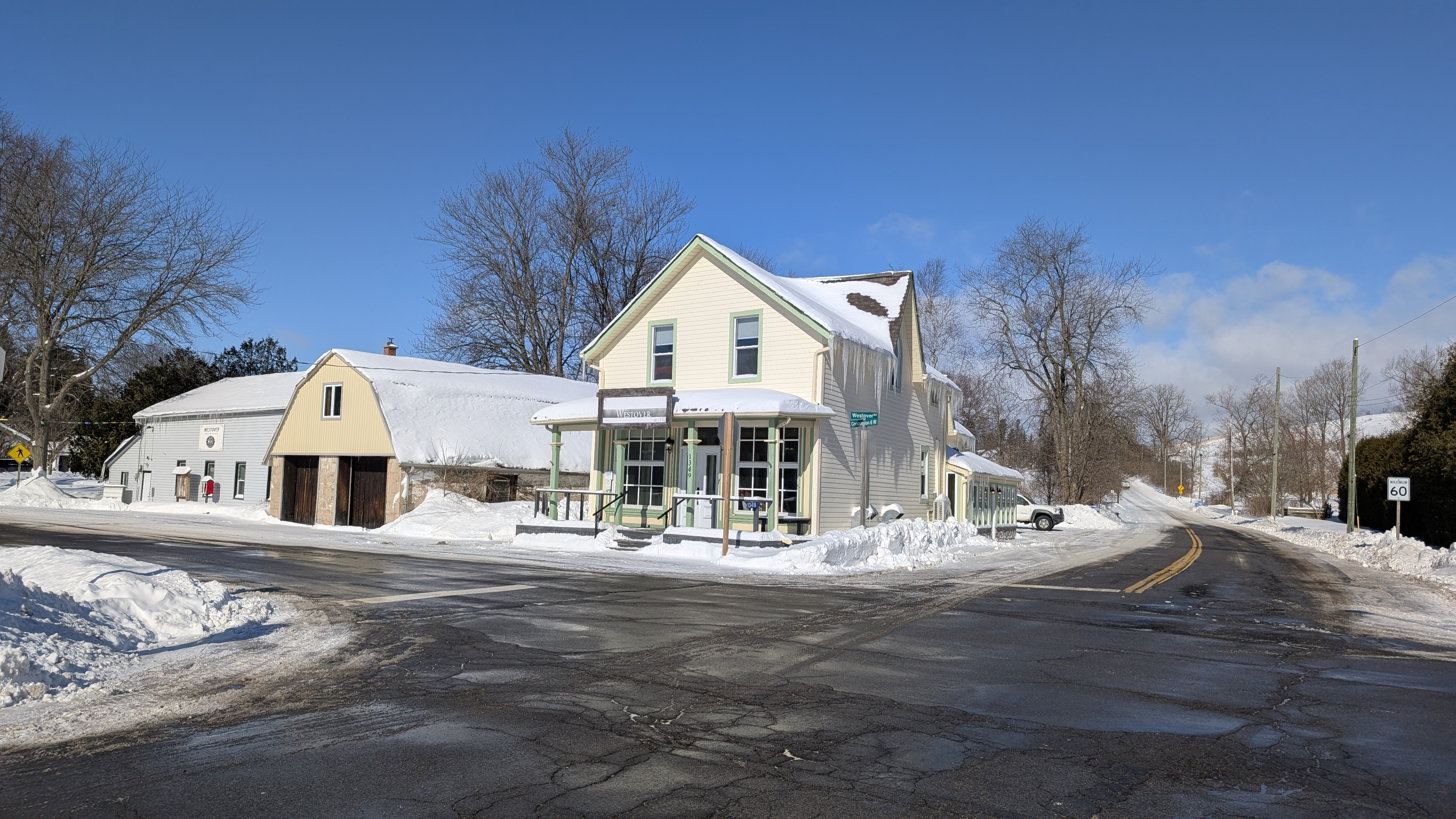

- Location within Ontario
- Country: Canada
- Province: Ontario
- County: Hamilton, Ontario

Westover, Ontario is a hamlet west of Flamborough in Hamilton, Ontario. In the late 18th century the area was known as Donnybrook (distinct from Donnybrook, Ontario in Huron County). One of the first settlers was William Reid, who arrived in the area in 1798. He sold his land to John Westover in 1828. In 1830, Westover returned with his wife Lydia Havens to settle in Donnybrook. They were both Baptists. The town was likely named for him, since he had established a post office on his land and at his expense in 1835. In 1845, they established the Second Regular Baptist Church of Beverley, which is now the Westover Baptist Church.

By 1869, it had saw, shingle, and grist mills and a blacksmith and wagon maker. The village had two general merchants, a teacher, physician, hotel operator, post master, and Rev. H. Smith was a minister of a Methodist Episcopal Church.

== Notable people ==
- Reuben Rupert Jamieson (1856–1911) born in Westover, was the 16th mayor of Calgary, Alberta
- Isaac J. Rice (1808–February 20, 1880) was a minister and missionary for fugitive enslaved people before the American Civil War, after which he was a pastor for the Westover Baptist Church and was buried in the Westover Cemetery

== See also ==
- Oil sands
- List of pipeline accidents
