= David Riddle Breed =

American Presbyterian clergyman (1848–1931)

- Born: June 10, 1848; Pittsburgh, Pennsylvania
- Died: December 11, 1931
- Occupation(s): American Presbyterian clergyman and educator

David Riddle Breed (June 10, 1848 – December 11, 1931) was an American Presbyterian clergyman and educator, born in Pittsburgh, Pennsylvania.

He graduated at Hamilton College in 1867 and at Auburn Theological Seminary (Presbyterian) in 1870. He held pastorates in St. Paul and Chicago until 1894, when he was called to the First Presbyterian Church of Pittsburgh.

In 1898 he became Professor of Practical Theology in Western Theological Seminary, Allegheny, Pa. He identified himself prominently with his denomination's Board of Missions for Freedmen.

Among his publications are many tracts, notably More Light, which has a wide circulation; works on hymnody, especially the frequently reprinted History and Use of Hymns and Hymn Tunes; Abraham, the Typical Life of Faith (1886); History of the Preparation of the World for Christ (1891); Preparing to Preach (1911).

== Death and interment ==
He died on December 11, 1931, and was buried at the Oakhill Cemetery in Grand Rapids, Michigan.
