= Somerset, Nebraska =

Unincorporated community in Nebraska, U.S.

Coordinates: 40°49′31″N 100°51′40″W

Somerset is an unincorporated community in Lincoln County, Nebraska, United States.

== History ==
A post office was established at Somerset in 1887, and remained in operation until it was discontinued in 1944. The community was likely named after the town of Somerset, Massachusetts.
