= Auburn Theological Seminary =

Presbyterian school

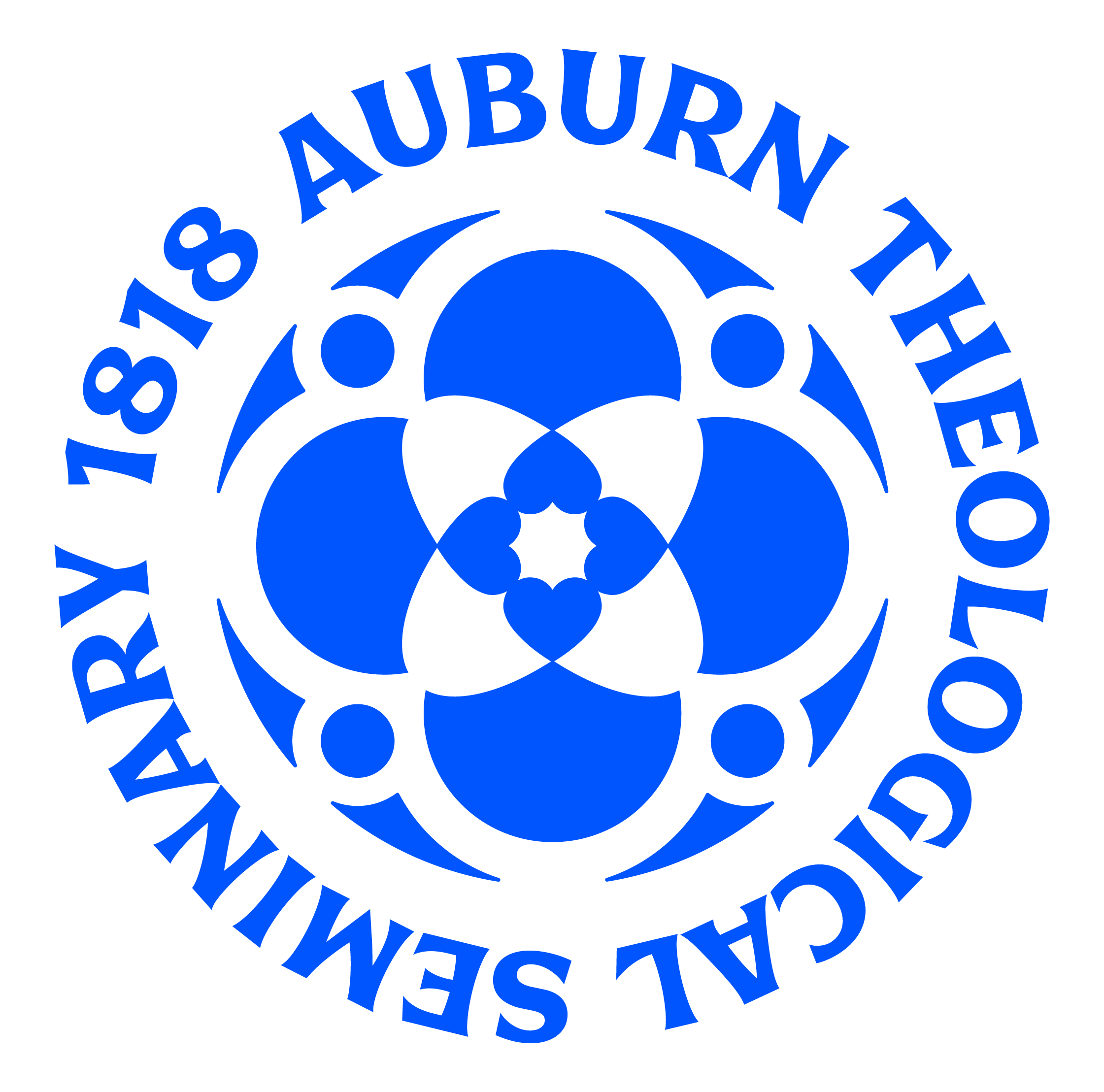
- Founded: August 16, 1818; 208 years ago
- Type: 501(c)(3) charitable organization
- Tax ID no.: 15-0532053
- Purpose: To identify and equip leaders – from the pulpit to the public square – to build communities, bridge divides, pursue justice, and heal the world.
- Location(s): 475 Riverside Drive, Suite 1270, New York, New York 10115, United States
- Coordinates: 40.810789°N 73.963749°W
- Method: Education, Research
- President: Rev. Patrick B. Reyes, Ph.D.
- Website: www.auburnseminary.org

Auburn Theological Seminary is a seminary in New York City. It has not offered academic degrees since 1939.

The seminary was established in Auburn, New York, in 1818 to prepare young ministers for the frontier. In 1939, weakened by the Great Depression, the seminary relocated from Auburn to the Union Theological Seminary's campus in New York City, although it maintained its independence from Union Theological Seminary. In 2014, it designed and moved to a new leadership development lab in The Interchurch Center in Morningside Heights, Manhattan, New York City.

Auburn Theological Seminary houses a research center focused on the study of seminaries, divinity schools, and the preparation of faith leaders working for social justice.

It was one of the first seminaries in the country to admit African Americans (Moses A. Hopkins, 1877), Japanese (Naoomi Tamura, 1882) and later, female seminarians (Ida Thorne Parker, 1917).

== History ==
Auburn Theological Seminary was established in Auburn, New York, by action of the Presbyterian Synod of Geneva on 16 August 1818. It obtained a charter from the New York State legislature on 14 April 1820 as a post-baccalaureate theological seminary, and it matriculated its first students in 1821. From its inception, the seminary drew support from beyond the Presbyterian Church. Its charter stipulated that "no student of any Christian denomination shall be excluded," and the first class of eleven students represented eight denominations. The first Roman Catholic Bishop of Boston, Jean-Louis Cheverus, donated books for the school's library.

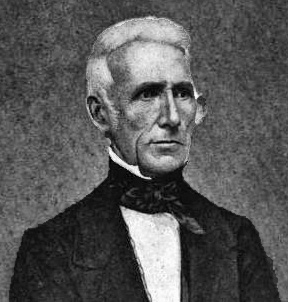
Dirck Cornelius Lansing, Founder and Professor, 1821–1826

The school's founders and early faculty (Dirck Lansing, Matthew Perrine, and Henry Mills) rejected sterner forms of Calvinism and advocated for flexible church governance within the Presbyterian Church. These beliefs became known as the Auburn Declaration of 1837.

Under the presidency of George Black Stewart (1899–1926), the school grew to 105 students and eleven faculty. A Summer School of Theology for clergy and laity was established in 1911, and a School of Religious Education in 1921.

Auburn Theological Seminary's faculty, led by Robert Hastings Nichols, professor of church history, played a key role in what became known as the Auburn Affirmation, adopted in 1924, which defended theological freedom and prevented a fundamentalist takeover of the Presbyterian Church.

The Great Depression left Auburn Seminary with a diminished student body and strained resources. The faculty and President Paul Silas Heath (1936–1939) began conversations with several seminaries about possibly relocating. In 1939, it closed its Auburn campus and at the invitation of President Henry Sloan Coffin, moved to the campus of Union Theological Seminary in New York City, although it maintained its board of trustees and endowment.

With the move to Union Theological Seminary, Auburn Theological Seminary ceased granting degrees, instead developing new initiatives: a Program of Training for Rural Ministry in 1944, which continued its emphasis on preparing individuals for the practice of ministry, not for theological specialization; in 1964 the Center for Continuing Education was established as well as the Experimental Program for the Practice of Christian Ministry; in 1968 Auburn Studies in Theological Education was begun; in 1971 the Susquehanna Valley Project to support local ministers started; in 1985 interreligious programs for faith leaders were developed and in 1991 The Center for the Study of Theological Education was established.

Auburn is currently located in New York at the Interchurch Center. Auburn's programs under Rev. Dr. Emma Jordan-Simpson include the Janet Prindle Seidler Center for Prophetic Leadership, Center for Storytelling and Narrative Change, and the Center for Research. Auburn Research explores the needs of theological institutions, their leaders and students, and the ways in which leaders of faith and moral courage are affecting positive social change in society and was permanently endowed by Lilly Endowment Inc. in 2007. More information can be found on the institution's website auburnseminary.org.

== Presidents of Auburn Theological Seminary ==
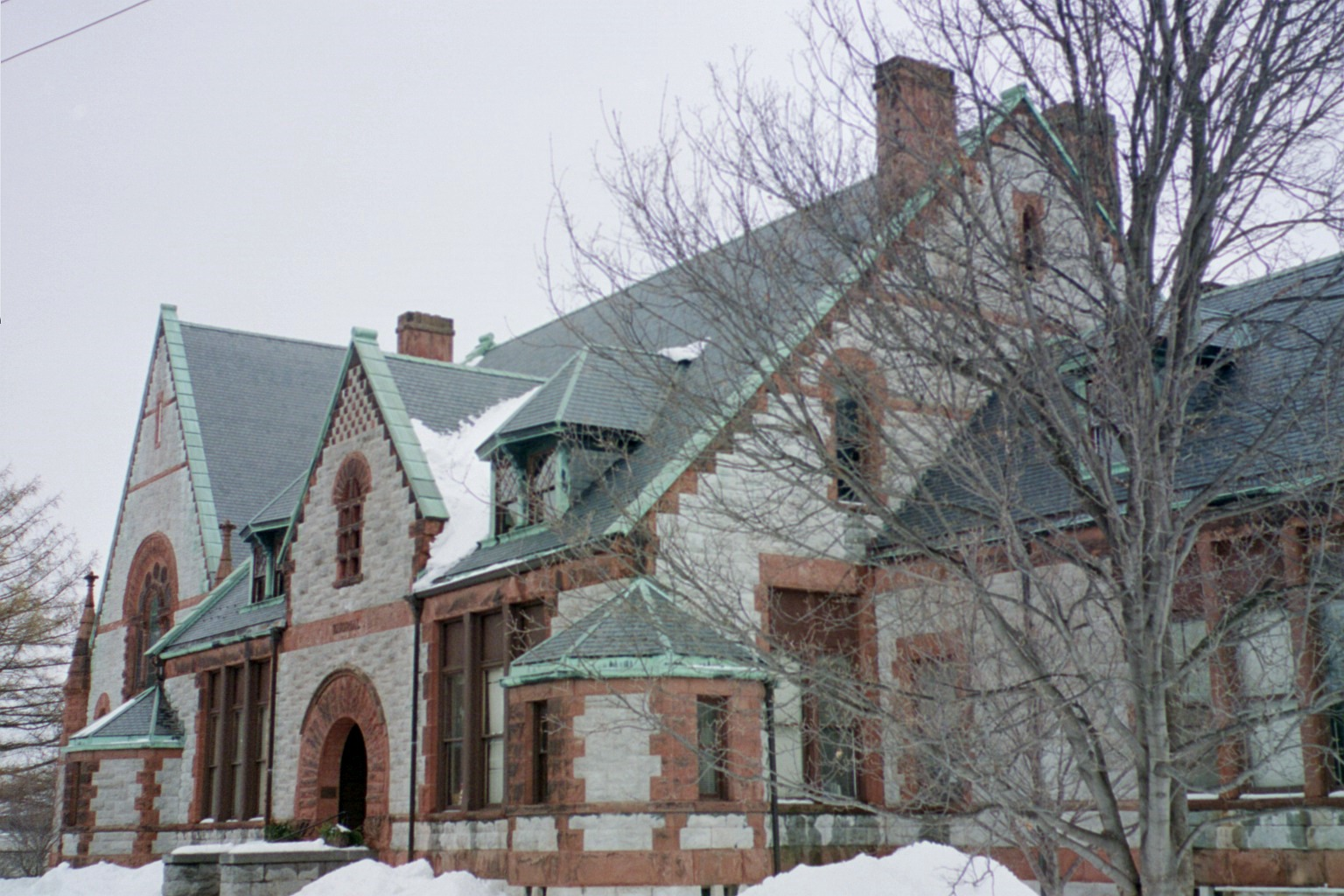
Former buildings from 1892

No.	Name	Term
1 (Note: Prior to 1892, the seminary was directed by faculty and the board.)	Henry Matthias Booth	1892–1898
2	George Black Stewart	1898–1926
3	Harry Lathrop Reed	1926–1936
4	Paul Silas Heath	1936–1939
5 (Note: As executive director)	Walter S. Davison	1939–1944
6	Henry Sloane Coffin (Note: Between 1944 and 1963, Auburn Seminary shared its president with Union Seminary.)	1944–1945
7	Henry P. Van Dusen	1945–1963
8 (Note: As dean)	Robert W. Lynn	1963–1975
9	Barbara G. Wheeler	1979–2009
10	Katharine Rhodes Henderson	2009–2021
11	Emma Jordan-Simpson	2021–2026
12	Patrick B. Reyes	2026–Present

== Notable alumni ==
- Maltbie Davenport Babcock (1858–1901)
- Dwight Baldwin (1798–1886)
- Anne McGrew Bennett (1903–1986)
- David Riddle Breed (1848–1931)
- Henry Roe Cloud (1884–1950)
- Titus Coan (1801–1881)
- Sheldon Dibble (1809–1845)
- Justus Doolittle (1824–1880)
- Photius Fisk (1809–1890)
- Josiah Bushnell Grinnell (1821–1891)
- Charles Frederic Goss (1852–1930)
- Laurentine Hamilton (1826–1882)
- Joel T. Headley (1813–1897)
- Moses A. Hopkins (1846–1886)
- Herrick Johnson (1832–1913)
- George William Knox (1853–1912)
- Lorenzo Lyons (1807–1886)
- Isaac J. Rice (1808–1880)
- Edward Payson Roe (1838–1888)
- Devello Z. Sheffield (1841–1913)
- John Lawrence Thurston (1874–1904)
- Boon Tuan Boon-Itt (1865–1903), an early leader in the Protestant Christian community of Thailand
- Guido Verbeck (1830–1898)

== Notable faculty ==
- James A. Forbes (born 1935)
- Laurens Perseus Hickok (1798–1888)
- William Greenough Thayer Shedd (1820–1894)
- Walter Wink (1976-2005)

== See also ==
- List of defunct colleges and universities in New York
