= Padoongrasdra School =

School in Thailand

Coordinates: 16.824668°N 100.266506°E

Padoongrasdra School (pronounced pa*doong*raht) is a K-12 school located in central Phitsanulok, Thailand. It presently operates under the local municipality of Private School Education Office #1. It has approximately 3,000 students and 160 teachers.

Padoongrasdra School was established in 1899 by Presbyterian missionaries from abroad working with a Thai doctor named Buntuan Bun-it. When it first opened, the school had 40 students in a building just six meters big. In order to expand, donations were solicited from the governor as well as local community members. One wealthy resident, named Choey, donated 4,000 baht to build the school’s first building, which is where the current Nasesuan army camp is located. In 1910, Dr. Boontuan and his wife moved back to Bangkok. By this time, the number of students had grown exponentially, and it was decided to create two separate schools: one for boys and one for girls. The girls remained at the original school site under the name Padoongnaree while the boys moved to a new location, which is where the current Phitsanulok City Hall now stands. Leadership was important and, in 1925, the school brought on its first principal, Mr. Sarun Chairat. In 1926, the city government needed the school’s land in order to create welcoming grounds for the king. In return for seizure of the land, the government helped to find new grounds where the school could continue. The new property that was obtained is the site of the current school grounds.

The school remained governed by foreign missionaries until 1934, when control was given over to the Church of Christ in Thailand(CCT). Also during this time, the boys and girls schools joined together and adopted the name under current use, Padoongrasdra School. The school continued to grow and through the Fifty Million Fund, operated by the CCT in America, eight new buildings were constructed on campus: a library, canteen, kindergarten building, meeting hall, main office building, science building, music room, and a three-story concrete building with 21 classrooms. Alumni also contributed to this building project by giving funding for the fence and signs around the school, paving the inner school grounds, constructing a football field and basketball court, and erecting the flag pole.

Upon the retirement in 1985 of Mr. Chairat, CCT assigned Mr. Mana Sutjaritjit as principal. Under his leadership, the first Parents and Teachers Association was formed on campus in 1988. In 1993, a fire broke out in the wooden primary school building, destroying the classrooms. The new building opened in 1995 and is still in use to this day. 1998 saw more advancement as construction began on new kindergarten and main office buildings, which opened in 2005. In 2008, Mr. Sutjaritjit retired from his position and the school brought on Mr. Parinya Tawinno, the current director. Most recently, in 2011, the CCT and the school board decided to build a new canteen, which seats up to 1,000 students and has shops with food for purchase.
