= Lincoln County, Nebraska =

County in Nebraska, United States

- County
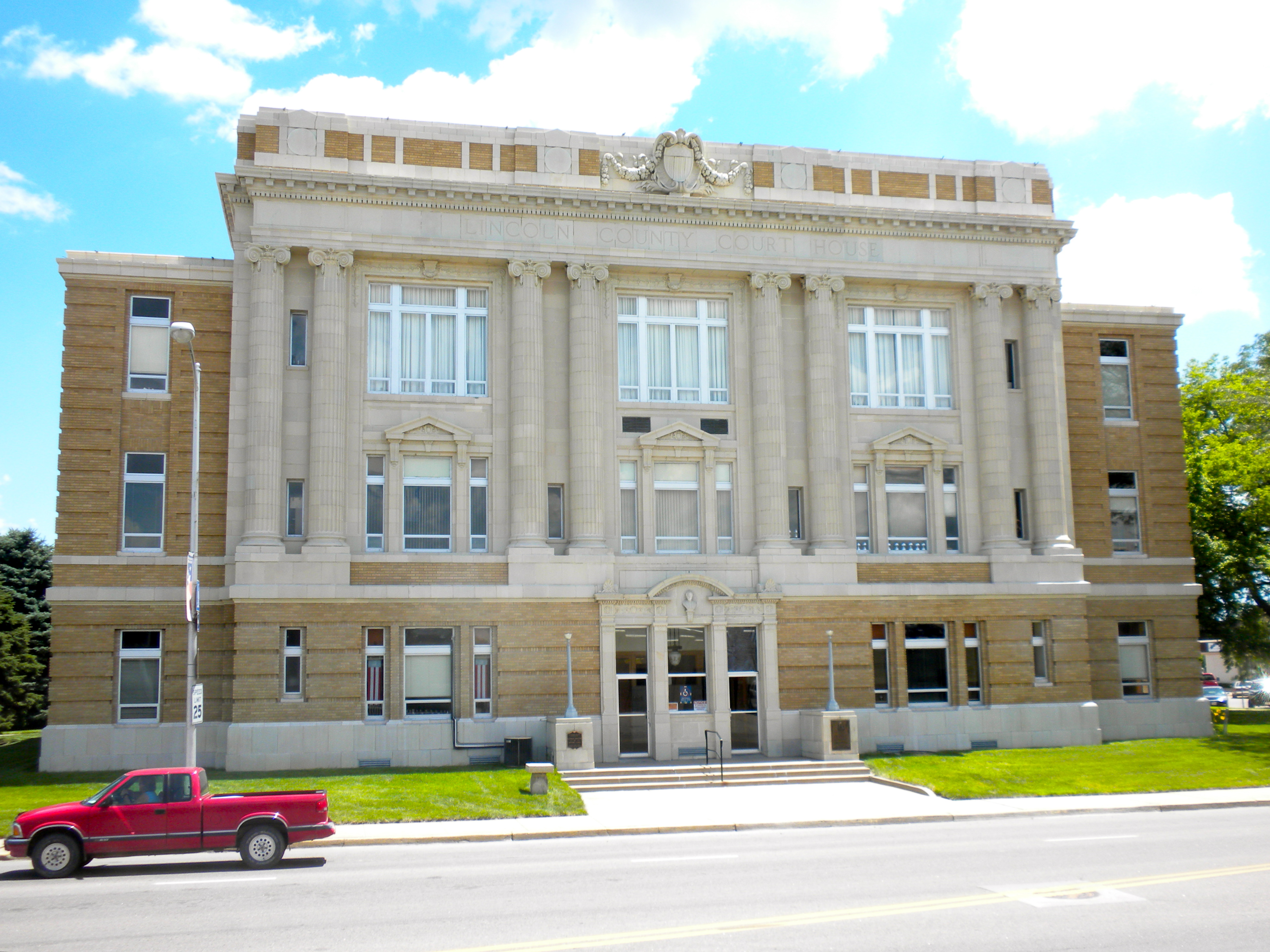
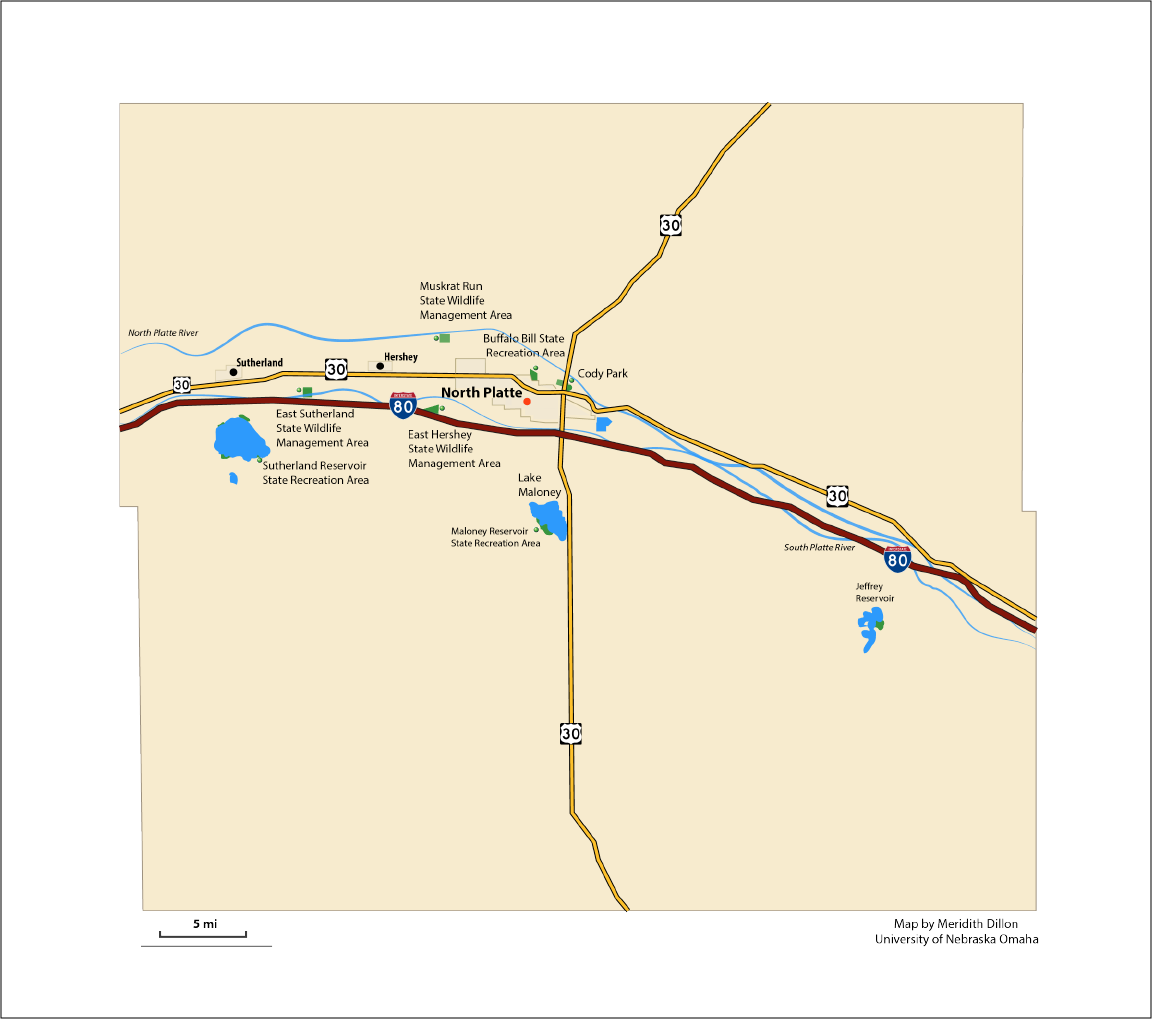
- The Lincoln County Courthouse in North Platte Lincoln County, Nebraska

- Location within the U.S. state of Nebraska
- Coordinates: 41.0503°N 100.7445°W
- Country: United States
- State: Nebraska
- Founded: January 7, 1860
- Named for: Abraham Lincoln
- Seat: North Platte
- Largest city: North Platte

Area
  - Total: 2,575.119 sq mi (6,669.53 km^{2})
  - Land: 2,564.155 sq mi (6,641.13 km^{2})
  - Water: 10.964 sq mi (28.40 km^{2}) 0.43%

Population (2020)
  - Total: 34,676
  - Estimate (2025): 33,303 ▼
  - Density: 13.523/sq mi (5.2214/km^{2})
- Time zone: UTC−6 (Central)
  - Summer (DST): UTC−5 (CDT)
- Area code: 308
- Congressional district: 3rd
- Website: lincolncountyne.gov
- • Nebraska county number 56 • Nebraska license plate prefix 15

Lincoln County is a county located in the U.S. state of Nebraska. As of the 2020 census, the population was 34,676, and was estimated to be 33,303 in 2025. The county seat and the largest city is North Platte.

Despite the county's name, the state capital city of Lincoln is not in or near Lincoln County.

Lincoln County is one of the three counties in the North Platte micropolitan area.

In the Nebraska license plate system, Lincoln County was represented by the prefix "15" (as it had the 15th-largest number of vehicles registered in the state when the license plate system was established in 1922).

== History ==
Lincoln County was created on January 7, 1860; it was named for Abraham Lincoln.

== Geography ==
Lincoln County is located in the Nebraska Sandhills, a region of mixed-grass prairie on grass-stabilized dunes. The land is generally given to agriculture, with considerable center pivot irrigation and cattle ranching. The North Platte River and the South Platte River flow eastward from Keith County, joining to form the Platte River east of the city of North Platte in central Lincoln County. The Platte then flows ESE out of the county.

According to the United States Census Bureau, the county has a total area of 2,575.119 square miles (6,669.53 km^{2}), of which 2,564.155 square miles (6,641.13 km^{2}) is land and 10.964 square miles (28.40 km^{2}) (0.43%) is water. It is the third-largest county in Nebraska by total area.

Most of Nebraska's 93 counties (the eastern 2/3, including Lincoln County) observe Central Time; the western counties observe Mountain Time. Lincoln County is the westernmost of the Nebraska counties to entirely observe Central Time.

=== Major highways ===
- Interstate 80
- U.S. Highway 30
- U.S. Highway 83
- Nebraska Highway 23
- Nebraska Highway 25
- Nebraska Highway 97

=== Transit ===
- Burlington Trailways
- Express Arrow

=== Adjacent counties ===
- McPherson County – northwest
- Logan County – northeast
- Custer County – east
- Dawson County – east
- Frontier County – southeast
- Hayes County – southwest
- Perkins County – west (boundary of Mountain Time)
- Keith County – west (boundary of Mountain Time)

=== Protected areas ===
- Birdwood Lake State Wildlife Management Area
- East Hershey State Wildlife Management Area
- East Sutherland State Wildlife Management Area
- Fort McPherson National Cemetery
- Jeffrey Canyon State Wildlife Management Area
- Maloney Reservoir State Recreation Area
- Muskrat Run State Wildlife Management Area
- Platte State Wildlife Management Area
- Sutherland Reservoir State Recreation Area

== Demographics ==
Historical population
Census	Pop.	Note	%±
1870	17		—
1880	3,632		21,264.7%
1890	10,441		187.5%
1900	11,416		9.3%
1910	15,684		37.4%
1920	23,420		49.3%
1930	25,627		9.4%
1940	25,425		−0.8%
1950	27,380		7.7%
1960	28,491		4.1%
1970	29,538		3.7%
1980	36,455		23.4%
1990	32,508		−10.8%
2000	34,632		6.5%
2010	36,288		4.8%
2020	34,676		−4.4%
2025 (est.)	33,303	▼	−4.0%
U.S. Decennial Census; 1790–1960 1900–1990; 1990–2000 2010–2020

As of the third quarter of 2025, the median home value in Lincoln County was $204,276.

As of the 2024 American Community Survey, there are 14,890 estimated households in Lincoln County with an average of 2.23 persons per household. The county has a median household income of $65,148. Approximately 12.4% of the county's population lives at or below the poverty line. Lincoln County has an estimated 62.2% employment rate, with 22.7% of the population holding a bachelor's degree or higher and 94.2% holding a high school diploma. There were 16,624 housing units at an average density of 6.48 per square mile (2.5/km^{2}).

The top five reported languages (people were allowed to report up to two languages, thus the figures will generally add to more than 100%) were English (94.9%), Spanish (3.7%), Indo-European (1.1%), Asian and Pacific Islander (0.1%), and Other (0.2%).

The median age in the county was 42.4 years.

Lincoln County, Nebraska – racial and ethnic composition Note: the US Census treats Hispanic/Latino as an ethnic category. This table excludes Latinos from the racial categories and assigns them to a separate category. Hispanics/Latinos may be of any race.
Race / ethnicity (NH = non-Hispanic)	Pop. 1980	Pop. 1990	Pop. 2000	Pop. 2010	Pop. 2020
White alone (NH)	34,597 (94.90%)	30,561 (94.01%)	32,072 (92.61%)	32,741 (90.23%)	29,643 (85.49%)
Black or African American alone (NH)	98 (0.27%)	90 (0.28%)	179 (0.52%)	235 (0.65%)	382 (1.10%)
Native American or Alaska Native alone (NH)	92 (0.25%)	108 (0.33%)	137 (0.40%)	162 (0.45%)	147 (0.42%)
Asian alone (NH)	138 (0.38%)	111 (0.34%)	129 (0.37%)	192 (0.53%)	325 (0.94%)
Pacific Islander alone (NH)	—	—	2 (0.01%)	5 (0.01%)	6 (0.02%)
Other race alone (NH)	11 (0.03%)	15 (0.05%)	5 (0.01%)	19 (0.05%)	111 (0.32%)
Mixed race or multiracial (NH)	—	—	228 (0.66%)	332 (0.91%)	1,051 (3.03%)
Hispanic or Latino (any race)	1,519 (4.17%)	1,623 (4.99%)	1,880 (5.43%)	2,602 (7.17%)	3,011 (8.68%)
Total	36,455 (100.00%)	32,508 (100.00%)	34,632 (100.00%)	36,288 (100.00%)	34,676 (100.00%)

=== 2024 estimate ===
As of the 2024 estimate, there were 33,319 people, 14,890 households, and _ families residing in the county. The population density was 12.99 inhabitants per square mile (5.0/km^{2}). There were 16,624 housing units at an average density of 6.48 per square mile (2.5/km^{2}). The racial makeup of the county was 93.9% White (85.8% NH White), 1.5% African American, 1.3% Native American, 0.8% Asian, 0.1% Pacific Islander, _% from some other races and 2.4% from two or more races. Hispanic or Latino people of any race were 9.7% of the population.

=== 2020 census ===
As of the 2020 census, there were 34,676 people, 14,683 households, and 9,208 families residing in the county. The population density was 13.52 inhabitants per square mile (5.2/km^{2}). There were 16,526 housing units at an average density of 6.45 per square mile (2.5/km^{2}). The racial makeup of the county was 88.47% White, 1.23% African American, 0.62% Native American, 0.94% Asian, 0.02% Pacific Islander, 2.71% from some other races and 6.02% from two or more races. Hispanic or Latino people of any race were 8.68% of the population.

There were 14,683 households in the county, of which 28.0% had children under the age of 18 living with them and 24.5% had a female householder with no spouse or partner present. About 31.8% of all households were made up of individuals and 14.0% had someone living alone who was 65 years of age or older.

The median age was 41.4 years. 23.4% of residents were under the age of 18 and 20.2% of residents were 65 years of age or older. For every 100 females there were 99.3 males, and for every 100 females age 18 and over there were 97.9 males age 18 and over. Among occupied housing units, 68.0% were owner-occupied and 32.0% were renter-occupied. The homeowner vacancy rate was 2.1% and the rental vacancy rate was 11.7%. 68.0% of residents lived in urban areas, while 32.0% lived in rural areas.

=== 2010 census ===
As of the 2010 census, there were 36,288 people, 15,025 households, and 10,116 families residing in the county. The population density was 14.15 inhabitants per square mile (5.5/km^{2}). There were 16,583 housing units at an average density of 6.47 per square mile (2.5/km^{2}). The racial makeup of the county was 94.33% White, 0.72% African American, 0.59% Native American, 0.55% Asian, 0.02% Pacific Islander, 2.35% from some other races and 1.44% from two or more races. Hispanic or Latino people of any race were 7.17% of the population.

=== 2000 census ===
As of the 2000 census, there were 34,632 people, 14,076 households, and 9,444 families residing in the county. The population density was 13.51 inhabitants per square mile (5.2/km^{2}). There were 15,438 housing units at an average density of 6.02 per square mile (2.3/km^{2}). The racial makeup of the county was 94.70% White, 0.54% African American, 0.51% Native American, 0.37% Asian, 0.02% Pacific Islander, 2.65% from some other races and 1.21% from two or more races. Hispanic or Latino people of any race were 5.43% of the population.

There were 14,076 households, out of which 32.00% had children under the age of 18 living with them, 55.90% were married couples living together, 8.00% had a female householder with no husband present, and 32.90% were non-families. 28.30% of all households were made up of individuals, and 11.60% had someone living alone who was 65 years of age or older. The average household size was 2.41 and the average family size was 2.97.

The county population contained 26.20% under the age of 18, 8.30% from 18 to 24, 26.60% from 25 to 44, 23.80% from 45 to 64, and 15.10% who were 65 years of age or older. The median age was 38 years. For every 100 females, there were 96.50 males. For every 100 females age 18 and over, there were 93.40 males.

The median income for a household in the county was $36,568, and the median income for a family was $45,185. Males had a median income of $36,244 versus $20,252 for females. The per capita income for the county was $18,696. About 7.20% of families and 9.70% of the population were below the poverty line, including 12.10% of those under age 18 and 9.30% of those age 65 or over.

== Communities ==
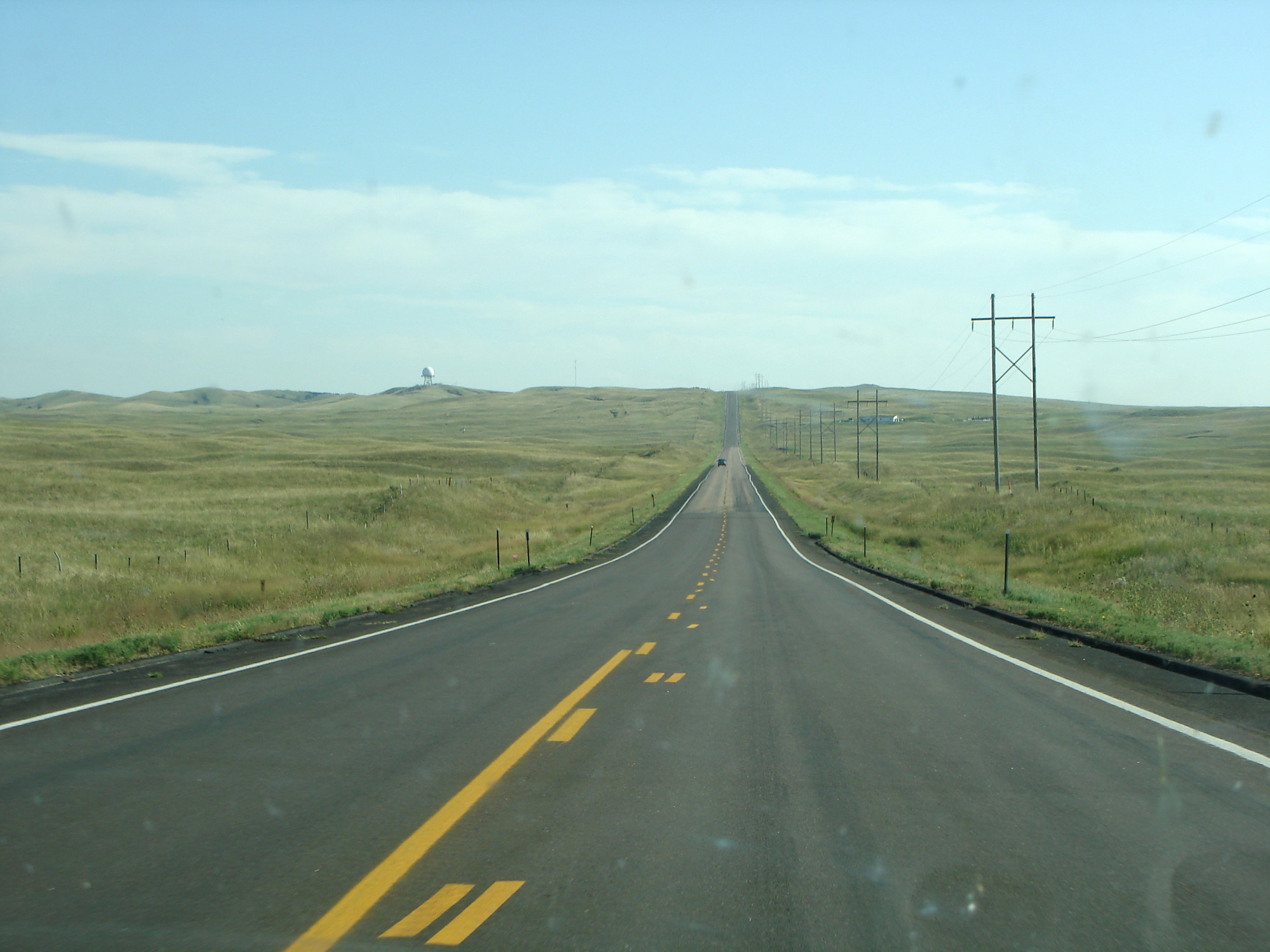
Rural highway in Lincoln County

=== City ===
- North Platte (county seat)

=== Villages ===
- Brady
- Hershey
- Maxwell
- Sutherland
- Wallace
- Wellfleet

=== Unincorporated communities ===
- Dickens
- Somerset

== Politics ==
Lincoln County voters generally vote Republican. In only three national elections since 1916 has the county selected the Democratic Party candidate, most recently in 1964 in the midst of Lyndon B. Johnson's national landslide victory.

Political Party	Number of registered voters (April 1, 2026)	Percent
Republican	14,543	63.01%
Independent	4,272	18.51%
Democratic	3,764	16.31%
Libertarian	327	1.42%
Legal Marijuana Now	174	0.75%
Total	23,080	100.00%

United States presidential election results for Lincoln County, Nebraska
Year	Republican		Democratic		Third party(ies)	
Year	No.	%	No.	%	No.	%
1900	1,386	53.06%	1,169	44.75%	57	2.18%
1904	1,449	63.89%	328	14.46%	491	21.65%
1908	1,541	48.43%	1,382	43.43%	259	8.14%
1912	690	21.63%	1,129	35.39%	1,371	42.98%
1916	1,309	34.61%	2,192	57.96%	281	7.43%
1920	3,342	57.40%	1,896	32.57%	584	10.03%
1924	2,857	40.94%	1,373	19.67%	2,749	39.39%
1928	5,946	70.58%	2,381	28.26%	98	1.16%
1932	3,082	32.68%	6,047	64.12%	302	3.20%
1936	3,857	35.73%	6,742	62.45%	197	1.82%
1940	5,908	54.36%	4,960	45.64%	0	0.00%
1944	5,969	57.88%	4,344	42.12%	0	0.00%
1948	4,419	51.68%	4,131	48.32%	0	0.00%
1952	8,292	69.00%	3,726	31.00%	0	0.00%
1956	7,523	62.70%	4,475	37.30%	0	0.00%
1960	7,685	61.49%	4,812	38.51%	0	0.00%
1964	4,811	42.74%	6,446	57.26%	0	0.00%
1968	5,996	58.39%	3,491	34.00%	782	7.62%
1972	7,502	69.97%	3,220	30.03%	0	0.00%
1976	7,076	55.55%	5,355	42.04%	308	2.42%
1980	9,643	66.60%	3,768	26.02%	1,068	7.38%
1984	10,717	70.01%	4,509	29.46%	81	0.53%
1988	8,425	57.57%	6,118	41.81%	91	0.62%
1992	7,054	45.04%	5,158	32.94%	3,449	22.02%
1996	7,482	50.54%	5,165	34.89%	2,157	14.57%
2000	9,220	61.00%	5,205	34.44%	689	4.56%
2004	11,056	68.25%	4,905	30.28%	238	1.47%
2008	10,817	66.46%	5,046	31.00%	414	2.54%
2012	10,728	68.53%	4,450	28.43%	477	3.05%
2016	12,164	75.41%	2,913	18.06%	1,054	6.53%
2020	13,071	76.16%	3,692	21.51%	400	2.33%
2024	12,674	76.67%	3,586	21.69%	270	1.63%

== Notable people ==
- Anne McGrew Bennett (1903–1986), writer and feminist

== Education ==
School districts include:

- Arnold Public Schools #89, Arnold
- Brady Public Schools #6, Brady
- Eustis-Farnam Public Schools #95, Eustis
- Gothenburg Public Schools #20, Gothenburg
- Hershey Public Schools #37, Hershey
- Maxwell Public Schools #7, Maxwell
- Maywood Public Schools #46, Maywood
- McPherson County Schools #90, Tryon
- Medicine Valley Public Schools #125, Curtis
- North Platte Public Schools #1, North Platte
- Paxton Consolidated Schools #6, Paxton
- Perkins County Schools #20, Grant
- Stapleton Public Schools #501, Stapleton
- Sutherland Public Schools #55, Sutherland
- Wallace Public School District #565, Wallace

== See also ==
- Lincoln County Sheriff's Office (Nebraska)
- National Register of Historic Places listings in Lincoln County, Nebraska
