= Lincoln County Sheriff's Office (Nebraska) =

- Abbreviation: LCSO

Jurisdictional structure
- Operations jurisdiction: Lincoln County, Nebraska, United States
- Legal jurisdiction: Lincoln County, Nebraska

Operational structure
- Headquarters: 302 N. Jeffers St., North Platte, NE 69101
- Agency executive: Jerome J. Kramer, Sheriff

The Lincoln County Sheriff's Office is a county-level police agency operating in Lincoln County, Nebraska.

== Office holders ==
=== 19th and early 20th century ===
The office of sheriff in Nebraska is an elected one. The first sheriff elected in Lincoln County was O. O. Austin, elected at Cottonwood Springs by 21 voters in October 1867. Much of the first sheriff's two-year term was spent with the newly incorporated Lincoln County's first court case, State of Nebraska vs. John Burley.

A few of the early sheriffs were professional lawmen. Sheriff David Baker, for example, was a 20-year law enforcement officer, variously a city marshal in North Platte for ten years, Lincoln County sheriff from 1888 to 1893, and Union Pacific Railroad ('UP') detective. So, too, was sheriff Tim Keliher, a two-term sheriff who had also been the county's deputy sheriff (elected in 1897 under sheriff Jake Miller), and who was a Union Pacific detective that helped organize UP's mobile ranger corps, and the chief special agent for the Illinois Central Railroad. Between the two of them, Baker and Keliher had more years in law enforcement than the more popular lawmen that history remembers, Wyatt Earp, Pat Garrett, and Wild Bill Hickok, combined. But, comparatively, far less is known and remembered of Baker and Keliher than of the likes of Earp, Garrett and Hickok.

Between 1867 and 1910, there were thirteen different sheriffs. None of them were gunfighters. The closest that the county came to such sheriffs were Asa Bradley, sheriff from 1876–1877, and Con Groner, sheriff from 1878–1883. These two were well known as excellent marksmen and were avid hunters, but neither had occasion to use those skills whilst in office. (No 19th century sheriff in Lincoln County killed anyone in the course of their duties.) Most of the county sheriffs were not even professional law enforcement officers but were ordinary citizens who were elected to office with little experience of law enforcement at all. The electorate seemed to choose men who were known and trusted by the community, with long histories and ties to it, rather than people who were handy with firearms. David Baker and Tim Keliher were professional law enforcers, as mentioned. So also, was sheriff William Woodhust, elected in 1872 (and who resigned the office in 1873 to become warden of Nebraska State Penitentiary), who had been deputy sheriff under the county's first two sheriffs, O. O. Austin and Nathan Russell. But the rest were mainly ordinary citizens.

Five of the first six sheriffs had worked for the railroad. O. O. Austin had run engines; Nathaniael Russell and Alex Struthers had worked in UP shops; Asa Bradley had been a railroad conductor; and Con Groner had been a teamster, hostler, and railroader. In part, this was simply because the railroad companies, and the people who worked for them, made up the majority of the business and population of Lincoln County at the time up until 1880. It was also because railroad employees tended to exercise a block vote. But it was further because in at least one election (Con Gronder versus Dan Heaphy, another UP engineer, in 1879), voters had no choice, since the only candidates were railroad people.

After 1880, however, there was an increase in the non-railroad population of the county, and non-railroad sheriffs were elected. John Bangs, elected in 1884 as the successor to Con Groner, owned a North Platte livery business; Luke Haley, sheriff from 1886 to 1887, was the operator of a saloon and restaurant; David Baker owned a boardinghouse, a hotel, a restaurant, and a bakery; and Ira Miltonberter, sheriff from 1906 to 1911, had a general merchandise store.

No doctors, lawyers, or prominent business people even stood for election to sheriff in the early years, possibly because the post was poorly remunerated — a possible reason too that many sheriffs (seven out of the first eight) didn't run for re-election. Originally, sheriffs were not salaried, but were paid fees for work done. A Nebraska county sheriff received no money if there were no criminals to arrest, no papers to serve, and no court or jail work to do. It wasn't until 1907 that the Nebraska state legislature made county sheriffs salaried offices. Further, the first five sheriffs had no municipal support in North Platte, which had no city marshals, and had the sole responsibility for patrolling the popular saloons, brothels, and billiard halls of Front Street, popular amongst off-duty soldiers and cowboys from the surrounding ranches. It wasn't until 1876 that North Platte gained its own police force.

Similarly, few sheriffs were farmers, the exceptions being Jake Miller and Lincoln Carpenter. There was little farmer population in Lincoln County until the 1890s in any event, but the post of sheriff was largely incompatible with being a farmer, both because the election campaign season coincided exactly with the busiest months for farm work, and because farmers, isolated as they were in rural districts, simply failed to muster the popular vote. William Hubbert, the farmer candidate in the 1875 election, only received 25 votes out of 361; and Fred Pierson, the farmer candidate in the 1901 and 1903 elections, also failed to win.

Although previous career was an influence on who was elected sheriff in Lincoln County, age was not, with the sheriffs ranging from Alex Struthers, elected at age 23, to Ira Miltonberger, elected at age 48 and one of several sheriffs (others being Baker, Carpenter, and Haley) elected when over 40 years old. The 1875 election, eventually won by 29-year-old Asa Bradley, was contested by several candidates in their twenties, something that the local newspaper, the North Platte Republican reported favorably. The sheriffs in their forties, with the exception of career law enforcement officer Baker, relied more heavily upon their much younger deputies for tasks other than administrative work, Hayley relying upon deputy John Merryman, Carpenter relying upon C. Ledgerwood, and Miltonberger relying upon deputy C. A. Lowell

From David Baker's three terms of office onwards, sheriffs tended more to seek re-election, and multiple-term incumbents became more of the norm. Miller, Keliher, and Carpenter each held the office for two terms. Miltonberger held it for three. Baker's stint in office marked a turning point, where the office of sheriff became more professionalized. More counties had been incorporated around Lincoln County, making the policing of outlying regions less daunting, there was greater assistance from experienced deputies, and from Union Pacific detectives, who were a more visible presence in the railroad towns of the county by the end of the 1880s.

Almost all sheriffs in the 19th century kept their noses clean both in and out of office, with the two major exceptions being Haley (who, after he had left office, had to pay a fine of USD25 for violating a municipal ordinance requiring him to have screens on all of his saloon windows) and Stuthers (who, years after he had been sheriff, in Grand Junction, Colorado shot and killed a highwayman that had attempted to rob him, but with the resultant charges against him dismissed on the grounds of self-defense).

== Duties ==
=== 19th century ===
In the 19th century, law enforcement in Nebraska, including Lincoln County was provided by federal, state, county, municipal, and private law enforcement officers. However, most of the work was performed by county sheriffs and their deputies, with state and federal agencies playing only minor rôles until the 20th century. Even United States marshals, who dealt with enforcement of federal laws regarding the mail, counterfeiting, land fraud, and sale of liquor to Native Americans, form little part of the historical record in Lincoln County from the 1870s onward.

The sheriffs and deputies were responsible for many tasks, including the investigation of serious crimes, the arrest of suspects, the guarding of people awaiting trial, the serving of court papers, the summoning of jurors to service, the opening of each session of the district court, the provision of courtroom security, and the transportation of convicted felons to the state penitentiary in Lincoln.

The county sheriffs were assisted in their work by precinct Constables, who served papers for the courts of justices of the peace, and by city marshals (for first and second class cities) and their associated policemen.

Little of the duties of Lincoln County sheriffs involved investigating murder. There were only 20 recorded murders in the county between 1868 and 1910, and most required little investigation. For example, when Michael Fillion shot Thomas Grimes in 1875, no investigation at all was required, because Fillion walked into sheriff Alex Struthers' office and surrendered himself. Only four of the 20 cases required a thorough investigation by the sheriff.

In contrast, a lot of the time of a sheriff dealt with crimes against the railroads and their property, crimes in rural districts such as cattle theft, and general public disorder in Front Street. Pickpockets and boxcar thieves targeted the passengers and rail traffic, and burglars targeted the UP rail yards at North Platte. UP itself came to employ a sizeable private security force to police its own property and passengers, that worked alongside the sheriff's office, and in the period from 1890 to 1910 52% of all criminal cases in Lincoln County Court were crimes against the railroad.
