= Moneta =

Epithet of Juno and Mnemosyne

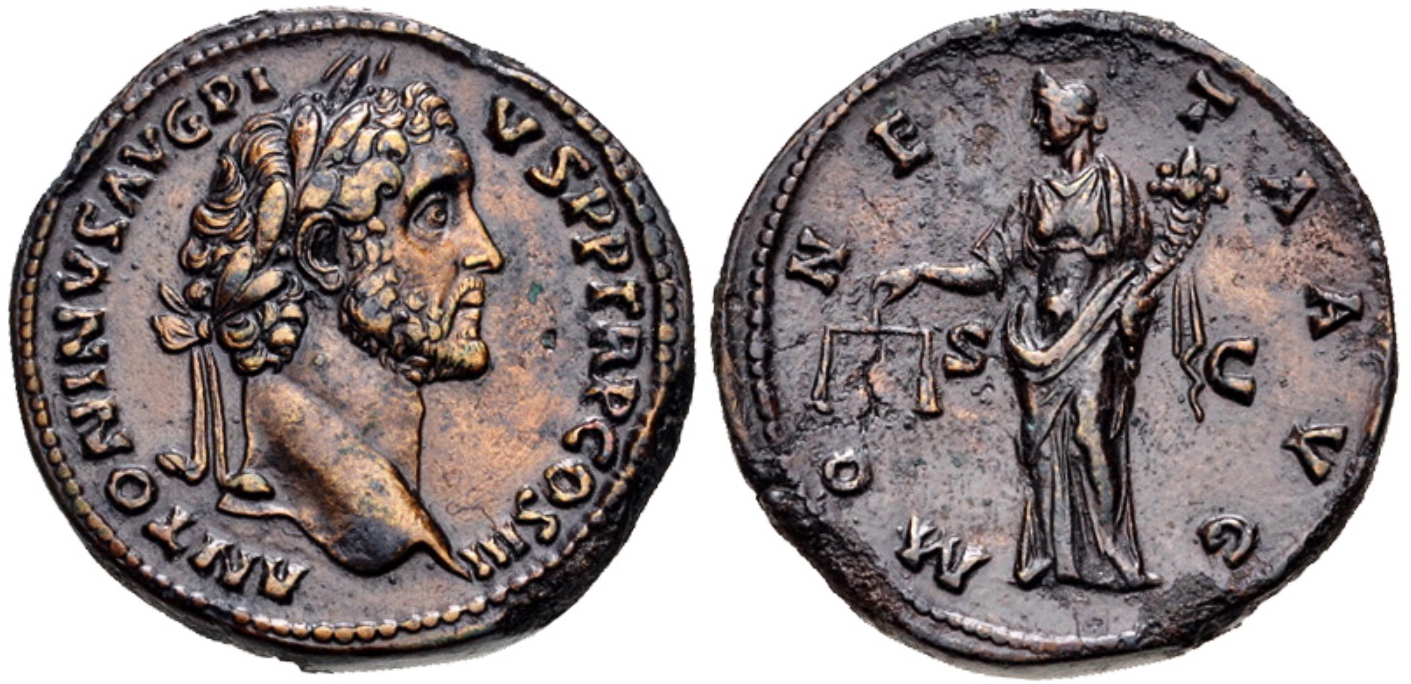
Sestertius of Antoninus Pius showing his portrait and Moneta holding scales and cornucopia

In Roman mythology, Moneta (Latin Monēta) was an epithet of Juno, called Juno Moneta (Latin Iūno Monēta). This name is the source of numerous words in English and the Romance languages, including money and mint.

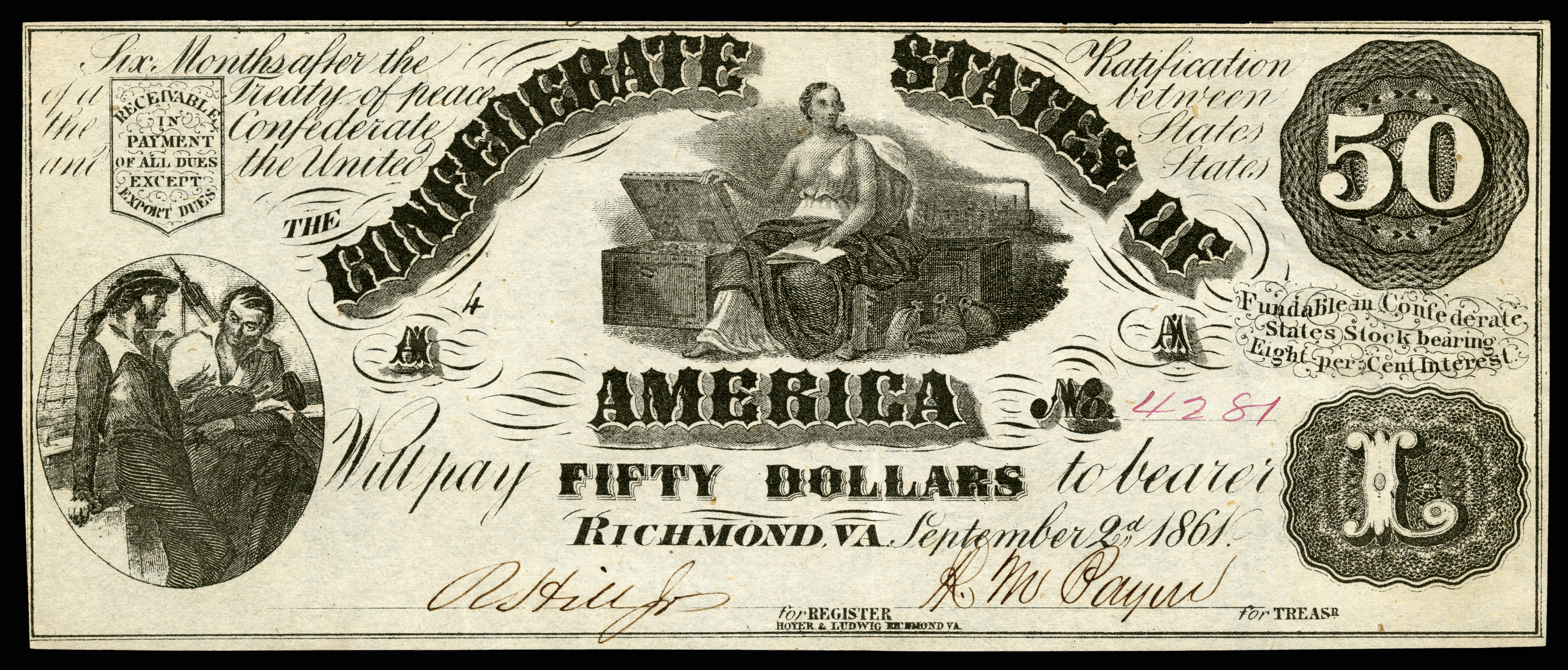
Moneta depicted with treasure chests on the front of an 1861 Confederate States of America $50 banknote.

In Greek religion, Mnemosyne (Μνημοσύνη) was the goddess of memory and the mother of the Muses. She could be equated with Juno Moneta. The goddess's name is derived from Latin moneō (infinitive monēre) 'to remind, warn, instruct'. She is mentioned in a fragment of Livius Andronicus' translation of the Odyssey to Latin: Nam diva Monetas filia docuit ("since the divine daughter of Moneta has taught", frg. 21 Büchner), which may be the equivalent of either Od. 8,480–1 or 488.

== Juno Moneta and Hyginus' Moneta ==
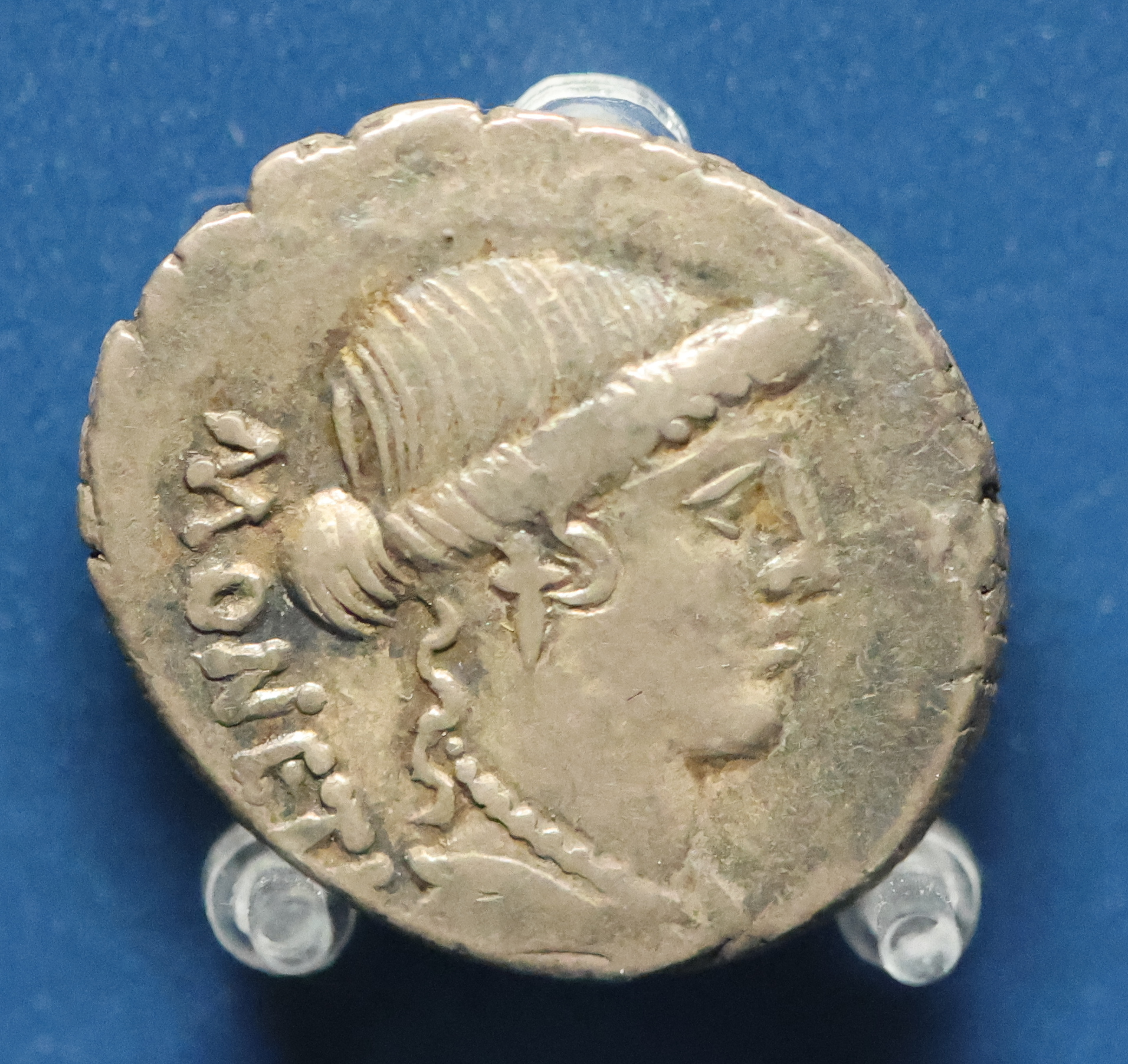
A bust of Juno Moneta on a denarius

Juno Moneta, an epithet of Juno, was the protectress of funds, and, accordingly, money in ancient Rome was coined in her temple. The word moneta (from which the words money and monetize are derived) was used by writers such as Ovid, Martial, Juvenal, and Cicero. In several modern languages, including Russian and Italian, moneta (Spanish moneda) is the word for "coin".

Juno Moneta's name (like the name of the goddess Moneta) is derived from Latin moneō (since, as the protectress of funds, she "warned" of economic instability).

According to the Suda, a Byzantine encyclopedia (which uses the Greek names of the goddess), she was called Moneta (Μονήτα) because when the Romans needed money during the wars against Pyrrhus and Taranto, they prayed to Hera, and she replied to them that, if they would hold out against the enemies with justice, they would not go short of money. After the wars, the Romans honoured Hera Moneta (that is, advisor, invoking the Latin verb moneō 'to warn, advise', and, accordingly, decided to stamp the coinage in her temple. Hyginus in his Fabulae, writes of Moneta as a Titaness daughter of Aether and Tellus, and as the mother by Jove of the nine Muses. Hyginus doesn't seem to identify Moneta with either Juno or Mnemosyne, as the latter is later called a daughter of Jove and Clymene.

== Coinage ==
"Moneta" retained the meanings of "money" and "die" well into the Middle Ages and appeared often on minted coins. For example, the phrase moneta nova is regular on coins of the Low Countries and the Rhineland in the fourteenth and fifteenth century, with the "nova", Latin for "new", not necessarily signifying a new type or variety of coin.

== In culture ==
Moneta is a central figure in John Keats' poem "The Fall of Hyperion: A Dream".
