= Battle of Richmond order of battle =

The order of battle for the Battle of Richmond, fought August 29–30, 1862, at Richmond, Kentucky, includes:

- Battle of Richmond order of battle: Confederate
- Battle of Richmond order of battle: Union
