= John J. Jacob (Kentucky businessman) =

American businessman, financier, real estate developer and philanthropist

John Jeremiah Jacob (October 20, 1778 – 1852) was an American businessman, financier, real estate developer, and philanthropist active in Kentucky. He was involved in banking, as well as in commerce, real estate, and infrastructure: railroads, canal, bridge, and utilities.

== Early life and career ==
John J. Jacob was born in Baltimore, Maryland. As a young man he met Thomas Prather in Philadelphia, and became inspired by his talk of the frontier. He left with him for Kentucky in 1800 at the age of 22. With his newfound partner, he established Prather & Jacob, a merchandising company in Louisville. He became the largest landowner and the richest resident of the city, its first millionaire.

Jacob organized and was the first president of the Louisville branch of the Bank of the United States and its successor, the Bank of Kentucky. He organized and was a member of the board of directors for the Galt House. He was president of the Lexington and Ohio Railroad and a member of the board of directors of the Louisville and Frankfort Railroad. He was also treasurer of the Louisville and Portland Canal and involved in the Ohio Bridge Commission in 1827. He was among the founders of the Louisville Gas and Water Company in 1838.

Jacob's residence was built on the block bounded by Third and Fourth streets, and Chestnut and Walnut Streets. (He shared the lot with George Keats, brother of the poet John.) His land holdings included much of the eventual central business district and Jacob's Woods, the area presently bounded by Fifth, Preston, Broadway, and Breckinridge streets. (He never owned the area of Jacobs or Jacob's Park, now "Iroquois Park"; these were named in honor of his son Charles Donald Jacob, who was mayor of Louisville for several terms and initiated the park's purchase and development.)

Together with George Keats, in 1841 Jacob was elected to Louisville's City Council for the Fourth Ward. He was a major contributor to Louisville's Blind Asylum and the City Hospital. In 1842, he erected Lyndon Hall, now part of the Hurstbourne Country Club's clubhouse, on his estate in what is now Hurstbourne.

His papers are held by the Filson Historical Society's Special Collections in Louisville.

== Marriage and family ==
In 1811 John J. Jacob married Anne Overton Fontaine, sister-in-law of his partner Thomas Prather in 1811. She bore three children before dying in 1819.

In 1822 Jacob married again, to Lucy Donald Robertson – granddaughter of Cdre. Richard Taylor and distant cousin of Capt. (later president) Zachary Taylor. She bore eight children before dying in 1842.

Jacob's children were:

- Matilda Prather Jacob (1815–1880), m. Col. Curran Pope (d. at Perryville)
- Mary Jacob (1817–1891), m. John W. Tyler
- John Jeremiah Jacob Jr. (1819–1873), lawyer and developer of Hurstbourne, m. Evelyn Johnson
- Susan Maria Jacob (1823–1905), m. Rep. James B. Clay, son of Henry Clay
- Lt. Gov. Richard Taylor Jacob (1825–1903), soldier under Fremont in the Mexican–American War, m. Eliza Benton (daughter of Sen. Thomas Hart Benton) & Laura Wilson
- Thomas Prather Jacob (1827–1889), m. Henrietta Wilson Pope
- Dr. William Rinaldo Jacob (1829–?), m. Maria Hale
- Isaac Robertson Jacob (1833–1873), m. Mary Mulholland
- Eliza Catharine Jacob (1835–1864), m. Samuel Howell Jones
- Mayor Charles Donald Jacob (1838–1898), m. Adelaide Martin & Edith Bullitt
- Lucy Anderson Jacob (1840–1870)
