= Battle of Richmond order of battle: Union =

The following Union Army units and commanders fought in the Battle of Richmond of the American Civil War. The Confederate order of battle is listed separately.

== Abbreviations used ==
=== Military rank ===
- MG = Major General
- BG = Brigadier General
- Col = Colonel
- Ltc = Lieutenant Colonel
- Maj = Major
- Cpt = Captain
- Lt = 1st Lieutenant

=== Other ===
- w = wounded
- mw = mortally wounded
- k = killed
- c = captured

== Army of Kentucky ==
MG William "Bull" Nelson (w)
BG Mahlon Dickerson Manson (in command until Nelson's arrival)

Brigade	Regiments and Others
1st Brigade BG Mahlon Dickerson Manson (c)	16th Indiana: Col Thomas J. Lucas; 55th Indiana: Ltc John R. Mahan; 69th Indiana: Ltc Harman J. Korff; 71st Indiana: Ltc Melville D. Topping (k); 7th Kentucky (detachment): Cpt Elisha Bowman Treadway; 3rd Tennessee (detachment): Ltc John C. Chiles; Improvised battery [Battery F, 1st Michigan Light Artillery; Battery G, 1st Michigan Light Artillery]: Lt Edwin O. Lanphere
2nd Brigade BG Charles Cruft	12th Indiana: Col William H. Link (mw); 66th Indiana: Maj Thomas G. Morrison, Cpt John F. Baird; 18th Kentucky: Col William A. Warner (k), Maj Frederick G. Bracht; 95th Ohio: Col William Linn McMillen (w)
Cavalry Brigade BG James S. Jackson	6th Kentucky Cavalry, Companies A, B, C, D, & E: Ltc Reuben J. Munday; 7th Kentucky Cavalry: Col Leonidas K. Metcalfe; 9th Kentucky Cavalry: Col Richard Taylor Jacob; 9th Pennsylvania Cavalry: Col Edward C. Williams

== See also ==
- Kentucky in the American Civil War
