= The Fall of Hyperion =

The Fall of Hyperion may refer to:

- The Fall of Hyperion: A Dream, an unfinished epic poem by John Keats
- The Fall of Hyperion (novel), a 1990 science fiction novel by Dan Simmons
