= Mansion of Many Apartments =

The Mansion of Many Apartments is a metaphor that the poet John Keats expressed in a letter to John Hamilton Reynolds dated Sunday, 3 May 1818.

I compare human life to a large Mansion of Many Apartments, two of which I can only describe, the doors of the rest being as yet shut upon me - The first we step into we call the infant or thoughtless Chamber, in which we remain as long as we do not think - We remain there a long while, and notwithstanding the doors of the second Chamber remain wide open, showing a bright appearance, we care not to hasten to it; but are at length imperceptibly impelled by awakening of the thinking principle - within us - we no sooner get into the second Chamber, which I shall call the Chamber of Maiden-Thought, than we become intoxicated with the light and the atmosphere, we see nothing but pleasant wonders, and think of delaying there for ever in delight: However among the effects this breathing is father of is that tremendous one of sharpening one's vision into the nature and heart of Man — of convincing one's nerves that the World is full of misery and Heartbreak, Pain, sickness and oppression — whereby This Chamber of Maiden Thought becomes gradually darken'd and at the same time on all sides of it many doors are set open - but all dark - all leading to dark passages — We see not the balance of good and evil. We are in a Mist - We are now in that state — We feel the burden of the Mystery.

Here Keats suggests that people were capable of different levels of thought. Those who did not consider the world around them remained in the thoughtless chamber. Even though the door to move on to the next "apartment" was open, they had no desire to think any deeper and to go into that next apartment.

When you did move on into the next chamber, you would for the first time have a choice of direction, as from this apartment there were several different dark passages. Keats believed that he was at this point when he wrote the letter, as was William Wordsworth when he wrote Tintern Abbey.

Keats expressed this idea in The Fall of Hyperion: A Dream (1819).

== See also ==
- Keats
- Negative Capability
