= 9th Kentucky Infantry Regiment =

9th Kentucky Infantry Regiment may refer to:

- 9th Kentucky Infantry Regiment (Confederate), a regiment in the Confederate States Army
- 9th Kentucky Infantry Regiment (Union), a regiment in the Union army

== See also ==
- 9th Kentucky Cavalry Regiment, a regiment in the Union army
