= P. Booker Reed =

American politician (1842–1913)

Paul Booker Reed
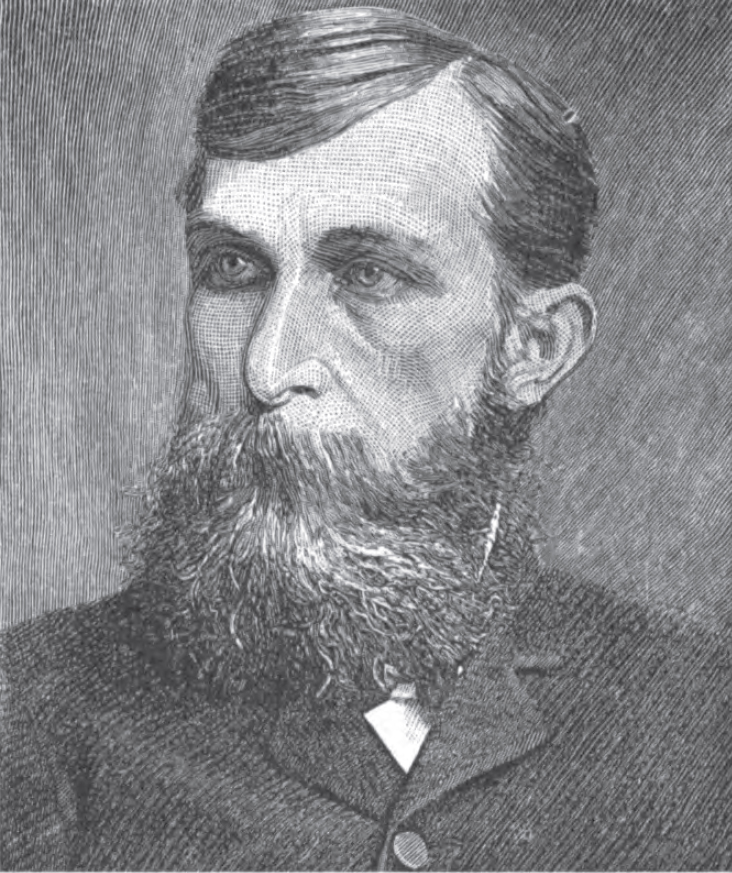

24th Mayor of Louisville
- In office 1885-1887
- Preceded by: Charles Donald Jacob
- Succeeded by: Charles Donald Jacob

Personal details
- Born: October 7, 1842 Frankfort, Kentucky, U.S.
- Died: November 9, 1913 (aged 71) Fort Macleod, Alberta, Canada
- Resting place: Cave Hill Cemetery; Louisville, Kentucky, U.S.
- Party: Democratic Party
- Parent: William Decatur Reed (father)
- Education: Centre College
- Military career
- Allegiance: Confederate States of America
- Branch: Confederate Army
- Rank: Private
- Units: Orphan Brigade; 9th Kentucky Infantry
- Conflicts: American Civil War

Paul Booker Reed was Mayor of Louisville, Kentucky from 1885 to 1887.

== Biography ==
His father, William Decatur Reed was a lawyer and Kentucky Secretary of State under Governor William Owsley. P. Booker Reed studies at Centre College were interrupted by the Civil War, during which he served the Confederate Army for four years as a private in the Orphan Brigade and the Kentucky Ninth Infantry. After the war he attended medical school in Europe. He started a successful manufacturing business in Louisville in the 1870s.

In 1880 he was appointed to Louisville's Chancery Court, and in 1884, with the support of emerging political boss John Whallen, he was elected mayor over John W. McGee. During his three-year term he balanced the city's budget, cutting unnecessary city positions and lowering salaries, including his own.

After his term of mayor he served as president of the Board of Aldermen as a Republican from 1899 to 1900. He dropped out of the 1901 race for mayor.

He then moved west to Seattle then to Canada. He was buried in Cave Hill Cemetery in Louisville.

== See also ==
- Southern Exposition
