= Susan Clay Sawitzky =

American poet and art historian

Susan Clay Sawitzky (July 21, 1897 – July 11, 1981) was an American poet and art historian.

She was born Susan Jacob Clay in Frankfort, Kentucky, to Charles Donald Clay and his wife, the former Mariah Hensley Pepper. Susan was raised on her father's thoroughbred farm outside of Lexington, Kentucky and in the strict Victorian homes of her grandmothers. She was a great-granddaughter of Henry Clay and a granddaughter of James Brown Clay. Much of her life she felt a deep ambivalence toward her heritage. On the one hand, she found that legacy a source of pride, satisfaction, and strength. At the same time, she felt constricted and obligated to live up to a name that carried high expectations in her native Bluegrass region of Kentucky. She also chafed under the restrictions placed on women of her class, time, and place.

In the early 1920s Clay worked as a reporter and feature writer for the Louisville Herald newspaper. But on the advice of the writer Edna Ferber, Susan quit that job. Ferber had said that working as a reporter would not help Susan develop as a poet.

On May 5, 1927, at age 29, Susan Clay shocked her family and local society by eloping with a divorced, much older Russian émigré named Vassili (William) Sawitzky (1879 – February 2, 1947). He was an art historian and dealer. The couple lived in New York City and Connecticut. They had one child, who was stillborn.

At nearly age 84, Susan Sawitzky died in New Haven, Connecticut. She lived alone in a dark, one-room apartment in a dangerous section of the city. Her ashes were scattered near a pond in Stamford, Connecticut.

== Art history ==
William Sawitzky, an art dealer and art historian, was an authority on eighteenth-century American painting. Susan Sawitzky soon took to this subject with relish. Until he died from emphysema, she helped William with his research. Following William's death, Susan devoted much energy to carrying on his work. She wrote articles on Ralph Earl, Abraham Delanoy, and Reuben Moulthrop that were published by the New York Historical Society.

== Poetry ==
Sawitzky wrote poetry for more than sixty years. Her earliest published poems and stories appeared in Town & Country, the New York Times, and in local Kentucky publications during the early 1920s. A book, Poems by Susan Clay, was published in 1923. She stopped publishing after her marriage, except for a poem that ran in a 1941 edition of Poetry magazine.

In 1984 the Kentucky Poetry Review posthumously published a volume of her work entitled The Encircling Thread. Her poems are moving testaments to the lifelong tension she felt for the traditions which she both honored and rebelled against.

== Sources ==
- Lindsey Apple, Cautious Rebel: A Biography of Susan Clay Sawizky, The Kent State University Press, Kent, Ohio, 1997.
