= William Decatur Reed =

American lawyer and politician

- Born: February 15, 1815 near Danville, Kentucky, Boyle County, Kentucky, U.S.
- Died: May 30, 1858 (aged 43); Louisville, Kentucky, U.S.
- Education: Centre College
- Occupations: Lawyer, politician, public official
- Known for: Secretary of State of Kentucky (1847–1848); member of Kentucky General Assembly
- Political party: Whig
- Spouse: Jane Maxwell Sharp
- Children: 7, including P. Booker Reed

William Decatur Reed (February 15, 1815 – May 30, 1858) was an American lawyer, politician, and public official who served as Secretary of State of Kentucky and as a member of the Kentucky state legislature.

Reed was born near Danville, Kentucky, in Boyle County, to Jonathan Reed and Annie (Gaines) Reed. The Reed family migrated from Virginia to Kentucky between 1775 and 1780, and land marked "Reeds" appears on John Filson's 1784 map of Kentucky. Orphaned at a young age, he was raised by his sister Letitia and her husband, a local judge. He later attended Centre College.

Likely affiliated with the Whig Party, he was appointed Secretary of State of Kentucky by Governor William Owsley and served from 1847 to 1848. He represented Franklin County, Kentucky, in the Kentucky General Assembly.

He lived in Springfield, Kentucky, and Frankfort, Kentucky, before settling in Louisville, Kentucky.

In 1839, he married Jane Maxwell Sharp, the daughter of Solomon P. Sharp, who had served as Attorney General of Kentucky. They had five sons and two daughters. P. Booker Reed was one of his sons.
