= Richard Taylor Jacob =

American politician (1825–1903)

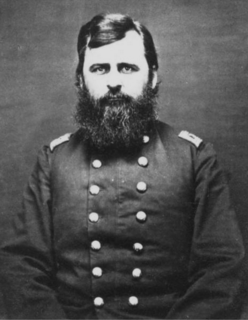

18th Lieutenant Governor of Kentucky
- In office September 1, 1863 – September 3, 1867
- Governor: Thomas E. Bramlette
- Preceded by: Linn Boyd
- Succeeded by: John W. Stevenson

Member of the Kentucky House of Representatives from Oldham County
- In office August 1, 1859 – August 3, 1863
- Preceded by: Samuel E. DeHaven
- Succeeded by: Samuel E. DeHaven

Personal details
- Born: March 13, 1825 Oldham County, Kentucky, U.S.
- Died: September 13, 1903 (aged 78)
- Party: Democratic; Republican
- Spouses: Sarah Benton (m. 1848; died 1863) Laura Wilson (m. 1865)
- Relations: Charles Donald Jacob (brother)
- Parent: John J. Jacob (father)
- Military career
- Allegiance: California Republic; United States; Union
- Branch: Union Army
- Units: California Battalion; 9th Kentucky Cavalry
- Conflicts: Bear Flag Revolt; American Civil War; Morgan's Raid

Richard Taylor Jacob (March 13, 1825 – September 13, 1903) was an American attorney and politician, elected as the 18th lieutenant governor of Kentucky (1863–67). Although a slaveholder, he was loyal to the Union during the American Civil War, raising the 9th Kentucky Cavalry for its defense.

Due to his support of Democratic Party candidate George B. McClellan for the presidency in 1864, Jacob was arrested and expelled from the state during the war. Governor Thomas E. Bramlette appealed to President Abraham Lincoln for Jacob's release, and he was subsequently allowed to return to Kentucky.

== Background and early life ==
Richard Taylor Jacob was born in Oldham County, Kentucky, to an influential family. His father, John J. Jacob (1770–1852), was a well-known businessman and real estate speculator; his brother, Charles Donald Jacob, eventually served three terms as mayor of Louisville; and his sister, Susan, married James Brown Clay, son of statesman Henry Clay. James Clay later was elected as a U.S. Representative from Kentucky.

Richard Jacob studied law in 1825 and visited South America. He happened to be in California when the Bear Flag Revolt broke out. He joined the cavalry forces of General John C. Fremont and served as a captain. When Fremont was on trial in Washington, D.C. for his actions in California, Jacob appeared as a witness on the general's behalf.

At that time, Jacob met Fremont's sister-in-law, Sarah Benton, a daughter of Senator Thomas Hart Benton; the couple married in January 1848. For a few years Jacob farmed in Missouri, his wife's home state. In 1855 Jacob bought a farm called "Woodland" on the Ohio River in Oldham County, Kentucky, and moved there with his family. He called the farm 'Clifton' while living there.

== Civil War ==
In 1859, Jacob was elected as a Democrat to Kentucky's state legislature. In 1860, Jacob supported John C. Breckinridge for president. But when the American Civil War broke out, he remained loyal to the Union and worked to prevent Kentucky from seceding and joining the Confederacy.

In 1862, he raised the 9th Kentucky Cavalry, a regiment of 1,244 men. Over the next year, he took part in several skirmishes and battles, including resisting Morgan's Raid in 1863.

That year, Jacob was elected Lieutenant Governor of Kentucky, as the running mate of Thomas E. Bramlette. The partnership between the two men did not last long. Jacob attacked the Emancipation Proclamation, issued in 1863, considering it unfair to those Kentucky slave-holders who remained loyal to the Union as it did not provide compensation for freeing slaves. Adding to Jacob's troubles, his wife Sarah died that year.

In 1864, Jacob supported General George B. McClellan's candidacy for the presidency. General Stephen G. Burbridge, the Union commander of the district of Kentucky, had caused much controversy and opposition in the state for his heavy-handed tactics, including execution of suspected spies on flimsy evidence. Trying to ensure a Lincoln win in the state, Burbridge arrested Jacob for his attacks on the Lincoln administration and sent him through the Confederate lines to Richmond, Virginia.

Jacob denied that he ever spoke against the Union and appealed to President Lincoln. Apparently, Lincoln believed Jacob, or at least sought to placate Jacob's supporters in Kentucky. The president allowed Jacob to visit Washington, D.C. and gave him a letter securing his release. Jacob returned to his home state. In 1865 he married again, to Laura Wilson.

== Later years ==
Later, Jacob ran for Congress (1867) and for an appellate clerkship, but he lost both elections. In 1876 he was elected judge of the Oldham County court, but declined to run for a second term.

At about this time, Jacob joined the Republican Party. From 1895 to 1899, he served as park commissioner of Louisville.

== Trivia ==
- Richard Taylor Jacob's father, John Jeremiah Jacob (1770–1852), should not be confused with Richard's distant cousin, also named John J. Jacob (1829–1893), who served as Governor of West Virginia.
- In 1996 Jacob's former farm, "Clifton," became the site of a commercial bison farm.

== See also ==
- Kentucky in the Civil War

Political offices
Preceded by Linn Boyd	Lieutenant Governor of Kentucky; 1863–1867	Succeeded by John W. Stevenson
