= Charles Donald Jacob =

American politician (1838–1898)

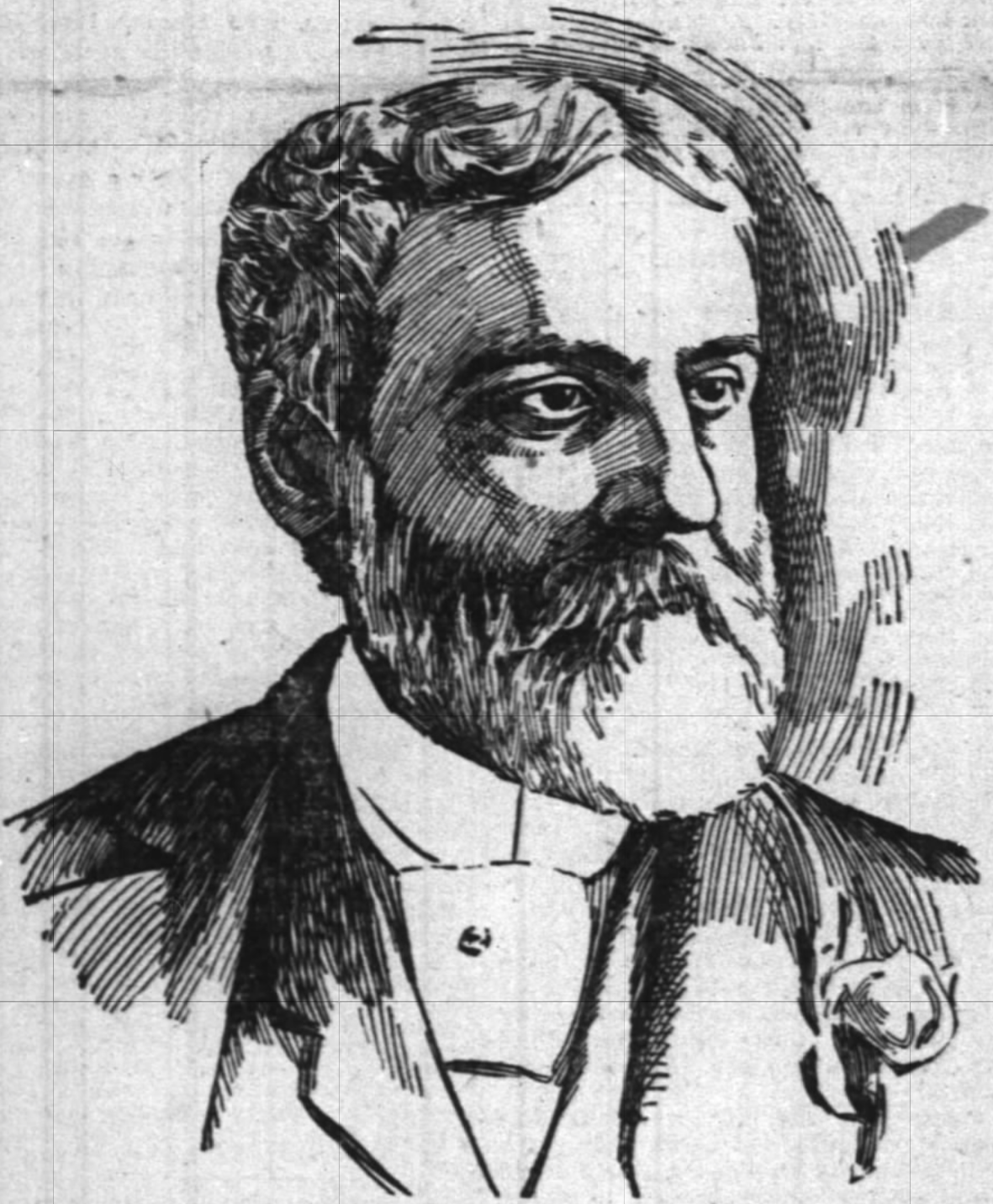

21st, 23rd & 25th Mayor of Louisville
- In office 1888–1890
- Preceded by: P. Booker Reed
- Succeeded by: William L. Lyons
- In office 1882–1884
- Preceded by: John George Baxter
- Succeeded by: P. Booker Reed
- In office 1873–1878
- Preceded by: John George Baxter
- Succeeded by: John George Baxter

Personal details
- Born: June 1, 1838
- Died: December 25, 1898 (aged 60); Louisville, Kentucky, U.S.
- Resting place: Cave Hill Cemetery; Louisville, Kentucky, U.S.
- Political party: Democratic
- Spouses: Addie Martin (m. 1869; died 1878) Edith Bullitt (m. 1897)
- Relations: Richard Taylor Jacob (brother); Richard Taylor (great-grandfather)
- Children: 3
- Parent: John J. Jacob (father)

Charles Donald Jacob (June 1, 1838 – December 25, 1898) was an American politician who served four terms as mayor of Louisville, Kentucky, two consecutively in 1873–78, then later in 1882–84 and 1888–90. He also served as the U.S. minister to Colombia in 1885–1886. He was a member of the Democratic Party.

In Mayor Jacob's third term, he oversaw the opening of the Southern Exposition. Perhaps Jacob's most lasting contribution was his fourth-term establishment in 1889 of a large park in Louisville, today called Iroquois Park, which was landscaped by Frederick Law Olmsted.

== Early life ==
Charles Donald Jacob was born on June 1, 1838, in Louisville, Kentucky to John J. and Lucy Donald (née Robertson) Jacob. His mother was the granddaughter of Commodore Richard Taylor of American Revolutionary War fame. His father was John J. Jacob, the financier and philanthropist who was Louisville's first millionaire. His older brother was Richard Taylor Jacob, who became Kentucky Lieutenant Governor, and his brother-in-law was James Brown Clay, who was elected as a U.S. Representative.

== Career ==
In 1870, Jacob was urged to run for City Council and he was elected. In 1872, Jacob ran for mayor against John G. Baxter. He was elected and served two terms, from 1873 to 1878. Baxter again became mayor, and Jacob ran again in 1881 and won. He served as mayor for one more term from 1882 to 1884. He was urged again to run for mayor in 1888. He ran as an independent challenger against Democratic nominee Judge W. B. Hoke and Republican nominee Samuel Avery and won by a large majority (almost 4,000 votes). In this term, he established the Park Commission and managed the purchase of a plot of land called "Burnt Knob". From that land, he built what was called Jacob Park (later Iroquois Park) and a bridge that was nicknamed "Jacob's Folly" in Louisville. In 1893, Jacob ran against Henry S. Tyler for mayor after Tyler's first term, but he was defeated. In 1896, Jacob was offered the Democratic ticket if he ran in support of the free silver cause. He declined, and ran again as an independent, but lost to Republican candidate George Davidson Todd.

Jacob was appointed U.S. minister to Colombia by President Grover Cleveland and served in that role for two years, until he resigned. In 1886, Jacob was elected president of the Mutual Life Insurance Company of Kentucky, a position he held until his death. He was also president of the Central Savings Bank for a time.

== Personal life ==
Jacob married Addie Martin, the daughter of local Louisville commission merchant Thomas J. Martin, on January 12, 1869. They had three children: Jennie, Lucy and Charles D. Jacob Jr. Charles D. Jacob Jr. was killed in the Battle of San Juan Hill on July 1, 1898. His wife died on March 4, 1878. Jacob married Edith Bullitt on June 2, 1897.

Jacob died on December 25, 1898, in Louisville. He was interred in Cave Hill Cemetery in Louisville.

== Legacy and honors ==
The Jacobs neighborhood in Louisville is named for him.

Political offices
Preceded by John G. Baxter	Mayor of Louisville, Kentucky; 1873–1878	Succeeded by John G. Baxter
Preceded by John G. Baxter	Mayor of Louisville, Kentucky; 1882–1884	Succeeded by P. Booker Reed
Preceded by P. Booker Reed	Mayor of Louisville, Kentucky; 1888–1890	Succeeded by William L. Lyons
Diplomatic posts
Preceded by William L. Scruggs	United States Minister to Colombia; 26 January 1886 – 29 May 1886	Succeeded by Dabney H. Maury
