= Jacobs, Louisville =

Neighborhood in Louisville, Kentucky

Coordinates: 38°11′31″N 85°47′28″W

Jacobs is a neighborhood on the south side of Louisville, Kentucky, in the United States. Its boundaries are Berry Boulevard to the north, Taylor Boulevard to the east, the I-264 to the south, and Seventh Street to the west. It was developed as Jacob's Addition in 1892 after the opening of nearby Jacob's Park (now "Iroquois Park") and named for four-time Louisville mayor Charles Donald Jacob. The area housed a veteran's hospital, Nichols General Hospital, until 1952. The area includes Manslick Cemetery, a burial ground for indigents started in the 1870s, and Watterson Lake Park.
