= James Brown Clay =

American politician

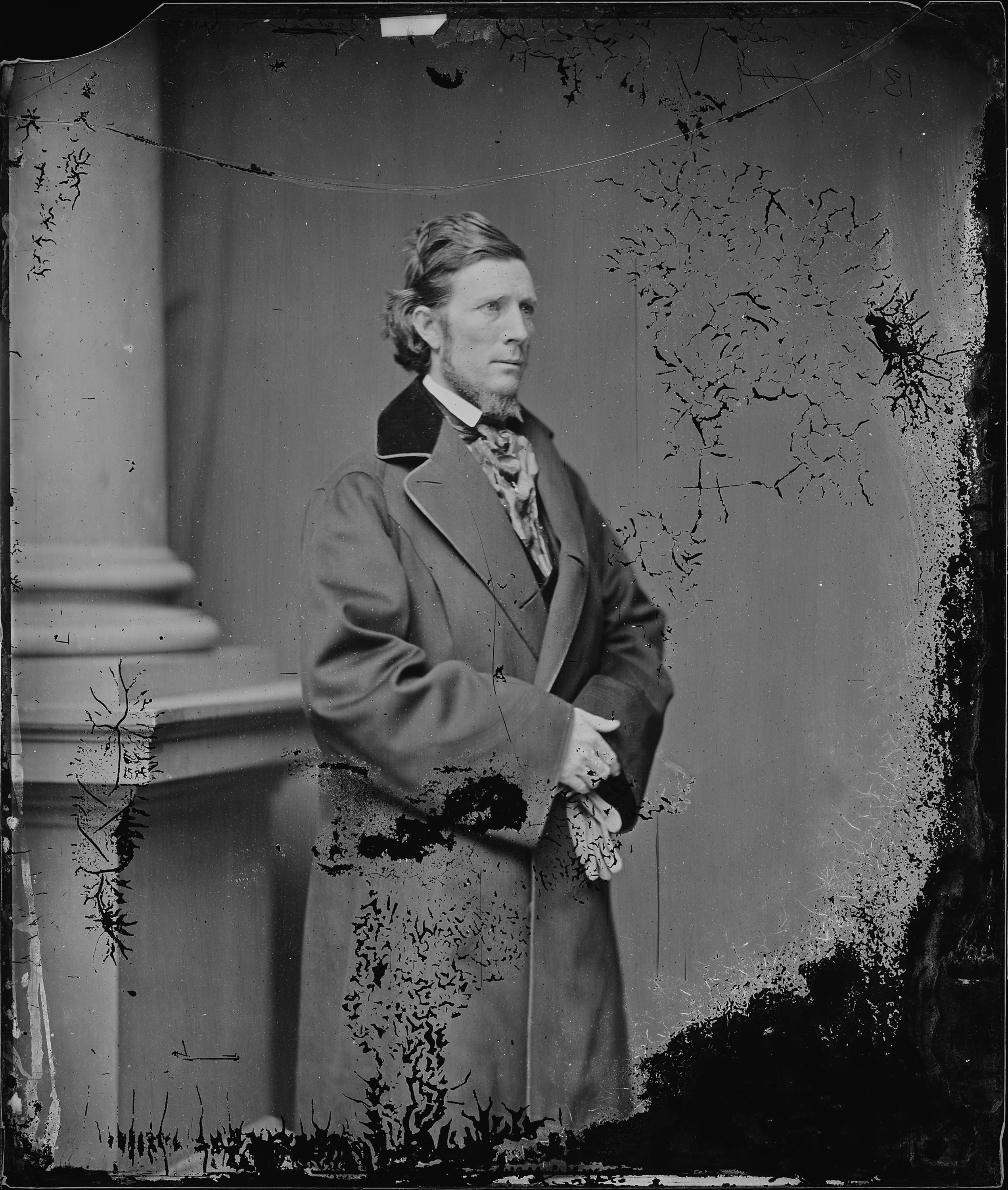

Member of the U.S. House of Representatives from Kentucky's 8th district
- In office March 4, 1857 – March 3, 1859
- Preceded by: Alexander Keith Marshall
- Succeeded by: William E. Simms

13th United States Ambassador to Portugal
- In office August 1, 1849 – July 19, 1850
- President: Zachary Taylor
- Preceded by: George Washington Hopkins
- Succeeded by: Charles B. Haddock

Personal details
- Born: November 9, 1817 Washington, D.C., U.S.
- Died: January 26, 1864 (aged 46) Montreal, Quebec, Canada
- Resting place: Lexington Cemetery
- Party: Whig; Democratic
- Spouse: Susan Maria Jacob
- Relatives: Henry Clay (father); Henry Clay, Jr. (brother); John Morrison Clay (brother); James Brown (uncle); Susan Clay Sawitzky (granddaughter)
- Education: Transylvania University
- Profession: Lawyer

James Brown Clay (November 9, 1817 – January 26, 1864) was an American politician and diplomat who served as a member of the United States House of Representatives for Kentucky's 8th congressional district from 1857 to 1859.

== Early life and education ==
Born in Washington, D.C., while his father, Henry Clay, was serving in the United States Congress, James Brown Clay was named for the husband of his maternal aunt, James Brown. His brothers were Henry Clay, Jr. and John Morrison Clay. Clay attended a boys' school associated with Kenyon College, Gambier, Ohio (founded by family friend Bishop Philander Chase). Later, Clay attended Transylvania University in Lexington, Kentucky.

== Career ==
He worked at a countinghouse in Boston from 1832 to 1834 before studying law and being admitted to the bar. He practiced law with his father in Lexington, Kentucky.

Clay served as chargé d'affaires to Portugal from August 1, 1849, to July 19, 1850. He farmed in Missouri in 1851 and 1852 before returning to Lexington. Clay had been a lifelong member of the Whig Party. But when the Whig Party disintegrated following Henry Clay's death, and due to the controversy surrounding the Kansas–Nebraska Act, Clay joined the Democratic Party. He was elected to the Thirty-fifth Congress (March 4, 1857 – March 3, 1859). Clay did not run for renomination in 1858 and declined an appointment by President James Buchanan to a mission to Germany. His father having died, Clay returned to Lexington and farmed using enslaved labor; his household also included three male boarders. In the 1860 census he owned a dozen slaves in Fayette County (surrounding Lexington).

Clay was a member of the Peace Conference of 1861 held in Washington, D.C., an attempt to prevent the impending American Civil War. During the Civil War Clay supported the Confederacy and was commissioned to raise a regiment. Ill-health from tuberculosis prevented Clay from doing so.

== Personal life ==
In 1843, Clay married Susan Maria Jacob, the daughter of Louisville's first millionaire, John J. Jacob, and sister of its later mayor, Charles Donald Jacob. The couple eventually had ten children.

== Death and legacy ==
Clay died in Montreal, Quebec, Canada, where he had gone for his health. He is interred at his family plot in Lexington Cemetery.

== See also ==
- Henry Clay
- Ashland (Henry Clay home)
- Clay family
- Henry Clay, Jr.
- Susan Clay Sawitzky
- Thomas Clay McDowell

U.S. House of Representatives
Preceded by Alexander K. Marshall	Member of the U.S. House of Representatives from Kentucky's 8th congressional district 1857 – 1859	Succeeded by William E. Simms
