= 9th Pennsylvania Cavalry Regiment =

Union Army cavalry regiment

9th Pennsylvania Volunteer Cavalry
- Pennsylvania flag
- Active: August 29, 1861, to July 1865
- Country: United States
- Allegiance: Union
- Branch: Cavalry
- Engagements: Battle of Richmond; Battle of Perryville; Chickamauga Campaign; Sherman's March to the Sea; Carolinas campaign

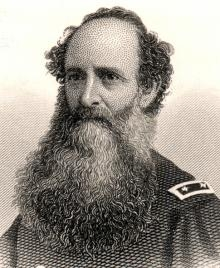
Brevet Brigadier-General of Volunteers Thomas Jefferson Jordan

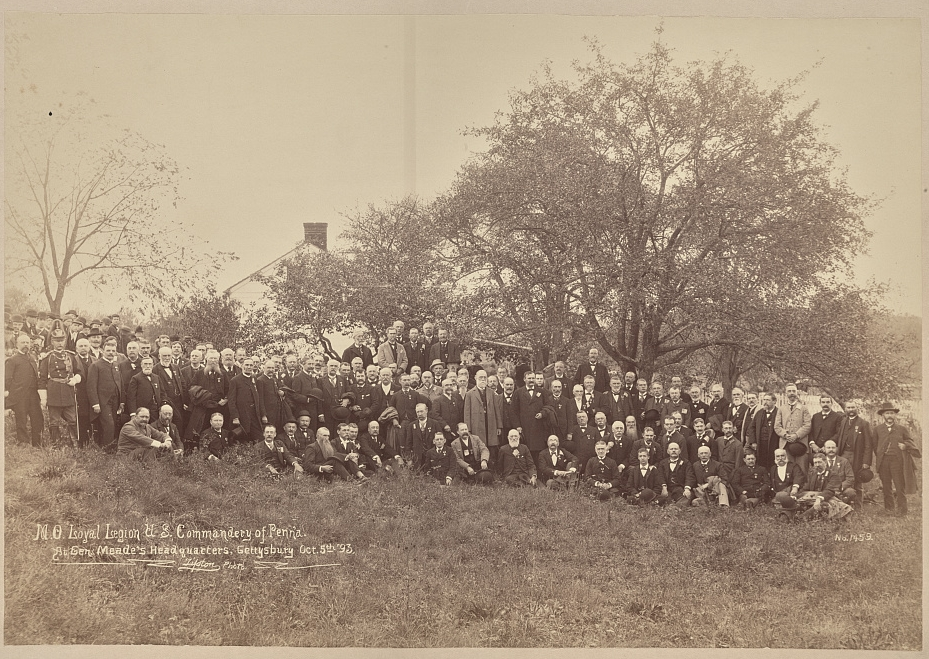
The 9th Pennsylvania veterans pictured at Gettysburg, October 5, 1893

The 9th Pennsylvania Cavalry Regiment was a Union Army cavalry regiment that participated in the American Civil War. It was one of the most respected Union volunteer cavalry units in the war.

== History ==
The regiment was organized August 29, 1861, at Camp Cameron near Harrisburg. It was composed of 12 companies, mostly recruited from the counties of south-central and southeast Pennsylvania.

Its officers were Col. Edward C. Williams, Lt. Col. Thomas C. James, Major Charles A. Appel and Maj. Thomas Jefferson Jordan. Williams was a famous soldier in central Pennsylvania, a bookbinder from Harrisburg who had been a hero in the Mexican–American War. James had served as Captain of the First Troop Philadelphia City Cavalry, a militia unit active since before the Revolutionary War. He brought a great knowledge of cavalry organization and tactics. Jordan served until the end of the war, attaining the rank of Brevet Brigadier General. The original officers of the 9th Pennsylvania Cavalry were politically appointed, but many had previous military experience.

After recruitment and initial training, the regiment was sent to Kentucky, where it was assigned to the Department of the Cumberland and given additional training. In March, it was ordered into Tennessee, where it fought several battles over the next few months with John Hunt Morgan's Confederate cavalry, capturing hundreds of his men, including his second-in-command and his quartermaster.

After the Battle of Richmond on August 30, 1862, it covered the retreat of the Union Army of Kentucky along with the 9th Kentucky Cavalry. Being assigned to the Army of the Ohio, it saw only some skirmishing at the Battle of Perryville on October 8, 1862.

Near the end of January 1863, Colonel Williams resigned his commission and Lieutenant Colonel James died, leaving Major Jordan in command of the 9th. During the Chickamauga campaign during the late summer of 1863, the regiment fought in several skirmishes and captured part of the advance guard of Lt. Gen. James Longstreet's corps. During the Battle of Chickamauga, it guarded the right flank of the Union army, and, after the rout of the Union left wing, continued fighting with Thomas.

In April 1864, the regiment re-enlisted and was given a furlough so it could return to Pennsylvania to recruit more men. The 9th helped defeat Morgan during another of his raids into Kentucky and in September fought Joseph Wheeler's raid into Tennessee.

After this, it joined Sherman in his march to the sea and later in his march through the Carolinas, fighting several times with Wheeler, including at the Battle of Griswoldville. During this time, Colonel Jordan was promoted to brigadier general and Lieutenant Colonel Kimmel was promoted to command of the regiment. On April 17, 1865, the 9th served as part of the escort who traveled with General Sherman to meet General Johnston at the Bennett Farm near Durham Station. After the surrender of General Joseph E. Johnston's army at the Bennett Place in North Carolina, the 9th was mustered out at Lexington, Kentucky, and finally disbanded at Harrisburg, Pennsylvania.

The 9th fought against the famous Confederate leaders Forrest, Wheeler and Morgan, among others. Even early in the war when Confederate cavalry was normally superior to most Union forces, the regiment won most of its encounters with the enemy. An 1866 account reports the regimental casualties during the 1864 March to The Sea:

- November 21 near Macon Georgia – 1 missing
- November 22 at Griswold Georgia – 5 killed/21 wounded/42 captured
- December 2 forgers – 4 missing
- December 3 forgers near Thomas Station – 8 missing
- December 4 in action at Waynesboro – 1 killed/12 wounded {Note:earlier note reports casualties as 1 killed/2 mortally wounded/11 wounded}
- Foragers missing during campaign – 12 missing
- Captured: 288 horses; 152 mules; 2 carbines
- Abandoned: 441 horses; 13 mules; 57 sets of horse equipment; 13 carbines; 17 sabres
- Lost in action: 91 horses; 97 sets of horse-equipments; 95 carbines; 77 sabres; 11 colt revolvers

== Casualties ==
- Killed and mortally wounded: 6 officers, 66 enlisted men
- Died of disease: 2 officers, 155 enlisted men
- Wounded: ? officers, ? enlisted men
- Captured: ? officers, ? enlisted men
- Total: ? officers, ? enlisted men
