= Battle of Richmond order of battle: Confederate =

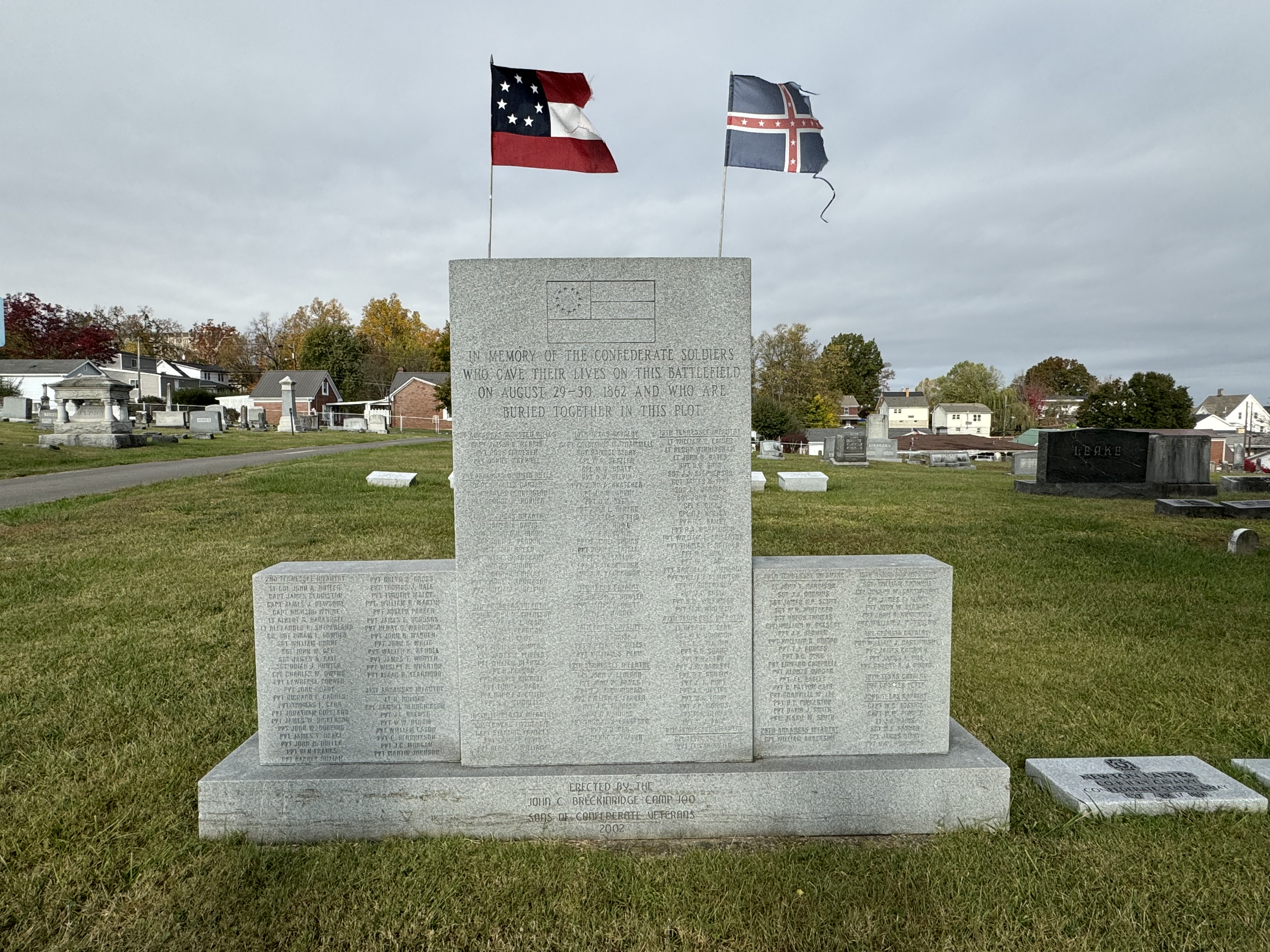
Monument for the Confederate soldiers buried in a mass grave at Richmond Cemetery in Richmond, Kentucky.

The following Confederate Army units and commanders fought in the Battle of Richmond of the American Civil War. The Union order of battle is listed separately.

== Abbreviations used ==
=== Military rank ===
- MG = Major General
- BG = Brigadier General
- Col = Colonel
- Ltc = Lieutenant Colonel
- Maj = Major
- Cpt = Captain

=== Other ===
- k = killed
- w = wounded

== Army of Kentucky ==
MG E. Kirby Smith
Escort:

- Company A, E, and F; 1st Florida Cavalry: Cpt William M. Footman
- Georgia Cavalry: Cpt Thomas M. Nelson

Division	Brigade	Regiments and Others
Churchill's Division; BG Thomas J. Churchill	McCray's Brigade Col Thomas H. McCray	31st Arkansas Sharpshooters: Maj James W. Clark; 10th Texas Cavalry (dismounted): Col Cullen R. Earp; 11th Texas Cavalry (dismounted): Col John C. Burks; 14th Texas Cavalry (dismounted): Col Matthew D. Ector; 32nd (15th) Texas Cavalry (dismounted): Ltc James A. Weaver
Churchill's Division; BG Thomas J. Churchill	McNair's Brigade Col Evander McNair	1st Arkansas Mounted Rifles (dismounted): Col Daniel H. Reynolds; 2nd Arkansas Mounted Rifles (dismounted): Col Harris Flanagin; 4th Arkansas Infantry: Ltc Henry C. Bunn; 25th Arkansas Infantry: Col Charles J. Turnbull; 4th Arkansas Infantry Battalion: Maj Jesse A. Ross; Humphreys' Artillery: Cpt John T. Humphreys
Cleburne's Division; BG Patrick R. Cleburne (w); Col Preston Smith	Smith's Brigade Col Preston Smith; Col Alfred Jefferson Vaughan	12th and 47th Tennessee Infantry: Col Lipscomb P. McMurray; 13th Tennessee Infantry: Col Alfred J. Vaughan, Jr., Ltc William E. Morgan; 154th Senior Tennessee Infantry: Col Edward Fitzgerald (k), Ltc Michael Mageveney, Jr; Marion (Florida) Light Artillery: Cpt John M. Martin
Cleburne's Division; BG Patrick R. Cleburne (w); Col Preston Smith	Hill's Brigade Col Benjamin J. Hill	13th and 15th Arkansas Infantry: Col Lucius E. Polk (w); 2nd Tennessee Infantry: Ltc John A. Butler (k), Cpt Charles W. Moore; 35th Tennessee Infantry: Ltc Joseph A. Smith; 48th Tennessee Infantry: Col George H. Nixon, Ltc Thomas R. Hughes; Sharpshooter Company; Douglas's Texas Battery: Cpt James P. Douglas

Brigade	Regiments and Others
Cavalry Brigade Col John S. Scott	1st Georgia Cavalry: Col James J. Morrison; 3nd Tennessee Cavalry (detachment): Col James W. Starnes; 1st Louisiana Cavalry: Ltc James O. Nixon; Buckner Guards: Cpt William L. Garnett

=== Troops Attached to Smith's Command [Not Present] ===
- 2nd Kentucky Cavalry: Col John Hunt Morgan
- Stevenson's Division: BG Carter L. Stevenson
  - Left in Powell Valley, Virginia against Federal forces at Cumberland Gap
- Heth's Division: BG Henry Heth
  - En route from Barbourville, Kentucky

== See also ==
- Kentucky in the American Civil War
