= 9th Kentucky Cavalry Regiment =

- Active: August 22, 1862 - September 11, 1863
- Country: United States
- Allegiance: Union
- Branch: Cavalry
- Engagements: Battle of Richmond; Battle of Perryville

The 9th Kentucky Cavalry Regiment was a cavalry regiment that served in the Union Army during the American Civil War.

== Service ==
The 9th Kentucky Cavalry Regiment was organized at Eminence, Kentucky, mustered in on August 22, 1862, under the command of Colonel Richard Taylor Jacob. The regiment was recruited, organized, and mustered into the service with 1,244 officers and men in less than three weeks. The regiment's greatest service came at the Battle of Richmond where along with the 9th Pennsylvania Cavalry, they covered the retreat of the Union Army of Kentucky.

The regiment was attached to 3rd Brigade, Cavalry Division, Army of the Ohio, to November 1862. District of Western Kentucky, Department of the Ohio to June 1863. 2nd Brigade, 3rd Division, XXIII Corps, Army of the Ohio, to August 1863. Eminence, Kentucky, 1st Division, XXIII Corps, to September 1863.

The 9th Kentucky Cavalry mustered out on September 11, 1863.

== Detailed service ==
Advance toward Richmond, Kentucky, August, 1862. Retreat to Shelbyville August 30-September 1. Pursuit of Bragg into Kentucky October 1–22. Near Clay Village October 4. Near Perryville October 6–7. Battle of Perryville October 8. Lawrenceburg October 8. Dog Walk, Chesser's Store, October 9. Capture of Harrodsburg October 11. Moved to Cumberland River and operating against Champ Ferguson until December. Operations against Morgan's Raid in Kentucky December 22, 1862 to January 2, 1863. Springfield, Kentucky, December 30 (detachment). Operations against Pegram March 22-April 1. Danville March 22 and 28. Expedition to Monticello and operations in southeastern Kentucky April 26-May 12. Cumberland River May 9. Pursuit of Morgan July 2–26. Marrowbone-Burkesville July 2. New Lisbon, Ohio, July 26. Duty at Eminence until September.

== Casualties ==
The regiment lost a total of 107 men during service; 5 enlisted men killed or mortally wounded, 1 officer and 101 enlisted men died of disease.

== Commanders ==
- Colonel Richard Taylor Jacob
- Lieutenant Colonel John Boyle

== See also ==
- List of Kentucky Union Civil War units
- Kentucky in the Civil War
