= The Fall of Hyperion: A Dream =

Unfinished epic poem by John Keats

The Fall of Hyperion: A Dream, sometimes subtitled as A Vision instead of a dream, is an epic poem written by the English Romantic John Keats. Although written right after Hyperion, it was published posthumously in 1856. Keats composed The Fall of Hyperion by reworking, expanding, and personally narrating lines from his earlier fragmented epic poem Hyperion.

The poem was abandoned before Keats's death.

== Plot ==
The poem begins with lyrical argument to introduce the work. In it, the narrator introduces the idea that the poem could be either a dream or a vision, and is unsure of which. The poem is divided into three scenes before its final fragmentation.

The poem's first scene opens with the poet narrator stumbling on a post-Edenic feast scene. This scene is reminiscent of the "sensory delight" mentioned in his early work, Sleep and Poetry, or of the "happy happy joy" experienced in Ode on a Grecian Urn. After enjoying the sensory delight, he is compelled to partake of a "cool vessel of transparent juice" that causes him to fall into a deep sleep.

Upon awakening, the poet narrator finds himself before a temple, with the gates to the East (the same direction as the gates of Eden) shut. He is challenged by a mysterious figure, Moneta, to climb upon stairs, which he experiences a painful death that is reminiscent of Apollo's pain when "dying into life" in Hyperion. Upon climbing, the poet narrator must overcome the desire to avoid suffering and dwell in spiritual pleasure in order to transcend the mistakes of false poets. Once the poet narrator makes it up the steps, he is questioned thoroughly by Moneta on the nature of poetry, on visions, and what one must do with their life, which reflects the second part of Sleep and Poetry, where the narrator has to condemn the false poets in each.

Once the poet has passed the test, Moneta allows the poet to witness a vision of the Titans and of Hyperion. This scene ends with the image of Hyperion rising, which leads to the beginning of the previous fragment, Hyperion.

== Influences ==
The plot and structure of The Fall of Hyperion has been greatly influenced by three previous epic works, Virgil's Aeneid, Milton's Paradise Lost, and Dante's Divine Comedy.

The structure of the quest for knowledge is based on Dante's use of Virgil's descent into Hades, and the language and narration style reflects this. However, Keats does not use a Christian understanding, but has an Apollonian basis to his poem, and Moneta forms the image of a sibyl and mimics Book 6 of the Aeneid.

The language and detail style is reminiscent of Paradise Lost, which, in many letters, Keats has stated was a quality epic, but dealt with morality on a simplistic level. The form and metre of Keats's epic is similar to Milton's.
