= John Keats =

English Romantic poet (1795–1821)

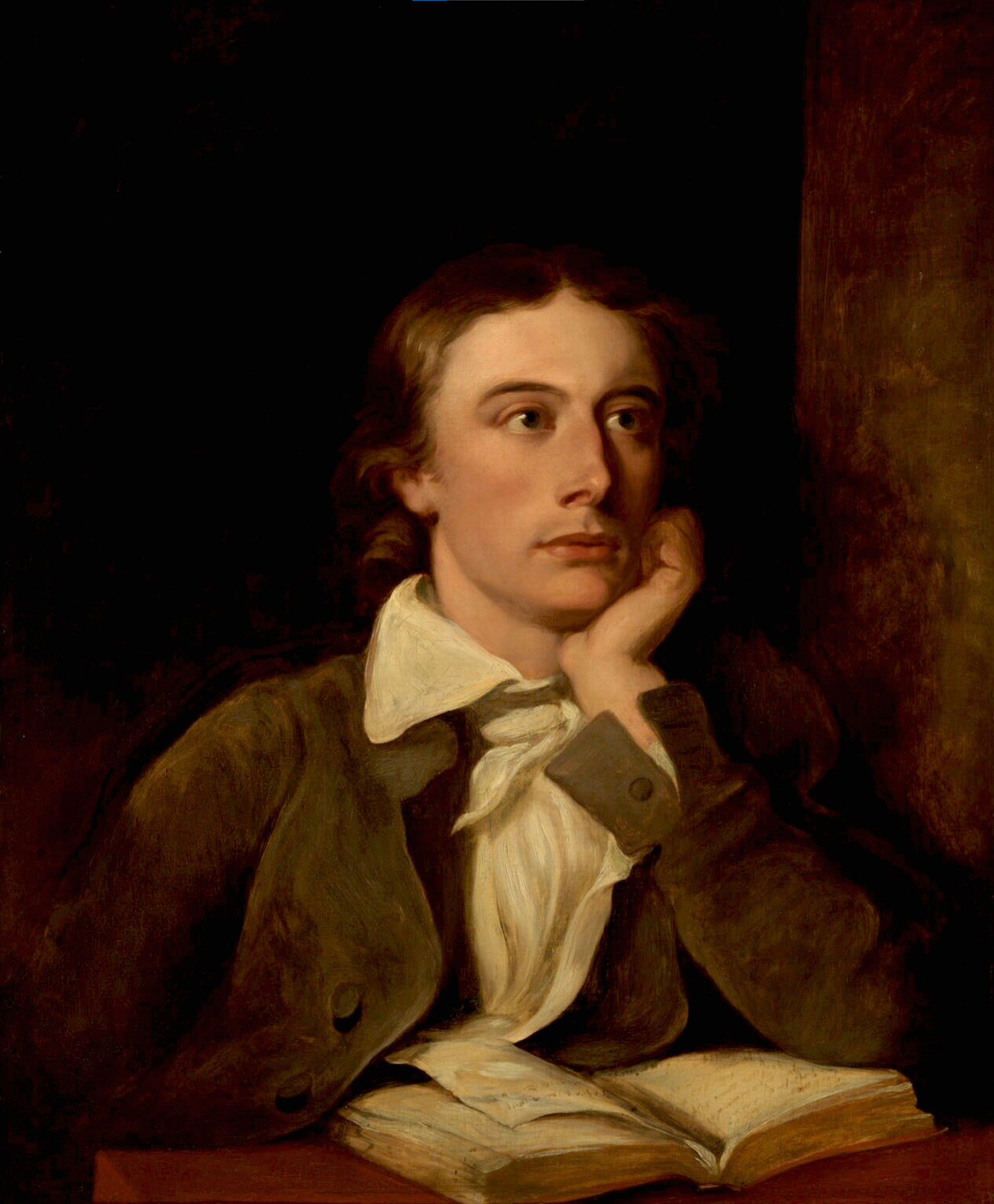
- Posthumous portrait by William Hilton, c. 1822
- Born: 31 October 1795; Moorgate, London, England
- Died: 23 February 1821 (aged 25); Rome, Papal States
- Education: Guy's Hospital
- Occupation: Poet
- Relatives: George Keats (brother)
- Writing career
- Movement: Romanticism

John Keats (31 October 1795 – 23 February 1821) was an English poet of the second generation of Romantic poets, along with Lord Byron and Percy Bysshe Shelley. His poems had been in publication for less than four years when he died of tuberculosis at the age of 25. They were indifferently received in his lifetime, but his fame grew rapidly after his death. By the end of the century, he was placed in the canon of English literature, strongly influencing many writers of the Pre-Raphaelite Brotherhood; the Encyclopædia Britannica of 1888 described his "Ode to a Nightingale" as "one of the final masterpieces".

Keats had a style "heavily loaded with sensualities", notably in the series of odes. As was typical of the Romantics, he accentuated extreme emotion through natural imagery. Today his poems and letters remain among the most popular and analysed in English literature – in particular "Ode to a Nightingale", "Ode on a Grecian Urn", "Sleep and Poetry" and the sonnet "On First Looking into Chapman's Homer". Jorge Luis Borges named his first time reading Keats an experience he felt all his life.

In the later Victorian era, Keats's medievalist poems, such as "La Belle Dame sans Merci" and "The Eve of St. Agnes", were a major influence on the Pre-Raphaelite movement, inspiring poets such as Algernon Charles Swinburne, Dante Gabriel Rossetti, and William Morris.

== Early life and education, 1795–1810 ==
John Keats was born in Moorgate, London, on 31 October 1795, to Thomas and Frances Keats (née Jennings). There is little evidence of his exact birthplace. Although Keats and his family seem to have marked his birthday on 29 October, baptism records give the date as the 31st. He was the eldest of four surviving children; his younger siblings were George (1797–1841), Thomas (1799–1818), and Frances Mary "Fanny" (1803–1889).

Another son died in infancy. His father first worked as an ostler at the stables attached to the Swan and Hoop Inn owned by his father-in-law, John Jennings, an establishment he later managed, and where the growing family lived for some years. Keats believed he was born at the inn, a birthplace of humble origins, but there is no evidence to support this. The Globe pub now occupies the site, a few yards from modern Moorgate station. (Note: The Globe pub itself now claims that Keats was born "in the stable next door.""Nicholson's Pub in London | The Globe". Nicholsons. Archived from the original on 6 August 2015.) Keats was baptised at St Botolph-without-Bishopsgate, and sent to a local dame school as a child.

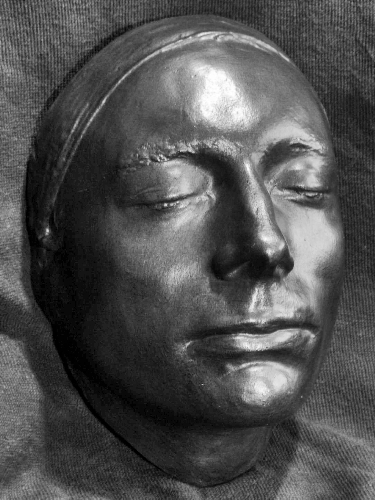
Life mask of Keats by Benjamin Haydon, 1816

His parents wished to send their sons to Eton or Harrow, but the family decided they could not afford the fees. In the summer of 1803, John was sent to board at John Clarke's school in Enfield, close to his grandparents' house. The small school had a liberal outlook and a progressive curriculum more modern than the larger, more prestigious schools. In the family atmosphere at Clarke's, Keats developed an interest in classics and history, which would stay with him throughout his short life.

The headmaster's son, Charles Cowden Clarke, also became an important mentor and friend, introducing Keats to Renaissance literature, including Tasso, Spenser, and Chapman's translations. The young Keats was described by his friend Edward Holmes as a volatile character, "always in extremes", given to indolence and fighting. At 13 he began focusing his energy on reading and study, winning his first academic prize in midsummer 1809.

In April 1804, when Keats was eight, his father died from a skull fracture after falling from his horse while returning from a visit to Keats and his brother George at school. Thomas Keats died intestate. Frances remarried two months later, but left her new husband soon afterwards, and the four children went to live with a grandmother, Alice Jennings, in the village of Edmonton.

In March 1810, when Keats was 14, his mother died of tuberculosis, leaving the children in their grandmother's custody. She appointed two guardians, Richard Abbey and John Sandell, for them. That autumn, Keats left Clarke's school to be an apprentice with Thomas Hammond, a surgeon and apothecary who was a neighbour and the doctor of the Jennings family. Keats lodged in the attic above the surgery, at 7 Church Street, until 1813. Cowden Clarke, who remained close to Keats, called this period "the most placid time in Keats' life."

From 1814 Keats had two bequests, held in trust for him until his 21st birthday. £800 was willed by his grandfather John Jennings. Also Keats's mother left a legacy of £8000 to be equally divided among her living children. (Note: Keats's share would have increased on the death of his brother Tom in 1818.) It seems he was not told of the £800 and probably knew nothing of it as he never applied for it. Historically, blame has often been laid on Abbey as legal guardian, but he may also have been unaware of it. William Walton, solicitor for Keats's mother and grandmother, definitely knew and had a duty of care to relay the information to Keats. It seems he did not, though it would have made a critical difference to the poet's expectations. Money was always a great concern and difficulty, as he struggled to stay out of debt and make his way in the world independently.

== Career ==
=== Medical training and writing poetry ===
On First Looking into Chapman's Homer
Much have I travell'd in the realms of gold,
And many goodly states and kingdoms seen;
Round many western islands have I been
Which bards in fealty to Apollo hold.
Oft of one wide expanse had I been told
That deep-browed Homer ruled as his demesne;
Yet did I never breathe its pure serene
Till I heard Chapman speak out loud and bold:
Then felt I like some watcher of the skies
When a new planet swims into his ken;
Or like stout Cortez when with eagle eyes
He star'd at the Pacific – and all his men
Look'd at each other with a wild surmise –
Silent, upon a peak in Darien.

— The sonnet "On First Looking into Chapman's Homer"
October 1816

In October 1815, having finished his five-year apprenticeship with Hammond, Keats registered as a medical student at Guy's Hospital, now part of King's College London, and began studying there. Within a month, he was accepted as a dresser at the hospital assisting surgeons during operations, the equivalent of a junior house surgeon today. It was a significant promotion, that marked a distinct aptitude for medicine; and it brought greater responsibility and a heavier workload.

Keats's long and expensive medical training with Hammond and at Guy's Hospital led his family to assume he would pursue a lifelong career in medicine, assuring financial security, and it seems that, at this point, Keats had a genuine desire to become a doctor. He lodged near the hospital, at 28 St Thomas's Street in Southwark, with other medical students, including Henry Stephens who gained fame as an inventor and ink magnate.

Keats's training took up increasing amounts of his writing time and he became increasingly ambivalent about it. He felt he was facing a stark choice. He had written his first extant poem, "An Imitation of Spenser", in 1814, when he was 19. Now, strongly drawn by ambition, inspired by fellow poets such as Leigh Hunt and Lord Byron, and beleaguered by family financial crises, he suffered periods of depression. His brother George wrote that John "feared that he should never be a poet, & if he was not he would destroy himself." In 1816, Keats received his apothecary's licence, which made him eligible to practise as an apothecary, physician and surgeon, but before the end of the year he informed his guardian that he resolved to be a poet, not a surgeon.

=== Publication and literary circles ===
Although he continued his work and training at Guy's, Keats devoted more and more time to the study of literature, experimenting with verse forms, particularly the sonnet. In May 1816, Leigh Hunt agreed to publish the sonnet "O Solitude" in his magazine The Examiner, a leading liberal magazine of the day. This was the first appearance of Keats's poetry in print; Charles Cowden Clarke called it his friend's red letter day, first proof that Keats's ambitions were valid. Among his poems of 1816 was To My Brothers. That summer, Keats went with Clarke to the seaside town of Margate to write. There he began "Calidore" and initiated an era of great letter writing. On returning to London, he took lodgings at 8 Dean Street, Southwark, and braced himself to study further for membership of the Royal College of Surgeons.

In October 1816 Clarke introduced Keats to the influential Leigh Hunt, a close friend of Byron and Shelley. Five months later came the publication of Poems, the first volume of Keats's verse, which included "I stood tiptoe" and "Sleep and Poetry", both strongly influenced by Hunt. The book was a critical failure, arousing little interest, although Reynolds reviewed it favourably in The Champion. Clarke commented that the book "might have emerged in Timbuctoo."

Keats's publishers, Charles and James Ollier, felt ashamed of it. Keats immediately changed publishers to Taylor and Hessey in Fleet Street. Unlike the Olliers, Keats's new publishers were enthusiastic about his work. Within a month of the publication of Poems they were planning a new Keats volume and had paid him an advance. Hessey became a steady friend to Keats and made the company's rooms available for young writers to meet. Their publishing lists came to include Coleridge, Hazlitt, Clare, Hogg, Carlyle and Charles Lamb.

Through Taylor and Hessey, Keats met their Eton-educated lawyer, Richard Woodhouse, who advised them on literary as well as legal matters and was deeply impressed by Poems. Although he noted that Keats could be "wayward, trembling, easily daunted," Woodhouse was convinced of Keats's genius, a poet to support as he became one of England's greatest writers. Soon after they met, the two became close friends, and Woodhouse started to collect Keatsiana, documenting as much as he could about the poetry. This archive survives as one of the main sources of information on Keats's work. Andrew Motion represents him as Boswell to Keats's Johnson, ceaselessly promoting his work, fighting his corner and spurring his poetry to greater heights. In later years, Woodhouse was one of the few to accompany Keats to Gravesend, Kent, to embark on his final trip to Rome.

Despite the bad reviews of Poems, Hunt published the essay "Three Young Poets" (Shelley, Keats, and Reynolds) and the sonnet "On First Looking into Chapman's Homer", foreseeing great things to come. He introduced Keats to many prominent men in his circle, including the editor of The Times, Thomas Barnes; the writer Charles Lamb; the conductor Vincent Novello; and the poet John Hamilton Reynolds, who would become a close friend. Keats also met regularly with William Hazlitt, a powerful literary figure of the day. It was a turning point for Keats, establishing him in the public eye as a figure in what Hunt termed "a new school of poetry".

At this time Keats wrote to his friend Bailey, "I am certain of nothing but the holiness of the Heart's affections and the truth of the imagination. What imagination seizes as Beauty must be truth." This passage would eventually be transmuted into the concluding lines of "Ode on a Grecian Urn": "'Beauty is truth, truth beauty' – that is all / Ye know on earth, and all ye need to know". In early December 1816, under the heady influence of his artistic friends, Keats told Abbey he had decided to give up medicine in favour of poetry, to Abbey's fury. Keats had spent a great deal on his medical training, and despite his state of financial hardship and indebtedness, made large loans to friends such as the painter Benjamin Haydon. Keats would go on to lend £700 to his brother George. By lending so much, Keats could no longer cover the interest of his own debts.

=== Travelling and ill health ===
Having left his training at the hospital, suffering from a succession of colds, and unhappy with living in damp rooms in London, Keats moved with his brothers into rooms at 1 Well Walk in the village of Hampstead in April 1817. There John and George nursed their tubercular brother Tom. The house was close to Hunt and others of his circle in Hampstead, and to Coleridge, respected elder of the first wave of Romantic poets, then living in Highgate. On 11 April 1818, Keats reported that he and Coleridge had taken a long walk on Hampstead Heath. In a letter to his brother George, he wrote that they had talked about "a thousand things, ... nightingales, poetry, poetical sensation, metaphysics." Around this time he was introduced to Charles Wentworth Dilke and James Rice.

In June 1818, Keats began a walking tour of Scotland, Ireland and the Lake District with Charles Armitage Brown. Keats's brother George and his wife Georgiana accompanied them to Lancaster and then continued to Liverpool, from where they migrated to America, living in Ohio and Louisville, Kentucky, until 1841, when George's investments failed. Like Keats's other brother, they both died penniless and racked by tuberculosis, for which there was no effective treatment until the next century.

In July, while on the Isle of Mull, Keats caught a severe cold and "was too thin and fevered to proceed on the journey." After returning south in August, Keats continued to nurse Tom, so exposing himself to infection. Some have suggested this was when tuberculosis, his "family disease", took hold. "Consumption" was not identified as a disease with a single infectious origin until 1820. There was considerable stigma attached to it, as it was often tied with weakness, repressed sexual passion or masturbation. Keats "refuses to give it a name" in his letters. Tom Keats died on 1 December 1818.

=== Wentworth Place: annus mirabilis ===
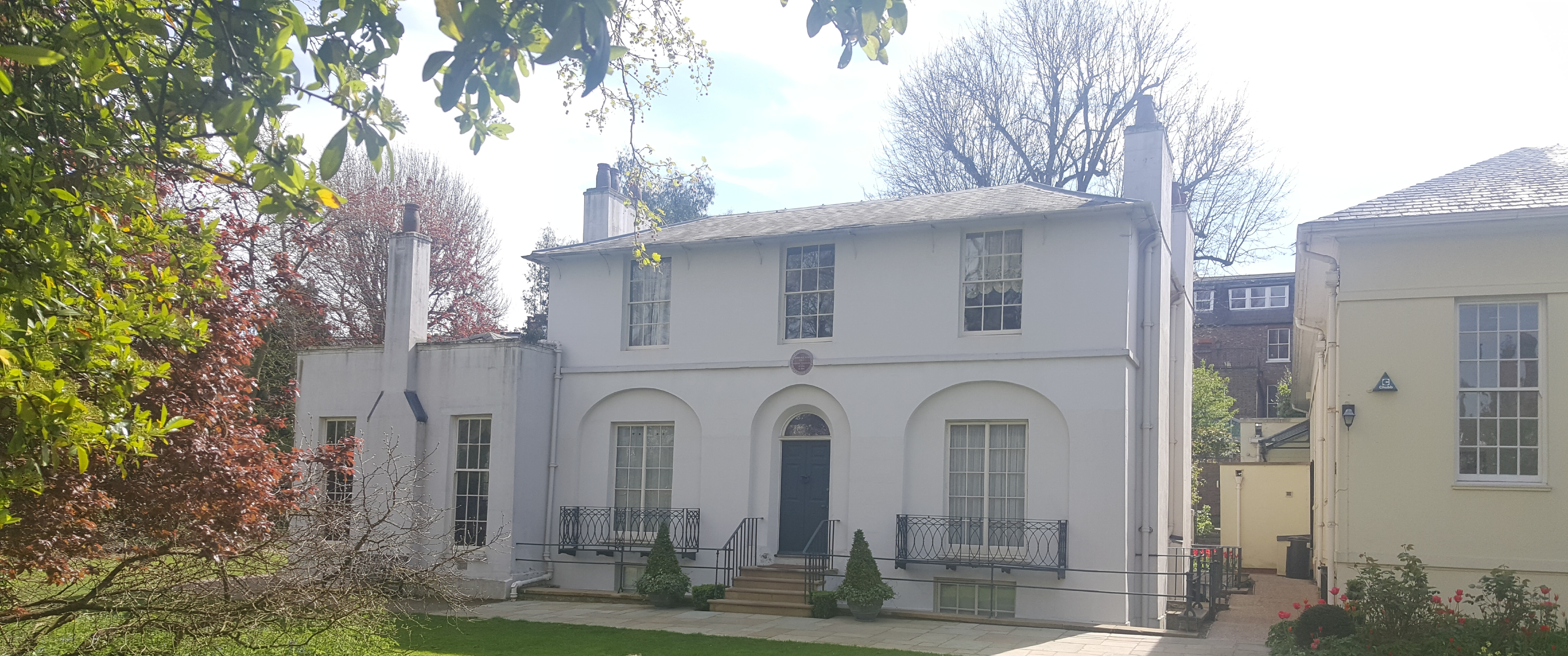
Wentworth Place, now the Keats House museum (left), Ten Keats Grove (right), Hampstead Heath, London

John Keats moved to the newly built Wentworth Place, owned by his friend Charles Armitage Brown. It was on the edge of Hampstead Heath, ten minutes' walk south of his old home in Well Walk. The winter of 1818–19, though a difficult period for the poet, marked the beginning of his annus mirabilis in which he wrote his most mature work. He had been inspired by a series of recent lectures by Hazlitt on English poets and poetic identity and had also met Wordsworth. Keats may have seemed to his friends to be living on comfortable means, but in reality he was borrowing regularly from Abbey and his friends.

He composed five of his six great odes at Wentworth Place in April and May and, although it is debated in which order they were written, "Ode to Psyche" opened the published series. According to Brown, "Ode to a Nightingale" was composed under a plum tree in the garden. (Note: The original plum tree no longer survives, though others have been planted since.)

Brown wrote, "In the spring of 1819 a nightingale had built her nest near my house. Keats felt a tranquil and continual joy in her song; and one morning he took his chair from the breakfast-table to the grass-plot under a plum-tree, where he sat for two or three hours. When he came into the house, I perceived he had some scraps of paper in his hand, and these he was quietly thrusting behind the books. On inquiry, I found those scraps, four or five in number, contained his poetic feelings on the song of our nightingale." Dilke, co-owner of the house, strenuously denied the story, printed in Richard Monckton Milnes's 1848 biography of Keats, dismissing it as 'pure delusion'.

My heart aches, and a drowsy numbness pains
My sense, as though of hemlock I had drunk,
Or emptied some dull opiate to the drains
One minute past, and Lethe-wards had sunk:
'Tis not through envy of thy happy lot,
But being too happy in thine happiness, –
That thou, light-winged Dryad of the trees,
In some melodious plot
Of beechen green, and shadows numberless,
Singest of summer in full-throated ease.

— First stanza of "Ode to a Nightingale",
May 1819

"Ode on a Grecian Urn" and "Ode on Melancholy" were inspired by sonnet forms and probably written after "Ode to a Nightingale". Keats's new and progressive publishers Taylor and Hessey issued Endymion, which Keats dedicated to Thomas Chatterton, a work that he termed "a trial of my Powers of Imagination". It was damned by the critics, giving rise to Byron's quip that Keats was ultimately "snuffed out by an article", suggesting that he never truly got over it. A particularly harsh review by John Wilson Croker appeared in the April 1818 edition of the Quarterly Review. (Note: The Quarterly Review. April 1818, pp. 204–208. "It is not, we say, that the author has not powers of language, rays of fancy, and gleams of genius – he has all these; but he is unhappily a disciple of the new school of what has been somewhere called 'Cockney Poetry'; which may be defined to consist of the most incongruous ideas in the most uncouth language.... There is hardly a complete couplet enclosing a complete idea in the whole book. He wanders from one subject to another, from the association, not of ideas, but of sounds.")

John Gibson Lockhart writing in Blackwood's Magazine, described Endymion as "imperturbable drivelling idiocy". With biting sarcasm, Lockhart advised, "It is a better and a wiser thing to be a starved apothecary than a starved poet; so back to the shop Mr John, back to plasters, pills, and ointment boxes." (Note: Extractsfrom Blackwood's Edinburgh Magazine, 3 (1818) pp. 519–524. Nineteenth Century Literary Manuscripts, Part 4. Retrieved 29 January 2010. "To witness the disease of any human understanding, however feeble, is distressing; but the spectacle of an able mind reduced to a state of insanity is, of course, ten times more afflicting. It is with such sorrow as this that we have contemplated the case of Mr John Keats.... He was bound apprentice some years ago to a worthy apothecary in town. But all has been undone by a sudden attack of the malady ... For some time we were in hopes that he might get off with a violent fit or two; but of late the symptoms are terrible. The phrenzy of the "Poems" was bad enough in its way; but it did not alarm us half so seriously as the calm, settled, imperturbable drivelling idiocy of Endymion.... It is a better and a wiser thing to be a starved apothecary than a starved poet; so back to the [apothecary] shop Mr John, back to 'plasters, pills, and ointment boxes' ".)

It was Lockhart at Blackwoods who coined the defamatory term "the Cockney School" for Hunt and his circle, which included both Hazlitt and Keats. The dismissal was as much political as literary, aimed at upstart young writers deemed uncouth for their lack of education, non-formal rhyming and "low diction". They had not attended Eton, Harrow or Oxbridge and they were not from the upper classes.

In 1819 Keats wrote "The Eve of St. Agnes", "La Belle Dame sans Merci", "Hyperion", "Lamia" and a play, Otho the Great, critically damned and not performed until 1950. The poems "Fancy" and "Bards of passion and of mirth" were inspired by the garden of Wentworth Place. In September, very short of money and in despair considering taking up journalism or a post as a ship's surgeon, he approached his publishers with a new book of poems.

They were unimpressed with the collection, finding the presented versions of "Lamia" confusing, and describing "St Agnes" as having a "sense of pettish disgust" and "a 'Don Juan' style of mingling up sentiment and sneering" concluding it was "a poem unfit for ladies". The final volume Keats lived to see published, Lamia, Isabella, The Eve of St. Agnes, and Other Poems, was published in July 1820. It received greater acclaim than had Endymion or Poems, finding favourable notices in both The Examiner and Edinburgh Review. It came to be recognised as one of the most important poetic works ever published.

Wentworth Place now houses the Keats House museum.

=== Isabella Jones and Fanny Brawne, 1817–1820 ===
Keats befriended Isabella Jones in May 1817, while on holiday in the village of Bo Peep, near Hastings. She is described as beautiful, talented and widely read, not of the top flight of society yet financially secure, an enigmatic figure who would become a part of Keats's circle. Throughout their friendship Keats never hesitated to own his sexual attraction to her, although they seemed to enjoy circling each other rather than offering commitment. He writes that he "frequented her rooms" in the winter of 1818–19, and in his letters to George says that he "warmed with her" and "kissed her".

The trysts may have been a sexual initiation for Keats according to Bate and Robert Gittings. Jones inspired and was a steward of Keats's writing. The themes of "The Eve of St. Agnes" and "The Eve of St Mark" may well have been suggested by her, the lyric Hush, Hush! ["o sweet Isabel"] was about her, and that the first version of "Bright Star" may have originally been for her. In 1821, Jones was one of the first in England to be notified of Keats's death.

Letters and drafts of poems suggest that Keats first met Frances (Fanny) Brawne between September and November 1818. It is likely that the 18-year-old Brawne visited the Dilke family at Wentworth Place before she lived there. She was born in the hamlet of West End, now in the district of West Hampstead, on 9 August 1800. Like Keats's grandfather, her grandfather kept a London inn, and both lost several family members to tuberculosis. She shared her first name with both Keats's sister and mother, and had a talent for dress-making and languages as well as a natural theatrical bent. During November 1818 she developed an intimacy with Keats, but it was shadowed by the illness of Tom Keats, whom John was nursing through this period.

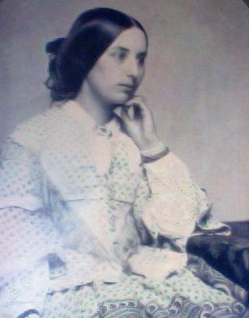
An ambrotype of Fanny Brawne taken circa 1850 (photograph on glass)

On 3 April 1819, Brawne and her widowed mother moved into the other half of Dilke's Wentworth Place, and Keats and Brawne were able to see each other every day. Keats began to lend Brawne books, such as Dante's Inferno, and they would read together. He gave her the love sonnet "Bright Star" (perhaps revised for her) as a declaration. It was a work in progress which he continued until the last months of his life, and the poem came to be associated with their relationship. "All his desires were concentrated on Fanny". From this point there is no further documented mention of Isabella Jones.

Sometime before the end of June, he arrived at some sort of understanding with Brawne, far from a formal engagement as he still had too little to offer, with no prospects and financial stricture. Keats endured great conflict knowing his expectations as a struggling poet in increasingly hard straits would preclude marriage to Brawne. Their love remained unconsummated; jealousy for his 'star' began to gnaw at him. Darkness, disease and depression surrounded him, reflected in poems such as "The Eve of St. Agnes" and "La Belle Dame sans Merci" where love and death both stalk. "I have two luxuries to brood over in my walks;" he wrote to her, "your loveliness, and the hour of my death".

In one of his many hundreds of notes and letters, Keats wrote to Brawne on 13 October 1819: "My love has made me selfish. I cannot exist without you – I am forgetful of every thing but seeing you again – my Life seems to stop there – I see no further. You have absorb'd me. I have a sensation at the present moment as though I was dissolving – I should be exquisitely miserable without the hope of soon seeing you ... I have been astonished that Men could die Martyrs for religion – I have shudder'd at it – I shudder no more – I could be martyr'd for my Religion – Love is my religion – I could die for that – I could die for you."

Tuberculosis took hold and he was advised by his doctors to move to a warmer climate. In September 1820 Keats left for Rome knowing he would probably never see Brawne again. After leaving he felt unable to write to her or read her letters, although he did correspond with her mother. He died there five months later. None of Brawne's letters to Keats survive.

It took a month for the news of his death to reach London, after which Brawne stayed in mourning for six years. In 1833, more than 12 years after his death, she married and went on to have three children; she outlived Keats by more than 40 years.

== Last months: Rome, 1820 ==
During 1820 Keats displayed increasingly serious symptoms of tuberculosis, suffering two lung haemorrhages in the first few days of February. On first coughing up blood, on 3 February 1820, he said to Charles Armitage Brown, "I know the colour of that blood! It is arterial blood. I cannot be deceived in that colour. That drop of blood is my death warrant. I must die."

He lost large amounts of blood and was bled further by the attending physician. Hunt nursed him in London for much of the following summer. At the suggestion of his doctors, he agreed to move to Italy with his friend Joseph Severn. On 13 September, they left for Gravesend and four days later boarded the sailing brig Maria Crowther. On 1 October the ship landed at Lulworth Bay or Holworth Bay, where the two went ashore; back on board ship he made the final revisions of "Bright Star".

The journey was a minor catastrophe: storms broke out, followed by a dead calm that slowed the ship's progress. When they finally docked in Naples, the ship was held in quarantine for ten days due to a suspected outbreak of cholera in Britain. Keats reached Rome on 14 November, by which time any hope of the warmer climate he sought had disappeared.

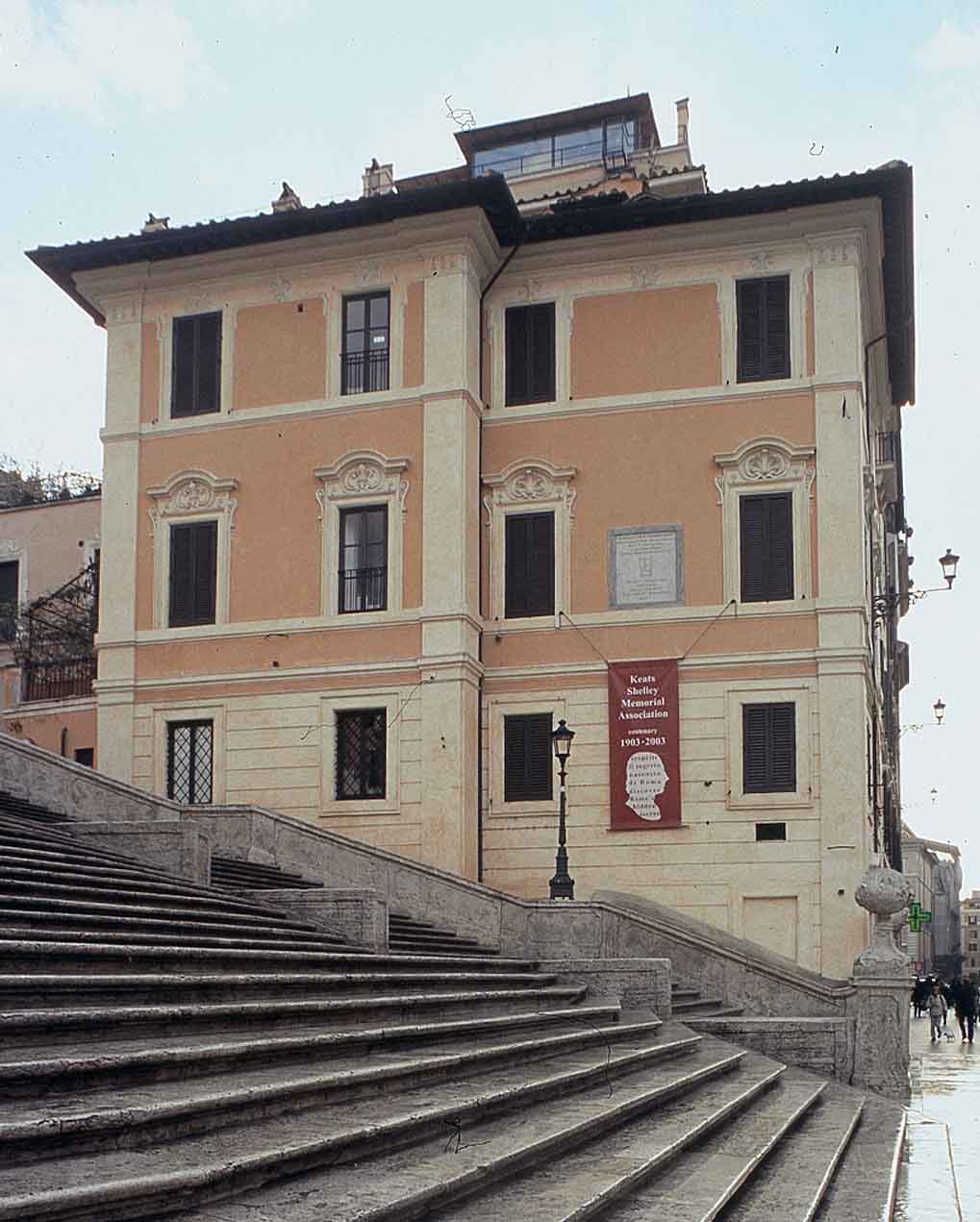
Keats's house in Rome

Keats wrote his last letter on 30 November 1820 to Charles Armitage Brown; "Tis the most difficult thing in the world to me to write a letter. My stomach continues so bad, that I feel it worse on opening any book – yet I am much better than I was in Quarantine. Then I am afraid to encounter the proing and conning of any thing interesting to me in England. I have an habitual feeling of my real life having past, and that I am leading a posthumous existence".

On arrival in Italy, he moved into a villa on the Spanish Steps in Rome, today the Keats–Shelley Memorial House museum. Despite care from Severn and Dr. James Clark, his health rapidly deteriorated. The medical attention Keats received may have hastened his death. In November 1820, Clark declared that the source of his illness was "mental exertion" and that the source was largely situated in his stomach. Clark eventually diagnosed consumption (tuberculosis) and placed Keats on a starvation diet of an anchovy and a piece of bread a day intended to reduce the blood flow to his stomach. He also bled the poet: a standard treatment of the day, but also likely a significant contributor to Keats's weakness.

Severn's biographer Sue Brown writes: "They could have used opium in small doses, and Keats had asked Severn to buy a bottle of opium when they were setting off on their voyage. What Severn didn't realise was that Keats saw it as a possible resource if he wanted to commit suicide. He tried to get the bottle from Severn on the voyage but Severn wouldn't let him have it. Then in Rome he tried again.... Severn was in such a quandary he didn't know what to do, so in the end he went to the doctor, who took it away. As a result Keats went through dreadful agonies with nothing to ease the pain at all." Keats was angry with both Severn and Clark when they would not give him laudanum (opium). He repeatedly demanded, "How long is this posthumous existence of mine to go on?"

== Death, 1821 ==
The first months of 1821 marked a slow and steady decline into the final stage of tuberculosis. His autopsy showed his lung almost disintegrated. Keats was coughing up blood and covered in sweat. Severn nursed him devotedly and observed in a letter how Keats would sometimes cry upon waking to find himself still alive. Severn writes,

Keats raves till I am in a complete tremble for him... about four, the approaches of death came on. [Keats said] "Severn – I – lift me up – I am dying – I shall die easy; don't be frightened – be firm, and thank God it has come." I lifted him up in my arms. The phlegm seem'd boiling in his throat, and increased until eleven, when he gradually sank into death, so quiet, that I still thought he slept.

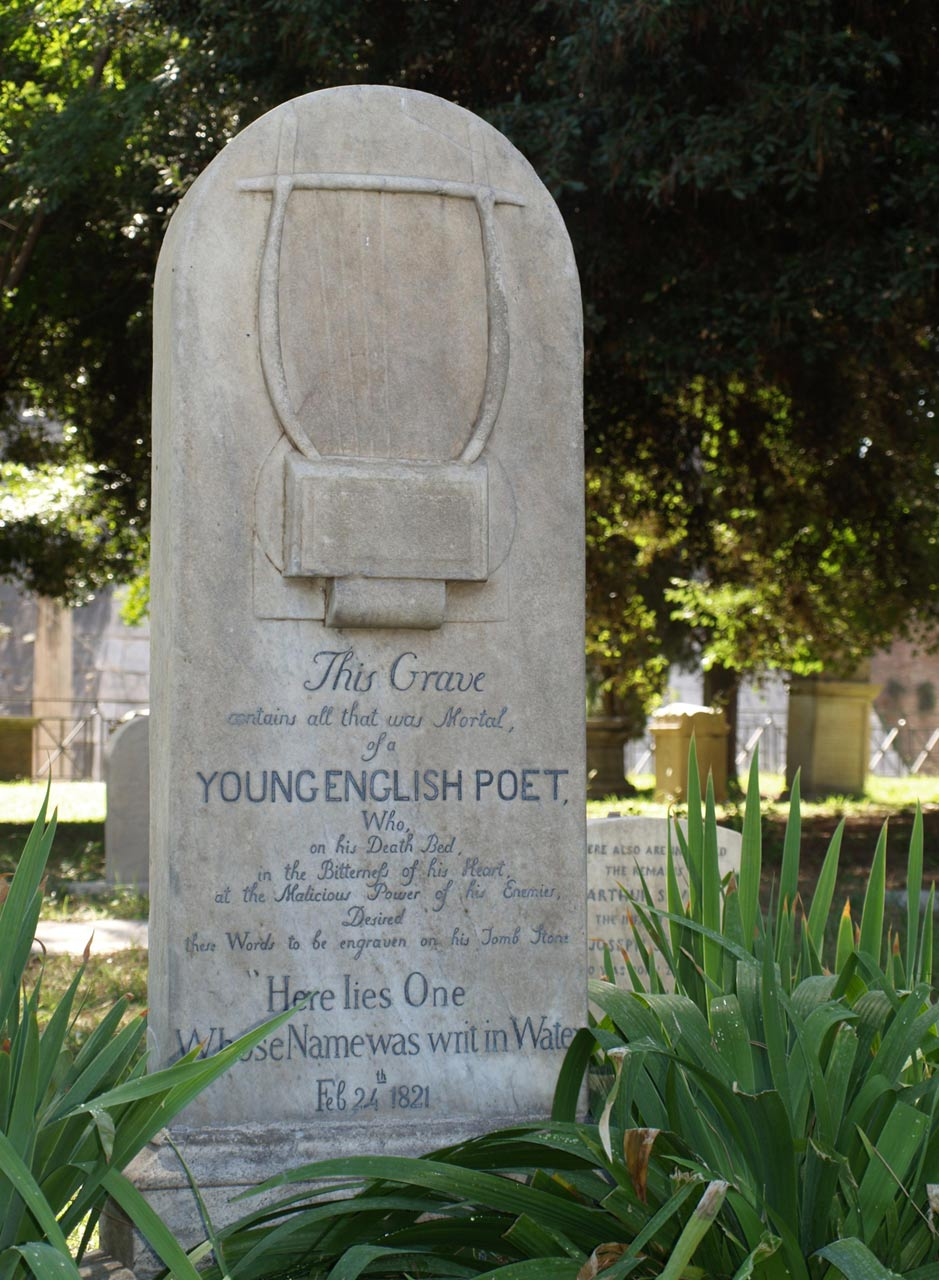
Keats's grave in Rome

John Keats died in Rome on 23 February 1821. His body was buried in the city's Protestant Cemetery. His last request was to be placed under a tombstone bearing no name or date, only the words, "Here lies One whose Name was writ in Water." Severn and Brown erected the stone, which under a relief of a lyre with broken strings, includes the epitaph:

This Grave / contains all that was Mortal, / of a / YOUNG ENGLISH POET, / Who, / on his Death Bed, / in the Bitterness of his Heart, / at the Malicious Power of his Enemies, / Desired / these Words to be engraven on his Tomb Stone / Here lies One / Whose Name was writ in Water / Feb 24th 1821

Severn and Brown added their lines to the stone in protest at the critical reception of Keats's work. Hunt blamed his death on the Quarterly Review's scathing attack of "Endymion". As Byron quipped in his narrative poem Don Juan;

'Tis strange the mind, that very fiery particle
Should let itself be snuffed out by an article.
(canto 11, stanza 60)

Seven weeks after the funeral, Shelley memorialised Keats in his poem Adonais. Clark saw to a planting of daisies on the grave, saying Keats would have wished it. For public health reasons, the Italian health authorities burnt the furniture in Keats's room, scraped the walls and made new windows, doors and flooring. The ashes of Shelley, one of Keats's most fervent champions, are buried in the cemetery and Joseph Severn is buried next to Keats. In 2009, Stefanie Marsh wrote, "In the old part of the graveyard, barely a field when Keats was buried here, there are now umbrella pines, myrtle shrubs, roses, and carpets of wild violets".

== Reception ==
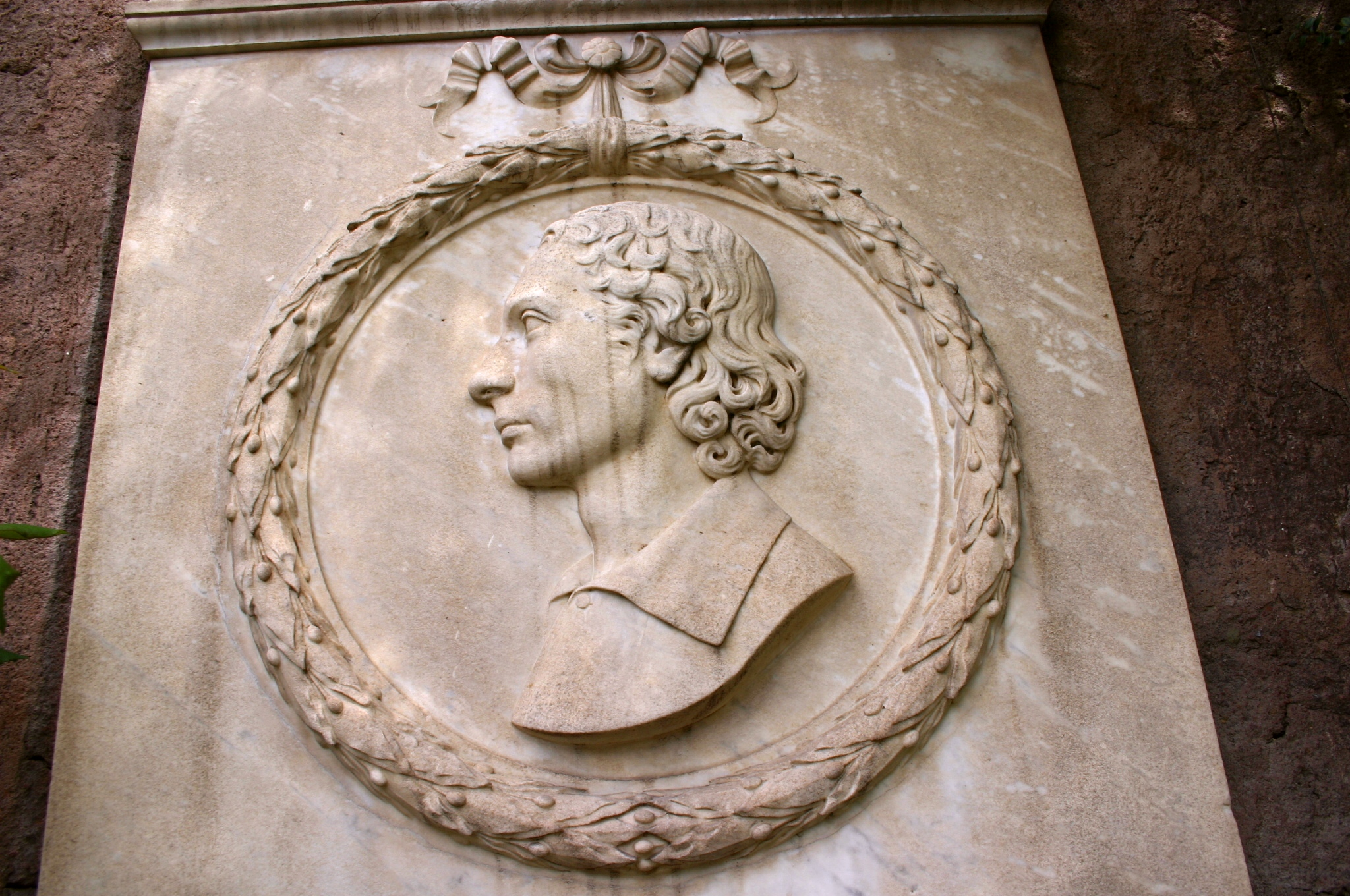
A relief of Keats on a wall near his grave in Rome

When Keats died at 25, he had been writing poetry seriously for only about six years, from 1814 until the summer of 1820, and publishing for only four. In his lifetime, sales of Keats's three volumes of poetry probably amounted to only 200 copies. His first poem, the sonnet O Solitude, appeared in the Examiner in May 1816, while his collection Lamia, Isabella, The Eve of St. Agnes and other poems was published in July 1820 before his last visit to Rome. The compression of his poetic apprenticeship and maturity into so short a time is just one remarkable aspect of Keats's work.

Although prolific during his short career, and now one of the most studied and admired British poets, his reputation rests on a small body of work, centred on the Odes, and only in the creative outpouring of the last years of his short life was he able to express the inner intensity for which he has been lauded since his death. Keats was convinced that he had made no mark in his lifetime. Aware that he was dying, he wrote to Fanny Brawne in February 1820, "I have left no immortal work behind me – nothing to make my friends proud of my memory – but I have lov'd the principle of beauty in all things, and if I had had time I would have made myself remember'd."

Keats's ability and talent was acknowledged by several influential contemporary allies such as Shelley and Hunt. His admirers praised him for thinking "on his pulses", for having developed a style which was more heavily loaded with sensualities, more gorgeous in its effects, more voluptuously alive than any poet who had come before him: "loading every rift with ore". Shelley often corresponded with Keats in Rome and loudly declared that Keats's death had been brought on by bad reviews in the Quarterly Review. Seven weeks after the funeral he wrote Adonais, a despairing elegy, stating that Keats's early death was a personal and public tragedy:

The loveliest and the last,
The bloom, whose petals nipped before they blew
Died on the promise of the fruit.

Although Keats wrote that "if poetry comes not as naturally as the Leaves to a tree it had better not come at all," poetry did not come easily to him; his work was the fruit of a deliberate and prolonged classical self-education. He may have possessed an innate poetic sensibility, but his early works were clearly those of a young man learning his craft. His first attempts at verse were often vague, languorously narcotic and lacking a clear eye. His poetic sense was based on the conventional tastes of his friend Charles Cowden Clarke, who first introduced him to the classics, and also came from the predilections of Hunt's Examiner, which Keats read as a boy.

Hunt scorned the Augustan or "French" school dominated by Pope and attacked earlier Romantic poets Wordsworth and Coleridge, now in their forties, as unsophisticated, obscure and crude writers. During Keats's few years as a published poet, the reputation of the older Romantic school was at its lowest ebb. Keats came to echo these sentiments in his work, identifying himself with a "new school" for a time, somewhat alienating him from Wordsworth, Coleridge and Byron and providing a basis for scathing attacks from Blackwood's and the Quarterly Review.

Season of mists and mellow fruitfulness
Close bosom-friend of the maturing sun
Conspiring with him how to load and bless
With fruit the vines that round the thatch-eaves run;
To bend with apples the moss'd cottage-trees,
And fill all fruit with ripeness to the core;
To swell the gourd, and plump the hazel shells
With a sweet kernel; to set budding more,
And still more, later flowers for the bees,
Until they think warm days will never cease,
For Summer has o'er-brimm'd their clammy cells.

— First stanza of "To Autumn",
September 1819

By his death, Keats had therefore been associated with the taints of both old and new schools: the obscurity of first-wave Romantics and uneducated affectation of Hunt's "Cockney School". Keats's posthumous reputation mixed the reviewers' caricature of the simplistic bumbler with the image of a hyper-sensitive genius killed by high feeling, which Shelley later portrayed.

The Victorian sense of poetry as the work of indulgence and luxuriant fancy offered a schema into which Keats was posthumously fitted. Marked as the standard-bearer of sensory writing, his reputation grew steadily and remarkably. His work had the full support of the influential Cambridge Apostles, whose members included the young Tennyson, (Note: Tennyson was writing Keats-style poetry in the 1830s and was being critically attacked in the same manner as his predecessor.) later a popular Poet Laureate who came to regard Keats as the greatest poet of the 19th century. Constance Naden was a great admirer of his poems, arguing that his genius lay in his 'exquisite sensitiveness to all the elements of beauty'.

In 1848, twenty-seven years after Keats's death, Richard Monckton Milnes published the first full biography, which helped place Keats within the canon of English literature. The Pre-Raphaelite Brotherhood, including Millais and Rossetti, were inspired by Keats and painted scenes from his poems including "The Eve of St. Agnes", "Isabella" and "La Belle Dame sans Merci": lush, arresting and popular images which remain closely associated with Keats's work.

In 1882, Swinburne wrote in the Encyclopædia Britannica that "the Ode to a Nightingale [was] one of the final masterpieces of human work in all time and for all ages". In the 20th century, Keats's poetry remained a direct creative model for writers like W.B. Yeats and Wilfred Owen—the latter of whom kept Keats's death date as a day of mourning—while T.S. Eliot found a vital blueprint for modernist theory not in Keats's verse, but in the poetic philosophy of his letters. Critic Helen Vendler stated the odes "are a group of works in which the English language finds an ultimate embodiment." Bate said of To Autumn: "Each generation has found it one of the most nearly perfect poems in English" and M. R. Ridley said the ode "is the most serenely flawless poem in our language."

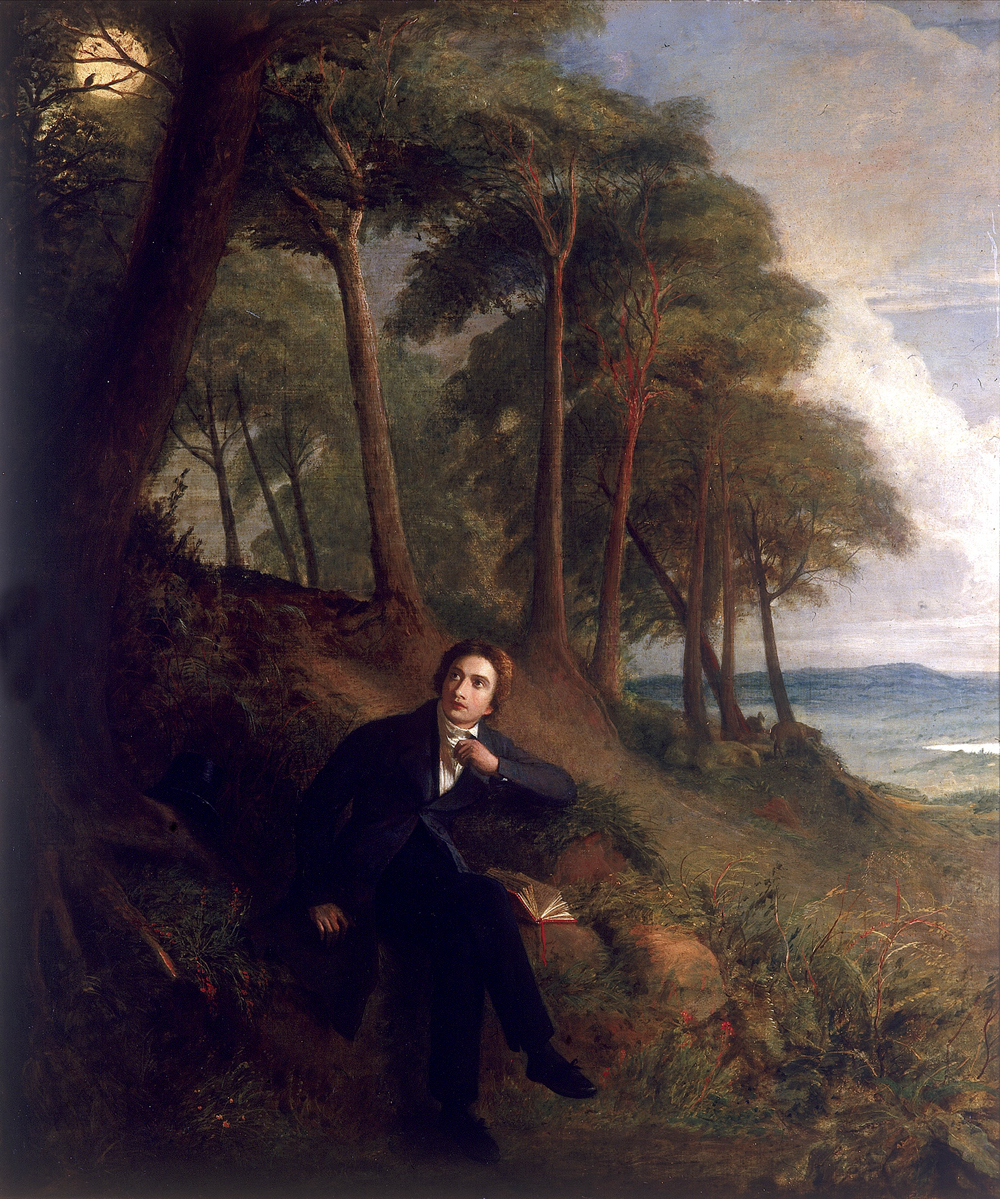
Keats Listening to a Nightingale on Hampstead Heath by Joseph Severn, 1845

The largest collection of the letters, manuscripts, and other papers of Keats is in the Houghton Library at Harvard University. Other collections of material are archived at the British Library, Keats House, Hampstead, the Keats–Shelley Memorial House in Rome and the Pierpont Morgan Library in New York. Since 1998 the British Keats-Shelley Memorial Association have annually awarded a prize for romantic poetry. A Royal Society of Arts blue plaque was unveiled in 1896 to commemorate Keats at Keats House.

Jorge Luis Borges named his first encounter with Keats an experience he felt all his life.

=== Biographers ===
None of Keats's biographies were written by people who had known him. Shortly after his death, his publishers announced they would speedily publish The memoirs and remains of John Keats but his friends refused to cooperate and argued with each other to such an extent that the project was abandoned. Leigh Hunt's Lord Byron and some of his Contemporaries (1828) gives the first biographical account, strongly emphasising Keats's supposedly humble origins, a misconception which still continues. Given that he was becoming a significant figure within artistic circles, a succession of other publications followed, including anthologies of his many notes, chapters and letters.

However, early accounts often gave contradictory or biased versions of events and were subject to dispute. His friends Brown, Severn, Dilke, Shelley and his guardian Richard Abbey, his publisher Taylor, Fanny Brawne and many others issued posthumous commentary on Keats's life. These early writings coloured all subsequent biography and have become embedded in a body of Keats legend.

Shelley promoted Keats as someone whose achievement could not be separated from agony, who was 'spiritualised' by his decline and too fine-tuned to endure the harshness of life; the consumptive, suffering image popularly held today. The first full biography was published in 1848 by Richard Monckton Milnes. Landmark Keats biographers since include Sidney Colvin, Robert Gittings, Walter Jackson Bate, Aileen Ward, and Andrew Motion. The idealised image of the heroic romantic poet who battled poverty and died young was inflated by the late arrival of an authoritative biography and the lack of an accurate likeness. Most of the surviving portraits of Keats were painted after his death, and those who knew him held that they did not succeed in capturing his unique quality and intensity.

=== Other portrayals ===
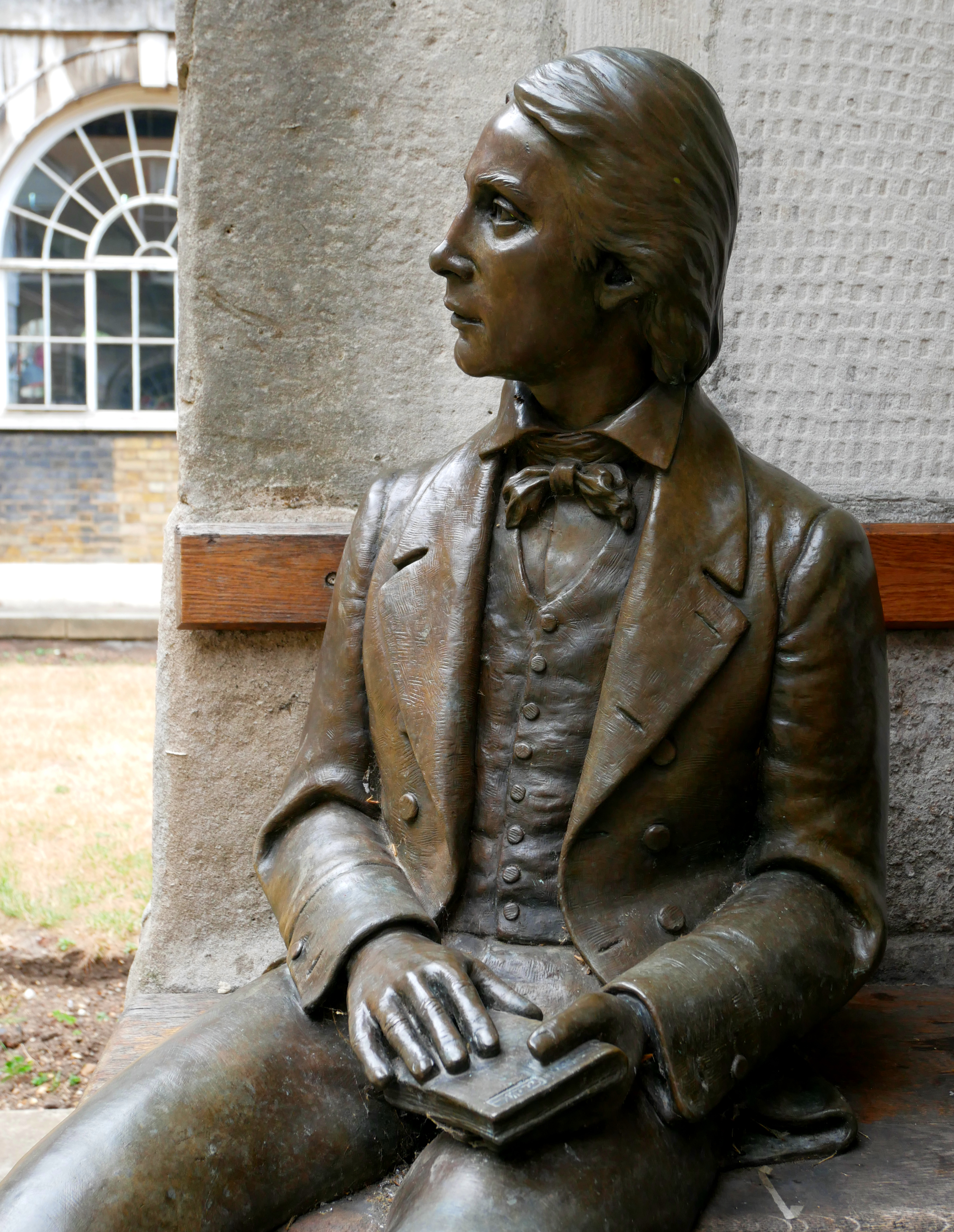
Sculpture of Keats, seated on bench, at Guys and Saint Thomas' Hospital, London

John Keats: His Life and Death, the first major motion picture about the life of Keats, was produced in 1973 by Encyclopædia Britannica, Inc. It was directed by John Barnes. John Stride played John Keats and Janina Faye played Fanny Brawne. The 2009 film Bright Star, written and directed by Jane Campion, focuses on Keats's relationship with Fanny Brawne. Inspired by the 1997 Keats biography by Andrew Motion, Ben Whishaw played Keats and Abbie Cornish played Fanny.

Poet Laureate Simon Armitage wrote "'I speak as someone...'" to commemorate the 200th anniversary of Keats's death. It was first published in The Times on 20 February 2021. In 2007 a sculpture of Keats seated on a bench, by sculptor Stuart Williamson, was unveiled at Guys and Saint Thomas' Hospital, London by the Poet Laureate, Andrew Motion.

A sculpture of the 21-year-old Keats, by Martin Jennings, was unveiled by Michael Mainelli, the Lord Mayor of London, in Moorgate in the City of London on 31 October 2024, the 229th anniversary of Keats's birth.

== Letters ==
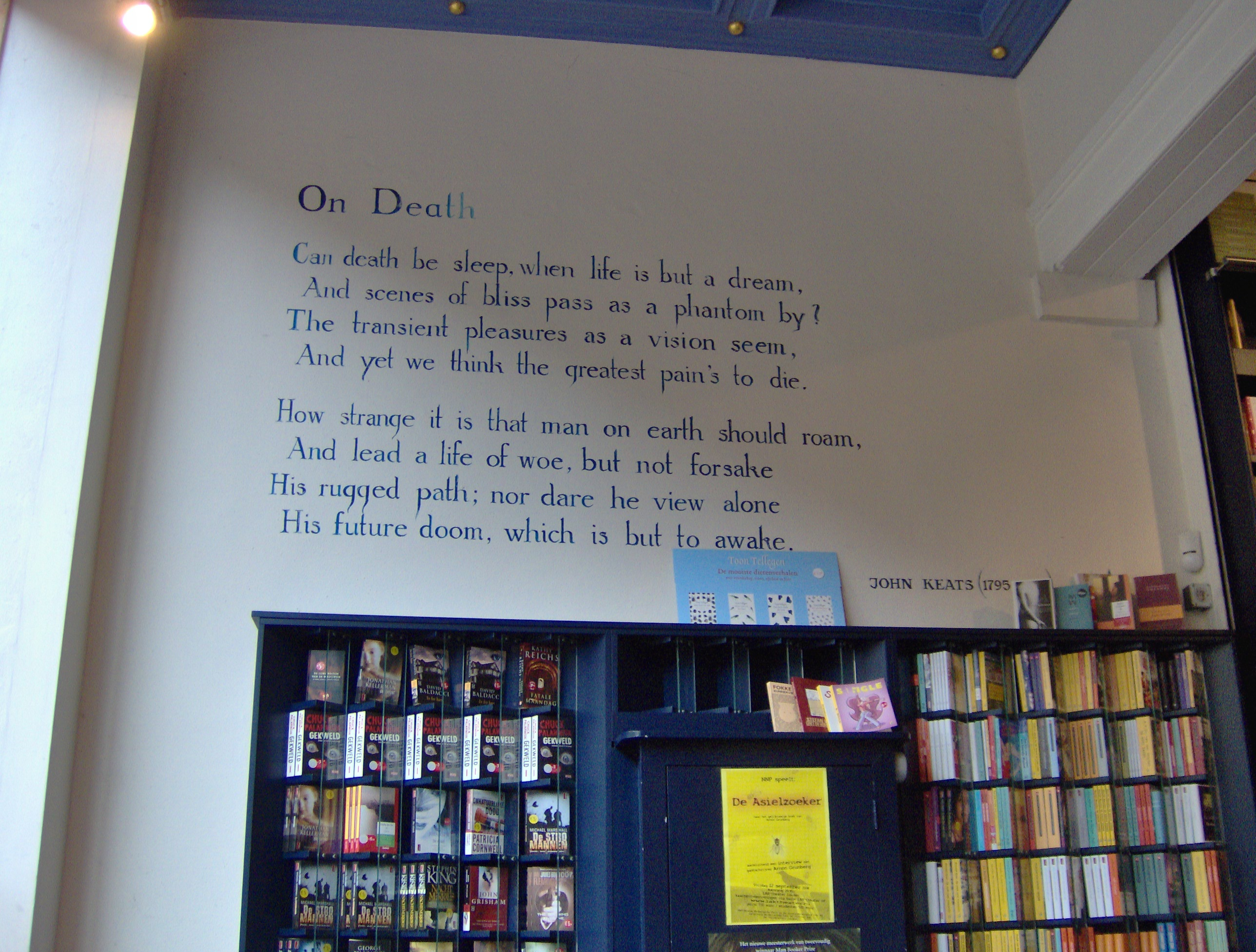
The poem On death on a wall at Breestraat 113 in Leiden, Netherlands.

Keats's letters were first published in 1848 and 1878. Critics in the 19th century disregarded them as distractions from his poetic works, but in the 20th century they became almost as admired and studied as his poetry, and are highly regarded in the canon of English literary correspondence. T. S. Eliot called them "certainly the most notable and most important ever written by any English poet."

Keats spent much time considering poetry itself, its constructs and impacts, displaying a deep interest unusual in his milieu, who were more easily distracted by metaphysics or politics, fashions or science. Eliot wrote of Keats's conclusions: "There is hardly one statement of Keats' about poetry which ... will not be found to be true, and what is more, true for greater and more mature poetry than anything Keats ever wrote."

Few of Keats's letters remain from the period before he joined his literary circle. From spring 1817, however, there is a record of his letter-writing skills. He and his friends, poets, critics, novelists, and editors wrote to each other daily, and Keats's ideas are in the ordinary, his day-to-day missives sharing news, parody and social commentary. They contain humour and critical intelligence. Born of an "unself-conscious stream of consciousness," they are impulsive, aware of his own nature and his shortcomings.

When his brother George went to America, Keats wrote to him in detail, the body of letters becoming "the real diary" and self-revelation of Keats's life, as well as an exposition of his philosophy, with the first drafts of poems containing some of Keats's finest writing and thought. Gittings sees them as akin to a "spiritual journal" not written for a specific other, so much as for synthesis.

Keats also reflected on the background and composition of his poetry. Specific letters often coincide with or anticipate the poems they describe. In February to May 1819 he produced many of his finest letters. Writing to his brother George, Keats explored the idea of the world as "the vale of Soul-making", anticipating the great odes he wrote some months later. In the letters Keats coined ideas such as the Mansion of Many Apartments and the Chameleon Poet, which came to gain common currency and capture the public imagination, though only making single appearances as phrases in his correspondence. The poetical mind, Keats argued:

has no self – it is every thing and nothing – It has no character – it enjoys light and shade; ... What shocks the virtuous philosopher, delights the camelion [chameleon] Poet. It does no harm from its relish of the dark side of things any more than from its taste for the bright one; because they both end in speculation. A Poet is the most unpoetical of any thing in existence; because he has no Identity – he is continually in for – and filling some other Body – The Sun, the Moon, the Sea and Men and Women who are creatures of impulse are poetical and have about them an unchangeable attribute – the poet has none; no identity – he is certainly the most unpoetical of all God's Creatures.

He used the term negative capability to discuss the state of being in which we are "capable of being in uncertainties, Mysteries, doubts without any irritable reaching after fact & reason ... [Being] content with half knowledge" where one trusts in the heart's perceptions. He wrote later he was "certain of nothing but the holiness of the Heart's affections and the truth of Imagination – What the imagination seizes as Beauty must be truth – whether it existed before or not – for I have the same Idea of all our Passions as of Love they are all in their sublime, creative of essential Beauty" constantly returning to what it means to be a poet. "My Imagination is a Monastery and I am its Monk", Keats notes to Shelley.

In September 1819, Keats wrote to Reynolds "How beautiful the season is now – How fine the air. A temperate sharpness about it.... I never lik'd the stubbled fields as much as now – Aye, better than the chilly green of spring. Somehow the stubble plain looks warm – in the same way as some pictures look warm – this struck me so much in my Sunday's walk that I composed upon it". The final stanza of his last great ode, "To Autumn", runs:

Where are the songs of Spring? Ay, where are they?
Think not of them, thou hast thy music too, –
While barred clouds bloom the soft-dying day,
And touch the stubble-plains with rosy hue;

"To Autumn" was to become one of the most highly regarded poems in the English language. (Note: Bate p. 581: "Each generation has found it one of the most nearly perfect poems in English.") (Note: The 1888 Encyclopædia Britannica declared that, "Of these [odes] perhaps the two nearest to absolute perfection, to the triumphant achievement and accomplishment of the very utmost beauty possible to human words, may be that of to Autumn and that on a Grecian Urn" Thomas Baynes, ed. Encyclopædia Britannica Vol. XIV. Cambridge: Cambridge University Press, 1888. OCLC 1387837, p. 23.)

There are areas of his life and daily routine that Keats omits. He mentions little of his childhood or his financial straits, being seemingly embarrassed to discuss them. There is no reference to his parents. In his last year, as his health deteriorated, his concerns often give way to despair and morbid obsessions. His letters to Fanny Brawne, published in 1870, focus on the period and emphasise its tragic aspect, giving rise to widespread criticism at the time.

== Major works ==
- Miriam Allott, ed., The Complete Poems (London and New York: Longman, 1970)
- John Barnard (Professor of English Literature, University of Leeds), ed., Christopher Ricks (General editor of Penguin English Poets), John Keats, The Complete Poems, Penguin Classics, Penguin Books, London, First Pub. 1973, Second edition 1977, Third edition 1988, Reprinted 2003, Reprinted with minor corrections 2006, 754 pages. ISBN 978-0-14-042210-8.
- Cox, Jeffrey N., ed. (2008). Keats's Poetry and Prose. New York and London: W. W. Norton & Co. ISBN 978-0393924916.
- H. Buxton Forman, ed., The Complete Poetical Works of John Keats (Oxford: Oxford UP, 1907)
- Hyder Edward Rollins, ed., The Letters of John Keats 1814–1821, 2 vols. (Cambridge: Harvard UP, 1958)
- Grant F. Scott, ed., Selected Letters of John Keats (Cambridge: Harvard UP, 2002)
- Horace E. Scudder, ed., The Complete Poetical Works and Letters of John Keats (Boston: Riverside Press, 1899)
- Jack Stillinger, ed., John Keats: Poetry Manuscripts at Harvard, a Facsimile Edition (Cambridge: Harvard UP, 1990) ISBN 0-674-47775-8
- Jack Stillinger, ed., The Poems of John Keats (Cambridge: Harvard UP, 1978)
- Susan Wolfson, ed., John Keats (London and New York: Longman, 2007)

== Sources ==
- Bate, Walter Jackson (1964). John Keats. Cambridge, Mass.: Harvard University Press.
- Bate, Walter Jackson (2009). John Keats. Cambridge, Mass.: Harvard University Press.
- Bate, Walter Jackson (2012). Negative Capability: The Intuitive Approach in Keats (1965), reprinted with a new intro by Maura Del Serra. New York: Contra Mundum Press, 2012.
- Brown, Charles Armitage (1937). The Life of John Keats, ed. London: Oxford University Press.
- Brown, Sue (2009). Joseph Severn, A Life: The Rewards of Friendship. Oxford University Press ISBN 978-0-19-956502-3
- Chapman, D. (2012). What's in an Urn?, Concept, ISBN 978-1291143119
- Colvin, Sidney (1917). John Keats: His Life and Poetry, His Friends Critics and After-Fame. London: Macmillan
- Colvin, Sidney (1970). John Keats: His Life and Poetry, His Friends, Critics, and After-Fame. New York: Octagon Books
- Coote, Stephen (1995). John Keats. A Life. London: Hodder & Stoughton
- De Almeida, Hermione (1991). Romantic Medicine and John Keats. New York: Oxford University Press. ISBN 0-19-506307-4
- Gittings, Robert (1954). John Keats: The Living Year. 21 September 1818 to 21 September 1819. London: Heinemann.
- Gittings, Robert (1964). The Keats Inheritance. London: Heinemann
- Gittings, Robert (1968). John Keats. London: Heinemann
- Gittings, Robert (1987) Selected poems and letters of Keats London: Heinemann
- Goslee, Nancy (1985). Uriel's Eye: Miltonic Stationing and Statuary in Blake, Keats and Shelley. University of Alabama Press ISBN 0-8173-0243-3
- Hewlett, Dorothy (3rd rev. ed. 1970). A life of John Keats. London: Hutchinson.
- Hirsch, Edward (Ed.) (2001). Complete Poems and Selected Letters of John Keats. Random House Publishing. ISBN 0-375-75669-8
- Houghton, Richard (Ed.) (2008). The Life and Letters of John Keats. Read Books ISBN 978-1-4097-9103-4
- Jones, Michael (1984). "Twilight of the Gods: The Greeks in Schiller and Lukacs". Germanic Review. 59 (2): 49–56. doi:10.1080/00168890.1984.9935401.
- Lachman, Lilach (1988). "History and Temporalization of Space: Keats' Hyperion Poems". Proceedings of the XII Congress of the International Comparative Literature Association, edited by Roger Bauer and Douwe Fokkema (Munich, Germany): 159–164
- G. M. Matthews (Ed). (1995). "John Keats: The Critical Heritage". London: Routledge ISBN 0-415-13447-1
- Monckton Milnes, Richard, ed. (Lord Houghton) (1848). Life, Letters and Literary Remains of John Keats. 2 vols. London: Edward Moxon
- Motion, Andrew (1997). Keats. London: Faber
- O'Neill, Michael & Mahoney Charles (Eds.) (2007). Romantic Poetry: An Annotated Anthology. Blackwell ISBN 0-631-21317-1
- Ridley, M. and R. Clarendon (1933). Keats' craftsmanship: a study in poetic development ASIN B00085UM2I (Out of Print in 2010)
- Scott, Grant F. (1994). The Sculpted Word: Keats, Ekphrasis, and the Visual Arts. Hanover, NH: University Press of New England. ISBN 0-87451-679-X
- Stillinger, Jack (1982). Complete Poems. Cambridge, Massachusetts: Belknap Press of Harvard University Press ISBN 0-674-15430-4
- Strachan, John (Ed.) (2003). A Routledge Literary Sourcebook on the Poems of John Keats. New York: Routledge ISBN 0-415-23478-6
- Vendler, Helen (1983). The Odes of John Keats. Belknap Press ISBN 0-674-63076-9
- Walsh, John Evangelist (1999). Darkling I Listen: The Last Days and Death of John Keats. New York: St. Martin's Press
- Walsh, William (1957). "John Keats", in From Blake to Byron. Middlesex: Penguin
- Ward, Aileen (1963). John Keats: The Making of a Poet. London: Secker & Warburg
- Wolfson, Susan J. (1986). The Questioning Presence. Ithaca, New York: Cornell University Press ISBN 0-8014-1909-3
