= Sherlock James Andrews =

American politician and lawyer

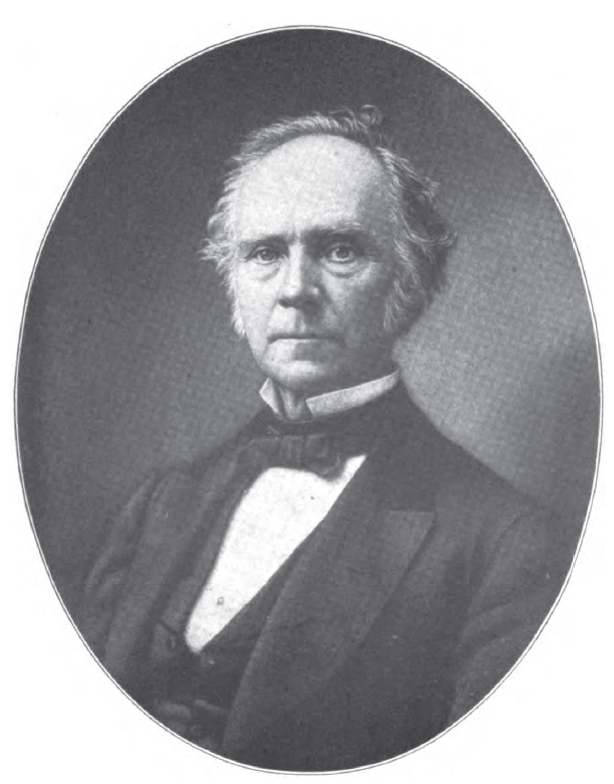

Member of the U.S. House of Representatives from Ohio's 15th district
- In office March 4, 1841 – March 3, 1843
- Preceded by: John William Allen
- Succeeded by: Joseph Morris

Personal details
- Born: November 17, 1801 Wallingford, Connecticut, U.S.
- Died: February 11, 1880 (aged 78) Cleveland, Ohio, U.S.
- Party: Whig; Republican
- Spouse: Ursula McCurdy
- Children: five
- Education: Union College; Yale Law School
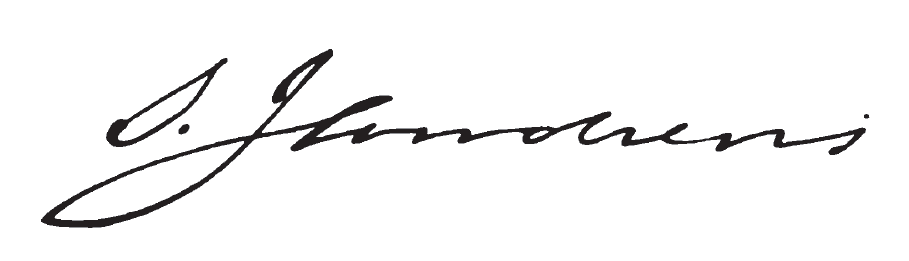
- Signature

Sherlock James Andrews (November 17, 1801 – February 11, 1880), was an American lawyer and abolitionist Congressman from Ohio. He became the 1st President of the Cleveland Bar Association and was one of the lawyers who defended the abolitionists in the Oberlin–Wellington Rescue Case with John Mercer Langston.

He was also among the leaders of the Cleveland Anti-Slavery Society, and cofounded with Congressman Joshua Giddings the Select Committee on Slavery, wishing the end of slavery through legislation.

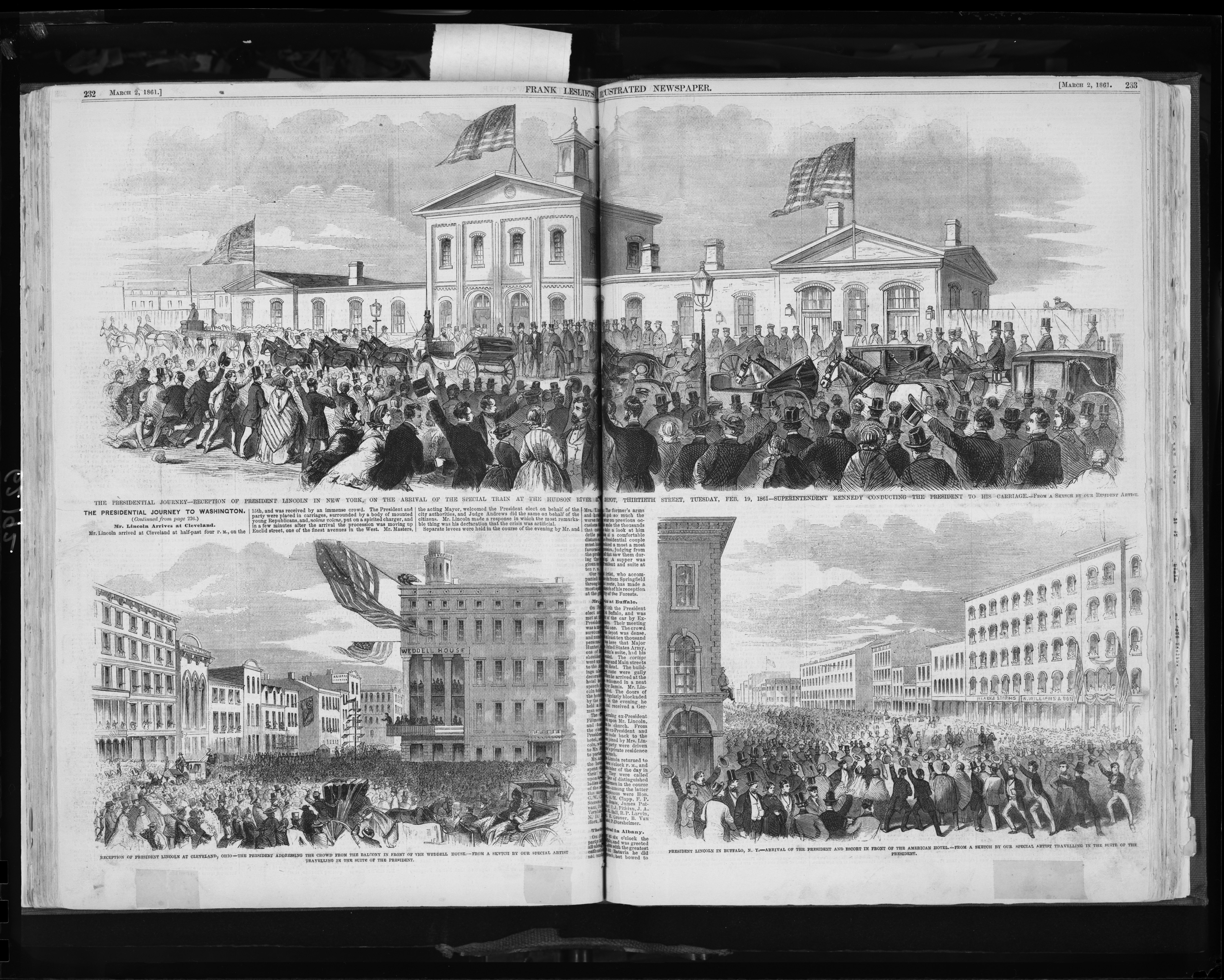
Presidential Journey of Abraham Lincoln to Cleveland, Judge Andrews received him at the Weddell House Hotel at the bottom left

== Early life ==
He was born in Wallingford, Connecticut, to Dr. John Andrews and Abigail Atwater, granddaughter of Sarah Yale and Capt. Joshua Atwater. Sarah Yale was the daughter of Capt. Theophilus Yale, and they were members of the Yale family who gave their name to Yale College.

He graduated from Union College, Schenectady, New York, in 1821 and studied law at Yale. After graduation, he became assistant and personal secretary to Chemist professor Benjamin Silliman of Yale, also founder of the American Journal of Science.

He married Ursula McCurdy Allen on December 1, 1828, and settled in Cleveland, Ohio. In 1829, he helped found Trinity Church, the first church built in Cleveland at the time. He was an intricate part of the early development of Cleveland as the first president of the city council and the public library board. He advocated for and promoted the building of the Cleveland & Pittsburgh Railway.

== Career ==
In 1840 he was elected to the Twenty-seventh Congress on the Whig platform. In 1842 health issues compelled him not to seek nomination for a second term. He was appointed Judge of the superior court of Cleveland which he served from 1848 to 1850. He founded the Select Committee on Slavery while in Congress, wishing to see the end of slavery through legislation, and paid for a number of speeches done by abolitionist orator Theodore Dwight Weld.

In the 1840s, he became one of the first bank presidents of the Cleveland Society for Savings, later the Key Bank. He lost election in 1851 to the Ohio Supreme Court.

He was a delegate in the Ohio constitutional convention from 1850 to 1851. In 1856, the Republican Party was founded, and Judge Andrews left the Whigs to become a Republican at the same time as Abraham Lincoln. When Lincoln was elected, he made a trip to Cleveland on his way to Washington, where Judge Andrews received him and made the address to the crowd.

In 1859 at Wellington, Ohio, he was one of the attorneys defending the abolitionist men who rescued John Price from "slave catchers". His political career ended serving as a delegate on the constitutional convention of 1873.

He was United States Attorney for the Northern District of Ohio in 1867 after the American Civil War, which had made Cleveland a heavy manufacturing center, ranging from railroad supplies to gun carriages, gun powder and ship building.

In 1873, with the growth of Cleveland, a better legal system was needed. With 53 lawyers, Judge Andrews formed the Cleveland Bar Association and was elected its first president. At their first meeting, they proposed a resolution to have Judge Charles T. Sherman, the brother of General Sherman, to resign on the basis of ethical grounds. He later resigned and Judge Andrews stayed president of the bar for 7 years before his death.

== Personal life ==
Sherlock James Andrews died on February 11, 1880.

He was married to Ursula McCurdy Allen, daughter of Congressman John Allen, and had 5 children. Her brother was Congressman John W. Allen, and her cousins were Lt. Gov. Charles J. McCurdy and banker Richard Aldrich McCurdy, a business partner of Cornelius Vanderbilt and William Rockefeller, and uncle-in-law of Alexander Graham Bell.

Through her great-grandmother Ursula Wolcott Griswold, sister of Gov. Roger Griswold, she was a relative of the Griswold family and a cousin of Founding Father Oliver Wolcott and U.S. Treasury Secretary Oliver Wolcott Jr. who replaced Alexander Hamilton. Other family members included Senator James Lanman, a cousin of Presidents John Adams and John Quincy Adams, Senator Lafayette S. Foster, and Chief Justice Ebenezer Lane.

Judge Andrews's daughter, Ursula McCurdy Andrews, married businessman Gamaliel E. Herrick, President of Cleveland Oil, and brother of Col. and Senator John F. Herrick. Her sister-in-law was suffragist Mary Barr Clay, daughter of Maj. Gen. Cassius M. Clay, Ambassador to Russia, and abolitionist Mary Jane Warfield Clay, members of the Clay family. Gamaliel was also a cousin of Gov. Myron T. Herrick, U.S. Ambassador to France.

Judge Andrews's son, William Whiting Andrews, married the daughter of banker Nelson Beardsley, law partner of abolitionist Secretary of State William H. Seward, who served under Abraham Lincoln. Beardsley, who left a fortune of 7 million dollars in 1894, was the son of Senator John Beardsley, and grandson of Senator James Powers.

Juge Andrews's granddaughter married to Maj. Chapman, brother of Mary Berri Chapman Hansbrough, and brother-in-law of Senator Henry C. Hansbrough, and his grandson, Frank Rufus Herrick, married the daughter of Congressman Theodore Medad Pomeroy, family member of the Secretary of State John Foster Dulles, brother of CIA Director Allen Dulles. Their daughter was artist Josephine Herrick who worked on the Manhattan Project and was in partnership in a New York studio with Princess Miguel de Braganza.

== Sources ==
- "Andrews, Sherlock James." Dictionary of American Biography. Vol. 1, Charles Scribner's Sons. 1928.
- Wilson, J. G.; Fiske, J., eds. (1900). "Andrews, Sherlock James" . Appletons' Cyclopædia of American Biography. New York: D. Appleton.
- United States Congress. "Sherlock James Andrews (id: A000249)". Biographical Directory of the United States Congress.

U.S. House of Representatives
Preceded by John W. Allen	United States Representative from Ohio's 15th congressional district 1841–1843	Succeeded by Joseph Morris
