= Mary Clay =

Mary Clay may refer to:

- Mary Barr Clay (1839–1924), leader of the American women's suffrage movement
- Mary Jane Warfield Clay (1815–1900), leader in the suffrage movement in Kentucky
