= Henry Clay (disambiguation) =

Henry Clay (1777–1852) was an American politician from Kentucky.

Henry Clay may also refer to:

- Henry Clay (papier-mâché maker) (fl. 1740–; died 1812), English inventor who patented a laminate sheet process for making papier-mâché
- Henry Clay Jr. (1811–1847), his son, American soldier and statesman
- Henry Clay (1851 steamboat), subject of the Hudson River's worst steamboat disaster, in Riverdale, the Bronx, New York, on July 28, 1852
- Henry Clay (1849 steamboat), shipwrecked in the Great Lakes in 1851
- Henry Clay High School, oldest public high school in Lexington, Kentucky
- USS Henry Clay, a Lafayette-class ballistic missile submarine
- Henry Clay (cigar), a brand of cigars
- Henry Clay (Niehaus), a 1929 bronze sculpture
- Henry Clay (economist) (1883–1954), British economist and Warden of Nuffield College, Oxford
- Henry Robinson Clay (1895–1919), World War I flying ace
- Sir Henry Clay, 6th Baronet (1909–1985), English engineer
- Henry Clay (rower) (born 1955), British Olympic rower
- Henry Clay, Kentucky
- Henry Clay Township, Fayette County, Pennsylvania, township in Fayette County, Pennsylvania
- Henry Clay, Delaware, an unincorporated community in New Castle County, Delaware, United States

== See also ==
- Harry Clay (disambiguation)
- Clay family
