= Brutus Clay =

Brutus Clay may refer to:

- Brutus J. Clay (1808–1878), U.S. Representative from Kentucky
- Brutus J. Clay II (1847–1932), his nephew, American businessman, political figure and diplomat
