= List of shipwrecks in July 1852 =

The list of shipwrecks in July 1852 includes ships sunk, foundered, wrecked, grounded, or otherwise lost during July 1852.

== 1 July ==
List of shipwrecks: 1 July 1852
Ship	State	Description
Bee	United Kingdom	The sloop was driven ashore and wrecked on the Yellow Breast Rocks, in Tunnard Bay, Wigtownshire. Her crew were rescued. She was on a voyage from Stranraer, Wigtownshire to Saltcoats, Ayrshire.
Duchess of Kent	United Kingdom	The paddle steamer collided with the paddle steamer Ravensbourne and sank in the River Thames at Northfleet, Kent and sank with the loss of two lives. About 100 survivors were rescued by the steamship Meteor (United Kingdom), by Ravensbourne and by a wherry. Duchess of Kent was on a voyage from Ramsgate, Kent to London. An attempt to refloat her on 24 July was unsuccessful.
Eliza	Hamburg	The ship was driven ashore at Cabrita Point, Spain. She was on a voyage from Licata, Sicily to Hamburg.
Gabrielle	France	The ship was driven ashore at Gibraltar. She was on a voyage from Toulon, Var to Morlaix, Finistère.
Glammis Castle	United Kingdom	The barque was in collision with Tropic (United States) at 9°N 35°W in the Atlantic Ocean. She was abandoned the next day.
Neyreyden	Norway	The ship sprang a leak. She was on a voyage from St. Ubes, Portugal to Christiansand. She put in to "Hvidingsoe", where she ran aground.
Orynthia	United Kingdom	The ship was driven ashore at Roden Point, Spain. She was on a voyage from Alexandria, Egypt to Liverpool, Lancashire. She was refloated with assistance from HMS Growler (Royal Navy) and taken in to Gibraltar.
St. Anna	Kingdom of the Two Sicilies	The brigantine was driven ashore at Gibraltar.
Vlyt	Netherlands	The ship was wrecked on Ameland, Friesland. Her crew were rescued. She was on a voyage from Groningen to London.

== 2 July ==
List of shipwrecks: 2 July 1852
Ship	State	Description
Matthew van Brec	Belgium	The barque was wrecked on the Florida Reef. She was on a voyage from Matanzas, Cuba to Antwerp.
Mercurius	Kingdom of Hanover	The galiot sank off the Maplin Sand, in the North Sea off the coast of Essex, United Kingdom. Her crew were rescued. She was on a voyage from Amsterdam, North Holland, Netherlands to London, United Kingdom. She was refloated on 22 July and taken in to Sheerness, Kent, United Kingdom.

== 3 July ==
List of shipwrecks: 3 July 1852
Ship	State	Description
Daniel Dyer	United Kingdom	The ship ran aground and was severely damaged at Bridgwater, Somerset.
Home	United States	The barque was wrecked in Humboldt Bay.
Rising Sun	United Kingdom	The paddle tug was holed by an anchor and sank at South Shields, County Durham.

== 4 July ==
List of shipwrecks: July 1852
Ship	State	Description
Ashley	United Kingdom	The schooner ran aground on the Platters. She was on a voyage from Barrow-in-Furness, Lancashire to Cardiff, Glamorgan. She was refloated and taken in to Holyhead, Anglesey.
Indus	United Kingdom	The steamship was severely damaged by fire at Blackwall, Middlesex.
Nelson	United Kingdom	The ship was severely damaged by fire at Blackwall.
Sussex	United Kingdom	The ship capsized in the Pacific Ocean during a typhoon. Her crew were rescued. She was on a voyage from San Francisco, California, United States to Hong Kong.
Victoria	United Kingdom	The ship was driven ashore near Fjends, Denmark. She was on a voyage from Newport, Monmouthshire to Danzig.

== 5 July ==
List of shipwrecks: 5 July 1852
Ship	State	Description
St. James	United States	The steamboat suffered a boiler explosion near New Orleans, Louisiana with the loss of about 40 lives.

== 6 July ==
List of shipwrecks: July 1852
Ship	State	Description
Ann Louise	France	The ship ran aground in the Hooghly River. She was refloated and put in to Calcutta, India. She was consequently condemned.
Osceola	United Kingdom	The ship was wrecked on Babuyan Island, Spanish East Indies. Six crew were rescued at sea by the steamship Semiramis ( India), which subsequently rescued the remainder of the crew from Babuyan Island. Osceola was on a voyage from San Francisco, California to Hong Kong.
Rhine	United Kingdom	The brig foundered in the Atlantic Ocean. Her crew were rescued by the brig Gemma ( Kingdom of Sardinia). Rhine was on a voyage from Pernambuco, Brazil to Genoa, Kingdom of Sardinia.
Vivid	United Kingdom	The ship ran aground on the Holm Sand, in the North Sea off the coast of Suffolk. She was on a voyage from Newhaven, Sussex to Sunderland, County Durham. She was refloated and resumed her voyage.

== 7 July ==
List of shipwrecks: 7 July 1852
Ship	State	Description
Amanda	United Kingdom	The ship ran aground on the Nore. She was on a voyage from London to Liverpool, Lancashire. She was refloated and resumed her voyage.
Nuova Silfide	Austrian Empire	The barque was driven ashore and wrecked at Hendon, County Durham, United Kingdom. She was on a voyage from Antwerp, Belgium to Newcastle upon Tyne, Northumberland, United Kingdom. She was refloated on 16 July.

== 8 July ==
List of shipwrecks: 8 July 1852
Ship	State	Description
Malta	United Kingdom	The brig ran aground on the Holm Sand, in the North Sea off the coast of Suffolk. She was on a voyage from South Shields, County Durham to London. She was refloated with assistance from a yawl and resumed her voyage.
McLellan	United States	The whaler, a full-rigged ship, was lost in the Davis Strait.

== 9 July ==
List of shipwrecks: 9 July 1852
Ship	State	Description
Alexandre Barclay	Bremen	The whaler capsized at Bremen.
John Woodall	United Kingdom	The barque was driven ashore and wrecked in a hurricane at Ship Harbour, Leones Island, off the coast of Patagonia, Argentina.
Kate	United Kingdom	The ship ran aground at New York, United States. She was on a voyage from New York to Liverpool, Lancashire. She was refloated on 11 July.
Zephyr	United Kingdom	The ship was wrecked on the Snake Island Spit, at the mouth of the Niger River. Her crew were rescued.

== 10 July ==
List of shipwrecks: 10 July 1852
Ship	State	Description
Bolivar	United Kingdom	The ship ran aground and sank off Santa Anna Island. She was on a voyage from Cardiff, Glamorgan to Maranhão, Brazil.
Virginie	France	The ship was abandoned and sank. Her crew were rescued by Mary Ann Atkinson (United Kingdom). Virginie was on a voyage from Rouen, Seine-Inférieure to Bordeaux, Gironde.
Warren	United States	The whaler was in the Gulf of Anadyr when she caught fire, burned to the water line, and exploded. The ship California retrieved her crew.

== 12 July ==
List of shipwrecks: 12 July 1852
Ship	State	Description
City of Oswego	United States	The steamboat collided with another steamboat and sank near Cleveland, Ohio with the loss of 20 lives.

== 13 July ==
List of shipwrecks: 13 July 1852
Ship	State	Description
Ganom	United Kingdom	The ship was driven ashore at West Quoddy, Nova Scotia, British North America. She was on a voyage from Saint John, New Brunswick, British North America to Liverpool, Lancashire. She was refloated and taken in to Eastport, Maine, United States in a waterlogged condition.

== 14 July ==
List of shipwrecks: 14 July 1852
Ship	State	Description
Esker	United Kingdom	The brig was driven ashore and wrecked near Musquash, New Brunswick, British North America.
Helen	(United Kingdom of Great Britain and Ireland) Van Diemen's Land	The brig was wrecked at Prossers Bay.
Hoop	Duchy of Holstein	The ship foundered off Borkum, Kingdom of Hanover. Her crew were rescued. She was on a voyage from Husum to Hartlepool, County Durham, United Kingdom.
Hungarian	United Kingdom	The ship was driven ashore on Grand Manan Island, New Brunswick. She was on a voyage from Saint John, New Brunswick to Liverpool, Lancashire. She was later refloated and towed in to Portland, Maine, United States.
Huntingdon	United Kingdom	The ship ran aground at Woosung, China.
Isabella Muston	United Kingdom	The ship departed from Malta for Queenstown, County Cork. She was subsequently abandoned at sea.
Lydia Jane	United Kingdom	The ship ran aground on Nickman's Ground, in the Baltic Sea. She was on a voyage from sunderland, County Durham to Saint Petersburg, Russia. She was refloated and put in to "Baltic Port".

== 15 July ==
List of shipwrecks: 15 July 1852
Ship	State	Description
Eos	United Kingdom	The ship was driven ashore at North Foreland, Kent. She was on a voyage from Ceylon to London. She was refloated with assistance from the steamship Father Thames (United Kingdom) and resumed her voyage.

== 16 July ==
List of shipwrecks: 16 July 1852
Ship	State	Description
Cullona	United Kingdom	The ship ran aground on South Ronaldsay, Orkney Islands. She was on a voyage from Newcastle upon Tyne, Northumberland to New York, United States. She was refloated and resumed her voyage.
Hebe	United Kingdom	The brig was wrecked at Fort, Colombo, Ceylon with the loss of a crew member.
Sophie	Kingdom of Hanover	The ship sprang a leak and sank off Gamle Hellesund, Norway. Her crew were rescued. She was on a voyage from Elbing to Leith, Lothian, United Kingdom.

== 17 July ==
List of shipwrecks: 17 July 1852
Ship	State	Description
HMS Buzzard	Royal Navy	The Buzzard-class sloop ran aground on the Point Pleasant Shoal, off Halifax, Nova Scotia, British North America and was damaged. She was refloated and taken in to Saint John's, Newfoundland, British North America.

== 18 July ==
List of shipwrecks: 18 July 1852
Ship	State	Description
Amelia	United Kingdom	The ship capsized and sank in a squall off "Tonjong Sirik" with the loss of 69 of the 81 people on board. She was on a voyage from Singapore to Brunei and Labuan, Malaya.
Providence	United Kingdom	The sloop struck the Runnel Stone and sank. Her crew were rescued. She was on a voyage from Teignmouth, Devon to Porthcawl, Glamorgan.

== 19 July ==
List of shipwrecks: 19 July 1852
Ship	State	Description
Johan Jacob	Netherlands	The ship was wrecked on a reef west of Prinsen Island, Netherlands East Indies with the loss of nine of the 25 people on board. Survivors were rescued on 25 July by HNLMS Merati (Royal Netherlands Navy). Johan Jacob was on a voyage from Batavia, Netherlands East Indies to Rotterdam, South Holland.

== 20 July ==
List of shipwrecks: 20 July 1852
Ship	State	Description
Chippewa	United Kingdom	The ship was wrecked on the Tukan Bessie Reefs, off "Butan Island", Netherlands East Indies. Her crew were rescued. She was on a voyage from China to Bombay, India.
Olda	France	The ship ran aground on the Haisborough Sands, in the North Sea off the coast of Norfolk, United Kingdom and was abandoned. She was on a voyage from Newcastle upon Tyne, Northumberland, United Kingdom to Toulon, Var, France.

== 21 July ==
List of shipwrecks: 21 July 1852
Ship	State	Description
Achilles	United Kingdom	The ship was driven ashore at Machias, Maine, United States. She was on a voyage from South Shields, County Durham to Saint John, New Brunswick, British North America.
Argo	United Kingdom	The ship was wrecked near Machias, Maine. She was on a voyage from New York, United States to Saint John, New Brunswick.
Camoena	United Kingdom	The ship was wrecked on Hap Island, off the coast of Patagonia, Argentina.
John White	United Kingdom	The ship was damaged by fire off "Mohilla Island". She was on a voyage from Hull, Yorkshire to Calcutta, India.
Maria and Ellen	United Kingdom	The ship ran aground on the Vogelsand, in the North Sea. She was on a voyage from Caernarfon to Cuxhaven. She was refloated and completed her voyage.

== 22 July ==
List of shipwrecks: 22 July 1852
Ship	State	Description
Ceres	Flag unknown	The ship was wrecked on a reef in the Fiji Islands. Her crew were rescued. She was on a voyage from San Francisco, California, United States to Sydney, New South Wales.
Prentice	United Kingdom	The full-rigged ship was destroyed by fire at Charleston, South Carolina, United States. She was on a voyage from Charleston to Havre de Grâce, Seine-Inférieure, France.

== 23 July ==
List of shipwrecks: 23 July 1852
Ship	State	Description
Flora	United Kingdom	The ship was driven ashore at Hawkins Point, Baltimore, Maryland, United States. She was on a voyage from Liverpool, Lancashire to Baltimore.

== 24 July ==
List of shipwrecks: 24 July 1852
Ship	State	Description
Charlotte	(United Kingdom of Great Britain and Ireland) British North America	The barque ran aground on the Grecian Shoal, off the coast of Florida, United States. She was later refloated and taken in to Charleston, South Carolina, United States.
Edinburgh Packet	United Kingdom	The ship was driven ashore and wrecked at "Cubo Cander", Spain. Her crew were rescued. She was on a voyage from Newcastle upon Tyne, Northumberland to Cádiz, Spain.
Orange Branch	United Kingdom	The ship struck a sunken wreck and foundered in the Bristol Channel 14 nautical miles (26 km) off Lundy Island, Devon. Her crew were rescued.
Renown	United Kingdom	The schooner ran aground on the Nore. She was on a voyage from Alloa, Clackmannanshire to London. She sank the next day. Renown was subsequently plundered by wreckers from Southend, Essex. HMS Africaine (Royal Navy) was sent with a party of Royal Marines to her position to deter the wreckers. After she had departed, they returned so HMS Wildfire (Royal Navy) was sent out similarly equipped with orders to remain on station.

== 26 July ==
List of shipwrecks: 27 July 1852
Ship	State	Description
Newton	United Kingdom	The schooner struck rocks at Lindisfarne, Northumberland and sank.
Sophie	Stettin	The ship sprang a leak and was beached on Skagen, Denmark. She was on a voyage from Grangemouth, Stirlingshire, United Kingdom to Stettin.

== 27 July ==
List of shipwrecks: 27 July 1852
Ship	State	Description
Fife Maid	United Kingdom	The schooner was in collision with another vessel and was abandoned. Her crew were rescued. She was subsequently driven ashore and wrecked at Craster, Caithness.
Prince	(United Kingdom of Great Britain and Ireland) British North America	The schooner was wrecked near St. Mary's, Nova Scotia. She was on a voyage from Cádiz, Spain to New York, United States.
Sedulous	United Kingdom	The ship was driven ashore at Peterhead, Aberdeenshire. Her crew were rescued. She was on a voyage from Quebec City, Province of Canada, British North America to Peterhead. She was refloated on 30 July and taken in to Peterhead in a severely damaged condition.
Voyageur	France	The ship sprang a leak and sank off "Literi Island". Her crew were rescued. She was on a voyage from Swansea, Glamorgan, United Kingdom to Plouescat, Finistère.

== 28 July ==
List of shipwrecks: 28 July 1852
Ship	State	Description
Breeze	United Kingdom	The schooner ran aground on Knox's Rock, in the Farne Islands, Northumberland.
HMS Dido	Royal Navy	The Daphne-class corvette ran aground off Tahiti and was damaged. She was ordered back to England for repairs.
Hector	United Kingdom	The East Indiaman, a barque, sprang a leak and was beached on the coast of Natal with the loss of six of her sixteen crew. She was on a voyage from Batavia, Netherlands East Indies to London.
Henry Clay	United States	The steamboat caught fire in the Hudson River and was beached at Yonkers, New York. She burnt out with the loss of about 80 lives.

== 30 July ==
List of shipwrecks: 30 July 1852
Ship	State	Description
Glasgow Citizen	United Kingdom	The paddle steamer collided with Princess Alice (United Kingdom) in the Clyde at Govan, Renfrewshire with the loss of two lives. Her passengers were taken off by Invincible. Glasgow Citizen was taken to Barclay Curle's yard in a sinking condition.
Mary	(United Kingdom of Great Britain and Ireland) New South Wales	The brig was driven ashore in the Kent Group, Van Diemen's Land.
Zephyr	(United Kingdom of Great Britain and Ireland) New South Wales	The ship was wrecked at Bream Creek, Van Diemen's Land with the loss of seven of her crew.

== 31 July ==
List of shipwrecks: 31 July 1852
Ship	State	Description
Charlotte	United Kingdom	The ship was destroyed by fire in the South West Passage. Her crew were rescued. She was on a voyage from New Orleans, Louisiana, United States to Liverpool, Lancashire.
Syskonen	(Russian Empire) Grand Duchy of Finland	The ship was driven ashore on the coast of Sweden. She was on a voyage from Liverpool, Lancashire, United Kingdom to Vaasa. She was refloated on 2 August and towed in to Copenhagen, Denmark.

== Unknown date ==
List of shipwrecks: Unknown date in July 1852
Ship	State	Description
Alliance	United Kingdom	The fishery protection schooner foundered off St. Paul Island, Nova Scotia, British North America before 14 July with the loss of all hands.
America	United States	The yacht ran aground and was damaged at Portsmouth, Hampshire, United Kingdom.
Antonia	Spain	The schooner was wrecked at "Hallooloo", Africa. Her ten crew survived.
Coralie	France	The ship was wrecked "in the North Bank, at Teste".
Craigie	United Kingdom	The brig was destroyed by fire at Scrabster, Caithness between 22 and 28 July.
George W. Horton	United Kingdom	The full-rigged ship ran aground on the Middle Ground, in the Bahamas. She was refloated and resumed her voyage.
Margarita	Chile	The brig was lost at "Coloura" before 14 July. Her crew were rescued.
Oxford	United States	The barque was wrecked 40 nautical miles (74 km) north of San Francisco, California before 14 July.
Peggy	United Kingdom	The ship ran aground on the Leigh Middle Sand, in the Thames Estuary. She was refloated with the assistance of twenty yawls.
Portuguese	Chile	The barque was lost at "Coloura" before 14 July. Her crew were rescued.
Rumena	Chile	The barque was lost at Pichidangui before 14 July. Her crew were rescued.
Union	Spain	The barque was driven ashore at Aparri, Spanish East Indies. She was on a voyage from Macao, China to San Francisco, California, United States.
Zanoni	United Kingdom	The ship was driven ashore on the coast of Maine, United States. She was on a voyage from Saint John, New Brunswick, British North America to Liverpool, Lancashire. She was refloated and towed in to Eastport, Maine in a waterlogged condition. Subsequently towed back to Saint John.
