= Blissfield =

Blissfield can refer to:

== Canada ==
- Blissfield Parish, New Brunswick

== United States ==
- Blissfield, Michigan
- Blissfield Township, Michigan
- Blissfield, Ohio
