= William R. Sapp =

American politician

Member of the U.S. House of Representatives from Ohio's 15th district
- In office March 4, 1853 – March 3, 1857
- Preceded by: William F. Hunter
- Succeeded by: Joseph Burns

Personal details
- Born: William Robinson Sapp; March 4, 1804 Cadiz, Ohio, U.S.
- Died: January 3, 1875 (aged 70) Mount Vernon, Ohio, U.S.
- Resting place: Mound View Cemetery
- Party: Whig; Anti-Nebraska

William Robinson Sapp (March 4, 1804 – January 3, 1875) was an American lawyer and politician who served two terms as a U.S. representative from Ohio from 1853 to 1857.

He is the uncle of William F. Sapp, a U.S. representative of Iowa.

== Biography ==
Born at Cadiz, Ohio, Sapp moved to Knox County, Ohio, where he attended the public schools. He engaged in the mercantile business in Danville. He studied law. He was admitted to the bar in 1833 and commenced practice at Millersburg, Ohio.

=== Early career ===
He served as prosecuting attorney of Holmes County, Ohio. Presidential elector in 1844 for Clay/Frelinghuysen.

He moved to Mount Vernon, Ohio, in 1846.

=== Congress ===
Sapp was elected as a Whig to the Thirty-third Congress and reelected as an Anti-Nebraska candidate to the Thirty-fourth Congress (March 4, 1853 – March 3, 1857). He was an unsuccessful candidate for reelection.

=== Later career and death ===
Assessor of internal revenue for the thirteenth district 1869-1872. He served as collector of internal revenue from 1872 until his death in Mount Vernon, Ohio, January 3, 1875. He was interred in Mound View Cemetery.

== Sources ==
- United States Congress. "William R. Sapp (id: S000061)". Biographical Directory of the United States Congress.

U.S. House of Representatives
Preceded by William Kennon, Jr.	United States Representative from Ohio's 15th congressional district 1853–1857	Succeeded by Joseph Burns

- Taylor, William Alexander; Taylor, Aubrey Clarence (1899). Ohio statesmen and annals of progress: from the year 1788 to the year 1900 ... Vol. 1. State of Ohio. p. 255.
