= Harry Clay (disambiguation) =

Harry Clay (1881–1964) was an English footballer.

Harry Clay may also refer to:

- Henry "Harry" Clay (1849–1884), see Clay family
- Harry Clay (showman), associate of Jim Gerald in 1920s
- Harry Clay (businessman) on 1952 Birthday Honours

== See also ==
- Harold Clay (1886–1961), British trade unionist
- Henry Clay (disambiguation)
