= Elisha Warfield =

American physician

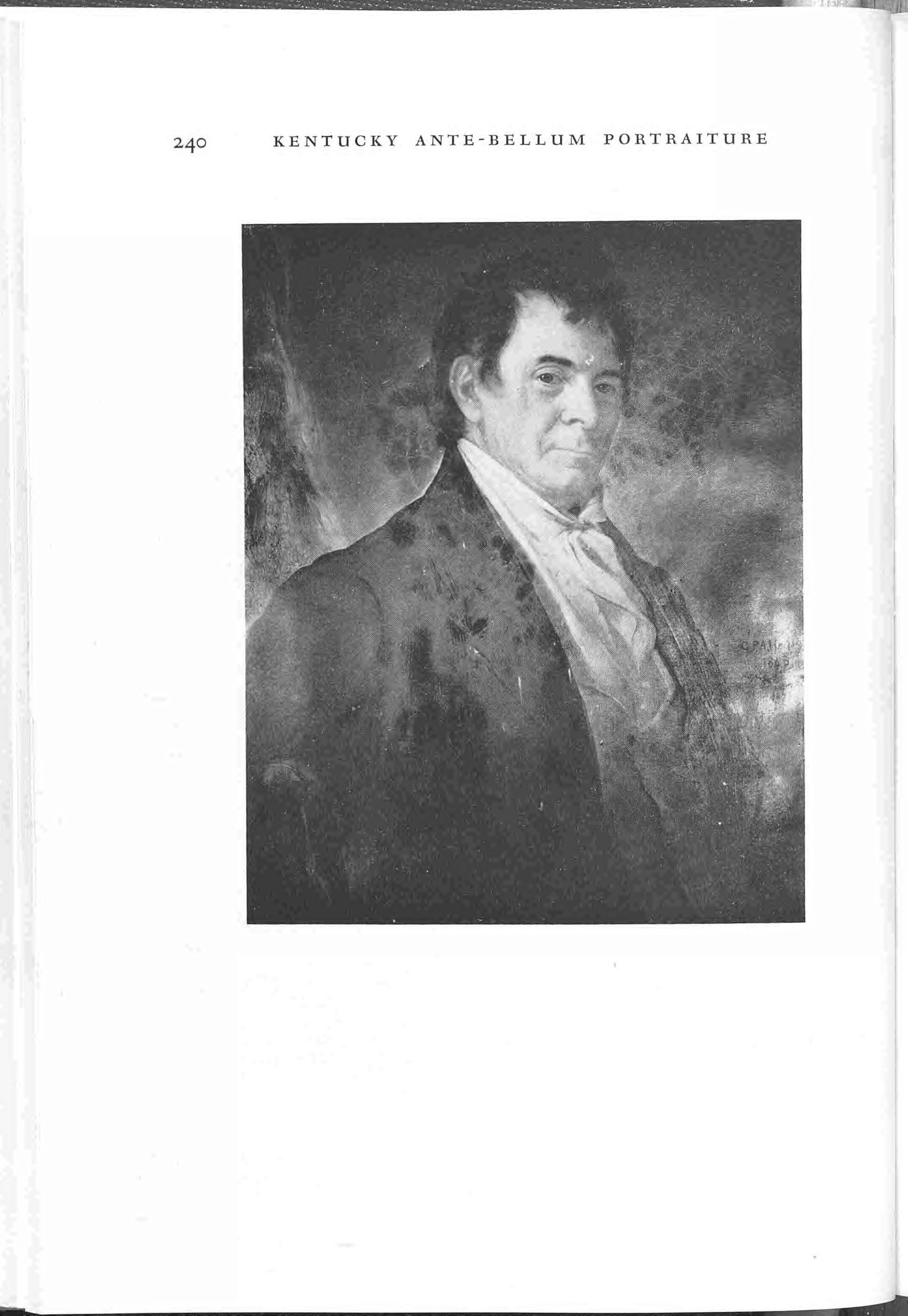
- portrait by L. Rowley Jacobs after G. P. A. Healy
- Born: February 5, 1781; Anne Arundel County, Maryland; United States
- Died: May 15, 1859 (aged 78); Lexington, Kentucky; United States
- Resting place: Lexington Cemetery
- Education: Transylvania University
- Occupations: Physician, Academic; Racehorse breeder
- Spouse: Maria Barr (1785–1866) Mary Jane Warfield Clay
- Children: 9, including Mary Jane
- Relatives: Catherine Anne Warfield (daughter-in-law); Cassius Marcellus Clay (son-in-law); Charlton Hunt (son-in-law)
- Honors: Warfield Place, Lexington, Kentucky

Elisha Warfield Jr. (February 5, 1781 – May 15, 1859) was an American medical doctor and a Thoroughbred racehorse owner and breeder whom Thoroughbred Heritage calls "one of the most important early figures in Kentucky racing and breeding."

== Early life and education ==
Born in Maryland, Elisha Jr. moved with his family to Lexington, Kentucky when he was nine years old. He was tutored privately and obtained a degree in medicine from Transylvania University.

On January 15, 1805, he married Maria Barr, with whom he had ten children. Their daughter Mary Jane Warfield married Cassius Marcellus Clay, who became a prominent politician and abolitionist in Kentucky.

Warfield became a very successful medical practitioner in Lexington. He was selected as the first Professor of Surgery and Obstetrics at the newly established medical school at Transylvania University.

Active in community development, in 1830 Elisha Warfield was a founding shareholder of the Lexington & Ohio Railway Company. In 1834 it connected Lexington to the state capital of Frankfort, Kentucky.

== Thoroughbred horses ==
Around the time of his marriage, Elisha Warfield began racing and breeding Thoroughbred horses. In 1809 he was one of the founding members of the Lexington Jockey Club, consisting of owners of the racehorses and breeding farms.

In 1821 Warfield decided to devote his energies to breeding, training and racing Thoroughbreds full-time. In 1826, he was one of the founders of the Kentucky Association, which built Lexington Race Course on land adjacent to his stud farm.

Known as The Meadows, Warfield's stud farm was located on Winchester Pike on the Northeast side of Lexington. It was where he bred Lexington, a U.S. Racing Hall of Fame Thoroughbred stallion. Foaled at The Meadows on March 29, 1850, and originally named Darley, the colt was very successful on the racetrack, winning six of his seven starts. As a breeding stallion, he is considered one of the greatest in United States history. Between 1861 and 1878, Lexington was ranked as the leading sire in North America a record sixteen times, of which fourteen were consecutive years. As of 2008, Lexington's record remains intact.

Warfield and his brother Benjamin, an attorney, were members of the group that founded Lexington Cemetery in 1849. Elisha Warfield was buried here following his 1859 death at his Lexington home.

The Meadows stud farm was eventually sold, with portions of the property parceled off. Prominent Kentucky horseman Daniel Swigert owned the stud for a time before selling it in August 1888. Increased population in the city put pressure on surrounding real estate. Developers acquired the property in 1945 and subdivided it for residential use as The Meadows.

Warfield is portrayed in the best selling novel Horse by Geraldine Brooks, published in 2022. The book is structured upon the life of the racehorse Lexington.
