= Helmick Covered Bridge =

- U.S. National Register of Historic Places
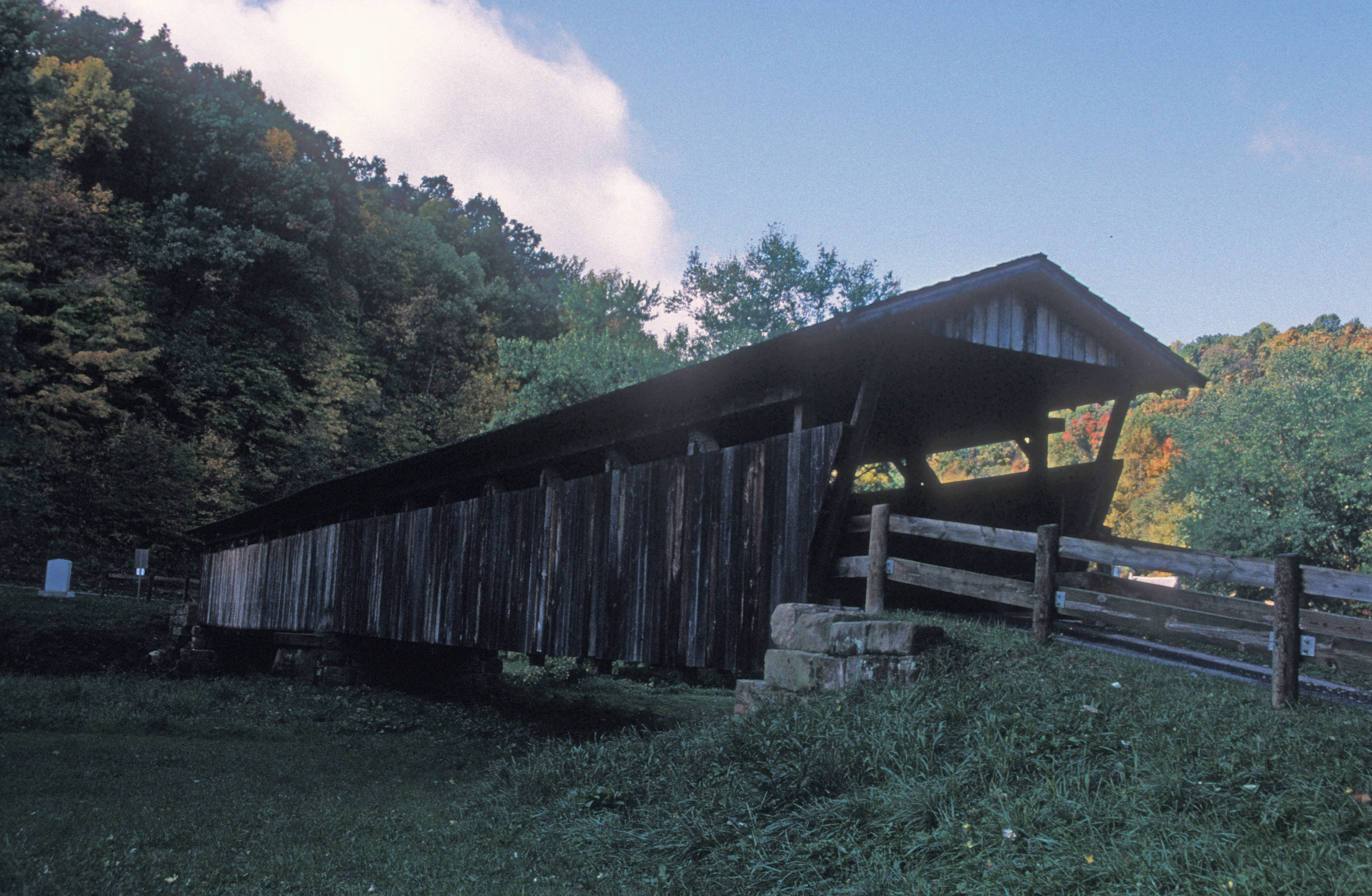

- Location within Ohio
- Location: E of Blissfield on Twnshp. Rd. 25, Blissfield, Ohio
- Coordinates: 40°23′35″N 81°56′34″W
- Area: less than one acre
- Built: 1863
- Built by: Shrake, John
- Architectural style: Two-Span Wooden Truss
- NRHP reference No.: 75001348
- Added to NRHP: June 18, 1975

The Helmick Covered Bridge, near Blissfield, Ohio, was built in 1863. It was listed on the National Register of Historic Places in 1975.

It is located east of Blissfield on Township Road 25, in Clark Township, Coshocton County, Ohio. It was built by John Shrake and is a two-span wooden truss covered bridge.

The bridge cost $2,107. It is asserted to be one of the oldest covered bridges in Ohio. "It was an integral part of commerce in the village of Helmick during the early days. The bridge provided access to two grist mills used by farmers from as far as 25 miles away. Named for Congressman William Helmick of Tuscarawas County, the covered bridge was built by John Shrake of Newark, Ohio. The bridge fell into decay, and was closed in 1981. Citizens raised over $250,000 to restore the bridge and completed the project in 1996."

== See also ==
- Helmick Mill Covered Bridge, in Morgan County, Ohio, also NRHP-listed
