= Joseph Morris (Ohio politician) =

American politician

Member of the U.S. House of Representatives from Ohio's 15th district
- In office March 4, 1843 – March 3, 1847
- Preceded by: Sherlock J. Andrews
- Succeeded by: William Kennon, Jr.

Member of the Ohio House of Representatives
- In office 1833-1834

Personal details
- Born: October 16, 1795 Greene County, Pennsylvania, U.S.
- Died: October 23, 1854 (aged 59) Woodsfield, Ohio, U.S.
- Resting place: Morris Cemetery
- Party: Democratic

Joseph Morris (October 16, 1795 – October 23, 1854) was an American politician who served as a U.S. representative from Ohio from 1843 to 1847.

He was the father of James Remley Morris, who served in the U.S. Congress during the Civil War.

== Early life and career ==
Born in Greene County, Pennsylvania, Morris attended the public schools. He was sheriff of Greene County in 1824. He moved to Woodsfield, Ohio, in 1829 and engaged in mercantile pursuits. He served as a member of the State house of representatives in 1833 and 1834.

== Congress ==
Morris was elected as a Democrat to the Twenty-eighth and Twenty-ninth Congresses (March 4, 1843 – March 3, 1847) from Ohio's 15th Congressional district. He was not a candidate for renomination in 1846.

== Retirement and death ==
After retiring from the United States Congress he resumed business interests and then died in Woodsfield, Ohio on October 23, 1854. Morris was buried in Morris Cemetery, near Woodsfield.

== Sources ==
- United States Congress. "Joseph Morris (id: M000980)". Biographical Directory of the United States Congress.

U.S. House of Representatives
Preceded by Sherlock J. Andrews	United States Representative from Ohio's 15th congressional district 1843–1847	Succeeded by William Kennon, Jr.
