= William F. Hunter =

American politician

William Forrest Hunter

Member of the U.S. House of Representatives from Ohio's 15th district
- In office March 4, 1849 – March 3, 1853
- Preceded by: William Kennon, Jr.
- Succeeded by: William R. Sapp

Personal details
- Born: December 10, 1808 Alexandria, Virginia, U.S.
- Died: March 30, 1874 (aged 65) Woodsfield, Ohio, U.S.
- Resting place: Woodsfield Cemetery
- Party: Whig

William Forrest Hunter (December 10, 1808 – March 30, 1874) was an American lawyer and politician who served two terms as a U.S. representative from Ohio from 1849 to 1853.

== Early life and career ==
Born in Alexandria, Virginia, Hunter received a common-school training. He studied law and was admitted to the bar. He commenced practice in Woodsfield, Ohio.

== Congress ==
Hunter was elected as a Whig to the Thirty-first and Thirty-second Congresses (March 4, 1849 – March 3, 1853). He was not a candidate for renomination in 1852.

== Death ==
He died in Woodsfield, Ohio, on March 30, 1874, and was interred in Woodsfield Cemetery.

== Sources ==
- United States Congress. "William F. Hunter (id: H000992)". Biographical Directory of the United States Congress.

U.S. House of Representatives
Preceded by William Kennon, Jr.	United States Representative from Ohio's 15th congressional district 1849–1853	Succeeded by William R. Sapp
