= William Helmick =

American politician (1817–1888)

Member of the U.S. House of Representatives from Ohio's 15th district
- In office March 4, 1859 – March 3, 1861
- Preceded by: Joseph Burns
- Succeeded by: Robert H. Nugen

Personal details
- Born: September 6, 1817 Canton, Ohio, US
- Died: March 31, 1888 (aged 70) Washington, D.C., US
- Resting place: Congressional Cemetery
- Party: Republican

William Helmick (September 6, 1817 – March 31, 1888) was an American lawyer and politician who served one term as a U.S. representative from Ohio from 1859 to 1861.

== Biography ==
Born near Canton, Ohio, Helmick attended the public schools and later studied law. He was admitted to the bar in 1845 and commenced practice in New Philadelphia, Ohio. He served as prosecuting attorney of Tuscarawas County in 1851.

Helmick was elected as a Republican to the Thirty-sixth Congress (March 4, 1859 – March 3, 1861). He was an unsuccessful candidate for reelection in 1860 to the Thirty-seventh Congress.

He was appointed by President Abraham Lincoln as chief clerk of the Pension Office on May 3, 1861, and served until January 31, 1865. He then resumed the practice of law in Washington, D.C., and was later appointed Justice of the Peace by President Rutherford B. Hayes in 1877.

== Death and legacy ==
He died in Washington, D.C., March 31, 1888, and was interred in the Congressional Cemetery.

The Helmick Covered Bridge is named for him and is listed on the National Register of Historic Places.

== Sources ==
- United States Congress. "William Helmick (id: H000462)". Biographical Directory of the United States Congress.

U.S. House of Representatives
Preceded by Joseph Burns	United States Representative from Ohio's 15th congressional district 1859–1861	Succeeded by Robert H. Nugen
