= Robert H. Nugen =

American politician

Robert Nugen

Member of the U.S. House of Representatives from Ohio's 15th district
- In office March 4, 1861 – March 3, 1863
- Preceded by: William Helmick
- Succeeded by: James R. Morris

Personal details
- Born: Robert Hunter Nugen; July 16, 1809 Washington County, Pennsylvania
- Died: February 28, 1872 (aged 62) Newcomerstown, Ohio
- Resting place: Newcomerstown Cemetery
- Party: Democratic

Robert Hunter Nugen (July 16, 1809 – February 28, 1872) was an American politician who served one term as a U.S. representative from Ohio from 1861 to 1863, during the American Civil War.

== Biography ==
Born near Hallidays Cove, Washington County, Pennsylvania, Nugen moved to Ohio in 1811 with his parents, who settled in Columbiana County, Ohio. He received a limited education.

=== Early career ===
He moved to Tuscarawas County in 1828 and engaged in agricultural pursuits, as well as being a contractor for some time. He held several local political offices and was delegate to the Democratic National Convention at Charleston in 1860.

=== Congress ===
Nugen was elected as a Democrat to the Thirty-seventh Congress (March 4, 1861 - March 3, 1863).

=== Death ===
Retiring from politics, Nugen was the superintendent of the Ohio Canal until his death in Newcomerstown, Ohio, on February 28, 1872. He was interred in Newcomerstown Cemetery.

U.S. House of Representatives
Preceded by William Helmick	United States Representative from Ohio's 15th congressional district 1861–1863	Succeeded by James R. Morris
