= Laura Clay =

American suffragist (1849–1941)

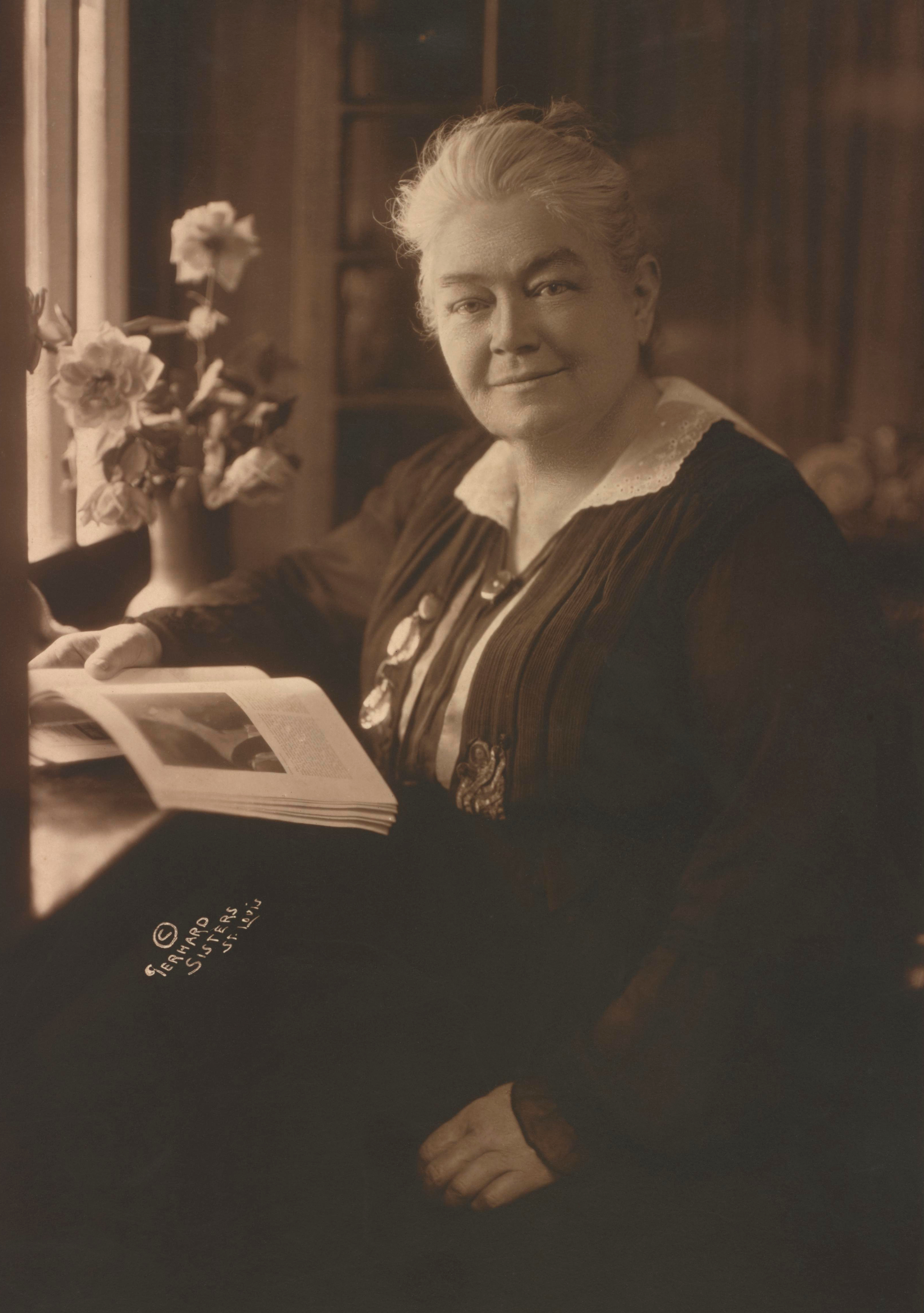
- Portrait by the Gerhard Sisters, 1916
- Born: February 9, 1849; White Hall, Kentucky, U.S.
- Died: June 29, 1941 (aged 92); Kentucky, U.S.
- Burial place: Lexington Cemetery
- Education: University of Michigan; University of Kentucky
- Occupations: Suffragist; orator; politician
- Political party: Democratic
- Parents: Cassius Marcellus Clay; Mary Jane Warfield Clay
- Relatives: Mary Barr Clay (sister); Brutus J. Clay II (brother)

Laura Clay (February 9, 1849 – June 29, 1941) was American suffragist and activist. She was a leader of the American women's suffrage movement and the co-founder and first president of the Kentucky Equal Rights Association. She was one of the most important suffragists in the South, favoring the states' rights approach to suffrage. A powerful orator, she was active in the Democratic Party and had important leadership roles in local, state and national politics. In 1920 at the Democratic National Convention, she was one of two women, alongside Cora Wilson Stewart, to be the first women to have their names placed into nomination for the presidency at the convention of a major political party.

== Family and early life ==
A daughter of Cassius Marcellus Clay and his wife Mary Jane Warfield, Clay was born at their estate, White Hall, near Richmond, Kentucky. The youngest of four daughters, Laura was raised largely by her mother, due to her father's long absences as he pursued his political career and activities as an abolitionist. At age 15, Laura started to question the inferior status of women in society by confiding in her diary that "I think I have a mind superior to that of many boys my age." Clay was educated at Sayre School in Lexington, Kentucky, Mrs. Sarah Hoffman's Finishing School in New York City, the University of Michigan, and the University of Kentucky.

Clay's parents divorced in 1878. After the divorce, Clay became aware of the inequities between married men and women and their property rights. This inequality galvanized Clay's older sisters, Mary and Sarah "Sallie" Clay Bennett to join the women's rights movement, as did Laura and her younger sister, Annie (later Mrs. Dabney Crenshaw, a co-founder of the Equal Suffrage League of Virginia).

== Kentucky Woman Suffrage Association ==
The 11th Annual Meeting of the American Woman Suffrage Association (AWSA) was held in Louisville, Kentucky on October 26 and 27, 1881. This was the first time Louisville hosted a national suffrage event - and it was the first such event in the South. AWSA President Lucy Stone and Mary Barr Clay (who became AWSA president in 1883) met at the home of Clay's mother Mary Jane Warfield Clay in Lexington, Kentucky. Stone convinced the younger sister Laura Clay to make a presentation at the convention.

After the convention, Laura founded Kentucky's first suffrage organization, the Kentucky Woman Suffrage Association, which was the first in the South. While there were some individual projects undertaken by this new organization, Laura admitted later in life that she was not up to the task. She kept copies of the original constitution, which included a list of charter members.

== The Kentucky Equal Rights Association ==
After the AWSA convention in Cincinnati in 1888, the Clay sisters and a group of other women, including Josephine K. Henry, founded the Kentucky Equal Rights Association (KERA). Laura Clay was again elected president and served until 1912.

One of the missions of the KERA was to improve the legal status of women in Kentucky and increase educational opportunities. Clay was succeeded by her distant cousin Madeline McDowell Breckinridge. The organization lobbied successfully for a range of legislative reforms, such as protecting married women's wages and property, requiring state women's mental hospitals to have female doctors on staff, inducing Transylvania University and Central University to admit women students, raising the age of marriage consent for girls to 16 from 12, and establishing juvenile courts. They also inspired the University of Kentucky to build its first dormitory for women.

== Involvement with the National American Woman Suffrage Association ==
During the 1890s, Clay became active in the National American Woman Suffrage Association and became a colleague of Carrie Chapman Catt, Alice Stone Blackwell, Catherine Waugh McCulloch, Alice Lloyd, and other national leaders of the women's rights movement. She traveled nationally speaking on behalf of women's suffrage and established suffrage societies in nine states. She worked closely with Henry Blackwell, who proposed the Southern Strategy. He wanted to convince southern legislators that they could maintain their white supremacy by allowing only educated women to vote. After being an ally of Blackwell, Clay convinced the NAWSA to adopt the Southern Strategy, which would lobby for only educated (primarily white women) to vote. Clay understood that NAWSA would gain male support only if they accepted the white supremacist politics, so she was eventually able to convince Anthony to accept this racist strategy. By 1903, NAWSA excluded black members from their New Orleans convention.

=== The Kentucky Plan ===
Known as one of "Aunt Susan's Girls", Laura Clay took on a national leadership role as chair of NAWSA's Southern Committee; in 1896 she was elected auditor. She had much influence on the NAWSA Business Committee that set the national organization's priorities.

In 1903 Clay was elected as chair of NAWSA's new Increase of Membership Committee and served in that role for twenty years. She developed a new approach to gaining members that came to be known as "The Kentucky Plan". Her idea was to demonstrate through growth in suffrage clubs' membership numbers, that a significant number of women would identify as wanting the right to vote. This fit neatly into the NAWSA strategies of producing statistics and quantification through graphics explaining the need for - and the progress toward - women gaining the right to vote. To get those higher numbers of membership rolls, Clay recommended that local clubs hold only one meeting per year, and that one only for the purpose of collecting names and dues. Clay saw that in Kentucky it was difficult to maintain active interest in the rural areas for the movement. She made membership dues optional as long as local groups would keep on file signed pledges for support. These numbers of pledges would count as membership numbers. However, this method did not build enough enthusiasm to gain supporters needed at the local levels to convince male legislators of the need for change.

=== Woman's Peace Party ===
Clay joined the Woman's Peace Party (a forerunner of the Women's International League for Peace and Freedom), which had been founded in 1915 by Carrie Chapman Catt, Jane Addams, and others. Clay served as the party's chairman in Kentucky's 7th Congressional District. She left the party when the United States entered World War I and actively supported the war effort.

=== From NAWSA's Southern Strategy to Southern States Woman Suffrage Conference ===
Clay also was an advocate of states' rights. After Kate M. Gordon organized the Southern States Woman Suffrage Conference to lobby state legislatures for laws to enfranchise white women, Clay advocated rejection of a federal solution for women's voting rights. In 1916 she was elected vice-president-at-large of the Southern States Woman Suffrage Conference, which opposed obtaining suffrage through an amendment to the U.S. Constitution. Clay opposed passage of the Nineteenth Amendment as she believed that it violated states' rights (and the ability of states to restrict extended franchise only to white women). To see a detailed argument by Clay on this subject, read the "Debate before the Woman's Club of Central Kentucky, October 18th, 1919. Won by the Negative - Miss Clay."

== Opposition to federal amendment for woman suffrage ==
In 1913, Clay broke from the KERA and the NAWSA because of her opposition to the Susan B. Anthony Amendment. The tension between Clay and Catt increased when Catt decided that all state action should be put off, instead focusing on the national amendment. Since Clay was a Democrat and favored states' rights, she aligned closely with President Wilson's stance on the issue: suffrage should be up to each individual state, and there should be no national amendment. She believed that enfranchising a large number of "inexperienced voters", code language for black women, was not such a good idea. She furthered her opposition to the federal amendment by saying that the amendment was just the national government supervising state elections, and thus infringing on states' choices in the matter. Clay wanted the KERA to campaign separately for suffrage and not resort to a national amendment and extend its supremacy over the states. Clay believed that the Enforcing Clause of the Nineteenth Amendment, and the resulting supervision of state elections, would lead to tyranny and centralized power in Washington, D.C. Although many claimed that Clay opposed the national amendment on racial grounds, she denied that was the case, insisting that the amendment infringed on states' rights.

== Later years ==
A devout Episcopalian, Clay also worked for decades to open lay leadership of the Episcopal Church to women.

In 1920 Laura Clay was a founder of the Democratic Women's Club of Kentucky. That same year, she served as a delegate at the 1920 Democratic National Convention held in San Francisco between June 28 and July 6, 1920. Laura Clay made American history as one of the first women (alongside fellow Kentucky delegate Cora Wilson Stewart) to be put forward as a candidate for the Presidential nomination of a major political party. Thanks to the Kentucky delegates' chairman Augustus Owsley Stanley, Clay and Stewart were the first two women to receive a vote each for candidate for president.

On the 44th ballot, Governor James M. Cox of Ohio was nominated as the Democratic Party candidate for president with Franklin D. Roosevelt, the assistant secretary of the Navy from New York, as his vice-presidential running mate. The Democratic Party's platform supported women's suffrage; after a hard-fought series of votes in the U.S. Congress and in state legislatures, the Nineteenth Amendment became part of the U.S. Constitution on August 26, 1920. (It states, "The right of citizens of the United States to vote shall not be denied or abridged by the United States or by any State on account of sex.")

In 1928 Clay actively supported the presidential candidacy of Governor Al Smith of New York and opposed Prohibition. In 1933, she served as temporary chairman of the Kentucky Convention to ratify the Twenty-First Amendment, which was ratified on December 5, 1933, and repealed the Eighteenth Amendment (that had introduced Prohibition when ratified on January 16, 1919).

Clay slipped from public life in her last decade. At the age of 92, she died on June 29, 1941, and was interred at Lexington Cemetery.

== Key speeches ==
- "The Race Question Again," Kentucky Gazette, April 1890. Box 17, Scrapbook. Laura Clay Papers, Special Collections, University of Kentucky (hereafter LCP).
- "Elections." December 12, 1890. Proceedings and Debates in the Convention Assembled at Frankfort, on the eighth day of September 1890, to adopt, amend or change the Constitution of the State of Kentucky. 2:2090-2093. Frankfort, Ky.: E. Polk Johnson, 1890.
- "Speech on Partial Suffrage (Kentucky Constitutional Convention, December 12, 1890) WikiSource
- "Argument from Bible Teachings." Address, 1894 NAWSA Convention. Woman's Tribune (February 20, 1894). Box 17, Scrapbook, LCP.
- "A New Tool." Address, WCTU Banquet. Lexington, Kentucky. February 11, 1913. Box 16, LCP.
- "Women and the Ballot." February 1919, Box 11, LCP.
- "The Citizens Committee for a State Suffrage Amendment: Open Letter to the Public." June 12, 1919. Box 11, LCP.
- "Why I Am a Democrat." Democratic Woman's Journal. December 1929. Box 12, LCP.

== See also ==
- Clay family
- Susan B. Anthony
- Women's Christian Temperance Union

== Bibliography ==
- Paul E. Fuller, Laura Clay and the Woman's Rights Movement Lexington: The University Press of Kentucky, 1975. ISBN 978-0-8131-1299-2
- John M. Murphy, "Laura Clay (1894–1941), a Southern Voice for Woman's Rights," pp. 99–111 in Women Public Speakers in the United States, 1800–1925: A Bio-Critical Sourcebook. Karlyn Kohrs Campbell, ed. ABC-CLIO, 1993. ISBN 0-313-27533-5
- Mary Jane Smith, "Laura Clay (1849-1941): States' Rights and Southern Suffrage Reform," pp. 119–139 in Kentucky Women: Their Lives and Times. Melissa A. McEuen and Thomas H. Appleton Jr., eds. Athens: The University of Georgia Press, 2015. ISBN 978-0-8203-4452-2
