= True American =

Defunct American newspaper

True American was an antislavery newspaper which was printed in 1845 in Fayette County, Kentucky by Cassius Marcellus Clay. After the publishing of an incendiary anti-slavery editorial titled "What is Become of the Slaves in the United States?" in August 1845, a group of outraged citizens ran the newspaper out of Lexington, Kentucky with a court injunction. Cassius continued to publish his paper through 1847 after moving his publishing company to Cincinnati, Ohio.
