= Joseph Burns (American politician) =

American politician (1800–1875)

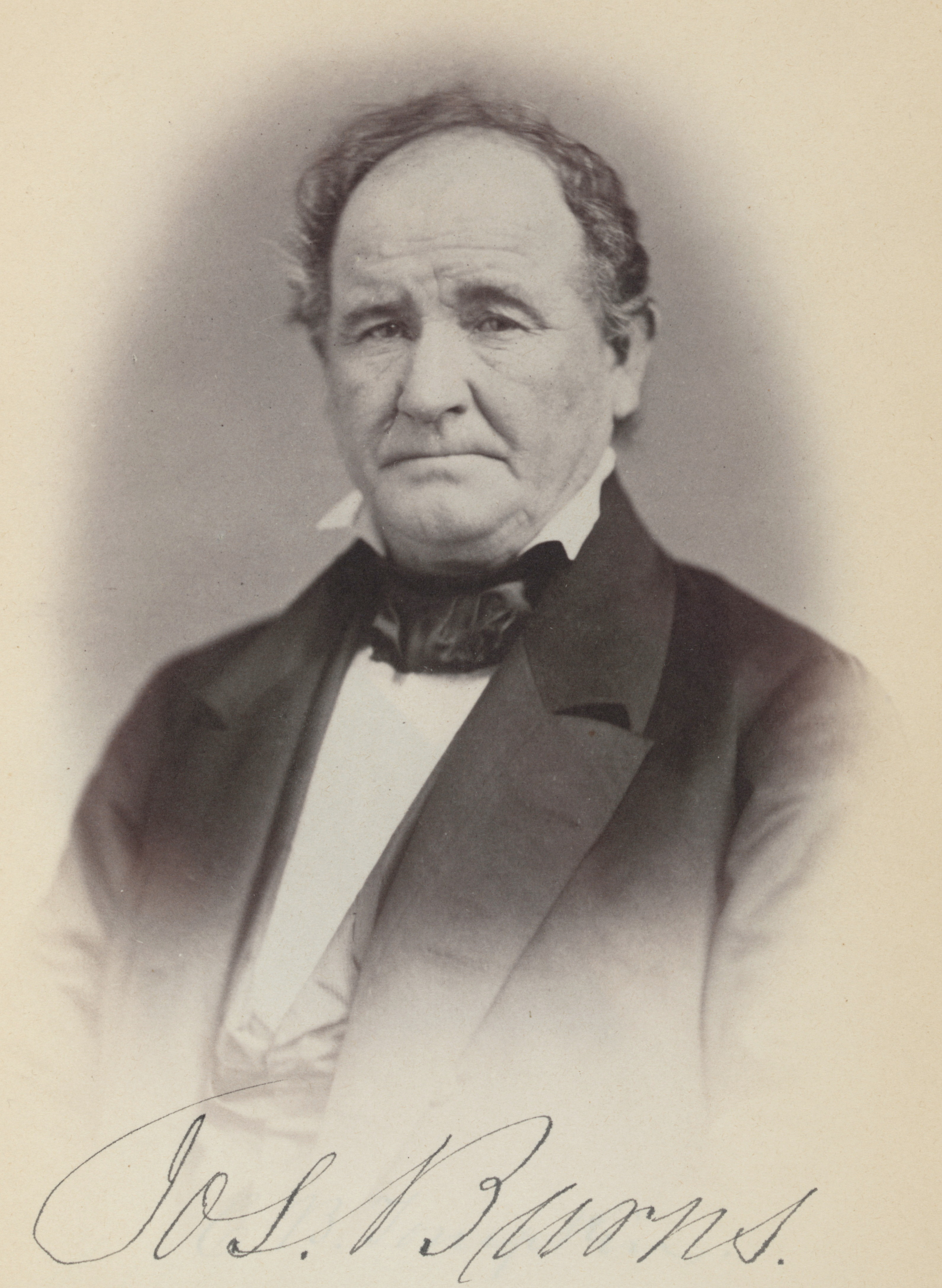
- in 35th Congress

Member of the U.S. House of Representatives from Ohio's 15th district
- In office March 4, 1857 – March 3, 1859
- Preceded by: William R. Sapp
- Succeeded by: William Helmick

Member of the Ohio House of Representatives from the Coshocton County district
- In office December 3, 1838 – December 1, 1839
- Preceded by: James Matthews; F. W. Thornhill
- Succeeded by: James Ravencraft
- In office December 7, 1840 – December 5, 1841
- Preceded by: James Ravencraft
- Succeeded by: Jesse Meredith

Personal details
- Born: March 11, 1800 Waynesboro, Virginia, U.S.
- Died: May 12, 1875 (aged 75) Coshocton, Ohio, U.S.
- Resting place: Oak Ridge Cemetery
- Party: Democratic

Joseph Burns (March 11, 1800 – May 12, 1875) was an American politician who served one term as U.S. Representative from Ohio from 1857 to 1859.

== Biography ==
Born in Waynesboro, Virginia, Burns moved to Ohio with his parents in 1815. Where they initially settled in New Philadelphia in 1815. Later moving to Coshocton, Coshocton County, in 1816. He attended the urban schools.

=== Early career ===
He engaged in industrial pursuits and was the Auditor of Coshocton County from 1821 to 1838. He served as member of the State House of Representatives 1838–1840. He served as County clerk from 1843 to 1851. He served as a major general in the State militia. He was a Presidential elector in 1848 for Cass/Butler.

=== Congress ===
Burns was elected as a Democrat to the Thirty-fifth Congress (March 4, 1857 – March 3, 1859). He was an unsuccessful candidate for reelection in 1858 to the Thirty-sixth Congress.

=== Later career ===
He was engaged in the drug business in Coshocton, Ohio. Probate judge of Coshocton County.

=== Death and burial ===
He died in Coshocton, Ohio, on May 12, 1875. He was interred in Oak Ridge Cemetery.

== Sources ==
- Taylor, William Alexander; Taylor, Aubrey Clarence (1899). Ohio statesmen and annals of progress: from the year 1788 to the year 1900 ... Vol. 1. State of Ohio. p. 255.
- United States Congress. "Joseph Burns (id: B001128)". Biographical Directory of the United States Congress.

U.S. House of Representatives
Preceded by William R. Sapp	United States Representative from Ohio's 15th congressional district 1857–1859	Succeeded by William Helmick
