= Helmick Mill Covered Bridge =

- U.S. National Register of Historic Places
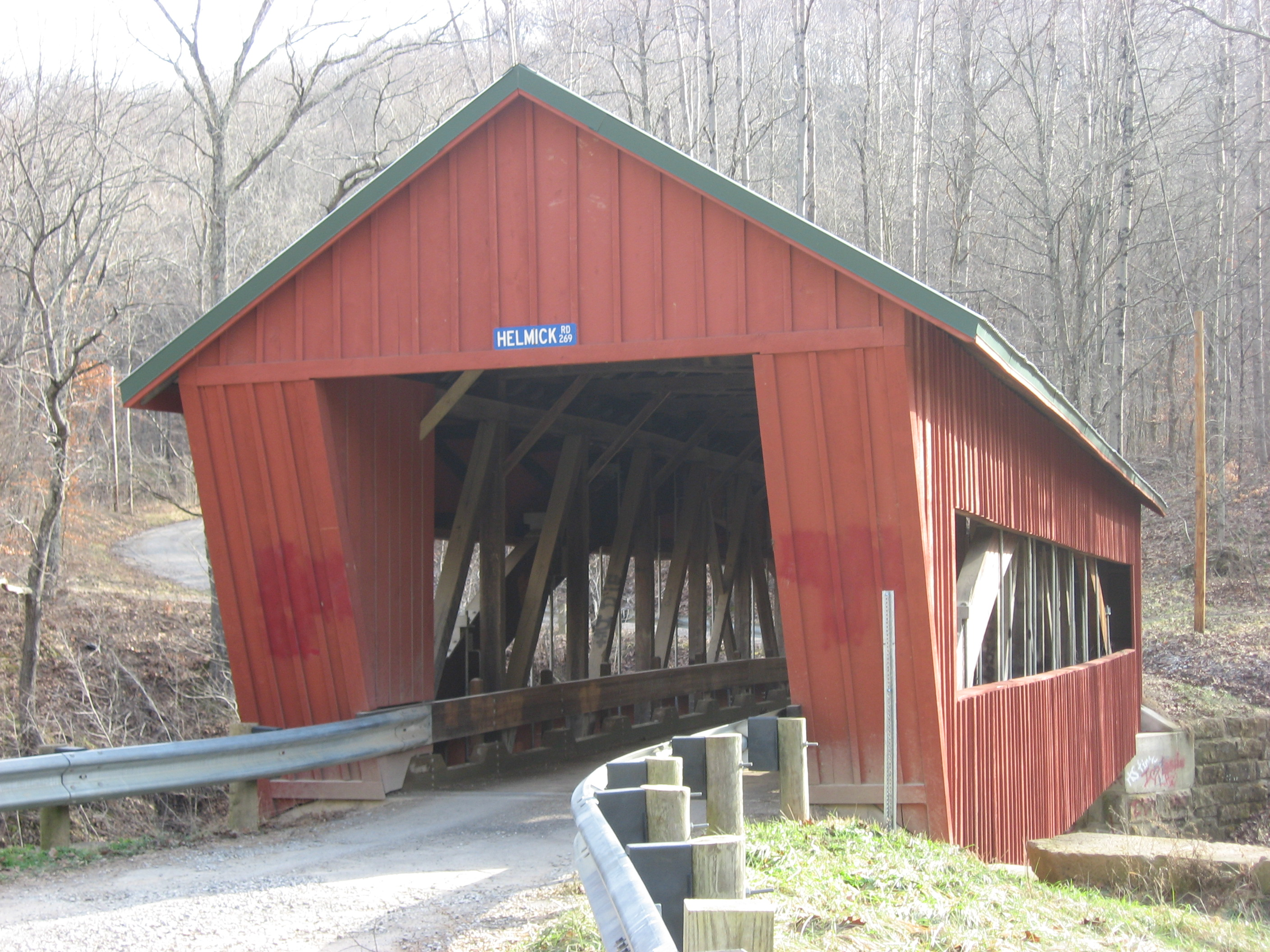

- Location within Ohio
- Nearest city: Malta, Ohio
- Coordinates: 39°43′11″N 81°56′32″W
- Area: less than one acre
- Built: 1867
- Built by: Price, Samuel
- Architectural style: Covered bridge
- NRHP reference No.: 99000098
- Added to NRHP: February 5, 1999

The Helmick Mill Covered Bridge, in Deerfield Township, Morgan County, Ohio, near Malta, Ohio, was built in 1867 by Samuel Price who was paid $872. It was listed on the National Register of Historic Places in 1999. At this site in 1880, Joseph "Joe" Helmick owned a flouring mill and a saw mill on the falls where the flint rock outcrops. The flouring mill was on the south side and the saw mill on the north side, according to Aler's Reminiscences of Deerfield Township, p. 4, col. 1

It brings Township Road 269 over Island Run, northwest of Malta, and it is also known as Island Run Bridge.

It was built in 1867 and rehabilitated in 1991. It is a multiple kingpost through truss bridge, having total length of 72.2 feet and longest span of 33.1 feet.

== See also ==
- Helmick Covered Bridge, also NRHP-listed
