= Clay family =

Influential 19th-century U.S. political and business dynasty

The Clays were an influential nineteenth-century U.S. political and business dynasty. The Clays are of English stock, and there are quite a few Clay families still in England, and also in other parts of the world.

== Alphabetical list of American Clays ==
- Brutus Junius Clay (1808–1878), U.S. Congressman from Kentucky.
- Brutus J. Clay II (1847–1932), minister to Switzerland, son of Cassius Marcellus Clay
- Cassius Marcellus Clay (1810–1903), abolitionist, publisher, U.S. general, U.S. minister to Russia.
- Clement Claiborne Clay (1816–1882), U.S. Senator from Alabama.
- Clement Comer Clay (1789–1866), U.S. Senator from Alabama.
- Green Clay (1757–1828), member of the Virginia and Kentucky legislatures; Speaker of the Kentucky Senate.
- Green Clay Smith (1826–1895), U.S. Congressman from Kentucky and Territorial Governor of Montana.
- Henry Clay (1777–1852), U.S. Representative and Senator from Kentucky; Speaker of the House of Representatives; U.S. Secretary of State.
- Henry Clay, Jr. (1811–1847), Lt. Col. in the Second Kentucky Regiment, killed in the Battle of Buena Vista.
- Henry "Harry" Clay (1849–1884), Arctic explorer; candidate for Kentucky House of Representatives.
- James Brown Clay (1817–1864), U.S. Chargé d'affaires at Lisbon, Portugal; U.S. Representative from Kentucky; member of the Peace Conference of 1861; commissioned to raise a regiment for the Confederate States of America.
- James Brown Clay (1848–1906), aide-de-camp to Major General John C. Breckinridge.
- John Morrison Clay (1821–1887), thoroughbred racer and breeder.
- Josephine Russell Clay (1835–1920), thoroughbred breeder and author.
- Laura Clay (1849–1941), a leader in the women's suffrage movement.
- Mary Barr Clay (1839–1924), president of the American Woman Suffrage Association.
- Matthew Clay (1754–1815), U.S. Representative from Virginia.
- Matthew Clay (c.1795–1827), member of the Alabama Senate.
- Nathaniel W. Watkins (1796–1876), Confederate Army brigadier general and Speaker of the Missouri House of Representatives.
- Nestor Clay (1799–1835), Texas pioneer; representative at the 1832 and 1833 Texas Conventions.
- Susan Clay Sawitzky (1897–1981), U.S. poet.
- Tacitus Thomas Clay (1824–1868), mayor of Independence, Texas; Confederate army officer.
- Thomas Clay (b 1750), member of the first Kentucky Constitutional Convention.
- Thomas C. McCreery (1816–1890), U.S. Senator from Kentucky.
- Thomas Hart Clay (1803–1871), U.S. minister to Nicaragua and Honduras.
- Thomas Jacob Clay (1853–1939) Second Lieutenant, U.S. Army, who participated in the second capture of Geronimo.
- William Claude Clay (1917–2004) member of 2677th Office of Strategic Services Regiment (United States) and 2671st Special Reconnaissance Battalion (United States) of the Office of Strategic Services, won various medals of valor.

== Chronological list of American Clays ==
- Born 1750 Thomas Clay, member of the first Kentucky Constitutional Convention.
- 1754–1815 Matthew Clay, U.S. Representative from Virginia.
- 1757–1828 Green Clay, member of the Virginia and Kentucky legislatures; Speaker of the Kentucky Senate.
- 1777–1852 Henry Clay, U.S. Representative and Senator from Kentucky; Speaker of the House of Representatives; U.S. Secretary of State.
- 1789–1866 Clement Comer Clay, U.S. Senator from Alabama.
- 1795?–1827 Matthew Clay, member of the Alabama Senate.
- 1796–1876 Nathaniel W. Watkins, Confederate Army brigadier general and Speaker of the Missouri House of Representatives.
- 1799–1835 Nestor Clay, Texas pioneer; representative at the 1832 and 1833 Texas Conventions.
- 1803–1871 Thomas Hart Clay, U.S. minister to Nicaragua and Honduras.
- 1808–1878 Brutus Junius Clay, U.S. Congressman from Kentucky.
- 1810–1903 Cassius Marcellus Clay, abolitionist, publisher, U.S. general, U.S. minister to Russia.
- 1811–1847 Henry Clay, Jr., Lt. Col. in the Second Kentucky Regiment, killed in the Battle of Buena Vista.
- 1816–1882 Clement Claiborne Clay, U.S. Senator from Alabama.
- 1816–1890 Thomas C. McCreery, U.S. Senator from Kentucky.
- 1817–1864 James Brown Clay, U.S. Chargé d'affaires at Lisbon, Portugal; U.S. Representative from Kentucky; member of the Peace Conference of 1861; commissioned to raise a regiment for the Confederate States of America.
- 1821–1887 John Morrison Clay, thoroughbred racer and breeder.
- 1824–1868 Tacitus Thomas Clay, mayor of Independence, Texas; Confederate army officer.
- 1826–1895 Green Clay Smith, U.S. Congressman from Kentucky and Territorial Governor of Montana.
- 1835–1920 Josephine Russell Clay, thoroughbred breeder and author.
- 1839–1924 Mary Barr Clay, president of the American Woman Suffrage Association.
- 1847-1932 Brutus J. Clay II, minister to Switzerland, son of Cassius Marcellus Clay
- 1848–1906 James Brown Clay, aide-de-camp to Major General John C. Breckinridge.
- 1849–1884 Henry "Harry" Clay, Arctic explorer; candidate for Kentucky House of Representatives.
- 1849–1941 Laura Clay, a leader in the women's suffrage movement.
- 1853–1939 Thomas Jacob Clay Second Lieutenant, U.S. Army, who participated in the second capture of Geronimo.
- 1897–1981 Susan Clay Sawitzky, U.S. poet.
- 1917–2004 William Claude Clay member of 2677th Office of Strategic Services Regiment (United States) and 2671st Special Reconnaissance Battalion (United States) of the Office of Strategic Services, won various medals of valor.

== Descendants of enslaved people held by Clay family ==
- Henry Clay, Jr. owned an enslaved man named John Henry Clay among whose 20th century descendants were the boxer Muhammad Ali and his father, Cassius Marcellus Clay, Sr.:
- Cassius Marcellus Clay, Sr., grandson of John Henry Clay, named for the abolitionist Cassius Marcellus Clay.
  - His son, Muhammad Ali, born Cassius Marcellus Clay, Jr., boxer, activist, three-time heavyweight champion of the world, Sportsman of the Century.
  - Rahaman Ali, born Rudolph Arnett Clay (later rechristened to Rudolph Valentino), heavyweight boxer; younger brother and biographer of Muhammad Ali

== See also ==
- Clay family murders, 1988 murder in Nashville, Tennessee
