= 2677th Office of Strategic Services Regiment =

- Active: 15 July 1944 – 27 November 1944 {Absorbed by OSS Operational Command}
- Country: United States
- Branch: United States
- Type: Commando
- Size: Regiment
- Engagements: World War II
- Battle honours: Rome-Arno

2677th Office of Strategic Services Regiment was a commando (special operations capable) regiment that was seconded to the Office of Strategic Services (OSS) as an operational armed force.

The regiment was organized on 15 July 1944 at Algiers, North Africa, sponsored by the U.S. Fifth Army. It was transferred to Caserta, Italy, where it was absorbed into the OSS Operational Group Command on 27 November 1944.

== Honors ==
=== Campaign participation credit ===
- Rome-Arno
