= Henry Clay, Kentucky =

Unincorporated community in Kentucky, United States

Henry Clay
- Unincorporated community
- Location within the state of Kentucky Henry Clay (the United States)
- Coordinates: 37°18′41″N 82°28′36″W
- Country: United States
- State: Kentucky
- County: Pike
- Elevation: 1,020 ft (310 m)
- Time zone: UTC-6 (Central (CST))
  - Summer (DST): UTC-5 (CST)
- GNIS feature ID: 494057

Henry Clay is an unincorporated community and coal town located in Pike County, Kentucky, United States. It was also known as the Henry Clay Coal Camp.
