= White Hall State Historic Site =

- Whitehall
- U.S. National Register of Historic Places
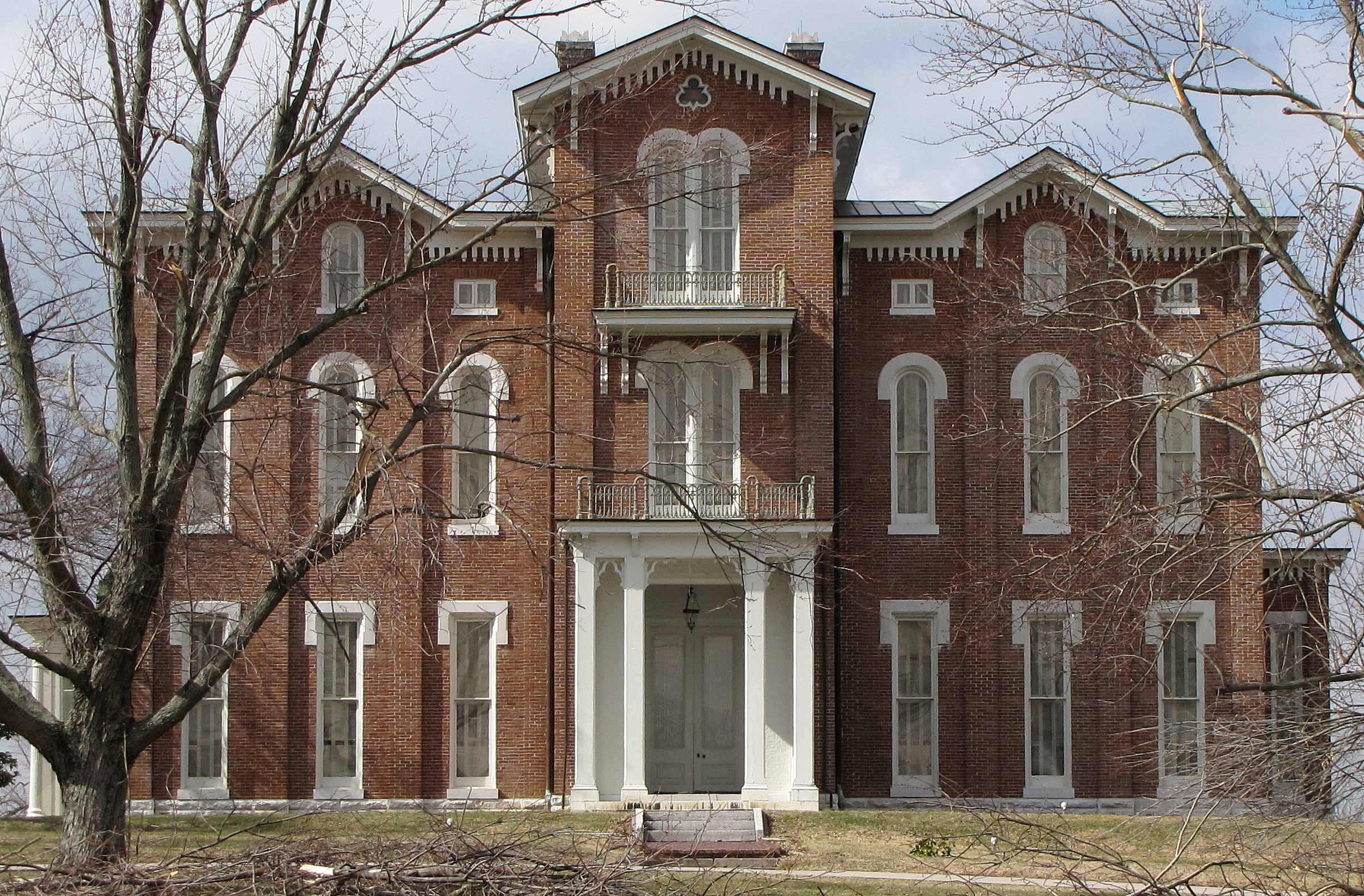
- White Hall in 2009

- Location within Kentucky Location within the United States
- Location: 500 White Hall Shrine Road
- Nearest city: Richmond, Kentucky
- Coordinates: 37°49′58″N 84°21′8″W
- Area: 13.6 acres (5.5 ha)
- Built: 1799
- Architect: Gen. Green Clay; Thomas Lewinski
- Architectural style: Italianate, Georgian
- NRHP reference No.: 71000352
- Added to NRHP: March 11, 1971

White Hall State Historic Site is a 14-acre (5.7 ha) park in Richmond, Kentucky, southeast of Lexington. White Hall was home to two legendary Kentucky statesmen: General Green Clay and his son General Cassius Marcellus Clay, as well as suffragists Mary Barr Clay and Laura Clay. On April 12, 2011, White Hall was designated as a national historic site in journalism by the Society of Professional Journalists, because of Clay's career as a publisher.

== White Hall/Clermont ==
The site's major feature is White Hall, the home of Kentucky legislator Cassius Marcellus Clay and Mary Jane Warfield Clay. He was an anti-slavery newspaper publisher, politician, soldier and Minister to Russia through the Lincoln, Johnson and Grant administrations. He published True American for nearly 25 years.

This restored 44-room Italianate house began as a 8-room structure built in 1798–1799 in the Georgian style by General Green Clay which he called Clermont. Mary Jane Warfield Clay, oversaw the enlarging of Clermont into the structure that is now White Hall. Thomas Lewinski was the architect. The Georgian style of Clermont was replaced with the Italianate style of White Hall. The renovation is said to have cost $40,000. Clermont originally faced south, but the entrance of White Hall was moved to face East.

Apart from its architecture, White Hall was also notable for its use of indoor plumbing. Rainwater was collected in a tub from the roof and was fed down to a toilet and copper bathtub.

The White Hall property has two outbuildings. The kitchen was originally built in 1790 when Green Clay owned the property. It originally served Clermont as the main kitchen, and the food was walked over to the warming kitchen of the main house. The Kitchen contains what is believed to be the largest existing fireplace surviving from the 19th century. The larger of the two buildings was used as living quarters for the enslaved peoples living on the White Hall estate.

== Notable residents ==
White Hall was first home to General Green Clay who built the original structure, Claremont. Clay was an early Kentucky settler and land surveyor. Green Clay made his fortune surveying land, keeping a portion of the land he surveyed as payment. Green Clay became one of the largest land and slave holders in Kentucky by the time of his death.

Cassius M. Clay was a Kentucky politician and emancipationist. Despite his father being one of the largest landholders and slaveholders in Kentucky, Clay supported the gradual freeing of enslaved peoples, which was unusual for men of his class at this time. Clay fought many duels over the subject during his life. Clay saw service in the Mexican War and was lauded as a hero upon his return home. Clay published an anti-slavery newspaper called The True American in Lexington, KY and was later forced to move production to Cincinnati, OH. Clay was an early founder of the republican party. Clay served as Lincoln's Ambassador to Russia during the American Civil War. It was during Clay's time in Russia that his wife, Mary Jane Warfield Clay, converted Clermont into what is now White Hall.

Cassius M. Clay's daughters Mary Barr Clay, Sally Clay, and Laura Clay also lived at White Hall. Mary Barr Clay was noted for her early support for women's suffrage. She was of great influence on her younger sisters, especially Laura, who would go on to be leaders in the women's suffrage movement. Laura Clay was the first woman to be placed in nomination for a major party's presidential ticket.

== Acquisition and restoration ==
The Madison County Garden Club members were among those who spearheaded the effort to preserve the historic home. The club consulted with several prominent Kentucky historical preservationists and preservation societies. Governor Edward Breathitt agreed to purchase White Hall from the current owners. The heirs of Cassius M. Clay, Warfield C. Bennett Jr., Ann C. Bennett, and Ester S. Bennett sold the property surrounding White Hall to the state of Kentucky in 1968. The land surrounding White Hall was purchased for $18,000 and the home was donated. The site became part of the state park system in 1968.

The house's restoration was completed and open to the public in 1971 under the leadership of Kentucky's First Lady Beula C. Nunn, with assistance of the Kentucky Mansions Preservation Foundation.

The Eastern Kentucky University Board of Regents voted to accept the transfer of White Hall State Historic Site from the State of Kentucky at their regularly scheduled meeting in February 2019. The State will pay EKU $50,000 for two years to help with any unforeseen costs of acquiring the property. EKU hopes to use the building as a real-world teaching opportunity for the Department of Recreation and Park Administration.

== Donated family items ==
Upon the death of Cassius M. Clay an estate sale was held at White Hall. It took place on October 8, 1903. The names of those who bought pieces of furniture from the auction were listed on the inventory and sale book of the State Bank & Trust Company and the Madison County Clerk's office. This list was used to track down these items to be reacquired by White Hall.

Cassius M. Clay's original appointment as US ambassador to Russia was donated to the State of Kentucky by Bruce Ferguson. The document bears the signature of then president Abraham Lincoln. The document is on display at White Hall State Historic Site.

Two tapestry rugs and a Louis XV table that once belonged to Green Clay and Cassius M. Clay were donated by Annabell Olsen of Somerset, KY. The tapestry rugs are from the Ming Dynasty prior to 1300. The colors, blues, reds, and gold have faded some. Olson found the rugs in a stove pipe in the White Hall kitchen. They were likely placed there to keep soot out when the wind blew. The Louis XV table was a gift to General Green Clay from General Lafayette. Green Clay became familiar with Lafayette when he visited Europe on behalf of the Continental Congress. Green Clay's son, Cassius M. Clay, held the table in such high regard that he would not allow anyone to touch the table. When a leg of the table was broken Clay was so concerned that he performed the repair work himself. The table is 36 inches in diameter and about the height of a modern-day coffee table. It is painted olive green, washed brick red and gold. The wood underneath the paint is unknown.

Pieces of a china set that once belonged to Cassius M. Clay were also donated by Mrs. William C. Benton of Denver, CO. The china is a portion of the original 104-piece setting that was used by Clay when he was the US ambassador to Russia. The plates have a gold medallion in the center and the outer rim is decorated in bands of gold and magenta. Other pieces of this set were already on display at White Hall.

A bed that once belonged to Brutus Junius Clay II was donated by Cecil Salter. Salter's father, Samuel, bought the bed at auction from an apartment in the old Benault Inn. Brutus Junius Clay II was the son of noted emancipationist and US ambassador to Russia Cassius M. Clay. Junius gained his own notoriety serving as a commissioner to the Paris Exposition in 1900 and then as US ambassador to Switzerland from 1905 to 1912. Junius also donated property on Glyndon Ave. Richmond, Kentucky, in memory of his wife, Pattie A. Clay, to form the first hospital in Madison County, Kentucky (Pattie A. Clay Hospital).
