= L. Rowley Jacobs =

L. Rowley (L. R.) Jacobs was an itinerant American portrait artist, who worked in the United States during the middle of the 19th century. L. R. was born in New York City circa 1823, of Italian parents. According to the 1860 United States census, he was an artist working in Cincinnati, Ohio. He was living there with his wife Anna and two children. This artist's work falls under the "folk art" category. His portraits are found beginning in the 1850s. He is known to have also worked in Illinois and New York. Beside working in the traditional oil method, he also worked in the medium of Reverse glass painting. It is said he died in Springfield, Illinois, after 1890.

== Works ==
Examples of his work may be found at the Detroit Historical Society, Gadsden Museum of Art the Illinois State Museum and the Illinois State Historical Library. He is known to have painted many portraits; among his subjects are, Abraham Lincoln and Edwin Forrest, a well-known actor of the 19th century.
