= William Kennon Jr. =

American politician

Member of the U.S. House of Representatives from Ohio's 15th district
- In office March 4, 1847 – March 3, 1849
- Preceded by: Joseph Morris
- Succeeded by: William F. Hunter

Personal details
- Born: June 12, 1802 Carrickfergus, County Antrim, Ireland, U.K.
- Died: October 19, 1867 (aged 65) St. Clairsville, Ohio, U.S.
- Resting place: Union Cemetery
- Party: Democratic
- Relations: William Kennon Sr. (cousin)
- Education: Franklin College

William Kennon Jr. (June 12, 1802 – October 19, 1867) was a lawyer, judge, and a U.S. representative from Ohio. He served for one term from 1847 to 1849.

== Early life ==
Born in Carrickfergus, County Antrim on the island of Ireland (the entirety of which was then part of the U.K.), Kennon, known locally as 'Kenno', immigrated to the United States in 1816 with his parents, who settled near Barnesville, Ohio. He was a first cousin of fellow U.S. Representative William Kennon Sr.

He attended the common schools and graduated from Franklin College, New Athens, Ohio, in 1826. Kennon studied law and was admitted to the bar in 1830.

== Career ==
He commenced practice in St. Clairsville, Ohio, and served as the prosecuting attorney of Belmont County from 1837 to 1841.

Kennon was elected as a Democrat to the Thirtieth Congress from March 4, 1847, until March 3, 1849. He was not a candidate for renomination, and instead resumed the practice of law. He served as judge of the court of common pleas of the fifteenth judicial district from 1865 to July 1, 1867, when he resigned.

== Personal life ==
Kennon was married to Elizabeth Kirkwood (1818–1899), daughter of Joseph Kirkwood and granddaughter of Revolutionary War hero Robert Kirkwood. Together, they were the parents of:

- Margaret A. Kennon (1852–1922), who married Allen C. Miller (1848–1892) in 1870.
- Newell Kirkwood Kennon (1855–1937), an attorney.
- Albert Wilson Kennon (1861–1949), an 1886 graduate of the Cincinnati Law School who married Ida Belle Updegraff (1868–1941), of Wheeling, West Virginia, in 1904.

He died in St. Clairsville on October 19, 1867, and was interred in Union Cemetery.

== Sources ==
U.S. House of Representatives
Preceded by Joseph Morris	United States Representative from Ohio's 15th congressional district 1847–1849	Succeeded by William F. Hunter
