= 2671st Special Reconnaissance Battalion (United States) =

- Active: 1 August 1944 - 1 October 1945
- Country: United States
- Branch: United States Army
- Part of: Office of Strategic Services

The 2671st Special Reconnaissance Battalion was an elite light infantry battalion unit that specializes in frontline military intelligence gathering and special reconnaissance in behind enemy lines areas.

It was organized at Caserta, Italy on 1 August 1944 under the sponsorship of U.S. 5th Army. It immediately was transferred to the Office of Strategic Services (OSS), where it remained for the duration of the war. It had been originally organized as the OSS Operational Group (Provisional) in North Africa on 4 May 1943.

== Campaign participation Credit ==
1. Naples-Foggia (9 September 1943 – 21 January 1944)
2. Rome-Arno (22 January 1944 – 9 September 1944)
3. North Apennines (10 September 1944 – 4 April 1945)
4. Po Valley (5 April 1945 – 8 May 1945)

The battalion was located in Salzburg, Austria on 14 August 1945

The battalion was disbanded in Austria on 1 October 1945.
