= Cassius Marcellus Clay =

American politician from Kentucky (1810–1903)

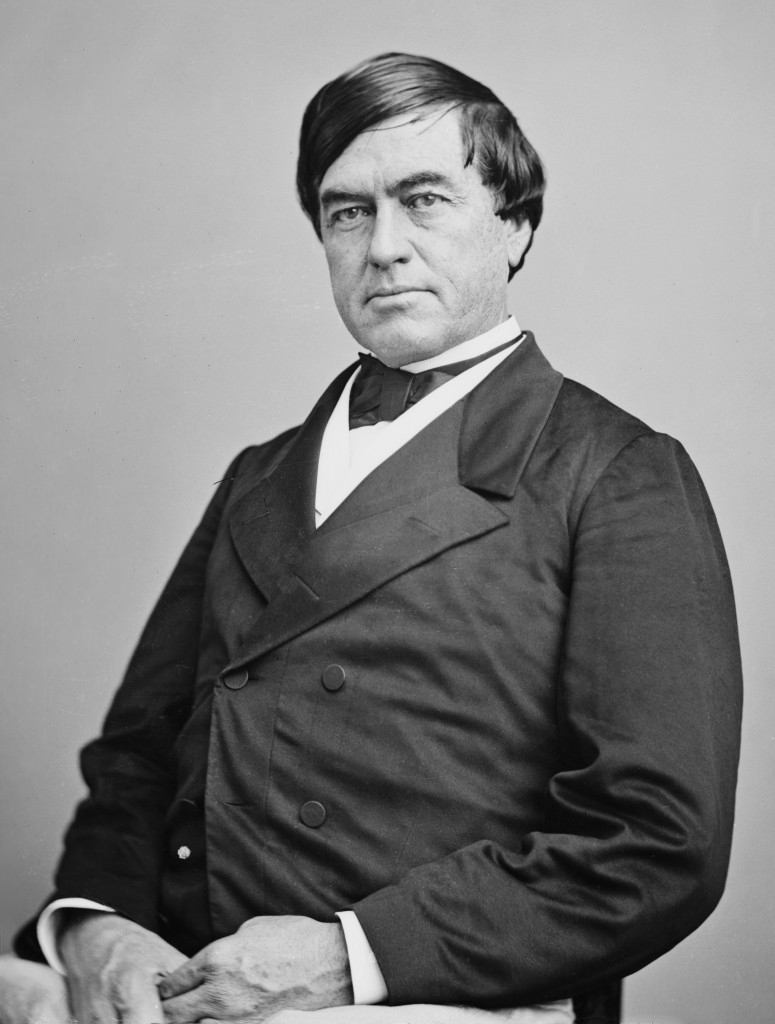
- Portrait c. 1860

United States Ambassador to Russia
- In office May 7, 1863 – October 1, 1869
- President: Abraham Lincoln; Andrew Johnson; Ulysses S. Grant
- Preceded by: Simon Cameron
- Succeeded by: Andrew Gregg Curtin
- In office July 14, 1861 – June 25, 1862
- President: Abraham Lincoln
- Preceded by: John Appleton
- Succeeded by: Simon Cameron

Member of the Kentucky House of Representatives from Madison County
- In office 1835–1841

Personal details
- Born: October 9, 1810 Madison County, Kentucky, U.S.
- Died: July 22, 1903 (aged 92) Madison County, Kentucky, U.S.
- Party: Republican (1854‍–‍1870; 1884‍–‍1903); Liberal Republican (1870‍–‍1872); Democratic (1872‍–‍1884)
- Spouses: Mary Jane Warfield (m. 1833; div. 1878); Dora Richardson (m. 1894; div. 1897)
- Children: 11, including Mary, Brutus, and Laura
- Parent: Green Clay (father)
- Education: Transylvania University; Yale College
- Occupation: Lawyer; politician; farmer; newspaper publisher
- Known for: Abolitionist activism

Military service
- Branch/service: United States Army; U.S. Volunteers
- Years of service: 1846–1847; 1861–1863
- Rank: Major general
- Unit: 1st Kentucky Cavalry; Clay's Washington Guards
- Battles/wars: Mexican–American War; Battle of Buena Vista; American Civil War; Defense of Washington

Cassius Marcellus Clay (October 9, 1810 – July 22, 1903) was an American planter, politician, military officer and abolitionist who served as the United States ambassador to Russia from 1863 to 1869.

Born in Kentucky to a wealthy planter family, Clay entered politics during the 1830s and grew to support the abolitionist cause in the U.S., drawing ire from fellow Southerners. A founding member of the Republican Party in Kentucky, he was appointed by President Abraham Lincoln as the U.S. minister to Russia. Clay is credited with influencing Russian support for the Union during the American Civil War.

== Early life, family, and education ==
Cassius Marcellus Clay was born on October 9, 1810, in Madison County, Kentucky, to Sally Lewis and Green Clay, one of the wealthiest planters and slave owners in Kentucky, who became a prominent politician. He was one of six children who survived to adulthood, of seven born.

Clay was a member of a large and influential Clay political family. His older brother Brutus J. Clay became a politician at the state and federal levels. They were cousins of both Kentucky politician Henry Clay and Alabama governor Clement Comer Clay. Cassius's sister Elizabeth Lewis Clay (1798–1887) married John Speed Smith, who also became a state and US politician. Their son, Green Clay Smith, became a state politician and was elected to Congress.

The younger Clay attended Transylvania University and then graduated from Yale College in 1832. While at Yale, he heard abolitionist William Lloyd Garrison speak, and his lecture inspired Clay to join the anti-slavery movement. Garrison's arguments were to him "as water is to a thirsty wayfarer." Clay was politically incrementalist, supporting gradual legal change rather than calling for immediate abolition the way Garrison and his supporters did. He thought this more likely to bring success.

== Marriage and family ==
On February 26, 1833, Clay married Mary Jane Warfield, daughter of Mary Barr and Dr. Elisha Warfield of Lexington, Kentucky. They had ten children, six of whom lived to adulthood:

- Elisha Warfield Clay (1835–1851)
- Green Clay (1837–1883)
- Mary Barr Clay (Mrs. J. Frank Herrick) (1839–1924)
- Sarah "Sallie" Lewis Clay Bennett (1841–1935)
- Cassius Marcellus Clay Jr. (1843–1843)
- Cassius Marcellus Clay Jr. (1845–1857)
- Brutus Junius Clay II (1847–1932)
- Laura Clay (1849–1941)
- Flora Clay (1851–1851)
- Anne Clay Crenshaw (1859–1945)

Later, he adopted Henry Launey Clay, believed to be his son by an extra-marital relationship while in Russia.

In 1878 after 45 years of marriage, Clay divorced his wife, Mary Jane (Warfield) Clay, claiming abandonment after she no longer would tolerate his marital infidelities.

== Early political career ==
Cassius Clay was a member of the planter class who later became a prominent anti-slavery crusader. Clay worked toward emancipation, both as a Kentucky state representative and as an early member of the Republican Party. Clay "manumitted several (but not all) of his own slaves".

Clay was elected to three terms in the Kentucky House of Representatives, but he lost support among Kentuckian voters as he promoted abolition. His anti-slavery activism earned him violent enemies.

During a political debate in 1843, Clay survived his first assassination attempt by Sam Brown, a hired gunman. Jerking his Bowie knife out for retaliation, Clay happened to pull its silver-tipped scabbard up over his heart. Brown's bullet struck the scabbard and embedded in the silver. Despite having been shot in the chest, Clay rushed Brown with his knife and split Brown's nose in half from top to bottom, left an ear dangling by a thread, and took out one eye, before the men that hired Brown managed to throw him over a tall fence to keep Clay from finishing him off.

In 1845, Clay began publishing an anti-slavery newspaper, True American, in Lexington, Kentucky. Within a month, he received death threats, had to arm himself, and regularly barricaded the armored doors of his newspaper office for protection, besides setting up two four-pounder cannons inside. Shortly afterward, a mob of about 60 men broke into his office and seized his printing equipment. To protect his venture, Clay set up a publication center in Cincinnati, Ohio, a center of abolitionists in the free state, but continued to reside in Kentucky.

Clay served in the Mexican–American War as a captain with the 1st Regiment, Kentucky Mounted Volunteers from 1846 to 1847. He had opposed the annexation of Texas and the expansion of slavery into the Southwest, but had volunteered because of Mexico's attempt to seize Texas, which it claimed as its historic territory.

Clay survived his second assassination attempt while he was in Foxtown, Kentucky on June 15, 1849, after he stabbed 29-year-old farmer and politician Cyril Turner in the stomach following a heated quarrel. Turner succumbed to his injury two days later. The knife that Clay mortally wounded Turner with along with the pants that Turner was wearing in the fight are on display at the Irvinton House Museum in Richmond, Kentucky.

In 1853, Clay granted 10 acres of his expansive lands to John G. Fee, an abolitionist who founded the town of Berea. In 1855 Fee founded Berea College, open to all races. Clay's connections to the northern antislavery movement remained strong. He was a founder of the Republican Party in Kentucky and became a friend of Abraham Lincoln, whom he supported for the presidency in 1860. Clay was briefly a candidate for the vice presidency at the 1860 Republican National Convention, but lost the nomination to Hannibal Hamlin.

== Civil War and Minister to Russia ==
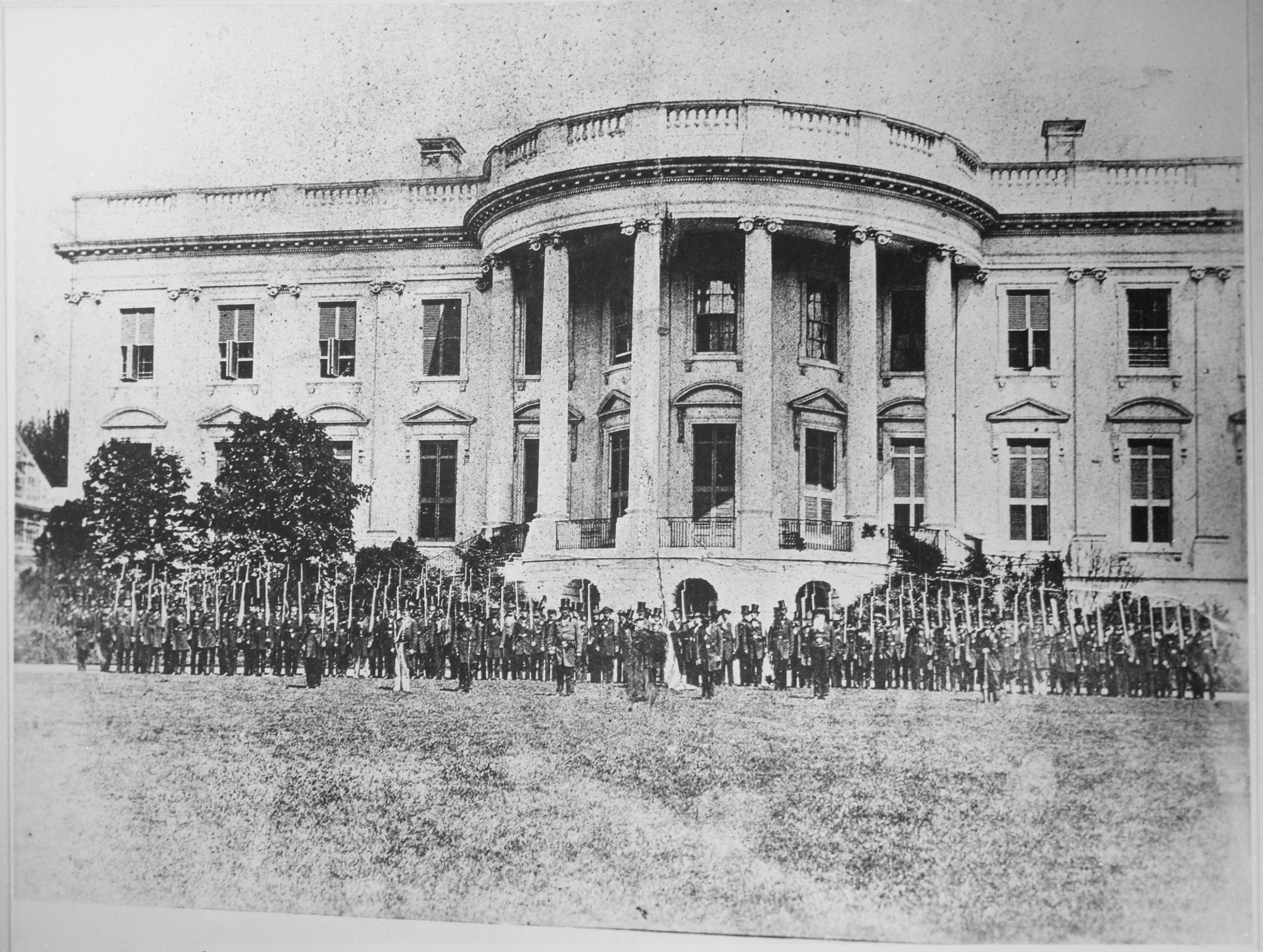
Clay's Battalion in front of the White House, April 1861

President Lincoln appointed Clay to the post of Minister to the Russian court at St. Petersburg on March 28, 1861. The Civil War started before he departed and, as there were no federal troops in Washington at the time, Clay organized a group of 300 volunteers to protect the White House and U.S. Naval Yard from a possible Confederate attack. These men became known as Cassius M. Clay's Washington Guards. President Lincoln gave Clay a presentation Colt revolver in recognition. When federal troops arrived, Clay and his family embarked for Russia. As Minister to Russia, Clay witnessed the Tsar's emancipation edict.

During the Civil War, Russia came to the aid of the Union, threatening war against Britain and France if they officially recognized the Confederacy. Cassius Clay, as minister to Russia during that time, was instrumental in securing Russia's aid. Emperor Alexander II of Russia gave sealed orders to the commanders of both his Atlantic and Pacific fleets, and sent them to the East and West coasts of the United States. They were instructed that the sealed orders were to be opened only if Britain and France entered the war on the side of the Confederacy. When the Russian Atlantic fleet entered New York harbor, Secretary of the Navy Gideon Welles wrote in his diary:

In sending these ships to this country, there is something significant. What will be its effect on France, and French policy, we shall learn in due time. It may be moderate, it may exacerbate. God bless the Russians.

The action of Alexander II was confirmed in 1904 by Wharton Barker of Pennsylvania, who in 1878 was the financial agent in the United States of the Russian government.

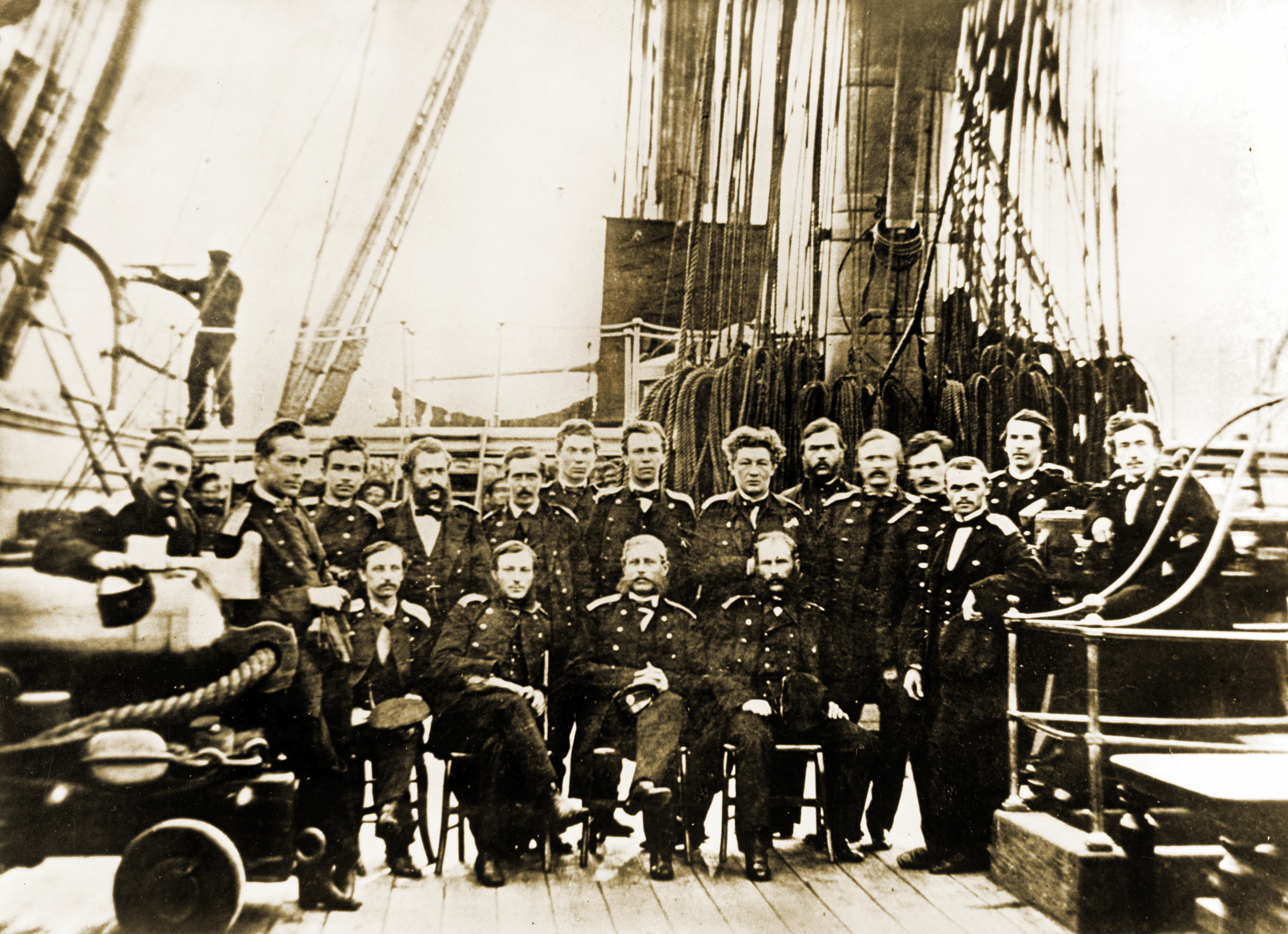
Russian frigate visits Boston, 1863

Recalled to the United States in 1862 to accept a commission from Lincoln as a major general with the Union Army, Clay publicly refused to accept it unless Lincoln would agree to emancipate slaves under Confederate control. Clay was nonetheless commissioned a Major General of the US Volunteers General Staff on April 11, 1862, and Lincoln sent him to Kentucky to assess the mood for emancipation there and in the other border states. Following Clay's return to Washington, D.C., Lincoln issued the Emancipation Proclamation in late 1862, to take effect in January 1863.

Clay resigned his commission on March 11, 1863, and returned to Russia, where he served until 1869. For his service in the Civil War, Clay received a pension noting his service as a Major General of Volunteers, as well as his service in the Mexican–American War. He was influential in the negotiations for the purchase of Alaska.

According to historians, Clay retained some of his slaves for many years through the end of the American Civil War and passage of the Thirteenth Amendment.

== Later years ==
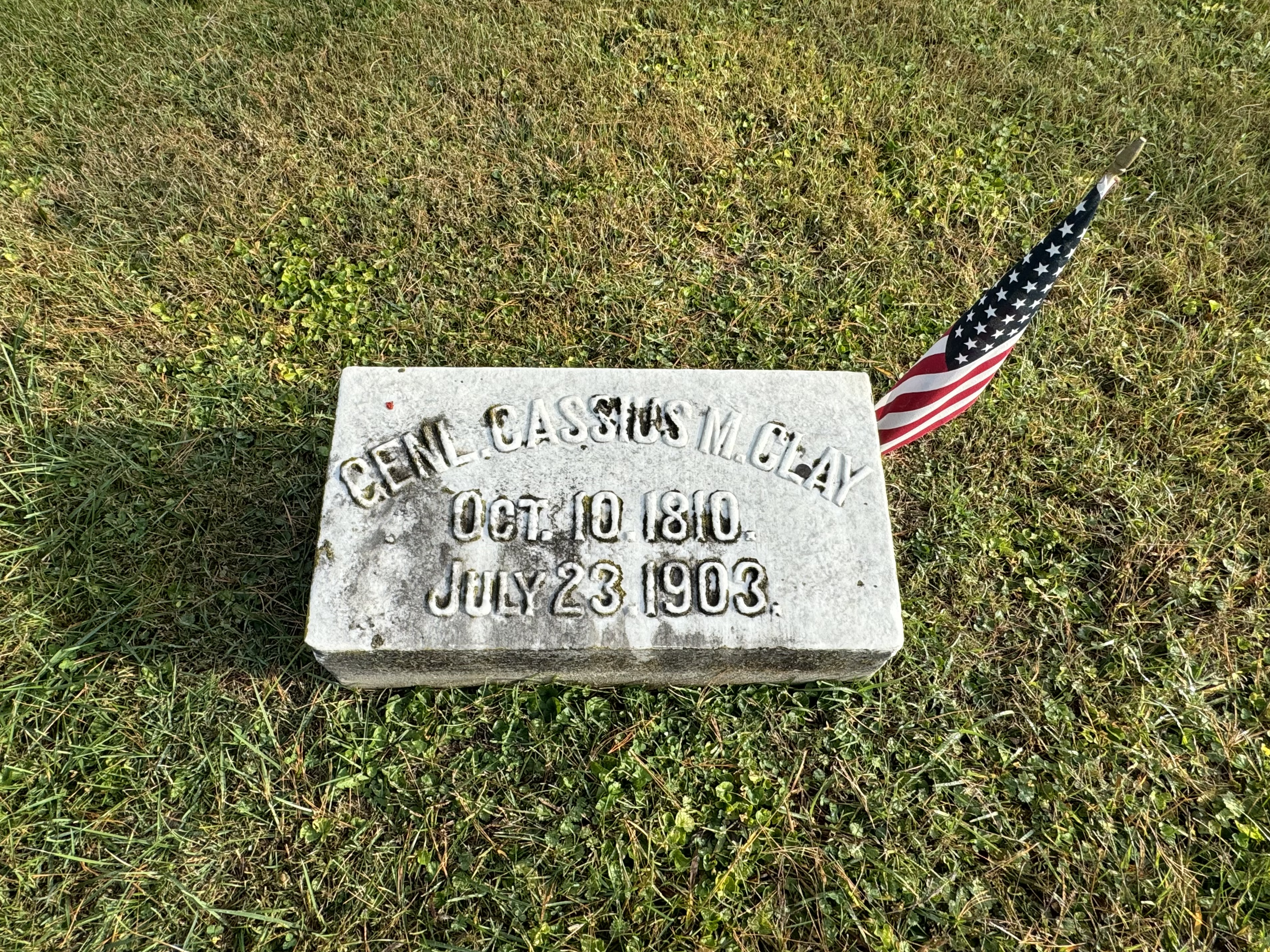
Clay's gravesite at Richmond Cemetery in Richmond, Kentucky

Later, Clay founded the Cuban Charitable Aid Society to help the Cuban independence movement of José Martí. He also spoke in favor of nationalizing the railroads and later against the power being accrued by industrialists. Clay left the Republican Party in 1869. He also disapproved of the Republican Radicals' reconstruction policy after Lincoln's assassination.

In 1872, Clay was one of the organizers of the Liberal Republican revolt. He was instrumental in securing the nomination of Horace Greeley for the presidency. In the political campaigns of 1876 and 1880, Clay supported the Democratic Party candidates. He rejoined the Republican Party in the campaign of 1884. At the 1890 Kentucky Constitutional Convention, Clay was elected by the members as the Convention's president.

Clay had a reputation as a rebel and a fighter. Due to threats on his life, he had become accustomed to carrying two pistols and a knife for protection. He installed a cannon to protect his home and office. Cassius Clay died at his home on July 22, 1903, of "general exhaustion." He was 92 years old. Survivors included his daughters, Laura Clay and Mary Barr Clay, who were both women's rights activists.

== Legacy ==
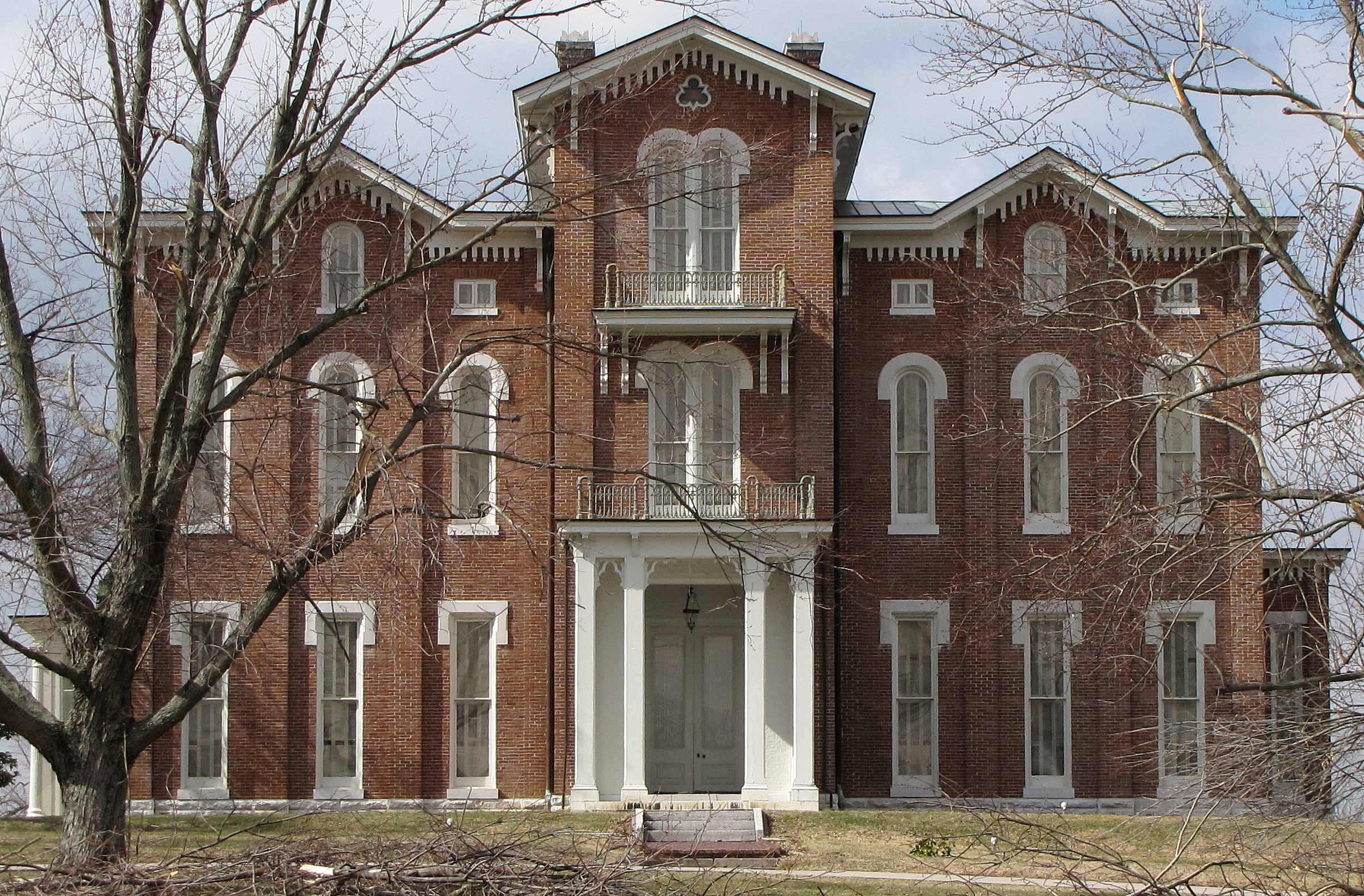
White Hall

His family home, White Hall, is maintained by the Commonwealth of Kentucky as White Hall State Historic Site.

In 1912, Herman Heaton Clay, a descendant of an African-American slave owned by Henry Clay, named his son Cassius Marcellus Clay in tribute to the abolitionist, who had died nine years earlier. This Cassius Clay gave the same name to his son, Cassius Marcellus Clay Jr., who became an internationally renowned world heavyweight champion boxer. He changed his name to Muhammad Ali in 1964 upon converting to Islam and joining the Nation of Islam, as he considered his earlier name a "slave name", adding that "I didn't choose it and I don't want it." He further asserted in his autobiography that "he may have gotten rid of his slaves, 'but (he) held on to white supremacy'". This led Ali to conclude: "Why should I keep my white slavemaster's name visible and my black ancestors invisible, unknown, unhonored?" However, historians generally regard Clay as one of the most radical and principled Southern opponents of slavery, whose lifelong advocacy for emancipation and interracial education distinguished him even when compared to Northern abolitionists.

== Writings ==
- Clay, Cassius Marcellus (1886). The Life, Memoirs. Writings, and Speeches of Cassius Marcellus Clay showing his Conduct in Overthrow of American Slavery, the Salvation of the Union and the Restoration of the Autonomy of the States. Cincinnati, Ohio: J. Fletcher Brennan & Co – via Internet Archive.
- The Writings of Cassius Marcellus Clay (edited with a memoir by Horace Greeley. New York, 1848)

== See also ==
- Clay family
- Lucy Walker steamboat disaster

Diplomatic posts
Preceded by John Appleton	United States Ambassador to Russia; March 28, 1861 – June 25, 1862	Succeeded by Simon Cameron
Preceded by Simon Cameron	United States Ambassador to Russia; March 11, 1863 – October 1, 1869	Succeeded by Andrew Gregg Curtin
