= Blissfield, Ohio =

Unincorporated community in Ohio, U.S.

Coordinates: 40°23′59″N 81°57′56″W

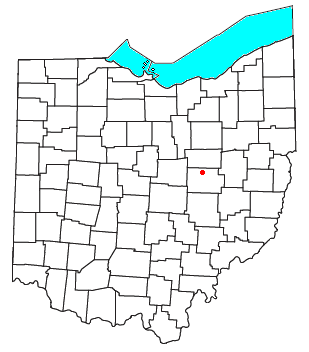
Location of Blissfield, Ohio

Blissfield is an unincorporated community in southwestern Clark Township, Coshocton County, Ohio, United States. It has a post office with the ZIP code 43805. It lies along State Route 60 between Warsaw and Killbuck.

== History ==
Blissfield was laid out in 1890 when the railroad was extended to that point. The community derives its name from Bliss, a grandson of one Abram Weatherwax. A post office was established at Blissfield in 1889 and remained in operation until 2002.
