= Mary Barr Clay =

American suffragist leader (1839–1924)

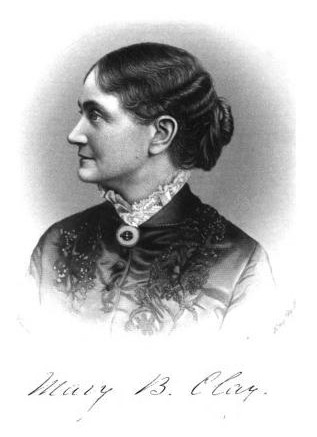
- Mary Barr Clay, photo from Elizabeth Cady Stanton, et al, eds. "History of Woman Suffrage, Vol. III," 1886: 816
- Born: October 13, 1839; Lexington, Kentucky, U.S.
- Died: October 12, 1924 (aged 84); Richmond, Kentucky, U.S.
- Burial place: Lexington Cemetery
- Occupations: Suffragist; farmer
- Known for: Women's suffrage advocacy
- Spouse: John Francis Herrick (m. 1866; div. 1872)
- Parents: Cassius Marcellus Clay; Mary Jane Warfield Clay
- Relatives: Laura Clay (sister); Brutus J. Clay II (brother)

Mary Barr Clay (October 13, 1839 – October 12, 1924) was a leader of the American women's suffrage movement. She also was known as Mary B. Clay and Mrs. J. Frank Herrick.

== Family background ==
The elder daughter of Cassius Marcellus Clay and his wife Mary Jane Warfield, Mary Barr Clay was born on October 13, 1839, in Lexington, Kentucky. Clay married John Francis "Frank" Herrick, of Cleveland, Ohio, on October 3, 1866. The couple had three sons: Cassius Clay Herrick (July 17, 1867 – March 1935); Francis Warfield (February 9, 1869 – May 16, 1919); and Green (August 11, 1871 – 10 Jan 1962). The couple divorced in 1872. After divorce she dropped the Herrick surname and took back her surname of Clay. She also changed the last names of her two youngest sons to Clay.

In 1878, Clay's parents divorced after more than 40 years of marriage. Her mother Mary Jane Warfield Clay was left homeless after she had managed White Hall, the family estate, for 45 years. This inequality in property rights galvanized Clay into joining the women's rights movement. She soon brought her three younger sisters with her. Laura Clay, the youngest, also became very active in the movement.

== Public career ==
In May 1879, Mary B. Clay went to St. Louis, Missouri to attend the tenth anniversary of the National Woman Suffrage Association. She soon became a Kentucky delegate for that organization, serving as a vice-president. She was already a Vice President for the American Woman Suffrage Association. There she met Susan B. Anthony and arranged for the suffrage leader to speak in Richmond, Kentucky. Returning home she organized the Fayette County Equal Suffrage Association in 1879. The next year, she created the Madison County Equal Rights Association. While living in Ann Arbor, Michigan, to educate her two younger sons, she organized a suffrage club there. She became president pro tem of the convention in Flint for the Michigan State Suffrage Association. She also edited a column in the Ann Arbor "Register and spoke before the senior law class of the University of Michigan on the "Constitutional Right of Women to Vote." She submitted the Kentucky report in Volume 3 of the History of Woman Suffrage: 1876–1885.

Clay became the first Kentuckian to hold the office of president in a national woman's organization when she was elected president of the American Woman Suffrage Association in 1883. Mary B. Clay was also the first Kentucky woman to speak publicly on women's rights.

She corresponded with Susan B. Anthony, Lucy Stone, Alice Stone Blackwell and other leading suffragists. She is credited with drawing her younger sister Laura Clay into the women's rights movement. The younger Clay became better known in history as a women's rights advocate.

== Death ==
Her public life largely ended in 1902, as she dealt with ill health and family obligations. Clay died on October 12, 1924, one day shy of her 85th birthday, and is interred at Lexington Cemetery.

== See also ==
- Clay family
- American Woman Suffrage Association
- National Woman Suffrage Association
- Kentucky Equal Rights Association
- National American Woman Suffrage Association
