= Brutus J. Clay II =

American businessman, political figure and diplomat

United States Minister to Switzerland
- In office July 1, 1905 – March 1, 1910
- President: Theodore Roosevelt
- Preceded by: David Jayne Hill
- Succeeded by: Laurits S. Swenson

Personal details
- Born: Brutus Junius Clay II; February 20, 1847 Madison, Kentucky, U.S.
- Died: June 2, 1932 (aged 85) Richmond, Kentucky, U.S.
- Party: Republican
- Spouses: Pattie Amelia Field (m. 1872; died 1891); Lalla Rookh Fish Marsteller (m. 1895)
- Parents: Cassius Marcellus Clay; Mary Jane Warfield Clay
- Relatives: Mary Barr Clay (sister); Laura Clay (sister)
- Education: University of Michigan

Brutus Junius Clay II (February 20, 1847 – June 2, 1932) was an American businessman, political figure and diplomat.

== Biography ==
The son of Cassius M. Clay and Mary Jane Warfield Clay, Brutus Junius Clay II was born in Madison County, Kentucky, on February 20, 1847. He received a civil engineering degree from the University of Michigan in 1868, and worked as a wholesale and retail grocer. He lived at a Richmond, Kentucky home he called Linwood, and was also the owner and operator of lumber mills, stone, kaolin and potters clay quarries, gas and oil wells, and other businesses. In addition, he owned farms in Illinois and Kentucky, and a Mississippi cotton plantation.

Active in politics as a Republican, In 1897 he was offered appointment as Minister to Argentina by President William McKinley, but declined. In 1900 he was a U.S. Commissioner at the Paris Exposition. In 1904 he was a Delegate to the Republican National Convention.

In 1905 he was appointed Minister to Switzerland, serving until 1910.

Clay died in Richmond, Kentucky, on June 2, 1932.

== Family ==
Brutus J. Clay II was married twice. On February 20, 1872, he married Pattie Amelia Field (1848–1891). On January 15, 1895, he married Lalla R. Fish Marsteller (1860–1942).

With his first wife, Clay's surviving children included:

Belle Lyman Clay, b. November 4, 1872

Christopher Field Clay, b. December 19, 1874

Orville Martin Clay, b. May 7, 1879

Mary Warfield Clay, b. September 26, 1882

Charlotte Elizabeth Clay, b. May 31, 1889

He had no children with his second wife, but treated his Stepson as his own.

William Fish Marsteller, b. December 11, 1885

His other family relationships included: nephew of Brutus Junius Clay; grandson of Green Clay; grandnephew of Matthew Clay (1754–1815); second cousin once removed of Henry Clay; third cousin of James Brown Clay; third cousin once removed of Clement Comer Clay; and fourth cousin of Clement Claiborne Clay.

== Other ==
In 1892 Clay donated a home in memory of his wife to be used in founding Richmond's first hospital. The Pattie A. Clay Infirmary, later the Pattie A. Clay Hospital, relocated several times and is now part of Baptist Health Richmond.

Clay's home, now known as the Brutus and Pattie Field Clay House, is on the National Register of Historic Places.

Diplomatic posts
Preceded by David Jayne Hill	U.S. Minister to Switzerland; 1905–1910	Succeeded by Laurits S. Swenson
