= List of Kentucky suffragists =

This is a list of Kentucky suffragists, suffrage groups and others associated with the cause of women's suffrage in Kentucky.

== Groups ==
- Anderson County Woman's Suffrage League, created in 1913.
- Collegiate Equal Suffrage League.
- Columbus Equal Rights Association, founded in 1897.
- Covington Colored Organization, formed in 1895.
- Fayette County Equal Rights Association, created in January 1888.
- Hopkins County Equal Rights Association.
- Kentucky Equal Rights Association, formed on November 22, 1888.
- Kentucky Federation of Women's Clubs.
- Kentucky Woman Suffrage Association (KWSA).
- Kenton County Equal Rights Association.
- Laurel County Equal Rights Association.
- Louisville Equal Rights Association (LERA), formed in 1889, later changed name to the Woman Suffrage Association of Louisville in 1908.
- Madison County Equal Rights Association.
- The Men's League.
- National Association of Colored Women's Clubs.
- Woman's Christian Temperance Union.

== Suffragists ==
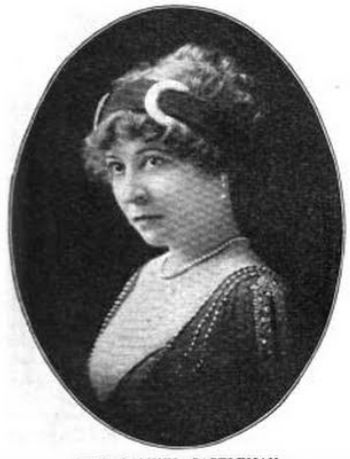
Margaret Weissinger Castleman

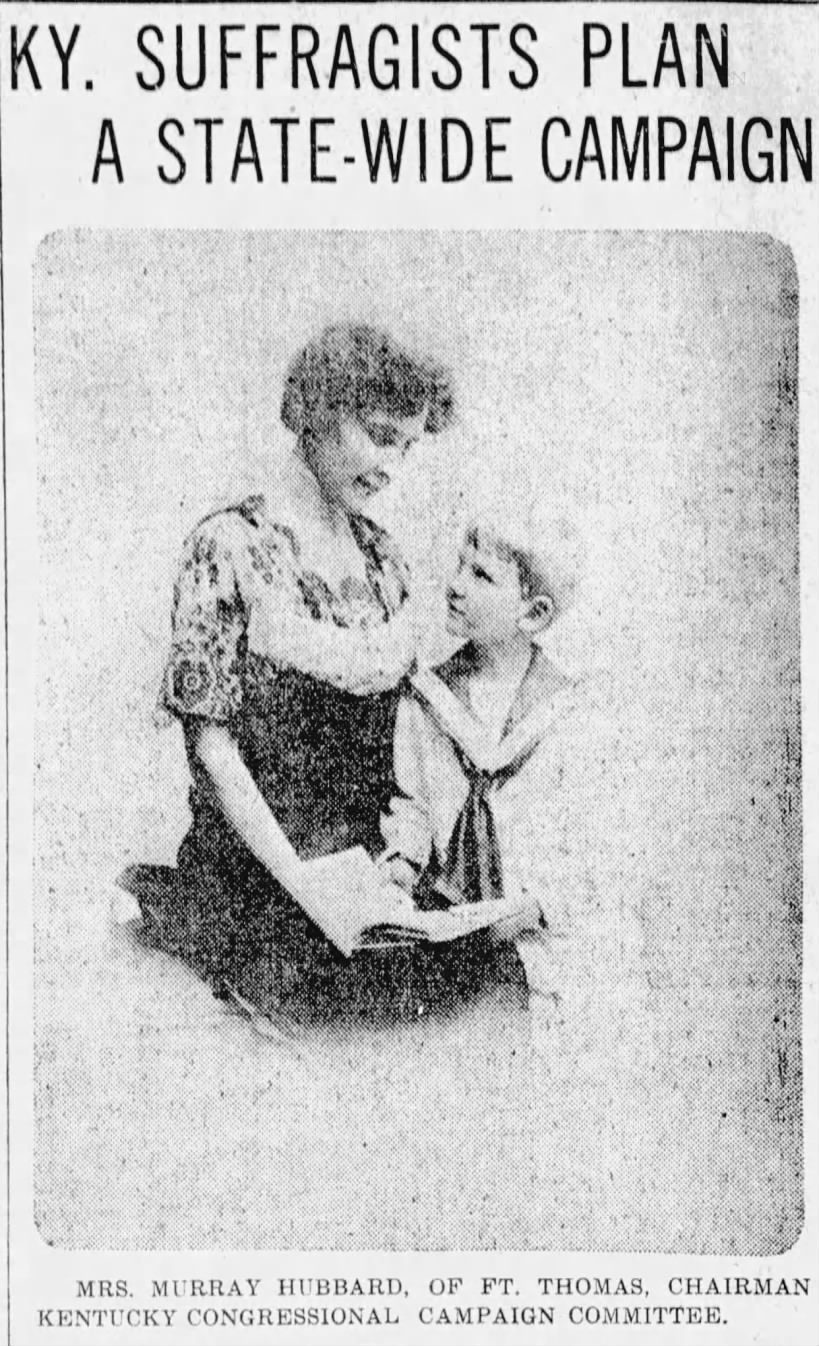
Marian Hord Hubbard and son, October 1915

- Susan Look Avery (Louisville).
- Lizzie Bates (Louisville).
- Frances Estill Beauchamp (1860–1923) – Kentucky temperance activist, social reformer, lecturer, suffragist.
- Cornelia Beach (Louisville).
- Sarah "Sallie" Clay Bennett.
- Madeline McDowell Breckinridge (1872–1920) – suffrage leader, one-time vice president of the National Woman Suffrage Association, one of Kentucky's leading Progressive reformers (Lexington).
- Sophonisba Breckinridge (1866–1948) – activist, Progressive Era social reformer, social scientist and innovator in higher education (Lexington).
- Mary E. Britton (Lexington).
- Nannie Helen Burroughs (Louisville).
- Sylvia Butcher (Louisville).
- Alice Barbee Castleman (Louisville).
- Margaret Weissinger Castleman (Louisville).
- Laura Clay (Lexington).
- Mary Barr Clay (Richmond).
- Sarah A. Corrington (Nicholasville).
- Alice Crutcher (Louisville).
- Cora De Sha Barnett (Louisville).
- Ellen Battelle Dietrick.
- Emma Dolfinger (Louisville).
- Eugenia B. Farmer (Covington).
- John G. Fee.
- Mary Elliott Flanery.
- Jennie Maas Flexner (Louisville).
- Lucy Flint (Louisville).
- Jessica Firth (Covington).
- Bettiola Heloise Fortson (Hopkinsville).
- Lucretia Gibson (Louisville).
- Fannie Givens (Louisville).
- Eliza Calvert Hall (pen name of Eliza Caroline "Lida" Calvert Obenchain) (1856–1935) – author, women's rights advocate.
- Hattie Harris (Louisville).
- Rachel Davis Harris (Louisville).
- Ida Withers Harrison (Lexington).
- Josephine Henry (Versailles).
- Marian Hord Hubbard.
- Sarah Gibson Humphreys (1830–1907) – author, suffragist.
- Jessie Leigh Hutchinson (Lexington).
- Rebecca Rosenthal Judah (Louisville).
- Eliza Kellar (Louisville).
- Dorothy Koger (Paducah).
- Katherine G. Langley (Pikeville).
- Mary Lafon (Louisville).
- Maudellen Lanier (Louisville).
- Caroline Leech (Louisville).
- Eleanor Tarrant Little (Louisville).
- Essie Mack (Louisville).
- Patsie Sloan Martin (Louisville).
- Angell Mengel (Louisville).
- Georgia Moore (Louisville).
- Georgia Nugent (Louisville).
- Eliza Calvert Obenchain (Bowling Green).
- Mary Virginia Cook Parrish (Louisville).
- Virginia Penny (Louisville).
- Josephine Fowler Post (Paducah).
- Eugenia Dunlap Potts.
- Mary Creegan Roark (Lexington).
- Ella Robinson (Louisville).
- Virginia Pollard Robinson (Louisville).
- Sarah Hardin Sawyer.
- Patty Blackburn Semple (Louisville).
- Isabella H. Shepard (Frankfort).
- Lucy Wilmot Smith (Louisville).
- Lavinia B. Sneed (Louisville).
- Louise Southgate (Covington).
- Ida Stanley (Arlington).
- Mamie Steward (Louisville).
- Christine Bradley South.
- Ellen Taylor (Louisville).
- Mary Florence Taney (Newport).
- Carolyn Verhoeff (Louisville).
- Mary Verhoeff (Louisville).
- John H. Ward (Louisville).
- Mary Fitzbutler Waring (Louisville).
- Martha Webster (Louisville).
- Bertha Whedbee (Louisville).
- Alice D. White (Louisville).
- Harvey W. Wiley.
- Artishia Gilbert-Wilkerson (Louisville).
- Emma Woerner.

== Politicians supporting women's suffrage ==
- William Lindsay.
- Edwin P. Morrow.

== Suffragists campaigning in Kentucky ==
- Jane Addams.
- Susan B. Anthony.
- Carrie Chapman Catt.
- Emma Smith DeVoe.
- Max Eastman.
- William H. Fineshriber.
- Margaret Foley.
- Mary Garrett Hay.
- Lucretia Mott.
- Emmeline Pankhurst.
- Emmeline Pethick-Lawrence.
- Rosika Schwimmer.
- Anna Howard Shaw.
- Ethel Snowden.
- Elizabeth Cady Stanton.
- Lucy Stone.
- Frances Woods.

== Anti-suffragists ==
- Henry Watterson.
- Augustus E. Willson.
- Clarence Woods.

== See also ==
- List of suffragists and suffragettes
- Timeline of women's suffrage in Kentucky
- Women's suffrage in Kentucky
- Women's suffrage in the United States
- Women's suffrage in states of the United States
