= Women's suffrage in Kentucky =

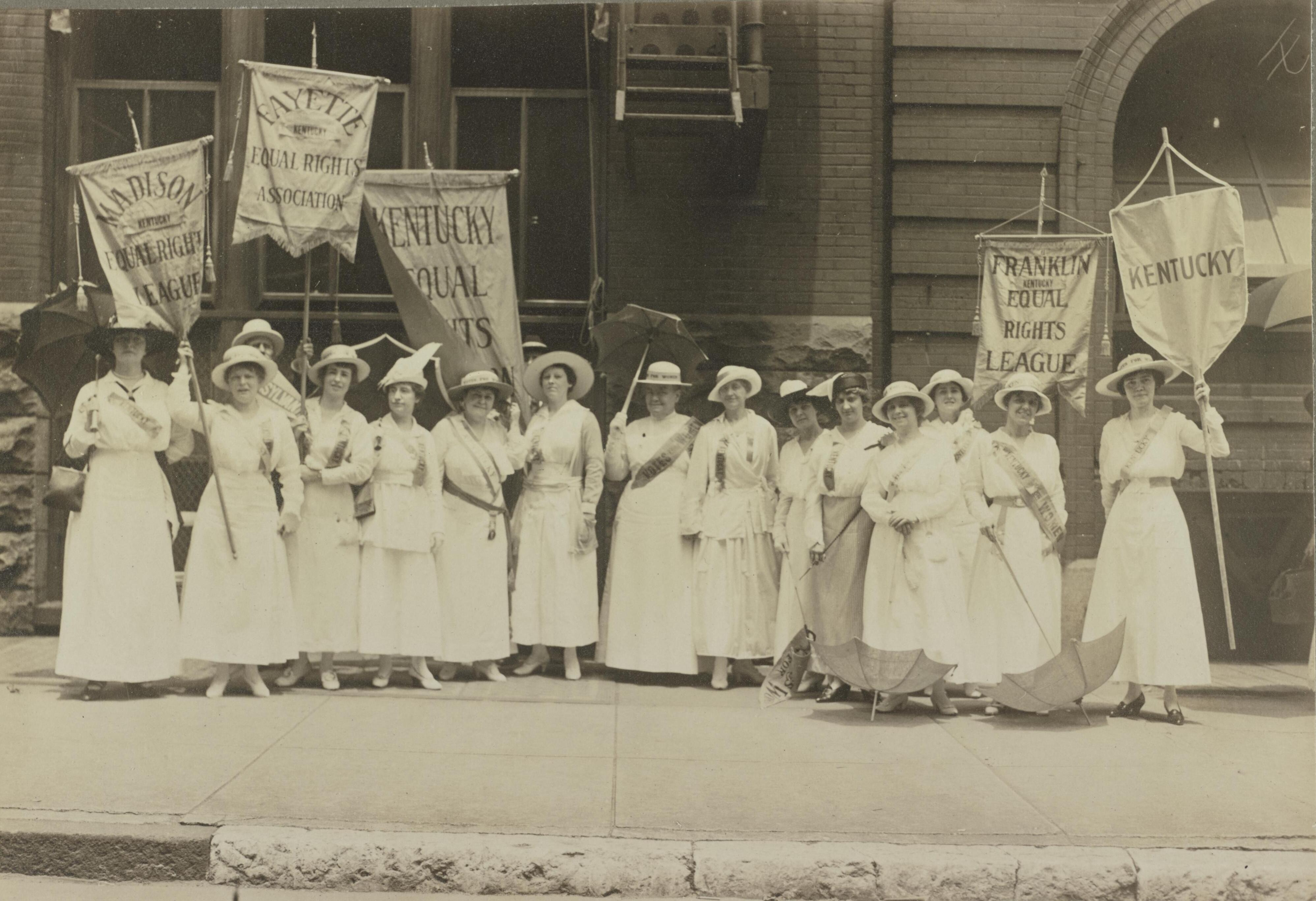
Laura Clay and group marching for the Madison, Fayette, and Franklin Kentucky Equal Rights Association, at Democratic National Convention in St. Louis c. 1916

Women in Kentucky were among the first women in the United States to have a limited right to vote, starting in 1838. Women's rights speakers began to come to the state in the 1850s and by the 1870s some equal suffrage groups had been formed. African American voters were often disenfranchised in Kentucky. When Black women turned out in large numbers to vote in school elections in 1902, white politicians quickly took the vote away from all women in the state. After this, Kentucky suffragists continued to advocate for women's suffrage in various ways: lobbying, raising awareness, and protests.

The Clay family, especially Mary Barr Clay and Laura Clay were prominent suffrage activists in the state. Laura Clay especially championed state suffrage efforts over the federal amendment. As a national suffrage leaders, she was also vocal about suffrage strategies meant to target Southern states.

== Early efforts ==
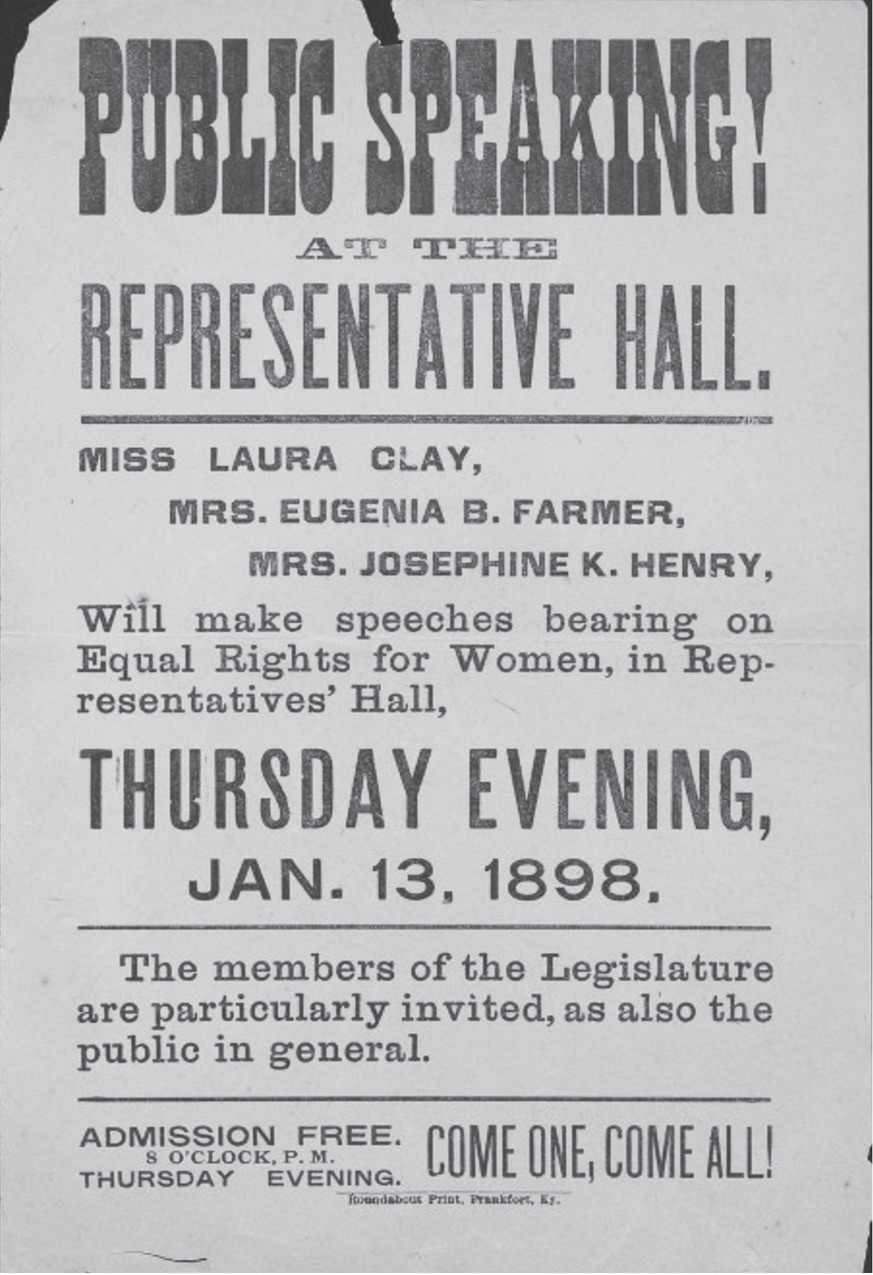
"Public Speaking" Laura Clay, Eugenia B. Farmer, Josephine K. Henry January 13, 1898

In some parts of rural Kentucky in 1838, eligible women earned the right to vote on issues relating to taxes and education. This law, which was very limited in scope and did not allow women from Lexington, Louisville, and Maysville to vote, was nevertheless the first statewide law for women's suffrage passed in the United States since women in New Jersey lost their right to vote in 1807. This law created a legal precedent that suffragists called "the Kentucky law."

In the fall of 1853, two of the first Northern activists for women's rights visited the state. In October, Lucretia Mott addressed people in Maysville. The next month in November, Lucy Stone visited Louisville and spoke to full halls on the issue of women's rights. Her speeches on women's issues kept the topics appropriately conservative in deference to her audience. Mott and Stone were some of the first activists to start working on women's suffrage in Kentucky. Both speakers demonstrated through their efforts that Kentucky women were interested in women's rights.

In October 1879, Susan B. Anthony spoke in Richmond. This visit helped establish a strong connection between the suffragists in the Clay family and led to the founding of the Madison County Equal Rights Association, which was the first permanent women's rights group started in Kentucky. Several members of the Clay family became very active in working towards women's suffrage around this time. Both Sarah "Sallie" Clay Bennett and Annie Clay wrote women's rights articles for the Richmond Register and the Kentucky Gazette respectively.

Mary Barr Clay and Bennett attended the National Woman Suffrage Association (NWSA) convention held in Chicago in 1880, where Bennett spoke to a large group. Mary Clay later became the president of American Woman Suffrage Association (AWSA) where she advocated for suffrage efforts in the South.

In 1881, the first national suffrage convention held south of the Ohio River took place in Louisville. The Association for the Advancement of Women (AAW) held its annual meeting in Louisville in October where Laura Clay brought up women's suffrage, the first time the group had tackled the topic publicly. The American Woman Suffrage Association (AWSA) convention held there was well attended with a mixed group of suffragists. After the convention, the first state-wide suffrage group in the South, the Kentucky Woman Suffrage Association (KWSA) was formed. Laura Clay served as the first president with Colonel John H. Ward as vice president. This group was active until 1888.

Later, Laura Clay became the president of the Fayette County Equal Rights Association (FCERA) which was formed in 1888. FCERA absorbed members of KWSA and began lobbying the state legislature in Frankfort. When the state held a constitutional convention in 1890 and 1891, Bennett, Laura Clay, Eugenia B. Farmer, Josephine Henry, and Isabella H. Shepard traveled to Frankfort to lobby the convention delegates. Their legislative work led to the creation of a special Committee on Woman's Rights. Bennett, Clay, and Shepard addressed an audience of interested convention delegates on October 9. Henry spoke in front of the Woman's Rights Committee and later the Committee on Elections when the lobbyists returned to Frankfort on December 8.

In 1889, the Louisville Equal Rights Association (LERA) was formed and by 1895, had thirty-one members. During the 1890s, LERA pursued a campaign of reform related to women's property rights. Working on these changes "altered public opinion so that more dramatic changes, including suffrage, became accepted."

When the state held a constitutional convention to update the Constitution of Kentucky in 1890, suffragists were hoping that they could influence delegates to allow women's suffrage in the state. A committee of lobbyists from KERA were sent to Frankfort to influence the convention. These women had a broad scope that not only covered women's suffrage, but tackled other women's rights issues, such as women's right to own property. The National American Woman Suffrage Association (NAWSA) provided support for these efforts. Unfortunately, the lobbyists were unsuccessful in securing voting rights for women at this time through the state convention. These discussions taking place about women's suffrage eventually led to an option for the state legislature to rule on school suffrage issues at a later date. This successfully lead to the state legislature allowing women to vote in school issues in three cities in 1894.

Women in Kentucky used some of their political power to put pressure on the 1894 reelection campaign of politician, William Campbell Preston Breckinridge. The Kentucky Equal Rights Association took a lead in organizing the successful opposition to Breckinridge's candidacy. Clay believed that this campaign against his reelection helped women earn the respect of Kentucky politicians.

Covington, Lexington, and Newport each passed school-suffrage measures for women in 1894. Later, there was racist and sexist controversy surrounding this law. In 1901, more African American women registered to vote than white women. They were also more likely to register as Republicans. This was a problem for the white, Democratic politicians in Kentucky who wanted to keep their power base intact. Kentucky legislators claimed that women didn't really "want" to vote. In response to these controversies, two Kentucky politicians put up legislation to repeal women's limited right to vote. Laura Clay and other suffragists and community leaders immediately protested the bill. The Woman's Christian Temperance Union (WCTU) in Kentucky created a Committee on Retention of School Suffrage for Women. But despite suffragist's efforts, in 1902, the state repealed the right to vote in these cities.

=== The Kentucky Plan ===
Laura Clay, who was heavily involved with NAWSA, had been urging the group to create a strategy to work on women's suffrage in the South. In 1892, NAWSA created a "Southern Committee with Clay as the head. This committee represented suffragists from Alabama, Arkansas, Georgia, Kentucky, Louisiana, Maryland, Missouri, Tennessee, and Texas. In 1896, Clay urged NAWSA to adopt the "Kentucky Plan." This plan was a change to the organization's charter which allowed relaxed rules on meeting attendance and membership dues. Clay hoped that this change in the rules would make it easier for women to join.

== Continuing efforts ==
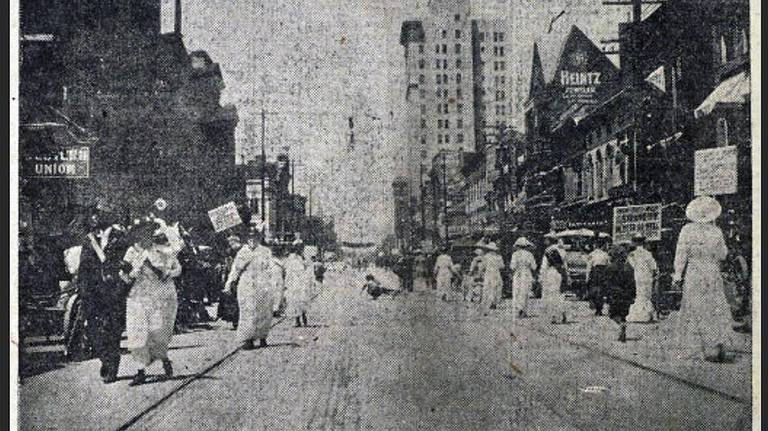
Suffragists march in Lexington, Kentucky on May 6, 1916

Around this time, it was difficult to keep women involved in suffrage work in Kentucky. One reason was that women faced harsh ridicule for advocating for women's suffrage. Nevertheless, despite the repeal of women's voting rights in school elections in 1902, women continued to pursue the restoration of previous voting rights. Activists continued to advocate for school suffrage in the state, though the work was largely continued by suffrage allies rather than dedicated state suffrage groups like KERA. The Kentucky State Federation of Women's Clubs was one of the groups that picked up the advocacy for women's right to vote in school issues.

Anna Howard Shaw attended the state suffrage convention in Louisville in 1909. During her visit, she spoke to working-class women who worked in the textile mills about women's suffrage. In October 1911, NAWSA held their annual convention in Louisville. Virginia Pollard Robinson worked on the programming for the event and invited Emmeline Pankhurst to serve as the Keynote speaker.

Over the next years, various small gains were made. One of the first times women's suffrage activists and themes appeared in a Kentucky parade was in 1912 when activists entered a float in a Louisville parade. From 1912 to 1913, the membership in the KERA almost doubled and represented 21 counties in the state. The state legislature considered allowing women to vote in primary elections for county school supervisors in 1914, though it eventually didn't pass.

Marian Hord Hubbard, who was involved in the Kentucky Federation of Woman's Clubs (KFWC), lobbied organizations and political parties to support women's right to vote in the state. The Kentucky state Republican party added an endorsement for women's suffrage to their platform in 1915. Republicans in the state legislature also caucused to support women's suffrage in the 1916 legislative session. Madeline McDowell Breckinridge and Hubbard lobbied the legislature. While there was a majority of support for women's suffrage in that year's session, the legislature wasn't able to get the bill out of the state House committee. In 1916, both state Republicans and Progressive parties endorsed women's suffrage.

Kentucky suffragists became involved in war work supporting soldiers in World War I starting around 1917. Money was raised for overseas hospitals and an ambulance was purchased and named in honor of Laura Clay.

Kentucky suffragists participated in protests sponsored by the National Woman's Party (NWP). Cornelia Beach of Kentucky was arrested in August 1917 for picketing. In 1919, the KERA publicly came out against picket lines and other radical tactics of some suffragists.

In February 1919, KERA came out in full support of the Nineteenth Amendment. In June 1919, Laura Clay left KERA because she did not support a federal amendment for women's suffrage. Clay and others who left KERA created a group called the Citizens' Committee for a State Suffrage Amendment. Members of the Citizens' Committee believed that a Federal suffrage amendment would take away power from the state. Many white suffragists were also worried that a "federal amendment might invalidate the various laws that southern states had put in place to keep black voters away from the polls." This small group campaigned against the Nineteenth Amendment.

Despite these efforts by Clay, Kentucky suffragists decided to support the ratification of the Nineteenth Amendment. Both the Democratic and Republican parties in the state were in favor of women's suffrage by this time. Kentucky was the twenty-fourth state to ratify the amendment.

Once the Nineteenth Amendment passed, a high percentage of Kentucky women came out to vote in 1920.

== African-American women's suffrage in Kentucky ==
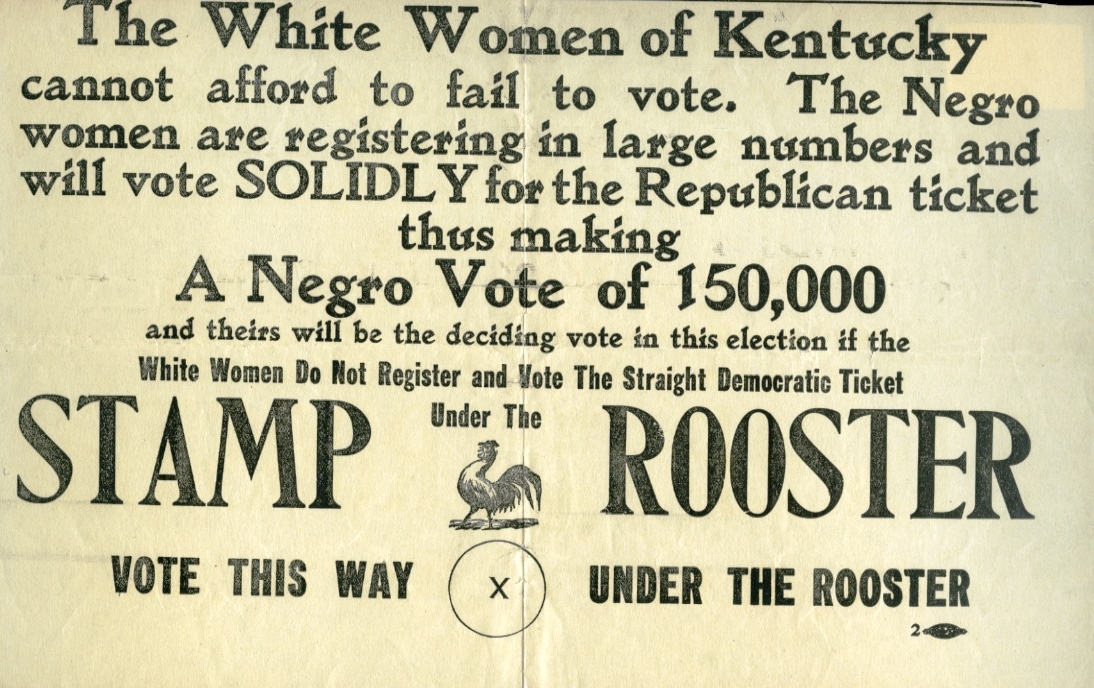
Broadside flier against the African American vote.

Women's suffrage efforts in Kentucky, like much of the American South, were segregated. African Americans in Kentucky started a Black Convention in March 1866 in Lexington in order to discuss the rights of Black Americans. In 1867 on July 4, Black women organized a barbecue which included speeches in favor of Black suffrage.

When women in Kentucky had the right to vote in school elections, many Black women voted for the first time in 1895. In Lexington, Black women turned out in large numbers to vote in 1895. Eugenia Farmer worked to get out the vote among both white and Black women in Covington. Farmer also encouraged Black women to form their own suffrage groups and eventually the short-lived Covington Colored Organization was formed. This group was the first and only African American equal rights associations in the state.

In 1901, the Black community in Lexington used their right to vote to challenge the conservative Democratic Party rule that upheld segregation. During this election, an "unprecedented" number of Black women registered to vote, with all but three precincts showing more Black women than white women registered to vote. This high turnout of Black women voter registrants was a problem for racist leaders in the community. One paper, the Morning Democrat, wrote that women's suffrage should be ended if Black women were voting in larger numbers than white women. On voting day, many women voters had trouble voting because of Democratic interference at the polling areas. In 1902, the state legislature removed the limited rights of women to vote in school-related issues because politicians were worried about African American women voting for Republican candidates for school boards. After this reversal, suffragists campaigned for "school suffrage with an educational qualification" which would only allow literate women to vote and which would reduce the number of Black voters.

When the NAWSA annual convention was held in Louisville, no Black speakers were invited. NAWSA organizer, Martha Gruening, petitioned the program committee for the convention to resolve solidarity with all people who could not vote, including Black men. This was denied, as well as her request to invite Mary Church Terrell as the keynote speaker. Later, W. E. B. Du Bois would write a critical editorial on white suffragists in Kentucky called "Suffering Suffragettes," because Gruening reported her own experiences with the convention.

== Anti-suffragism in Kentucky ==
Arguments against women's suffrage in Kentucky often revolved around questions of gender roles and the fears that suffrage would lead to radicalism. People were worried about women getting involved in "public life." The editor of the Courier-Journal, Henry Watterson, wrote that women who voted would become "he-women." Watterson also wrote that when African American men who voted caused "harm" to the public sphere and allowing women to vote would only make things worse. Like him, many white supremacists believed that after African American men had become enfranchised that the electorate was "compromised" and allowing women to vote would only make things worse in their opinion.

== See also ==
- Elections in Kentucky
- List of Kentucky suffragists
- Timeline of women's suffrage in Kentucky
- Women's suffrage in the United States
- Women's suffrage in states of the United States
