= Timeline of women's suffrage in Kentucky =

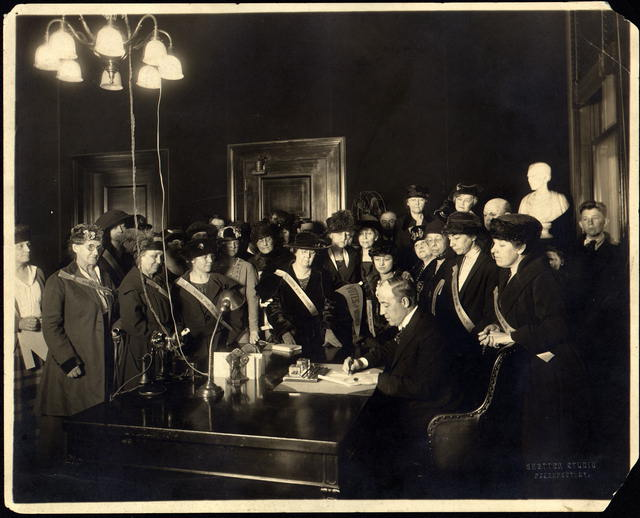
Governor Morrow signs the Nineteenth Amendment.

This is a timeline of women's suffrage in Kentucky. Kentucky was one of the first states to allow women to vote in a limited fashion on tax and school issues as early as 1838. Efforts to curb African American women from voting led to the repeal of school suffrage in the state. Laura Clay and other suffragists continued to lobby and work towards a state suffrage amendment. Later, most Kentucky suffragists would support the Nineteenth Amendment which was ratified by Kentucky on January 6, 1920.

== 19th century ==
=== 1830s ===
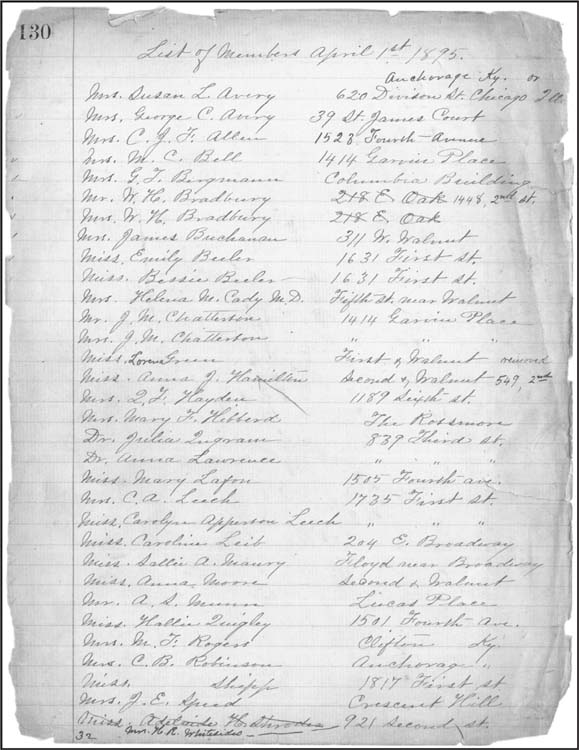
Membership list of the Louisville Equal Rights Association, 1895

1838

- Kentucky passes a state law allowing women who were head of household taxpayers in rural areas the ability to vote in elections for common schools.

=== 1850s ===
1853

- October: Lucretia Mott speaks about women's rights in Maysville.
- November: Lucy Stone speaks about women's rights issues to full houses in Louisville.

=== 1860s ===
1863

- The first book by Virginia Penny, The Employments of Women: A Cyclopaedia of Woman's Work is published.

1866

- March: The Black Convention is formed to discuss equal rights for African Americans in Kentucky.

1867

- July 4: In Lexington, Black women organize a barbecue where speeches in favor of Black suffrage are featured.
- October: Susan B. Anthony and Elizabeth Cady Stanton campaign in Louisville.

=== 1870s ===
1871

- "Qualified women" are allowed to vote in Dayton on a municipal bond of indebtedness.

1879

- October: Susan B. Anthony speaks in Richmond and makes connections with the family of Laura Clay.

=== 1880s ===
1881

- The American Woman Suffrage Association (AWSA) national convention is held in Louisville.

1886

- October: The Association for the Advancement of Women (A.A.W.) meets in Louisville where women's suffrage is publicly discussed.

1887

- July: Mary E. Britton speaks on suffrage issues in Danville at a meeting of the Kentucky Colored Teachers' State Association.

1888

- January: The Fayette County Equal Rights Association is formed.
- November 22: The Kentucky Equal Rights Association (KERA) is formed.
- Women who are widows or "spinsters" are now allowed to vote on school taxes in non-chartered cities.

1889

- November 19–21: Second annual convention of KERA is held in Lexington.
- The Louisville Equal Rights Association (LERA) is formed.

=== 1890s ===
1890

- October: Suffragists lobby politicians in Frankfort during the state constitutional convention.
- December 3–4: Annual meeting of KERA is held in Richmond, John G. Fee is a speaker.

1891

- December 8–10: Anna Howard Shaw spoke at the KERA annual convention held this time in Louisville.

1892

- November 9–10: KERA holds their annual state suffrage meeting in Richmond.
- The Woman's Christian Temperance Union of Kentucky votes to support women's suffrage in the state.

1893

- October 17–19: State suffrage convention is held in Newport.

1894

- Covington, Lexington, and Newport pass school suffrage measures for women.
- Women and members of KERA successfully oppose the reelection of William Campbell Preston Breckinridge.
- October 24–26: State suffrage convention was held in Lexington.

1895

- First and only African American suffrage group in Kentucky is formed, the Covington Colored Organization.
- January 12: Susan B. Anthony gives her "Suffrage for Women" lecture in Louisville.
- December 10–12: The state suffrage convention is held in Richmond.

1896

- December 18: During the state suffrage convention held in Lexington, a committee to work towards full school suffrage in the state is formed.

1897

- Columbus Equal Rights Association is created with 10 members.
- October 14–15: State suffrage convention is held in Covington with Emma Smith DeVoe present.

1898

- December 1: State suffrage convention takes place in Richmond.

1899

- December 11–12: The state suffrage convention takes place in Lexington with Carrie Chapman Catt and Mary Garrett Hay present as speakers.

== 20th century ==
=== 1900s ===
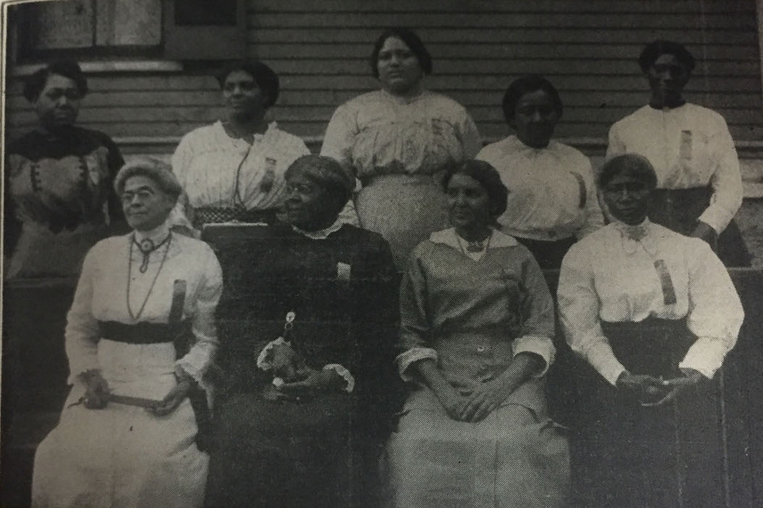
Officers of the Baptist Women's Educational Convention, 1883.

1901

- African American women in Lexington used their right to vote to challenge segregation by opposing the Democratic Party.

1902

- Limited suffrage won by women is repealed by the state legislature.

1903

- KERA starts publishing the Kentucky E.R.A. Newsletter.

1904

- The KERA hires veteran suffrage activist, Frances Woods, to organize in western Kentucky.

1906

- November: Anna Howard Shaw speaks at the state suffrage convention held in Ashland.

1907

- The state suffrage convention is held in Richmond.

1908

- The Louisville Equal Rights Association changes their name to the Woman Suffrage Association of Louisville.
- The Kentucky Federation of Women's Clubs (KFWC) pursues a school suffrage bill in the state legislature.

1909

- November 11–12: The state suffrage convention is held in Louisville and Shaw attends.

=== 1910s ===
1910

- November: Shaw speaks in Covington.

1911

- October 19–25: NAWSA holds their annual convention in Louisville.

1912

- The right to vote in school elections for literate women is secured statewide.
- The Louisville Woman Suffrage Association (LWSA) has a get out the vote telephone campaign to reach new voters.
- The state Democratic Party includes a school suffrage plank in their party platform.

1913

- July: The Anderson County Woman's Suffrage League is formed.

1914

- The KFWC officially endorses women's suffrage.

1915

- The state Republican Party endorses women's suffrage in their party platform.

1916

- Both the Democratic and Republican Parties endorsed women's suffrage in the state.
- May: A parade of over 1,000 suffragists march in Lexington.

1917

- Suffragists in the state are involved in war work to support World War I.
- August: Cornelia Beach of Kentucky is arrested at a National Woman's Party (NWP) protest.

1918

- The annual state suffrage convention was cancelled due to the flu epidemic.

1919

- Laura Clay starts the Citizens' Committee for a State Suffrage Amendment.
- March 11–12: state suffrage convention is held in Louisville.

=== 1920s ===
1920

- January 6: Kentucky ratifies the 19th Amendment.

== See also ==
- Elections in Kentucky
- List of Kentucky suffragists
- Timeline of women's suffrage in the United States
- Women's suffrage in Kentucky
- Women's suffrage in the United States
- Women's suffrage in states of the United States
