= Marian Hord Hubbard =

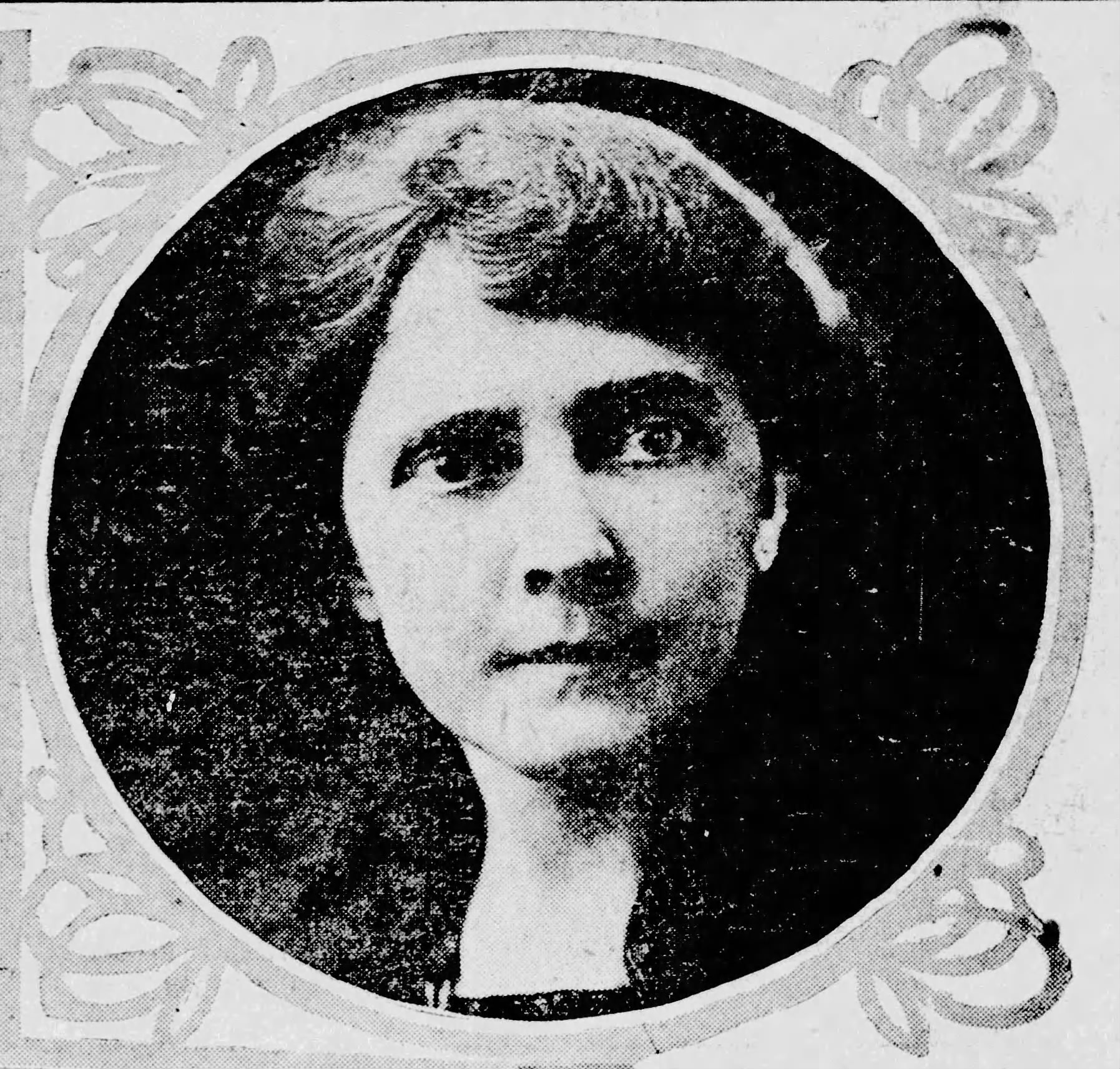
Marian Hubbard in The Atlanta Journal February 9, 1921

Marian "May" Hord Hubbard (1874 – November 22 1959) was an American suffragist and social reformer mainly active in Kentucky and Atlanta.

Hubbard was born in Maysville, Kentucky in 1874. She married Murray Rodman Hubbard in January, 1903.

When women earned the right to vote for school officials in Kentucky in 1912, Hubbard organized women to turn out and vote in Covington. Hubbard worked with the Kentucky Equal Rights Association (KERA) and the Kentucky Federation of Women's Clubs (KFWC) in 1914 and 1915 as a lobbyist to Kentucky politicians. She also kept state suffragists informed about voting news in Congress. In these capacities, she urged all state political parties in Kentucky to support women's suffrage. Hubbard was involved in other civic projects in Kentucky, including asking for women to serve on the police force.

In the early 1920s, she moved to Atlanta where she was involved with the local League of Women Voters. In the 1930s, she was involved in raising money for the Rabun Gap-Nacoochee School.

Her husband died in 1922. Marian Hubbard died in a hospital in Atlanta on November 22, 1959.
