= Jessie Taft =

American philosopher

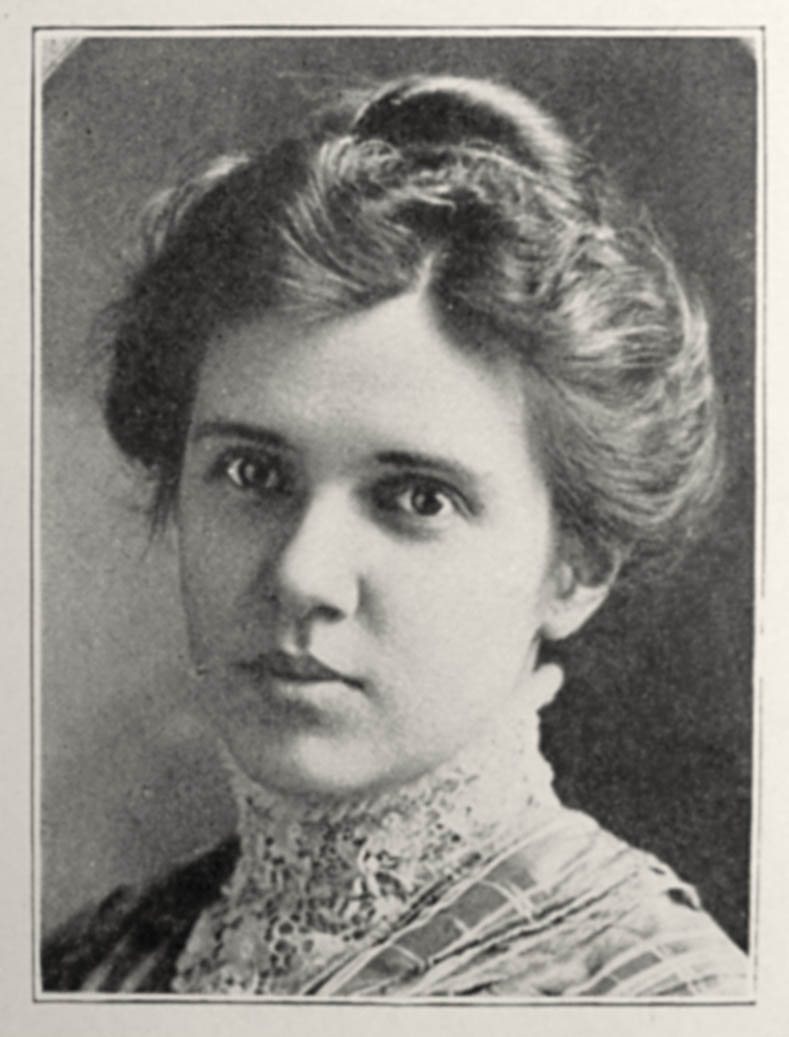
- Jessie Taft at age 26 in 1908
- Born: Julia Jessie Taft; June 24, 1882; Dubuque, Iowa, United States
- Died: June 7, 1960 (aged 77); Flourtown, Pennsylvania, United States
- Education: Drake University (B.A.), University of Chicago (Ph.B.)
- Occupation: philosopher
- Known for: early authority on child placement and therapeutic adoption
- Partner: Virginia Pollard Robinson
- Children: Everett, Martha (both adopted)
- Parents: Charles Chester Taft (father); Amanda May Farwell (mother)

Julia Jessie Taft (June 24, 1882 – June 7, 1960) was an American philosopher and an early authority on child placement and therapeutic adoption. Educated at the University of Chicago, she spent the bulk of her professional life at the University of Pennsylvania, where she and Virginia Robinson were the co-founders and innovators of the functional approach to social work. Taft is the author of The Dynamics of Therapy in a Controlled Relationship (1933). She is also remembered for her work as the translator and biographer of Otto Rank, an outcast disciple of Sigmund Freud; in addition, development of the functional approach to social work was greatly inspired by her work with Rank. She and her lifelong companion, Virginia Robinson, adopted and raised two children.

== Personal life ==
Jessie Taft was born Julia Jessie Taft on June 24, 1882, in Dubuque, Iowa, the oldest of three sisters. Her parents were Charles Chester Taft and Amanda May Farwell, who moved from Vermont to Iowa. There is no known connection to the famous offspring of the Vermont Tafts. Her father established a prosperous wholesale fruit business in Des Moines. Her mother was a homemaker who gradually became deaf and distant from her daughters.

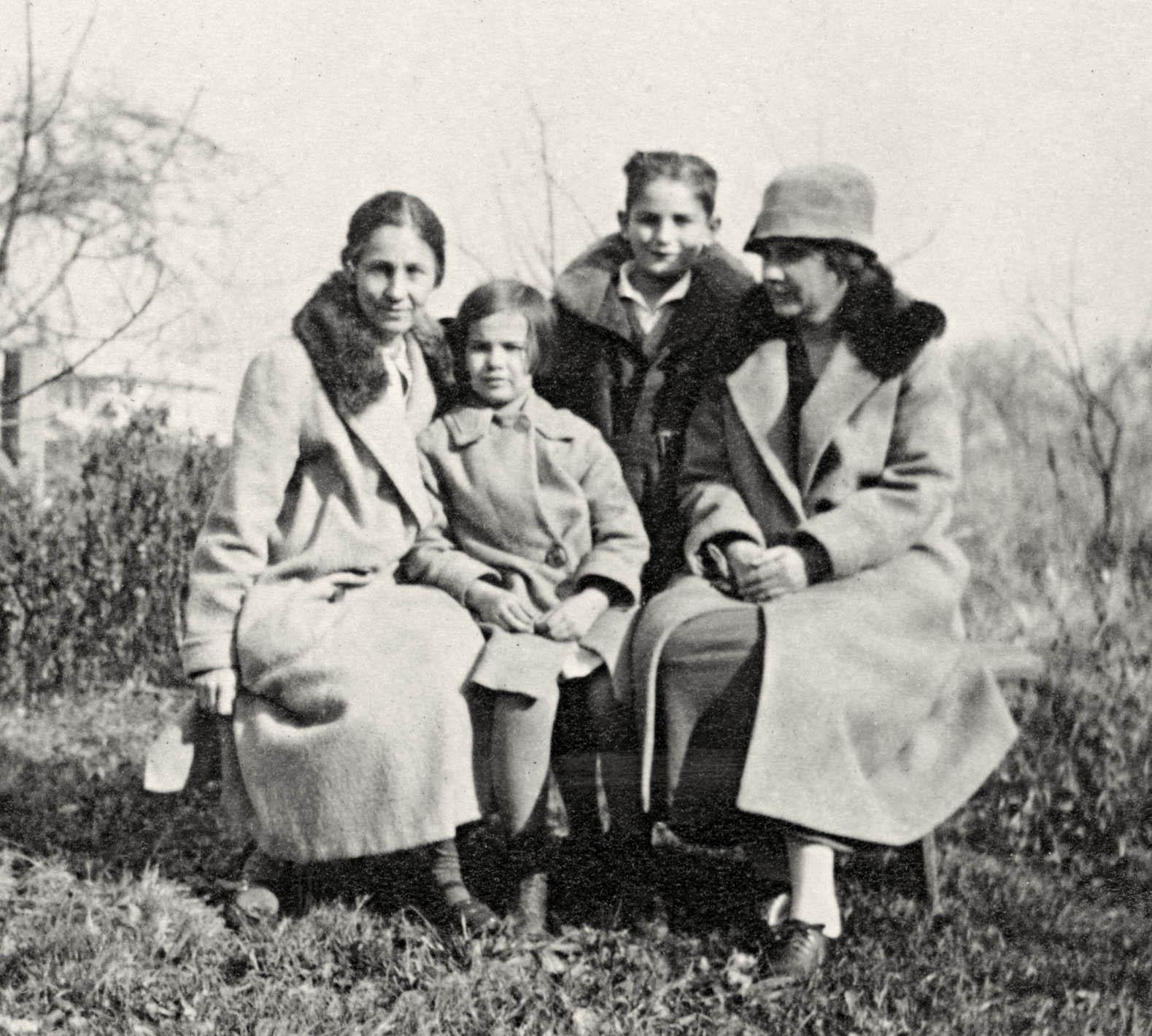
Jessie Taft with family in 1923. (L-R) Jessie, Martha, and Everett Taft, Virginia Robinson. Everett was adopted in 1921, Martha in 1923.

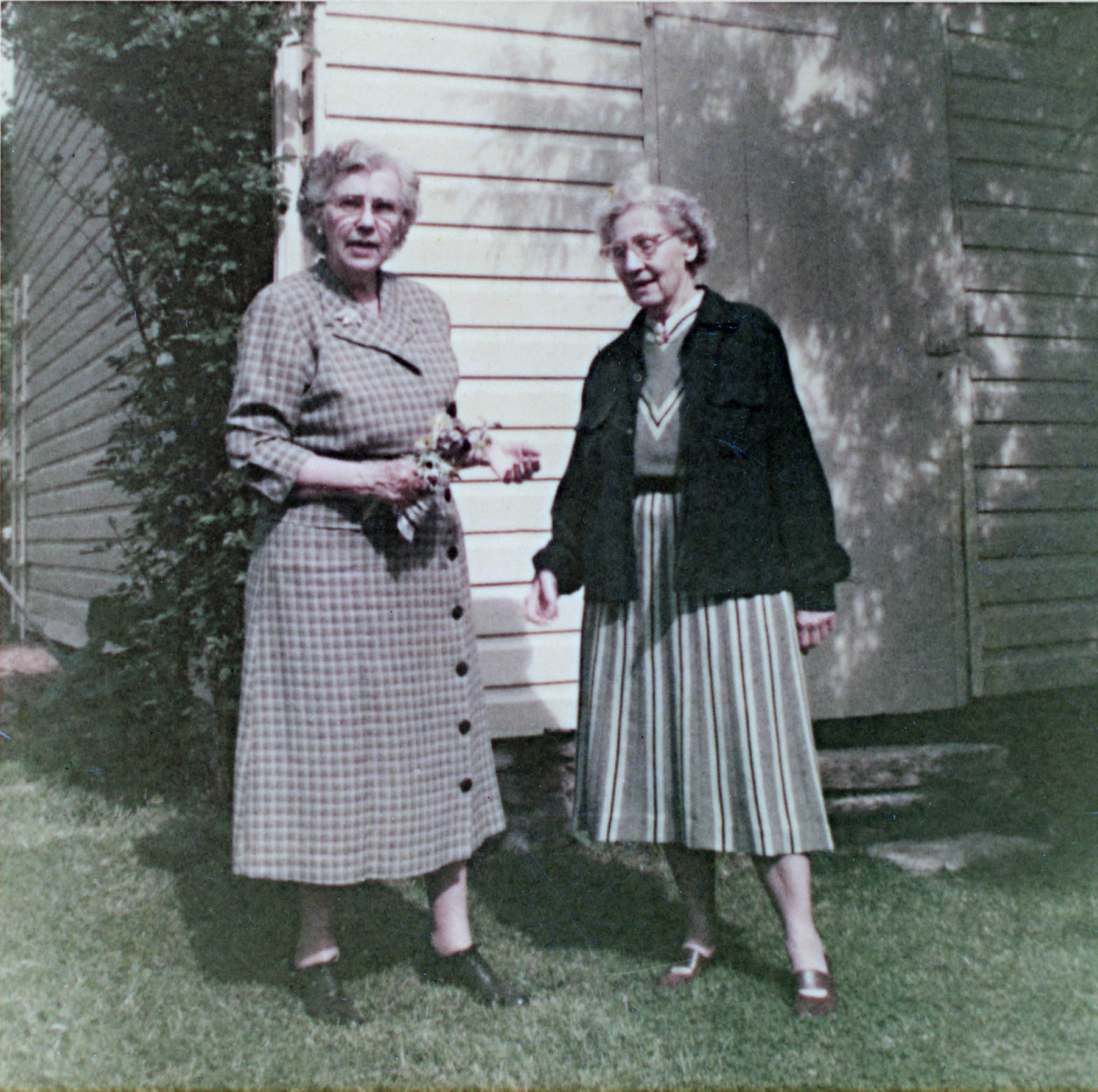
Jessie Taft with lifelong companion Virginia Robinson in May 1954 by their home, "The Pocket", in Flourtown, Pennsylvania

Taft attended and graduated from West Des Moines High School. She then went to Drake University in Des Moines, Iowa, and received a B.A. degree in 1904. Also in her class of 1904 at Drake was Clara Charlotte Hastings, granddaughter of Pardee Butler and older sister of Milo Hastings. Two decades later Taft was to adopt a boy, Everett, the first-born son of Milo Hastings and Frances Horowitz. There is no evidence that Taft realized she was adopting the nephew of a former college classmate.

After college at Drake, Taft went to the University of Chicago and earned a Ph.B. in 1905. She then went back to Des Moines to her former high school and taught there for four years. In 1908 she returned to the University of Chicago for graduate work. At that time she met Virginia P. Robinson. The two women became lifelong companions and colleagues. In 1909 she got a fellowship and began working with George H. Mead (who became her thesis adviser), James Hayden Tufts, and William I. Thomas. She also worked at Hull House, the social settlement of Jane Addams. Taft completed her doctoral thesis "The Woman Movement from the Point of View of Social Consciousness" in 1913. It was published in book form in 1916.

In 1912, Taft found work at The Bedford Hills Reformatory for Women in New York City and stayed there until 1915. She then practiced psychology for four years before becoming director of the Child Study Department of the Children's Aid Society in Pennsylvania. Taft and Robinson moved to Flourtown, Pennsylvania, close by Carson Valley School, where they were close friends with the staff. Taft, the school and its staff appear in the novel Double Stitch by John Rolfe Gardiner. In about 1920 Taft and Robinson bought a house on East Mill Road in Flourtown that became known as "The Pocket", so called because the women had to dig deeply into their pockets to purchase the property.

Taft was finally able to begin an academic career in 1919 at the University of Pennsylvania School of Social Policy and Practice. In 1934 she became the director of the School.

In 1921, Taft and Robinson made the decision to adopt two children. Everett was adopted on his birthday July 9, 1921, at age nine. Martha Scott was adopted in 1923 at age 6. Everett went on to marry and raise a family. Martha, who never married, became Chief Dietitian for the Veterans Administration Hospital in Philadelphia.

In 1924, Taft met Otto Rank, an outcast disciple of Sigmund Freud, and became his American champion and translator. She retired in 1950 to organize Rank's papers (he died in 1939) which were donated to Columbia University, and to write his biography which was published in 1958. E. James Lieberman wrote another biography of Rank in 1985 with many references to Taft.

Taft died on June 7, 1960, in Flourtown, Pennsylvania, after suffering a stroke. Virginia Robinson lived on until 1977, writing a biography of Taft that came out in 1962.

== Professional life ==
=== Thesis ===
Taft's thesis topic was "The Woman Movement from the Point of View of Social Consciousness" accepted in 1913 by the Philosophy department at the University of Chicago. It was published by the University of Chicago Press in 1916 with a note acknowledging her "indebtedness to Professor James H. Tufts and Professor George H. Mead for their advice and counsel".

The thesis is 25,000 words long probing the moving boundaries of private and public, subjects that galvanized new thinking about governing modern social problems therapeutically. She invoked philosophers from Plato to Kant, surveying how religious, political and economic revolutions shaped consciousness of self and detailed the conflicts women face at home and at work. The Introduction sets out the problem:

Every nook and corner of feminine nature has been brought to light and examined as if woman were a newly discovered species. Yet out of this endless controversy only a very general agreement has been reached. It is fair to say that the majority of intelligent people today are agreed on at least two points: the necessity of improving motherhood and the need of some form of useful work for every woman. But here the agreement ends. It is the purpose of this thesis to determine just what are the problems represented by the woman movement, to trace their connection with the larger, more inclusive social problems, and to indicate in a general way the direction from which a solution may be expected.

The Conclusion is a summary and prophecy:

The course of the preceding argument has been very briefly as follows: first, the woman movement is the expression of very genuine problems both for the individual woman and for society as a whole; second, those problems are the result of an unavoidable conflict of impulses and habits, values and standards...; third, such conflicts are, as a matter of fact, equally real for men and for women as the labor movement testifies, and give evidence of a real dualism of self and social environment...; and finally, the restoration of equality between self and environment depends on the possibility of developing a higher type of self-consciousness whose perfect comprehension of its relations to other selves would make possible a controlled adjustment of those relations from the point of view of all concerned.
-----
With women...social impulses are the only ones which are overtly recognized. Women are constantly forced into the economic world, but the system ignores that fact and provides in no way for combining the peculiar social function of women with any economic function which they may find desirable or necessary. Such economic expression as has been conceded to them is confined to the home. Likewise, the other impulses, even the maternal, have no recognized place outside the limits of the individual home. For the woman, the system has no avenues of fulfilment foreseen and provided beforehand for any impulse whatsoever outside the home itself.
-----
All of this hopeless conflict among impulses which the woman feels she has legitimate right, even a moral obligation, to express, all of the rebellion against stupid, meaningless sacrifice of powers that ought to be used by society, constitutes the force, conscious or unconscious, which motivates the woman movement and will continue to vitalize it until some adjustment is made.

Taft's thesis became one of the philosophical foundations of the feminist movement.

=== Professional career ===
After completing her thesis in 1913 Taft desired an academic position but women of this era were mostly excluded from that life. So for over two decades she worked in the world of child and family services. Her first job was with Katherine Bement Davis as the assistant superintendent at the New York State Reformatory for Women. When Davis left the Reformatory so did Taft moving from the field of delinquency to the new field of mental hygiene as the Director of the Mental Hygiene Committee of the State Charities Aid Association of New York. In 1918 she left the Committee because of World War I and left New York for Philadelphia (where Robinson was on staff at the Pennsylvania School of Social Work) to join the Seybert Institution as director of a new Department or Child Study, organizing a school for problem children and doing much case work. She wrote many papers and spoke often about what she had learned and the diagnostic techniques she pioneered for dealing with institutionalized children.

Finally in 1919 Taft was able to enter the academic world as a full-time faculty member of the School of Social Policy and Practice. The School was the first in the country to have an advanced curriculum focused on social work. Taft's thinking and teaching simulated and guided this program from its inception in 1934 until her retirement in 1950. Robinson in her professional biography of Taft writes that "The discovery of the use of function in helping processes, the most significant and influential concept in the development of theory and practice in the Pennsylvania School of Social Work, remains Dr. Taft's most significant and enduring contribution to theory and practice in social casework." She was an articulate and well-known founder and proponent of the Rankian "functional" approach to both social work and to social work education. This approach was distinct from the widespread Freudian "diagnostic" approach to social work, and there was a marked contrast between the two. While the functional school was a minority, it had a strong influence on the larger social work field; it was also at times the subject of debate and controversy.

Taft retired from the University of Pennsylvania after commencement in June 1950. For the first few years she still taught a few courses and was a consultant on the doctoral council. She then turned her full attention to translating and organizing the papers of Otto Rank which were given to her at the time of Rank's death in 1939. Rank's papers were given to Columbia University. Later the papers of Taft and Robinson were also given to Columbia.

=== Otto Rank ===
Otto Rank (1884–1939) was an outcast disciple of Sigmund Freud. Rank met Freud in 1905 when Rank was just 21. Rank became Freud's protégé and closest associate. During the formative years of the psychoanalytic movement Rank was the recording secretary of the Vienna Psychoanalytic Society. In 1924 Rank published The Trauma of Birth which emphasized the mother-child relationship and was viewed askance by the conservatives in the Committee, Freud's inner circle. In 1926 Rank split publicly with Freud and was slowly ostracized from the psychoanalytic establishment.

Taft was first Otto Rank's patient, then his student and friend, and, finally, biographer and American exponent. After George H. Mead, Rank was the most influential person in Taft's professional life. Taft's first contact with Rank came in June 1924 at a meeting of the American Psychoanalytic Association in Atlantic City where he gave a paper on The Trauma of Birth. Taft "... was interested in psychoanalysis as a further training measure for myself in the future and I wanted to see who these analysts were and what they were like."

Taft was impressed by Rank and arranged for analysis by him which took place in New York in the fall of 1926. Her motivation "... was not due to any conscious personal need nor the lack of professional success, but to the deep awareness of being stopped in professional development.... Psychological testing of children was useful but, as I knew only too well, it was not therapeutic." To further her therapeutic skills she joined the Rankian group in New York in 1927.

In 1930 Rank introduced the idea of "will" therapy, a radical idea in academic circles. Will for Rank, as defined by Taft, "... is the integrated personality as original creative force, that which acts, not merely reacts, upon the environment." Rank emphasized conscious will to explain human behavior. By contrast, Freud emphasized the subconscious. Unlike most of her medical colleagues Taft took this novel new idea in stride. "I had been brought up on pragmatism and the thinking of George Herbert Mead and John Dewey. For me there was nothing to lose." Taft stood by Rank and his ideas but many others did not, and Rank was marginalized.

In 1936 Taft translated Rank's Will Therapy: An Analysis of the Therapeutic Process in Terms of Relationship and Truth and Reality: A Life History of the Human Will from German into English. When Rank died in 1939 Taft was given all his papers and became his chief American exponent.

Taft incorporated Rank's ideas on "will" into her therapeutic social work, and even more significantly, into the training of social workers at the Pennsylvania School of Social Work. The strong foundation laid by Jessie Taft and Virginia Robinson, meant that from about 1930 up until about 1985, the school continued to train social workers in a Rankian-inspired approach to working with clients.

=== Carl Rogers ===
Carl Rogers (1902 – 1987) was an American psychologist and among the founders of the humanistic approach (or client-centered approach) to psychology. Taft played a significant role in Rogers' development of his non-directive approach by presenting her work to the staff of the Society for Prevention of Cruelty to Children in Rochester, while Rogers worked as the director there. Taft introduced Rogers to Rank's relational approach to therapy, which inspired Rogers to later meet Rank. Rogers was also inspired by Taft's book where she describes the step-by-step journey of working with two specific child clients; this was an early precedent for Rogers' subsequent research where he continued to "pull back the curtain" to explore what happens within a therapeutic relationship.

== Bibliography ==
- Seigfried, Charlene Haddock (Spring 1993). "Introduction to Jessie Taft, "The Woman Movement from the Point of View of Social Consciousness"". Hypatia. 8 (2): 215–218. doi:10.1111/j.1527-2001.1993.tb00100.x. S2CID 144797345.
- Axinn, June (1980). Notable American Women: The Modern Period. Belknap Press, Cambridge MA. pp. 683–685.
- Contosta, David R. (1997). Philadelphia's Progressive Orphanage, The Carson Valley School. Pennsylvania State University Press, University Park PA.
- Deegan, Mary Jo (1991). Women in Sociology. Greenwood Press, New York. pp. 383–390.
- Gardiner, John Rolfe (2003). Double Stitch. Counterpoint, A Member of the Perseus Books Group, New York.
- Herman, Ellen (2008). Kinship by Design: A History of Adoption in the Modern United States. The University of Chicago Press, Chicago and London.
- Lieberman, E. James, M.D. (1985). Acts of Will, The Life and Work of Otto Rank. The Free Press, A division of Macmillan, Inc., New York.
- Robinson, Virginia P. (1978). The Development of a Professional Self: Teaching and Learning in Professional Helping Processes, Selected Writings, 1930-1968. AMS Press, New York.
- Robinson, Virginia P. (1962). Jessie Taft, Therapist and Social Work Educator, A Professional Biography. University of Pennsylvania Press, Philadelphia.
- Taft, Jessie (1933). The Dynamics of Therapy in a Controlled Relationship. Macmillan Company.
- Taft, Jessie (1958). Otto Rank, A Biographical Study Based on Notebooks, Letters, Collected Writings, Therapeutic Achievements and Personal Associations. The Julian Press, Inc., New York.
- Taft, Jessie (1916). The Woman Movement from the Point of View of Social Consciousness. University of Chicago Press.
- Columbia University Library. Has professional papers of Jessie Taft and Virginia Robinson. The collection consists of 300 items in 3 boxes.
- Radcliffe University. The Ethel S. Dummer Papers at the Schlesinger Library contains a correspondence between Taft and Drummer.
- University of Pennsylvania. Have a vertical file on Taft and pictures.

== External references ==
- The Adoption History Project. Jessie Taft is one of the featured persons.
- Jessie Taft Thesis: The Woman Movement from the Point of View of Social Consciousness
