= Christine Bradley South =

American suffragist (1878–1957)

- South in 1915
- Born: December 20, 1878; Lancaster, Kentucky, US
- Died: February 20, 1957 (aged 78); Frankfort, Kentucky, US
- Occupations: Suffragist, politician
- Spouse: Dr. John Glover South
- Parent(s): Margaret Duncan and William O'Connell Bradley

Christine Bradley South (December 20, 1878 – February 20, 1957) was president of the Kentucky Equal Rights Association for three years (1916–1919). She was a Vice-President of KERA when her cousin (on her mother's side), Governor Edwin P. Morrow, signed into law Kentucky's ratification of the Nineteenth Amendment on January 6, 1920. She served as a delegate from Kentucky to the Republican National Convention in 1920, 1928 and 1932; and in 1937 she served on the Republican National Committee.

== Background and early life ==
The second of two children of Margaret Duncan and Kentucky Governor William O'Connell Bradley, Christine Duncan Bradley was born on December 20, 1878, and grew up in Lancaster, Kentucky. Her brother, George Robertson Bradley, died when she was thirteen. She read law in her father's office and traveled with him on his campaigns, riding a mule to get through the mountains of eastern Kentucky Appalachia.

She married Dr. John Glover South (January 23, 1873 - May 13, 1940) of Frankfort, Kentucky, on November 2, 1904, and her father bought them a house in Frankfort.

== Leadership in woman suffrage movement ==
After Elise Bennett Smith resigned as president of the Kentucky Equal Rights Association (KERA), South was elected in November 1916. She made sure in 1917 that the KERA leadership followed the request from National American Woman Suffrage Association president Carrie Chapman Catt to denounce the more radical activities of the National Woman's Party.

In 1919 she was elected First Vice President of KERA when Madeline McDowell Breckinridge returned to the presidency.

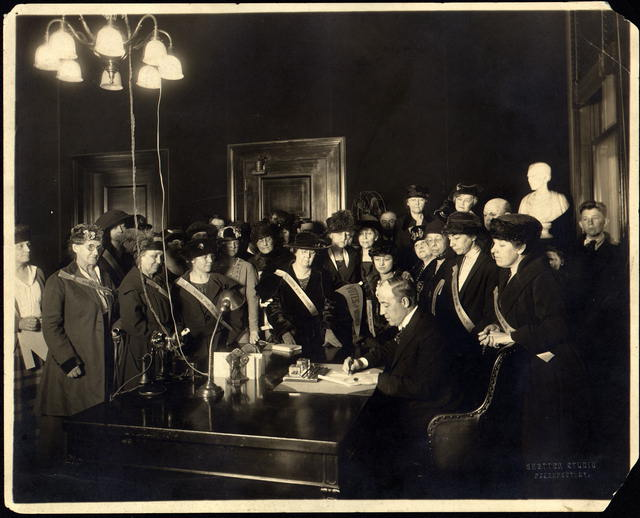
South can be seen in this photo in front of Governor Morrow's desk, 4th from the left, as he signs Kentucky's ratification of the Nineteenth Amendment.

She was the First Vice President when her cousin, Kentucky Governor Edwin P. Morrow signed into law the ratification by Kentucky of the Nineteenth Amendment.

In keeping with the NAWSA's ideals of non-partisanship, she publicly commended the Democratic President Woodrow Wilson for his role in advocating for the federal amendment: "... He goes now to perfect that which has been baptized with the fire of the battle and sealed with a covenant of blood – a world-wide democracy, a democracy in truth of all the people."

== Political roles in Republican Party ==
After women were granted the right to stand for any electoral office, South ran in the summer of 1921 on the Republican ticket for a seat on the Frankfort City Council. She did not win, but her husband was appointed that year as the American Minister to Panama and they left the country. She traveled back to the U.S. often to take care of her widowed mother and to serve as an official delegate from Kentucky to the Republican National Convention. She attended the conventions in 1920, 1928 (that year she was given the honor of seconding the Hoover nomination) and 1932. In 1924 that she was “being seriously discussed” as a nominee for U.S. Senator from Kentucky.

She stumped for President Herbert Hoover in 1932, and in 1937 she served as a member of the Republican National Committee.

== Later life and death ==
By 1940, when her husband died, South was working in public relations with the State Department of Health. She retired in 1951 and died at home in Frankfort, Kentucky on February 20, 1957.
