= John Glover South =

American physician and diplomat (1873–1940)

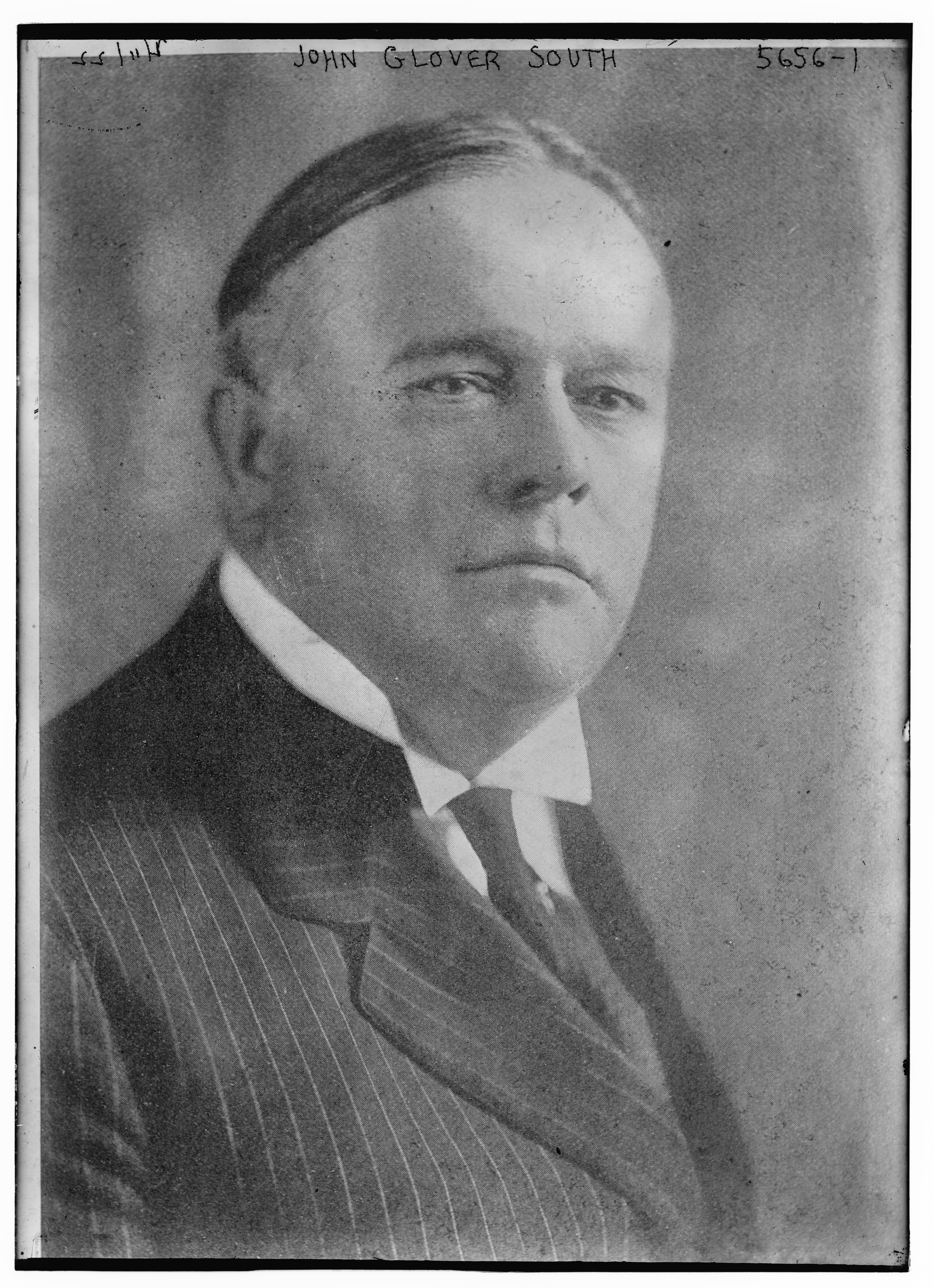

United States Ambassador to Portugal
- In office March 26, 1930 – July 28, 1933
- President: Herbert Hoover
- Preceded by: Fred Morris Dearing
- Succeeded by: Robert Granville Caldwell

United States Ambassador to Panama
- In office December 28, 1921 – January 5, 1929
- President: Warren G. Harding; Calvin Coolidge
- Preceded by: William Jennings Price
- Succeeded by: Roy T. Davis

Personal details
- Born: January 23, 1873 Frankfort, Kentucky, U.S.
- Died: May 13, 1940 (aged 67)
- Resting place: Frankfort Cemetery; Frankfort, Kentucky, U.S.
- Party: Republican
- Spouse: Christine Bradley (m. 1904)
- Relations: South-Cockrell-Hargis family

John Glover South (January 23, 1873 – May 13, 1940) was an American physician and diplomat who served as the United States Ambassador to Panama from 1921 to 1929, and the United States Ambassador to Portugal from 1930 to 1933. He was a member of the Republican Party.

Born in Frankfort, Kentucky, South was a member of the prominent South–Cockrell–Hargis political family. On November 2, 1904, he married Christine Bradley, daughter of William O. Bradley, who served as governor of Kentucky from 1895 to 1899.

In 1921, South was appointed United States Ambassador to Panama by president Warren G. Harding. He served in the role until 1929. In 1930, he was appointed ambassador to Portugal by president Herbert Hoover, and served until 1933, when he retired from diplomatic life.

South was the president of the Kentucky Medical Society and the Kentucky Board of Health.

At the age of 67, South died on May 13, 1940, after a long illness. He was interred at Frankfort Cemetery in Frankfort, Kentucky.
