= Aunt Jane of Kentucky =

Short story collection by Eliza Calvert Hall

Aunt Jane of Kentucky is a collection of nine short stories written by American author Eliza "Lida" Calvert Obenchain. Obenchain wrote the book under the pen name Eliza Calvert Hall, a pseudonym that she frequently used when writing her fictional works. Set in rural western Kentucky in the late nineteenth century, the book recounts an elderly quilt-maker Aunt Jane's memories of life in the rural south as told to an unnamed younger woman visitor.

The collection under the title Aunt Jane of Kentucky was first published together in 1907. The book appeared in at least thirty-three editions and reached approximately one million readers.

The most famous reader was perhaps United States President Theodore Roosevelt who suggested reading the book to listeners during a 1908 speech: "I cordially recommend the first chapter of Aunt Jane of Kentucky as a tract in all families where the menfolk tend to selfish or thoughtless or overbearing disregard to the rights of their womenfolk."

Beulah Strong, an artist trained in Paris and teaching at Potter College in Bowling Green, Kentucky, used the description of Aunt Jane at the beginning of the story, "Sally Ann's Experience," as her model for the book's frontispiece. Strong created fourteen more pen and ink illustrations to open nine of the stories and to serve as tail-pieces at the end of five stories.

== Stories ==
- I. Sally Ann's Experience
- II. The New Organ
- III. Aunt Jane's Album
- IV. "Sweet Day of Rest"
- V. Milly Baker's Boy
- VI. The Baptizing at Kittle Creek
- VII. How Sam Amos Rode in the Tournament
- VIII. Mary Andrews' Dinner Party
- IX. The Gardens of Memory

== Publication history and reception ==
The first story in the book Sally Ann's Experience was originally published in Cosmopolitan magazine in 1898. The popularity of the story resulted in it being reprinted in Cosmopolitan multiple times, and printed in various other popular newspapers and magazines around the world. After its inclusion in Aunt Jane of Kentucky (Boston: Little, Brown, and Company, 1907) the demand for the story remained high, so Little, Brown, and Company republished it in 1910. In an Introduction to the 1910 republication of the story, Obenchain describes it as "a plain tale of plain people told in the plain dialect of a plain old woman.".

In 1995 Aunt Jane of Kentucky was reprinted by the University Press of Kentucky as a paperback with a new foreword by Bonnie Jean Cox, University of Kentucky Libraries.

Another collection of Aunt Jane stories was published in 1909 as The Land of Long Ago.
