= Sally Ann's Experience =

Sally Ann's Experience is an 1898 short story written by American author Eliza "Lida" Calvert Obenchain under the pen name Eliza Calvert Hall.

== Aunt Jane ==
"Aunt Jane", an elderly spinster, was a recurring character in Lida Obenchain's short stories. She told the experiences of the people in a rural southern town named Goshen to a younger woman visitor who relayed them to the reader. This type of rhetorical device, called a "double narrative", was a common form of storytelling in this era. Aunt Jane spoke with a heavy regional dialect and a folksy style. She tells of the problems facing women of her time with imagery and symbolism taken from the domestic arts of sewing, cooking, and gardening.

== Publication history ==
Cosmopolitan published "Sally Ann's Experience" in 1898. The story was reprinted in the Woman's Journal, the Ladies' Home Journal, and in international magazines and newspapers such as the series beginning December 1898 in The White Ribbon, official journal for the Women's Christian Temperance Union of New Zealand. When Obenchain published her first book, a collection of short stories featuring Aunt Jane, in 1907 under the title Aunt Jane of Kentucky, Sally Ann's Experience' was the first story in the book. The demand for the story remained high, so Little, Brown, and Company republished it in 1910. Obenchain added an introduction to the 1910 republication of the story. In it, she describes the story as "a plain tale of plain people told in the plain dialect of a plain old woman".
