= Trinity Episcopal Church (Covington, Kentucky) =

Historic church in Kentucky, United States

- U.S. National Register of Historic Places
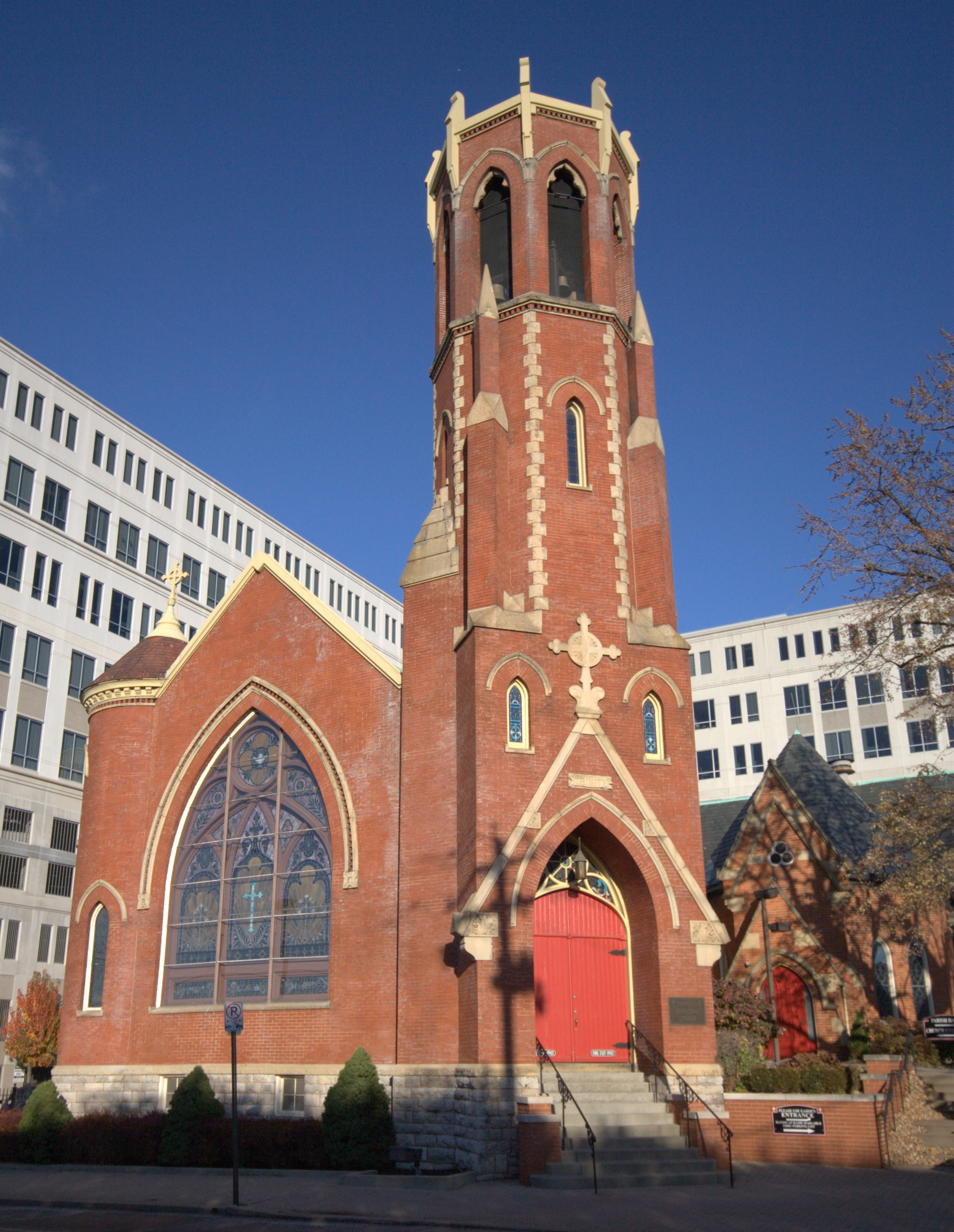

- Location within Kentucky Location within the United States
- Location: 16 East Fourth Street, Covington, Kentucky
- Coordinates: 39°5′15″N 84°30′39″W
- Built: 1857
- Architectural style: Gothic
- NRHP reference No.: 82002730
- Added to NRHP: March 1, 1982

Trinity Episcopal Church is located in Covington, Kentucky, Madison Avenue. This historic church was founded November 24, 1842, in a third floor of a brick building near the Covington market. The cornerstone of the first church was June 24, 1843 and the first service was on June 30, 1844. The church has served the people of Covington and Cincinnati, Ohio through wars and floods. The church is active today, with a large congregation at its Fourth and Madison Avenue location. The Rev. Peter D'Angio is the rector. It is the second-largest parish in the Episcopal Diocese of Lexington.

Trinity Episcopal Church was placed on the National Register of Historic Places on March 1, 1982. This was because it is an excellent example of how medieval techniques in architectural design affected Episcopal church building in the United States in the 19th century, in a style known as Gothic Revival.

== History ==
Trinity Episcopal Church, a member of the Episcopal Diocese of Lexington, was officially founded in 1829, although the first Episcopal church in Kentucky was built in 1796 in central Kentucky, known as "The Episcopal Society". The first Trinity Episcopal Church in Covington was a wooden structure with external walls of board and batten built in 1843, after $350 was spent to purchase the land.

The current building was constructed between 1857 and 1859. The timber and truss roof lies above a brick and stone masonry structure. An 1871 expansion had to be rebuilt in 1872 due to fire, with the mayor of Covington giving land to Trinity Episcopal Church in 1872 to assist. In 1885 a two-story guild hall was constructed to serve the church. Further additions in 1887 and 1888 included a new western front and a new nave bay, which allowed for a new baptistery and entry bell tower. The last enhancements to the building were in 1961 and 1962, which included an L-shaped annex of brick used for classrooms and offices.

Governor of Kentucky and Senator, John W. Stevenson, belonged to Trinity Episcopal Church. The first public library in Covington was built by Trinity Episcopal.

In October 1897, the Kentucky Equal Rights Association's ninth annual convention at Guild Hall, Trinity Church. The Kenton County Equal Rights Association, led by its president Mrs. Eugenia B. Farmer (and which met biweekly at the home of Mrs. Sallie B. Wolcott) hosted the convention.

The Ohio River flood of 1937 reached Trinity Episcopal, causing extensive water damage on the bottom floor. The Church struggled to pay for repairs.

== Description ==
Brass, decorative windows, and wood carvings enhance the chancel, nave, sacristy, sanctuary, and south transept.
