= Eliza Calvert Hall =

American author and suffragist

Eliza Caroline Obenchain
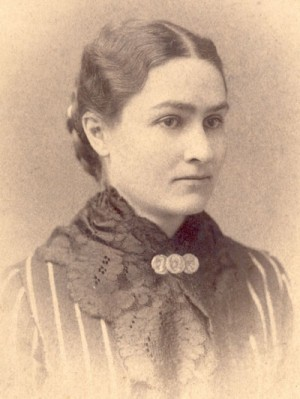
- Born: Eliza Caroline Calvert; February 11, 1856; Bowling Green, Kentucky
- Died: December 20, 1935 (aged 79); Wichita Falls, Texas
- Education: Western Female Seminary
- Spouse: William Alexander Obenchain (m. 1885)
- Writing career
- Pen name: Eliza Calvert Hall
- Genre: Short stories
- Notable work: Aunt Jane of Kentucky

Eliza Caroline "Lida" Obenchain (née Calvert; February 11, 1856 – December 20, 1935), known by her pen name Eliza Calvert Hall, was an American author, women's rights advocate, and suffragist from Bowling Green, Kentucky. She was widely known early in the 20th century for her short stories featuring an elderly widowed woman, "Aunt Jane", who plainly spoke her mind about the people she knew and her experiences in the rural south.

Obenchain's best known work is Aunt Jane of Kentucky which received extra notability when United States President Theodore Roosevelt recommended the book to the American people during a speech, saying, "I cordially recommend the first chapter of Aunt Jane of Kentucky as a tract in all families where the menfolk tend to selfish or thoughtless or overbearing disregard to the rights of their womenfolk."

== Biography ==
Eliza Caroline Calvert, daughter of Thomas Chalmers Calvert and Margaret (Younglove) Calvert, was born in Bowling Green, Kentucky on February 11, 1856. She was known as "Lida" throughout her life. Lida's father Thomas Chalmers Calvert was born in Giles County, Tennessee to Samuel Wilson Calvert, a Presbyterian minister, and his wife Eliza Caroline (Hall) Calvert. Lida's mother, Margaret Younglove, was from Johnstown, New York.

Lida attended a local private school, and then Western Female Seminary in Oxford, Ohio. She pursued two of the careers acceptable for a single woman in her era, teaching school and writing sentimental poetry. She began her professional writing career to help support her mother and siblings. Scribner's Monthly magazine accepted two of her poems for publication in 1879 and paid her the equivalent of US$600. She continued writing and had at least six more poems published before age thirty.

On July 8, 1885, Lida married 44-year-old Major William Alexander Obenchain. Obenchain was a Virginia native and American Civil War veteran who in 1883 became president of Ogden College, a small men's school in Bowling Green. Lida and William had four children: Margery, William Alexander Jr. (Alex), Thomas Hall and Cecilia (Cecil). Her family responsibilities left her with limited time to write. Her frustration as an unpaid housewife motivated her to support the cause of women's suffrage and to work with the Kentucky Equal Rights Association.

== Women's rights and woman suffrage activism ==
Lida was a passionate advocate of suffrage and women's rights. She envisioned a time when "woman's growing self-respect made her rise in revolt, and out of her conflict and her victory came a higher civilization for the whole world." See also her 1892 article, Why Democratic Women Want the Ballot published under the pseudonym, "A Kentucky Woman" for The National Bulletin in 1892.

Lida had been involved in suffrage concerns since 1897 when she wrote papers and other contributions to the KERA conventions each year. She was a frequent contributor to the Woman's Journal in 1899. She also served as corresponding secretary in the Bowling Green association, handing out literature and traveling to Nashville, Tennessee, to present papers.

In 1899, Elnora Babcock, superintendent of press work at the National American Woman Suffrage Association headquarters, urged the Kentucky ERA to fill a vacancy for press superintendent. In 1900, Kentucky Equal Rights Association President Laura Clay recruited Lida, then president of the Bowling Green ERA chapter, to the role of press superintendent for Kentucky. While she advanced ready-to-print material on the women's suffrage movement to newspapers, much of the material she submitted was her own commentary. In her role as press superintendent, Lida published more than 500 articles in Kentucky newspapers in 1901. The one newspaper in which she failed to obtain space for her articles was the Courier-Journal, whose editor, Henry Watterson, opposed women's suffrage. In 1905, Lida's press work grew. She submitted 1,974 syndicate articles and pamphlets to newspapers, and fifteen special articles were written for the national press bureau and individual papers.

In addition to writing newspaper articles, state press superintendents wrote articles for the national press superintendent. Lida frequently contributed pieces to Babcock, so much so that she began to advocate for greater resources to help her meet press work demands. At the National American Woman Suffrage Association convention in Buffalo, New York, in 1908, Laura Clay recognized Lida's diligence for press work, given the increased number of newspapers on her contact list.

Lida used her talent as a writer to draft original articles to advocate for women's rights in other media. In 1898 Cosmopolitan published "Sally Ann's Experience." The story was reprinted in the Woman's Journal, the Ladies' Home Journal, and in international magazines and newspapers as far away as New Zealand, making the story familiar to people around the world. "Sally Ann's Experience" became the first story of Aunt Jane of Kentucky, a collection of short stories published in 1907. She followed up with The Land of Long Ago in 1909 and Clover and Blue Grass in 1916. Lida published a short novel, To Love and to Cherish, in 1911. In 1912, Lida wrote a book about the mountain weavers of Tennessee, Virginia, North Carolina, and Kentucky called "A Book of Hand-Woven Coverlets". The book, one of the first of its kind, detailed the designs and colors of the coverlets which aided in elevating the coverlets to be an art form.

== Aunt Jane ==
In literary circles, Lida was known by her pseudo name, Eliza Calvert Hall. In addition to her commentaries on women's suffrage written for Kentucky newspapers, she used many of her short stories to encode suffrage arguments. Those who read Aunt Jane of Kentucky, Lida's first published collection of short stories in 1907, observed the simple mountain wisdom of Aunt Jane without being fully aware of the political subtext contained within the stories. President Theodore Roosevelt even publicly praised Lida for this collection of short stories that featured an elderly widowed woman, "Aunt Jane," who told the experiences of the people in a rural southern town, named Goshen, to a younger woman visitor who relayed them to the reader. This type of rhetorical device, called a "double narrative," was a common form of storytelling in this era.

=== Rural southern dialect ===
In the era after the Civil War, magazines featured writers that told stories with regional dialects in local setting. Lida frequently used this style of storytelling in her writing. She was successful using this technique: The New York Times stated in their review of Aunt Jane of Kentucky that "Aunt Jane is not false, nor cheap, nor shallow, and the stories that are put in her mouth exhale the very breath of old gardens and county roads and fields."

=== Interests and themes ===
Melody Graulich in the Prologue to the 1990 reprint of Aunt Jane of Kentucky notes that Lida Obenchain has women's relationships as a major theme of her writing. The significance of female relationship is further reflected in her choice of her grandmother's maiden name and her own maiden name as her pen name.

Through Aunt Jane and the other characters in her stories, Lida tells of the problems facing women of her time with imagery and symbolism taken from the domestic arts of sewing, cooking, and gardening.

Lida portrays the social fabric of her rural southern region by using quilting metaphors in her stories. At the end of Aunt Jane's Album, the unnamed narrator concludes:

I looked again at the heap of quilts. An hour ago they had been patchwork, and nothing more. But now! The old woman's words had wrought a transformation in the homely mass of calico and silk and worsted. Patchwork? Ah, no! It was memory, imagination, history, biography, joy, sorrow, philosophy, religion, romance, realism, life, love, and death; and over all, like a halo, the love of the artist for his work and the soul's longing for earthly immortality.

== Life as a widow and death ==
William Obenchain died on August 17, 1916, after an extended illness. Family responsibilities caused her to move to Dallas, Texas to care for her daughter Margery, who had contracted tuberculosis. She continued to write, but her most productive years as a writer were past. After the death of her daughter in 1923, she stayed in Texas, where she died on December 20, 1935.
