= Elise Bennett Smith =

American suffragist (1871–1964)

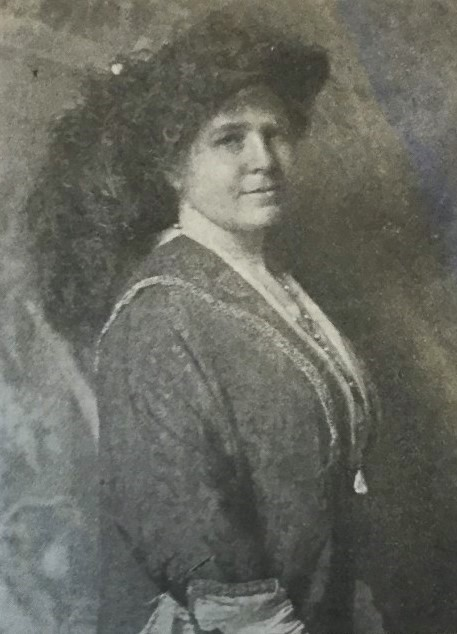
- Smith in 1917
- Born: September 9, 1871; Madison County, Kentucky, US
- Died: August 25, 1964 (aged 92); New York City, US
- Education: University of Michigan
- Occupations: Suffragist, clubwoman
- Spouse(s): Thomas Jefferson Smith (m. February 3, 1898); George David Jefferson (m. November 25, 1920); Alessandro Gagliardini (m. January 15, 1938)

Elise Clay Bennett Smith (September 9, 1871 – 1964) was President of the Kentucky Equal Rights Association from 1915 to 1916, and served as an Executive Committee member for the National American Woman Suffrage Association. Her last name changed several times as she married three men in succession: from her birth surname of Bennett she became Smith, then Jefferson, and finally Gagliardini.

== Early life, first marriage, and motherhood ==
Elise "Fanny" Clay Bennett was the second of six children of suffragists Sarah "Sallie" Lewis Clay Bennett (daughter of Mary Jane Warfield Clay) and James Bennett of Madison County, Kentucky. She was also the niece of several nationally known activists, including Mary Barr Clay, Laura Clay, and Belle Harris Bennett. She graduated from the University of Michigan in Ann Arbor, Michigan.

She married Thomas Jefferson Smith Jr. of Madison County, Kentucky, on February 3, 1898. They had two children together: Elise Bennett Smith Wenley and Thomas Jefferson Smith Jr.

By 1900, the Smiths were renting a house on Fourth Street in Richmond, Kentucky, while he worked as a lawyer. Elise was a housekeeper and taking care of their baby daughter, Elise (born 13 July 1899). Their son Thomas Jefferson Smith was also born in Madison County, Kentucky in 1904.

In 1912 the family moved to Frankfort, Kentucky since her husband had been appointed to a four-year post as a State Banking Commissioner which oversaw regulations of banking. As the niece of the widower Kentucky Governor James B. McCreary, she served as the hostess of gatherings at the executive mansion at Frankfort. She also served as the chairman of the promotion committee for the "Woman's Shop" at the Kentucky State Fair in Louisville in September 1915.

After her first husband died, she moved with her two children (Elise was 30 and Thomas 15) to a high society neighborhood of the St. James–Belgravia Historic District in Louisville, Kentucky, renting an apartment at Saint James Court. She was financially stable, holding stock in the Clay's Ferry Bridge Company.

== Club and suffrage activities ==
=== 1912 ===
Elise Bennett Smith, a member of the Daughters of the American Revolution, was elected President of Federation of Women's Clubs in Kentucky.

Confident of the Kentucky legislature in early 1912 passing school suffrage for Kentucky women (with educational qualification), she would start planning a campaign for full suffrage thereafter.

=== 1913 ===
She was appointed chairman of Kentucky Day at the National Conservation Exposition in Knoxville, Tennessee. She was also invited as a delegate to the fourth American Peace Congress, held at St. Louis, Missouri in May.

=== 1914 ===
Smith served as a founding member of the Woman's Forward Kentucky Movement, a campaign to support Cora Wilson Stewart's Illiteracy Commission and combat adult illiteracy in Kentucky.

=== 1915 ===
Still serving in the role of First Lady of Kentucky, Smith organized the Cotton Ball at the Capital Hotel in Frankfort, Kentucky as a fundraiser for the Kentucky Equal Rights Association (KERA) in February. In November at the KERA convention, she was elected president.

=== 1916 ===
As KERA president she recruited Senator Thomas A. Combs of Lexington to introduce a full suffrage bill in the Kentucky Senate; and, working from the McClure Building in Frankfort, Kentucky together with former KERA president Madeline McDowell Breckinridge she managed the distribution of literature to legislators on suffrage.

Smith invited suffragist Beatrice Forbes-Robertson Hale to speak on January 18, 1916, in the Kentucky Assembly. The legislature adjourned at noon to hear Hale speak and the galleries filled with women wearing sashes with "Votes for Women." Smith invited the Governor Augustus Owsley Stanley to attend. However, the Governor actively worked against the campaign, even as the bill for woman suffrage in Kentucky passed the Senate, and the bill died.

Smith was meanwhile elected state chairman of the Political Science Department of the Federation of Women's Clubs of Kentucky.

Her regional and national standing was strengthened when she presented at "Dixie Night" at the National American Woman Suffrage Association NAWSA convention in Atlantic City on September 7. She was being considered for NAWSA first auditor but was elected NAWSA corresponding secretary instead.

Carrie Chapman Catt chose for the new headquarters for NAWSA a historic home at 1626 Rhode Island Ave. NW owned by Mrs. Christian Hemmick; and Catt planned for Smith to live there as a member of the NAWSA Executive Board assigned to the work of local organization. Her daughter Elise joined her there as she worked at the NAWSA national headquarters. Smith and Laura Clay represented Kentucky at the Susan B. Anthony memorial program at the NAWSA headquarters.

=== 1917 ===
Smith had stepped down as president in order to live in Washington and work for NAWSA. When she moved back to Kentucky, she stayed active in organizing the woman suffrage campaign by serving as the KERA corresponding secretary.

== Leaving politics ==
In the summers of 1920 and 1922, she and her two children, daughter Elise and son Thomas Jr., traveled throughout Europe for the purpose of "recreation and education." On the ship over to Europe she met George David Jefferson of London; she was on her way to France to undertake "reconstruction work in the devasted [sic] regions of France under the direction of Miss Anna Morgan, of New York."

On November 25, 1920, she married George David Jefferson, a retired secretary (age 58), of Oxford, England. Jefferson was originally from Hamilton, Ontario, Canada and had worked in Ayer, Massachusetts as the school secretary at Groton School. They were lived with his daughter Miss R.M. Jefferson in London and traveled to the U.S. often. While living in England, they also traveled to Italy in 1923 and Algeria in 1925. They had settled in Rome, Italy when they left in December 1930 to live at 380 Riverside Drive, New York, New York. George Jefferson died in England in July 1932.

At the age of 66 and with her brother Warfield C. Bennett as a witness, she married an Italian investment broker, Alessandro Gagliardini, on January 15, 1938, in Manhattan, New York; and, he petitioned for his naturalization papers that day. They lived at 1212 Fifth Avenue in New York, New York. They often traveled to Italy where they would stay half the year.

== Death ==
She died in New York on August 25, 1964.

== See also ==
- Kentucky Equal Rights Association
- National American Woman Suffrage Association
