= John Rolfe Gardiner =

American novelist

- Born: 1936 (age 89–90); US
- Occupations: Novelist, short-story author
- Writing career
- Period: 1974–present
- Notable work: Somewhere in France

John Rolfe Gardiner (born 1936) is an American author of several novels and short stories.

== Life and career ==
He is best known for his novel Somewhere in France (1999), aside from which he has written four other novels and two short-story collections. Sixteen of his stories were published in The New Yorker; others were published in The American Scholar and in other publications. His short story "The Voyage Out" was anthologized in The Best American Short Stories. His work was awarded the Lila Wallace Reader's Digest Writers Award and the O. Henry Award.

Gardiner's stories often take place in his native Virginia, but also in various places in Europe, most prominently in France. His work has received vast critical acclaim:

Elegantly written, this funny, poignant gem of a book..

— Publishers Weekly, on In the Heart of the Whole World

This is an abundant work that you'll want to read more than once

— Library Journal, on In the Heart of the Whole World

There is something tantalizingly sinister about Gardiner's short stories: a hint of intrigue and a soupcon of the illicit connect them all... Haunting fare from a master storyteller, richly evocative and thought provoking

— Carol Haggas, on The Magellan House

Gardiner is a wonderfully distinctive writer whose often funny stories are animated by a healing, intelligent compassion for characters groping for redemption in a heartless world

— Publishers Weekly, on The Incubator Ballroom

Gardiner lives in Middleburg, Virginia, with his artist wife Joan. They have one daughter, Nicola.

== Bibliography ==
=== Novels ===
- Great Dream From Heaven (1974)
- Unknown Soldiers (1977)
- In The Heart Of The Whole World (1988)
- Somewhere In France (1999)
- Double Stitch (2003)
- Newport Rising (2017)

=== Short story collections ===
- Going On Like This (1983)
- The Incubator Ballroom (1991)
- The Magellan House (2004)
