= Josephine Henry =

American women's rights leader, suffragist, social reformer and writer

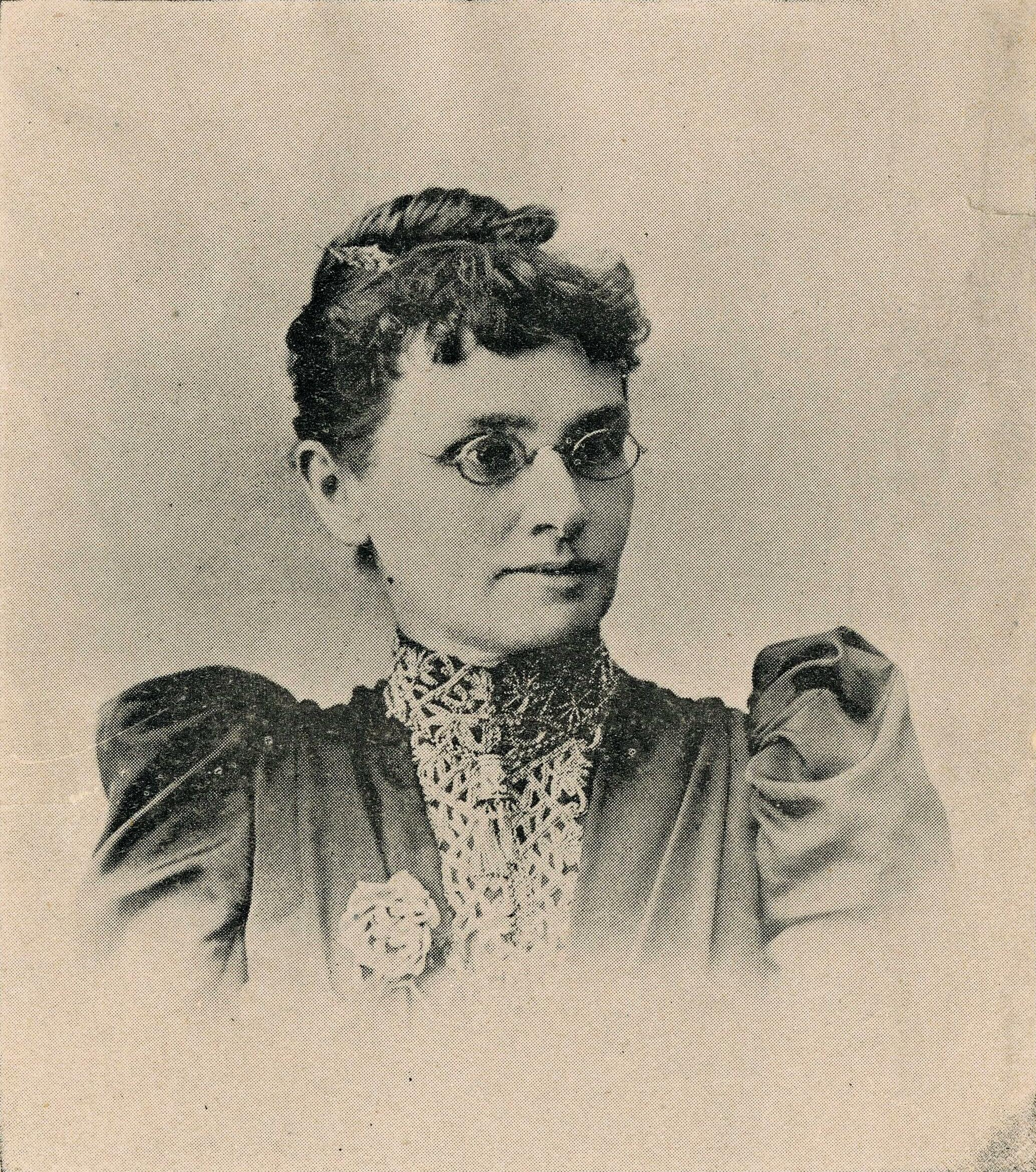
Josephine Henry in 1898

Josephine Kirby Henry (February 22, 1846 – January 8, 1928) was an American Progressive Era women's rights leader, suffragist, social reformer, and writer from Versailles, Kentucky in the United States. Henry was a strong advocate for women and was a leading proponent of legislation that would grant married women property rights. Henry lobbied hard for the adoption of the Kentucky 1894 Married Woman's Property Act, and is credited for being instrumental in its passage. Henry was the first woman to campaign publicly for a statewide office in Kentucky.

== Family and early life ==
Josephine Kirby Williamson was born into the wealthy Williamson family in Newport in northern Kentucky. She was 15 when her family moved to Versailles. She gave piano lessons and taught at the Versailles Academy for Ladies. In March 1868 Josephine married Captain (C.S.A.) William Henry of Versailles, Kentucky. After their marriage they resided in Versailles and both were heavily involved in local and state community affairs. Together they had one son, Frederick V. Henry (born in 1868), who died in a railroad accident near Chicago in 1891 while working as a writer for Chicago Inter Ocean.

== Women's rights activity ==
Whatever their social station, at the time of Henry's birth, women in Kentucky had many responsibilities but few rights. The situation was worse for married women who after marriage legally were considered as conjoined with the husband into one person and had few legal protections from their husbands' actions. Married women had few rights in critical economic statuses such as the ownership of property or in making a will. Women had no right to their own wages, no legal protections for the physical safety of their own bodies in domestic altercations, and often had no right to interfere in their husbands' decisions about their children.

Henry dedicated many years of her life to working to gain equal rights for women. Her writing, speeches, and organizational skills are noted in the records and reports of the national and local organization, news accounts of events, and official Kentucky state records. As an example, Eugenia B. Farmer's report of Kentucky suffrage activities to the 1893 National American Woman Suffrage Association Convention stated that Henry had lectured throughout the state, delivered fifteen lectures, kept up a department in the Southern Journal, wrote fifty-six articles for other papers.

=== Kentucky Equal Rights Association ===
In 1888, Laura Clay and Henry founded the Kentucky Equal Rights Association to expand and revitalize the suffrage movement in Kentucky. The Association fought for Progressive Era social reform including women's rights to vote in all local, state and national elections; a married women's right to own her own property or make a will or a contract in her own legal standing, and have control over her wages or earnings from her own business.

=== 1894 Kentucky Married Woman's Property Act ===
By the last decade of the nineteenth century, Kentucky was the only state in which marriage effectively denied women of their basic human and civil rights. The Married Woman's Property Act, also called the Husband and Wife Bill during the years under debate when the draft was castigated as anti-family and infringing on cultural norms about women's honor as ladies, passed in 1894. Though the Kentucky General Assembly narrowly constructed the bill to give married women the some general rights to own property in Kentucky, this was an important milestone in the campaign for women's rights, including the franchise. Henry saw this as critical for the establishment of women's economic independence and the self-efficacy needed for an informed citizenry to vote in a constructive way.

== Writer ==
Henry was a prolific writer who wrote hundreds of newspaper articles, speeches, and editorials—many of which were reprinted in newspapers throughout the country. In addition to writing the opinion pieces, she wrote longer monographs. The two most famous of her pamphlets were both published in 1905: Marriage and Divorce and Woman and the Bible.

Henry also wrote poems, and is best remembered for The Old Town Clock and A Parody On 'Comin' Thro' The Rye'.

== Political campaigns ==
Henry was the Prohibition Party candidate for clerk of the Kentucky Court of Appeals in 1890 and 1894, and was the first woman in the South to run in a public campaign for a state office. A few years later, Henry was nominated for Superintendent of Public Instruction. On November 14, 1897, Henry declared her willingness to be nominated as the Prohibition Party candidate for president. The New York Times picked up the story out of Versailles, Kentucky and listed her platform's main ideas:

- the enfranchisement of American women
- free coinage of silver
- recognition of Cuban independence
- pension reform
- reduction of Federal offices
- a non-partisan tariff committee
- a law making lobbying a penal offense
- the abolition of the liquor traffic

The brief article ended abruptly with the most caustic of statements: "Mrs. Henry is an agnostic. She thinks Thanksgiving Day should be abolished and that no reference to God should be made in the Constitution."

== Freethinker and agnostic ==
Henry was active in freethought organizations such as the Freethought Federation of America and the American Secular Union.

Her most controversial project was her work with Elizabeth Cady Stanton and a group of women's rights activists on criticizing the new translations in the Anglicans' Bible, better known as the King James Bible, which was being revised for the first time in the 1880s since the Authorized Version of 1611. The Woman's Bible was written by activists who were not Biblical scholars themselves but who fervently challenged the nineteenth century's traditional Judeo-Christian interpretations of women and women's roles. Henry served on the internationally renowned Revising Committee, a group of women from Europe and the U.S. who drafted commentary on the 1888 Revised Version of the Bible published by the Church of England. The Woman's Bible was broadly criticized in reviews, editorials, and from the pulpit. Suffragist organizations moved to distance their groups from 'The Women's Bible and the women closely associated with the book. Her openly espoused views on religion, marriage, and divorce caused a split between Henry and her longtime friend, Laura Clay, as well as many other women in the Kentucky Equal Rights Association around the turn of the century - causing her to be banned from any further Association meetings.

== Recognition and legacy ==
In 1920, Henry was given a "Pioneer Distinguished Service" certificate by the National American Woman Suffrage Association.

== Death ==
After a stroke in December 1927, Josephine Henry died in Versailles, Kentucky at age 84 on January 8, 1928.

== See also ==
- List of suffragists and suffragettes
- Laura Clay
- Kentucky Equal Rights Association
- National American Woman Suffrage Association
- Prohibition Party
- The Woman's Bible
