= Virginia Pollard Robinson =

American suffragist

Virginia Pollard Robinson (September 6, 1883 – June 28, 1977) was an American suffragist, educator, and professor of social work. She served as Associate and Vice Dean of the School of social work at the University of Pennsylvania. Her writing on casework and supervisory practices in social work was influential in her field.

== Biography ==
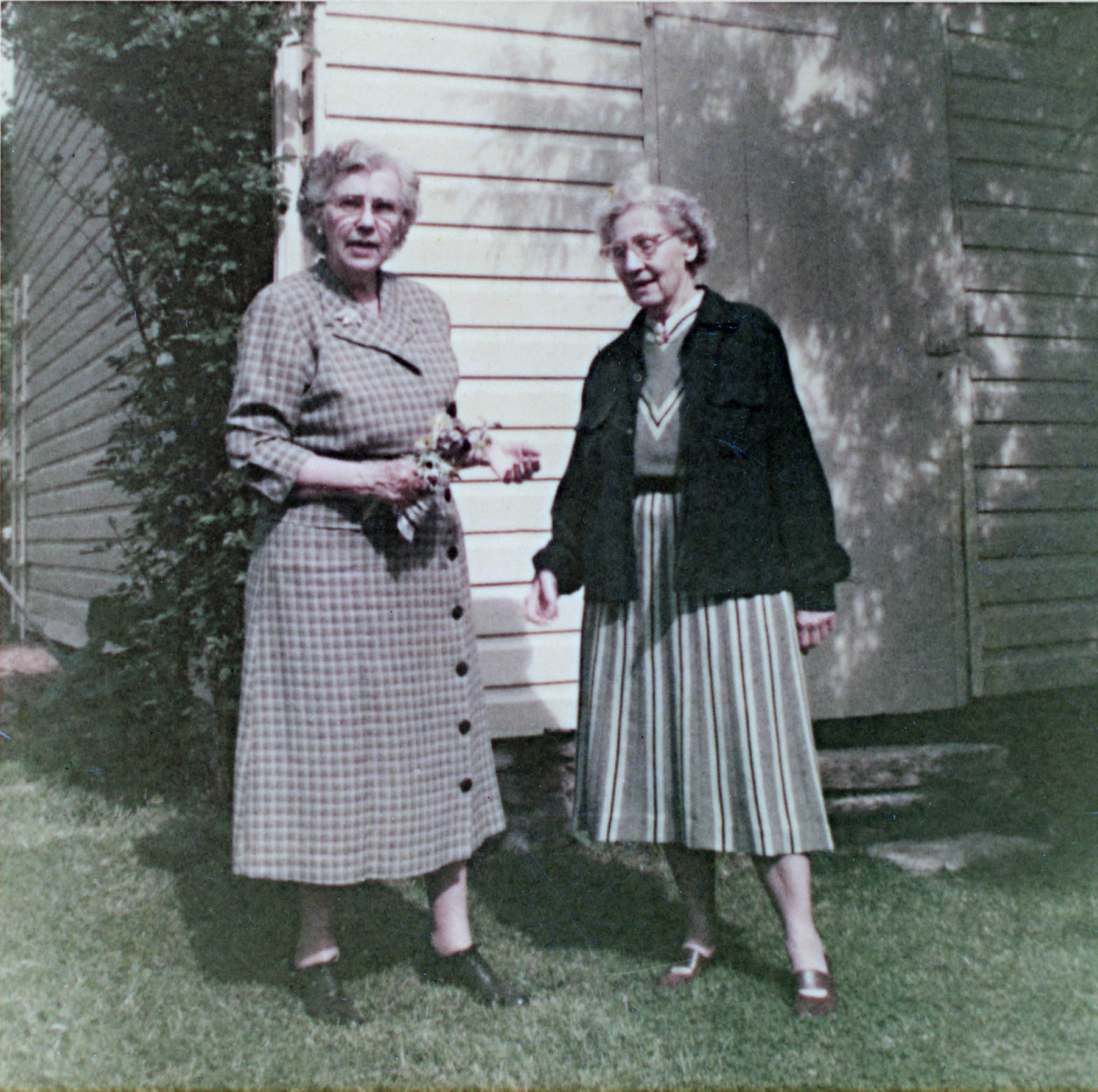
Jessie Taft and Virginia Robinson

Robinson was born on September 6, 1883, in Louisville, Kentucky. She graduated from Bryn Mawr College with a Bachelor of Arts in 1906 and a Master of Arts in 1907. After college, she taught English in high school for a number of years in Louisville. In 1908, she enrolled in the University of Chicago for the summer, where she met Jessie Taft. Robinson and Taft would be lifelong companions. They would later settle in Flourtown, Pennsylvania where they adopted and raised two children together.

Robinson was a women's suffrage activist in Kentucky. She was a member of the Collegiate Equal Suffrage League and a driving member of the Louisville Woman's Suffrage Association (LWSA). In 1909, she urged women to join up with current suffrage groups at an event held with Madeline McDowell Breckinridge.

Robinson went to work in New York to study "criminal psychology" at Bedford reformatory in 1912. In 1918, Robinson became a staff member of the University of Pennsylvania's School of Social Work. The next year, she became the school's Associate Director and was named Acting Director in 1936. Robinson earned a doctorate in sociology from the University of Pennsylvania in 1931. She was further recognized with an honorary doctorate of science and social work from Penn in 1959. She also served as Associate Dean and Vice Dean. Robinson retired in 1952.

Taft died on June 7, 1960, and Robinson wrote her biography in 1962. Robinson died after a heart attack in Doylestown, Pennsylvania on June 28, 1977. The School of Social Work at the University of Pennsylvania awards the Virginia P. Robinson prize annually for outstanding student essays. The award was first established in 1946.

== Work and writing ==
Robinson and Jessie Taft promoted the ideas of Otto Rank. Robinson's work focused on social work theory where she advocated for centering the client's needs. She was also interested in child welfare. Her writing in the field of social work supervision and casework process was influential and many of her textbooks were "widely used," according to the National Association of Social Workers

Robinson's sociology dissertation, "A Changing Psychology in Social Work Case" (1931) was considered an immediate sensation in social work education. Her work here helped lay the ground for the functional school of social work. A Changing Psychology in Social Case Work (1931) was favorably reviewed in The Courier-Journal where the book was called "a remarkable contribution to the already long list of volumes dealing with the subject of social case work." Robinson's textbook, Supervision in Social Casework: A Problem in Professional Education (1936), addressed supervision in social work contexts and led to a renewed treatment of the subject. She expanded her work on supervision in social work with the 1949 book The Dynamics of Supervision Under Functional Controls: A Professional Process in Social Casework.
