= Virginia Penny =

American social reformer and economist

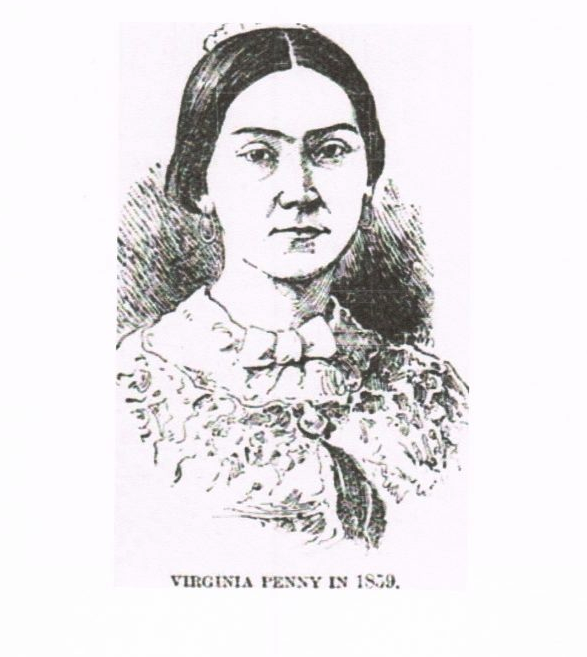
- Born: January 18, 1826; Louisville, Kentucky
- Died: April 4, 1913 (aged 87); Manhattan State Hospital on Wards Island in New York City
- Occupations: suffragist and economist
- Known for: author and first to study women's labor markets, social reformer, leader of the American women's suffrage movement

Virginia Penny (January 18, 1826 – April 4, 1913) was a social reformer and an economist, being the first to study women's labor markets both in the U.S. and in Europe. Her books were an important resource for the members of the newly formed American Social Science Association. She also served as an early leader of the American women's suffrage movement before coming more involved in labor union organization and running her own employment agency for women.

== Early life and publishing career ==
The eldest daughter of Rachel Ruble and William Penny of Louisville, Kentucky, Virginia Penny was born on January 18, 1826, into a slaveowning family. Her father served as a city councilman and also co-founded the Louisville Savings Bank. At least three of her four brothers played a large role in her later life:

- William - graduated from University of Louisville with a medical degree in 1872, died at home in Brooklyn, New York on January 21, 1914, at the age of 83
- Alexander - also a doctor, lived on a farm near Louisville with his mother after his father's death, and died in December 1876
- Icilius - worked as a farmhand in Alton, Illinois, where he was abused and starved when his sister found him there in the 1880s

After attending for two years, Penny graduated in 1845 from the Steubenville Female Seminary, run by the Presbyterians in Ohio. She taught there, in Illinois and Kentucky; and she served as the principal of the Female Department at Van Rensselaer Academy in Missouri. By the late 1850s, she had traveled to several big cities in the U.S. to study women's jobs and she used libraries to find information about European women. She lived in New York City from 1859 to 1861 to finalize her research and to publish what became the first publication of what jobs were open to women and what wages they might earn. Penny used a systemmatic research method to interview thousands of employers and workers. She used in-person interviews as well as mail-in survey questionnaires, ending up with 533 listings in the first version of her book: How women can make money married or single, in all branches of the arts and sciences, professions, trades, agricultural and mechanical pursuits (Philadelphia, 1862). Her unique book is the first of its kind to present not only the kinds of jobs in which women were employed then, but also those where, by reason of gender discrimination, they could have worked but were not employed in great numbers. Her thematic essays accompanying the lists of jobs included her analysis of the effects of the job on the health of its laborforce, the typical wages (and gender differentials), the length of the working day, as well as qualifications and length of training for a particular type of job. The book's intended audience, women seeking employment, was encouraged to explore ways by which to be job-ready and to not give up when first turned away because of gender discrimination.

Given the lack of advertisement of Penny's book (self-published using her inheritance), it was not widely distributed. The next year, she sold the printing plates and her rights to her book to a new publisher for $100. Walker, Wise and Company in Boston republished it in 1863 under a new title: The Employments of Women: A Cyclopaedia of Woman's Work. This version of the book was widely distributed and reviewed in scholarly as well as general literary works (see for example the review by Burwell N. Carter of Williamstown, Kentucky in The Land We Love (August, 1867)). In her preface to her 1863 book, she writes:

I desire to present to those interested a clear and succinct view of the conditions of business in the United States, the openings for entering into business, the vacancies women may fill and the crowded marts they may avoid, the qualifications needed for a selected pursuit, and the pursuits to which they are best adapted; also the probable result pecuniarily of each calling honorably pursued: in short it is intended as a business manual for women.

Another reviewer in 1869 agreed that the book is a useful, practical tool for women: "Miss Penny has earned the sober gratitude of women, and men interested in the lot of women, by the labors of many years in the hardest and least remunerative fields of service. She is no orator, politician, or manager, but a delving, drudging worker ... Miss Penny's style is not especially brilliant or attractive, but is interesting; and better than all, her essays are sober, wise, and important." The book was republished many times over the years; and, in 1867, the book was adapted and translated into German.

In May 1867, Penny attended the second convention of the American Equal Rights Association (AERA) where she was elected as the Kentucky representative among the vice-presidents. Her reputation for her work and ideas for women's rights had been firmly established by then and she joined a global network of activists working for women's suffrage as well as equal rights for all. She participated in union activities, including the Workingwoman's Association in New York and led protests for women's wages and living conditions. She opened an employment agency and gave public lectures to encourage women to explore the many different fields in which they could work and get paid. At one point she also worked for the U.S. Census Bureau.

Penny's second book, Think and Act: A Series of Articles Pertaining to Men and Women, Work and Wages was published in 1869. This was a compilation of her speeches and articles, giving a more in-depth economic analysis of the status of women laborers and here she laid out her solutions that place her firmly in the school of feminist economists and social theorists who follow in her footsteps many decades later. She advocated for married women's property rights and wrote of the use-value of women in the domestic sphere in a time when most authors spoke primarily of the moral issues of domesticity. She sought to make her book useful for social reformers, including suffragists, lobbying their municipal, state and federal legislators: "If what is said be the means of making plan the path of duty, or assisting any one in the cause to which it is devoted, it will have accomplished its mission (5)."

Penny was a founding member of the Kentucky Woman Suffrage Association when it was first formed in 1881 right after a convention of the American Woman Suffrage Association in Louisville, Kentucky. This group was the first suffrage organization to represent a state in the South.

At one point in her later life, Penny organized the funding for and managed an employment agency in the American Bible Society's Bible House located between Third and Fourth Avenues, at Ninth Street in New York City. She included as part of her services a lecture series on the jobs available to women in the city.

== Decline in fortune and death ==
Penny was in Cincinnati in the 1870s, and she wrote: "my health bad, and my means limited." Her brothers' fight over their inheritance led to an inquest in 1874, during which—for unknown reasons—the judge committed her against her will to Anchorage Asylum, a psychiatric hospital near Louisville. She became destitute by the 1880s, having lost her inheritance as well as her books' publishing rights, and regular calls for monetary support went out across the country as she traveled to different cities (see for example her 1885 broadside To the Voters of Jefferson County while she was in Louisville and a report from the New York Times in 1902 when she was living in poverty in a tenement in New York City). Meanwhile, her brother William, a doctor and professor in Galveston, Texas, had moved to New York and opened the Penny Dispensary on Long Island. While William was living in Brooklyn, she was committed to the Manhattan State Hospital on Wards Island where she finally died nearly 20 years later.

== Works ==
- How women can make money married or single, in all branches of the arts and sciences, professions, trades, agricultural and mechanical pursuits (Philadelphia, 1862); republished in 1863 in Boston by Walker, Wise & Company under the new title, The Employments of Women: A Cyclopaedia of Woman's Work.
- Think and Act: A Series of Articles Pertaining to Men and Women, Work and Wages (Philadelphia, 1869).
- To the Voters of Jefferson County (Louisville, January 1885)

== See also ==
- American Equal Rights Association
- List of feminist economists

== Bibliography ==
- "A Woman's Sacrifice: Miss Virginia Penny's Labors on Behalf of the Members of her Sex—What She Found Women Could Do". The Chicago Sunday Herald. July 10, 1887.
- Gensemer, Susan H. (January 2000). "Virginia Penny". In Dimand, Robert W.; Dimand, Mary Ann; Forget, Evelyn L. (eds.). A Biographical Dictionary of Women Economists. Edward Elgar Pub. ISBN 1-85278-964-6.
- Herringshow, Thomas William (1909–1914). Herringshaw's national library of American biography : contains thirty-five thousand biographies of the acknowledged leaders of life and thought of the United States; illustrated with three thousand vignette portraits. Chicago, IL: American Publishers' Association.
- Holloway, Pippa (Winter 2023). "Virginia Penny's "State of Desperation": Anger, Insanity, And Struggles For Justice In Nineteenth-Century Kentucky". Ohio Valley History. 23 (4): 3–32..
- Koster, Joan Bouza (April 29, 2012). "Virginia Penny On Women's Employment". Women, Words, and Wisdom. Wordpress.
- "Our American Sisters". English Woman's Journal. XI: 204–9. 1863.
- "Review of Employments of Women". New York Times. January 25, 1863. p. 2.
- "Reviews". The Nation. November 18, 1869. cited in Tardy, Mary T., ed. (1872). "Virginia Penny". The Living Female Writers of the South. Philadelphia: Claxton, Remsen & Haffelfinger. pp. 67–68.
- "Woman Work in Want: Miss Virginia Penny, Who Spent a Fortune for Her Sex, In a Helpless Condition". New York Times. August 1, 1902. p. 5.
