= Kentucky Equal Rights Association =

First permanent women's rights organization in Kentucky

Kentucky Equal Rights Association (KERA)
- Minutes of the 1894 annual convention of the Kentucky Equal Rights Association.
- Founded: 1888
- Founder: suffragists from Fayette and Kenton counties, including Laura Clay and Henrietta Chenault
- Purpose: Women's rights, married women's property rights, feminism, school suffrage, temperance, admitting women to higher education, juvenile defense rights, raising the age of consent
- Location: Lexington, Kentucky
- Key people: Mary Barr Clay, Laura Clay, Madeline McDowell Breckinridge

Kentucky Equal Rights Association (KERA) was the first permanent statewide women's rights organization in Kentucky. Founded in November 1888, the KERA voted in 1920 to transmute itself into the Kentucky League of Women Voters to continue its many and diverse progressive efforts on behalf of women's rights.

Inspired by Lucy Stone during the national meeting of the American Woman Suffrage Association in Louisville in 1881, a group of suffragists formed the Kentucky Woman Suffrage Association, the first statewide suffrage organization in the South. Laura Clay served as president with affiliate groups in Louisville, Lexington and Richmond. Laura's older sister, Mary Barr Clay (vice-president for both Elizabeth Cady Stanton's National Woman Suffrage Association as well as of Stone's American Woman Suffrage Association) hosted Susan B. Anthony in Richmond in 1879 to speak on the need for economic protections for women. She then founded the Madison County Equal Rights Association, the state's first permanent women's rights association. Soon afterward, Mary B. Clay invited Lucy Stone to stay at her mother Mary Jane Warfield Clay's house in Lexington, and Stone mentored the creation of the Fayette County Equal Suffrage Association (later the Fayette County Equal Rights Association).

In November 1888, Lucy Stone invited Laura Clay to present a paper at the AWSA convention in Cincinnati. Clay agreed and invited all the Kentucky suffragists to join her there to organize a new statewide association. On November 22, 1888, delegates from Fayette and Kenton counties joined the four daughters of the former abolitionist Cassius M. Clay – Anne, Sally, Mary and Laura – to create the Kentucky Equal Rights Association (KERA). Though Cassius Clay strongly condemned the woman suffrage movement on moral, political and scientific grounds, his daughters led the movement for women's right to vote as well as for legal, educational and industrial rights for women.

The KERA adopted the Fayette County Equal Rights Association's broad platform of reform rather than focusing only on women's voting rights. The founding officers were: president, Laura Clay; vice presidents, Ellen Battelle Dietrick and Mary Barr Clay; corresponding secretary, Eugenia B. Farmer; recording secretary, Anna M. Deane; and treasurer. Isabella H. Shepard. They adopted the slogan "If ye abide in my word....ye shall know the Truth and the Truth shall make you free." The leadership with only 66 members quickly organized campaigns with lectures and lobbying, writing petitions, newspaper columns and pamphlets, as well as organizing affiliate chapters around the state. They also encouraged women to enroll in institutions of higher education, hoping to achieve absolute equality in every profession. In 1890 a KERA petition presented to the Kentucky legislature was supported by 10,000 signatures, and by 1895 KERA membership rose to 400 members.

== List of KERA Presidents ==
Laura Clay (1849–1941) of Lexington and Madison County elected president in 1881 of the Kentucky Woman Suffrage Association, an affiliate of the American Woman Suffrage Association and first of any state in the South
Madeline McDowell Breckinridge (1872–1920) of Lexington - elected president of KERA 1912–1915
Elise Bennett Smith (1871–1964) of Frankfort and Louisville - elected president of KERA 1915–1916
Christine Bradley South (1879–1957) of Frankfort - elected president of KERA 1916–1919
Madeline McDowell Breckinridge of Lexington - returns to KERA presidency 1919–1920

== Campaigns by KERA ==
=== Partial suffrage and running for elective office ===
An important strategy undertaken by suffrage activists was to seek partial suffrage on the path to full suffrage for women. Kentucky had already pointed the way for this strategy when in 1838 a statewide law passed protecting the right of female taxpaying heads-of-households in rural areas to vote on matters related to the new common school system. Eugenia B. Farmer of Kenton County Equal Rights Association alerted the state leaders of the possibility of inserting school suffrage into the new charters for second class cities in Kentucky, specifically in Lexington, Newport and Covington. The legislature allowed for this, in 1894, for all women in those three cities to have the right to vote in local school board elections and educational matters. By then, women in fifteen other states had successfully lobbied for legislation for partial suffrage (or full suffrage in the case of some Western territories and states). Women participated in annual elections from 1895 to 1901 when a large number of African American women in Lexington registered to vote. Only half of those registrants ended up casting a vote – leading to the election of a Democratic Party ticket that year. However, the disproportionality of potential black women voters threatened the racially conservative norm. Despite the aggressive petitioning and lobbying by a coalition of white women's groups to keep it, the legislature rescinded the partial suffrage law in Kentucky in January 1902. Finally, after much lobbying and petitioning by KERA and other women's clubs, the legislature passed a law in 1912 that gave "qualified" women the right to vote and run for office in the new county school system. This law was tested in the courts and stood, allowing for state protection of the right for black and white women citizens to vote. Five white women won elections for school superintendent in 1913.

=== Economic protection ===
The KERA organized several campaigns to change the laws regarding women's financial dependency and economic rights. In 1894 Governor John Y. Brown signed the Married Woman's Property Act, spearheaded by Josephine K. Henry. Women consigned to asylums in the state gained strong advocates when, by 1898, the Kentucky legislators agreed with the KERA that all state asylums should have women physicians.

=== Women and higher education ===
Due to the continued pressure by the Kentucky Equal Rights Association, in 1880 the Kentucky Agricultural and Mechanical College was the first college in Kentucky to begin admitting women. The Louisville College of Pharmacy started enrolling women in 1890. The Fayette County Equal Rights Association recruited women to enroll there, and meanwhile lobbied the leaders of Transylvania University, which finally opened its doors to women in 1889. In rapid succession other central Kentucky colleges became co-educational.

=== Temperance ===
Before the creation of the KERA, Laura Clay and Henrietta Chenault of Lexington planned a lecture tour by the popular Zerelda G. Wallace of the Women's Christian Temperance Union, who would include the less popular topic of woman's suffrage in her speeches. The idea was to assure conservative locals that giving women the right to vote would guarantee victory for prohibition as well as other social improvements.

=== Child labor laws ===
As part of their efforts to protect children, especially those living in poverty and victims of domestic violence, the KERA lobbied for and won legislation in 1896 to establish reform schools for both girls and boys. By the turn of the century, Kentucky established juvenile courts that treated children differently in the justice system. The KERA won Kentucky's child labor law, despite the agrarian and mining business interests, and raised the age of consent from 12 to 16.

== Campaign for Federal Amendment Protecting Full Suffrage for Women ==
The National American Woman Suffrage Association, determined to impress Southern legislators with the urgency of their cause, decided to tour the South. In 1894, Susan B. Anthony and Carrie Chapman Catt started out from Lexington, Kentucky, on their tour and stopped in Wilmore, Louisville, Owensboro (where they formed a local club for the KERA) and Paducah. From there, Anthony and Catt spoke in Tennessee, Louisiana, Mississippi, Alabama, South Carolina and Virginia. Many Kentucky women activists held leadership roles in all the national organizations.

By 1910, the woman suffrage issue had become more fashionable and big donors had created larger coffers from which state and national suffrage organizations could draw for lobbying and extended publicity campaigns. The KERA constitution was amended in 1910 to make the term for presidency three years and no longer allow an incumbent to win a succeeding term. Laura Clay, who had continuously won election as president since the founding of KERA, stepped down in 1912. Madeline McDowell Breckinridge, a strong Progressive reformer, was elected to serve until 1915; she also served as second vice-president of the NAWSA. On January 14, 1914, Breckinridge and Clay addressed the Kentucky legislature in joint session in celebration of the woman's suffrage bills finally moving out of committee.

The daughter of Sarah "Sallie" Clay (later Bennett) and niece of Laura Clay, Elise Bennett Smith, won the presidency in 1915. She served for one year then moved on to work for the national association. Her term was carried out by Christine Bradley South, and then Breckinridge was elected president again in 1919.

=== Nineteenth Amendment ===
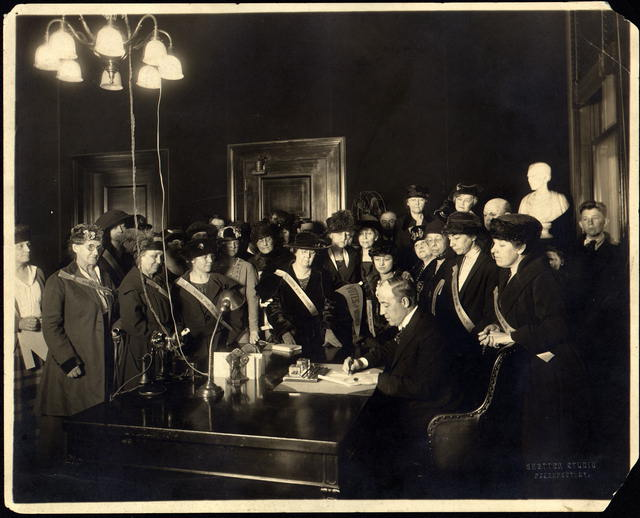
Kentucky Governor Edwin P. Morrow signs the ratification bill for Kentucky, January 6, 1920, with members of the Kentucky Equal Rights Association overseeing.

When the U.S. Senate finally approved a federal amendment for woman suffrage on June 4, 1919, Laura Clay resigned from the KERA. In a public debate with KERA President Breckinridge, Clay argued that the KERA had made an error in abandoning efforts for a state law for presidential suffrage, which was needed to be consistent with the Kentucky constitution.

During contentious debate, the Kentucky General Assembly approved ratification of the Nineteenth Amendment by a vote of 72 to 25 in the House and 30 to 8 in the Senate. The KERA members were present as Governor Edwin P. Morrow signed the ratification bill on January 6, 1920. Kentucky was the 23rd state, one of only four Southern states, to approve the proposed amendment, which became law on August 26, 1920.

== Rise of the League of Women Voters ==
At the 30th annual meeting, held in early January 1920, the KERA membership voted that as soon as the ratification of the federal amendment was complete, the Kentucky Equal Rights Association should transmute itself into a Kentucky League of Women Voters. This finally happened on December 15, 1920.

== See also ==
- Emma Guy Cromwell
- Eliza Calvert Obenchain
- Daughters of the American Revolution
- Equal Rights Amendment
- League of Women Voters
