= Eugenia B. Farmer =

American suffragist and abolitionist (1835)

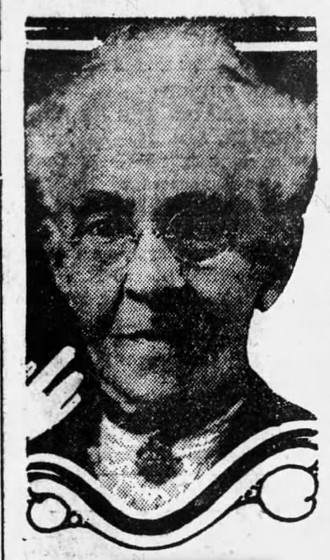
- Born: Eugenia Barrett; April 8, 1835; Cincinnati, Ohio, US
- Died: October 3, 1924 (aged 89); Saint Paul, Minnesota, US
- Education: Oberlin College
- Occupation: Suffragist
- Organization: National American Woman Suffrage Association

Eugenia B. Farmer (1835–1924) was an American suffragist and abolitionist. She was a leader in the movements for women's voting rights in the state of Kentucky, and a co-founder of the Kenton County Equal Rights Association.

== Life and work ==
Farmer was born on April 8, 1835, in Cincinnati, Ohio. Her parents (Emma Hubbard Barrett and Edmund Berniaud) were also members of the anti-slavery abolitionist movement. In the 1850s she attended Oberlin College where she met her husband Henry C. Farmer, a railroad worker. In 1858 their son Edmund Farmer was born, however he later died in 1861 at the age of 3. Later that year, she began working at a Union hospital during the American civil war. Whilst working at the hospital, she met fellow suffragist Susan B. Anthony, with whom she attended 12 National Suffragist Conventions together. After the civil war, she moved to Covington, Kentucky before settling in St. Paul, Minnesota. Whilst living in Covington, she partnered with Isabella Shepard to help found the Kenton County Equal Rights Association. Their work led to an amendment in Kentucky's constitution that allowed limited voting rights for women. In 1918, she published a memoir titled, "A Voice from the Civil War", detailing her and her husband's experiences during the Reconstruction era.

== Memorial ==
On June 11, 2022, a plaque was placed at a church in St. Paul by the William G. Pomeroy Foundation. The church (Trinity Episcopal Church) was the site of one of the suffrage conventions she attended with Susan B. Anthony in 1897.
