= Kentucky Federation of Women's Clubs =

United States Clubs

The Kentucky Federation of Women's Clubs (KFWC) is a community and civic umbrella organization for women in Kentucky. It was founded in 1894 and is affiliated with the General Federation of Women's Clubs (GFWC). The KFWC helped bring about various reforms in Kentucky and expanded educational opportunities to citizens.

== About ==
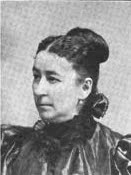
Cornelia O. Hansford, past president of the Kentucky Federation of Women's Clubs

The Kentucky Federation of Women's Clubs (KFWC) was created in July 1894, when several women met in Lexington to form the group. It was the fourth state federation of women's clubs to become affiliated with the General Federation of Women's Clubs (GFWC). The club has held annual meetings since the first one in 1985 at Richmond. By 1898, the KFWC had thirty clubs it represented throughout the state. In 1909, there were 85 different organizations in the KFWC. By 1921, there were 150 clubs and around 16,000 individual clubwomen. These women were white and were generally upper-class to middle class.

KFWC has been headquartered in Louisville since 1954. Prior to the creation of the club building, important papers for the KFWC had traveled with the president of the organization.

The group has recently changed its name to the General Federation of Women's Clubs Kentucky. The organization's current departments are education, art, conservation, home life, international affairs and public affairs.

=== Reform efforts ===
One of the first projects the KFWC was involved with was to work on education through libraries. The KFWC took over operations of the traveling library that had been started by the Louisville Monday Afternoon Club in 1887. In 1910, after the KFWC persuaded the state to create a public organization for libraries, the traveling and public libraries in Kentucky were turned over to the new Kentucky Library Commission. Later, the KFWC helped provide books for the pack horse libraries in the late 1930s.

KFWC was involved in reforming the school system in Kentucky. In the early 1900s, there was no compulsory education in Kentucky and a high rate of illiteracy. The education committee of the KFWC created reports on the status of Kentucky's education system. These reports were shared with newspapers and used to influence citizens and politicians. In 1908, legislation was finally passed to support schools financially in Kentucky. By 1909, KFWC was urging citizens to vote for women to serve on school boards.

KFWC was involved in conservation of natural land. KFWC was involved in preserving Mammoth Caves. Members on the conservation committee have spoken out against strip mining in Kentucky. KFWC helped to establish the Kentucky Society for the Prevention of Blindness. They were also involved with backing the creation of the Frontier Nursing Service. KFWC was also involved in the fight for women's suffrage.
