= Bibliography of Henry Clay =

Henry Clay
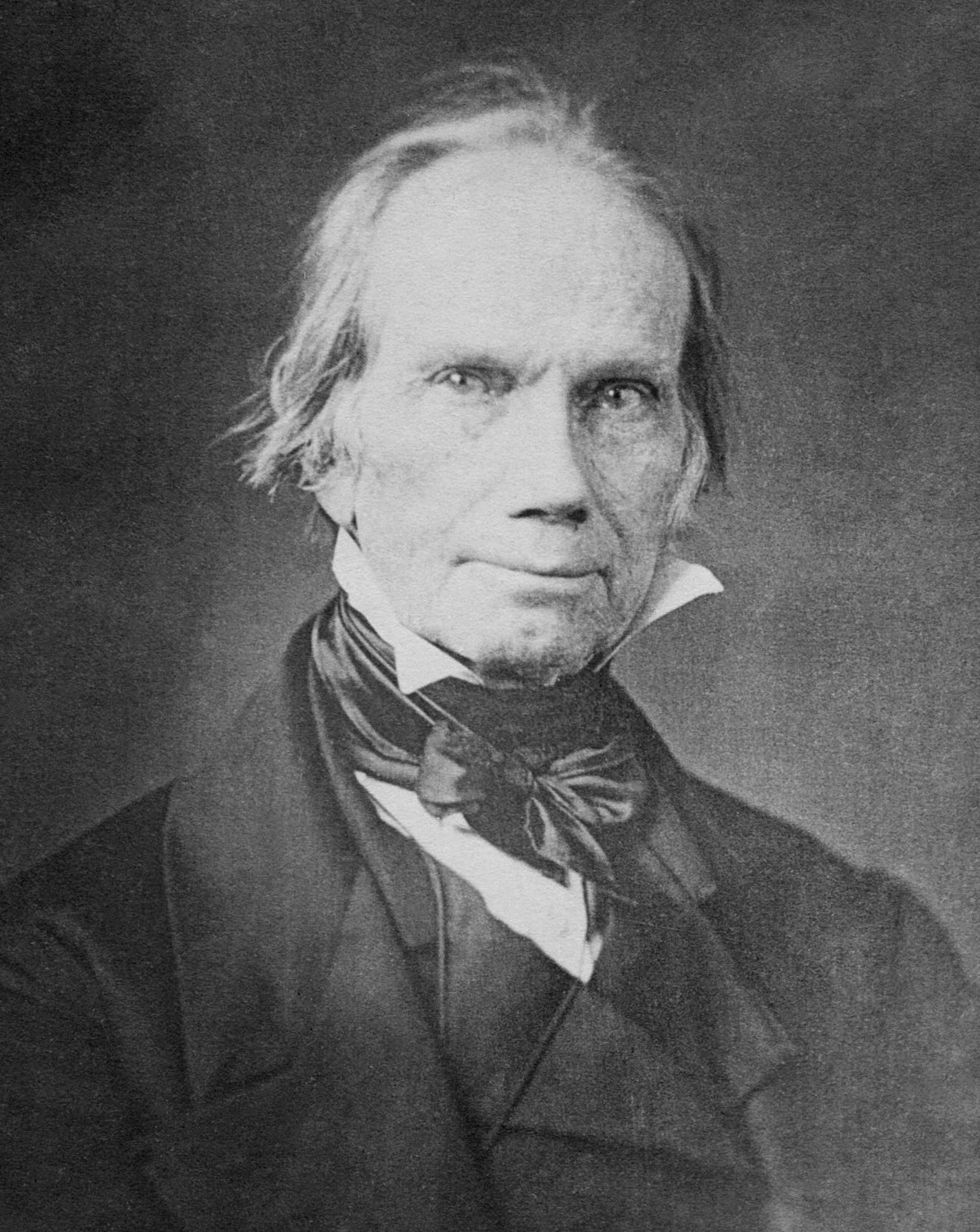
- Clay in 1848

9th United States Secretary of State
- In office March 4, 1825 – March 4, 1829
- President: John Quincy Adams
- Preceded by: John Quincy Adams
- Succeeded by: Martin Van Buren

United States Senator from Kentucky
- In office March 4, 1849 – June 29, 1852
- Preceded by: Thomas Metcalfe
- Succeeded by: David Meriwether
- In office November 10, 1831 – March 31, 1842
- Preceded by: John Rowan
- Succeeded by: John J. Crittenden
- In office January 4, 1810 – March 3, 1811
- Appointed by: Charles Scott
- Preceded by: Buckner Thruston
- Succeeded by: George M. Bibb
- In office December 29, 1806 – March 3, 1807
- Preceded by: John Adair
- Succeeded by: John Pope

7th Speaker of the United States House of Representatives
- In office December 1, 1823 – March 3, 1825
- Preceded by: Philip P. Barbour
- Succeeded by: John W. Taylor
- In office December 4, 1815 – October 28, 1820
- Preceded by: Langdon Cheves
- Succeeded by: John W. Taylor
- In office November 4, 1811 – January 19, 1814
- Preceded by: Joseph Bradley Varnum
- Succeeded by: Langdon Cheves

Member of the U.S. House of Representatives from Kentucky
- In office March 4, 1823 – March 6, 1825
- Preceded by: John Telemachus Johnson
- Succeeded by: James Clark
- Constituency: 3rd district
- In office March 4, 1815 – March 3, 1821
- Preceded by: Joseph H. Hawkins
- Succeeded by: Samuel H. Woodson
- Constituency: 2nd district
- In office March 4, 1811 – January 19, 1814
- Preceded by: William T. Barry
- Succeeded by: Joseph H. Hawkins
- Constituency: 2nd district (1813–1814); 5th district (1811–1813)

Personal details
- Born: April 12, 1777 Hanover County, Virginia
- Died: June 29, 1852 (aged 75) Washington, D.C., U.S.
- Resting place: Lexington Cemetery
- Party: Democratic-Republican (1797–1825); National Republican (1825–1833); Whig (1833–1852)
- Spouse: Lucretia Hart (m. 1799)
- Children: 11, including Thomas, Henry Jr., James, John
- Education: College of William & Mary

This is a bibliography of works about and principle works by Henry Clay.

Henry Clay (April 12, 1777 – June 29, 1852) was an American lawyer, statesman, and diplomat who represented Kentucky in both the United States House of Representatives and the United States Senate. He was the seventh House speaker as well as the ninth secretary of state. Clay unsuccessfully ran for president in the 1824, 1832, and 1844 elections. He helped found both the National Republican Party and the Whig Party. For his role in defusing sectional crises, he earned the appellation of the "Great Compromiser" and was part of the "Great Triumvirate" of Congressmen, alongside fellow Whig Daniel Webster and Democrat John C. Calhoun.

Works listed here are cited in the notes or bibliographies of scholarly sources. Each is published by an academic or major press, written by a recognized expert, or substantially reviewed in scholarly journals; borderline cases are omitted. A selection of primary sources are included. Many of the books below carry their own bibliographies; see the Further reading section for other bibliographies, and the External links section for historical sites, academic sites, and museums.

Citations follow APA style. (Note: Entries are in plain text APA 7 format without templates; templates are used only for reviews and notes.) Book have citations to academic journal or mainstream published reviews when available. For books only partly about the subject, relevant chapter or section titles are provided when useful and available. Translators of the original-language edition are included when possible. In cases where a title or name has appeared with more than one English spelling, the most recent published form is used and a footnote documents any earlier title under which the work appeared.

== General works ==
- Baxter, M. G. (2000). Henry Clay the lawyer. University Press of Kentucky.
- Eaton, C. (1957). Henry Clay and the art of American politics. Little, Brown.
- Heidler, D. S., & Heidler, J. T. (2010). Henry Clay: The essential American. Random House.
- Klotter, J. C. (2012). Kentucky, the Civil War, and the spirit of Henry Clay. Register of the Kentucky Historical Society, 110(3–4), 243–263. doi:10.1353/khs.2012.0068
- Klotter, J. C. (2018). Henry Clay: The man who would be president. Oxford University Press.
- Knupfer, P. (1992). The return of Henry Clay. Reviews in American History, 20(3), 319. JSTOR 2703152
- Mayo, B. (1937). Henry Clay: Spokesman of the New West. Houghton Mifflin.
- Peterson, M. D. (1987). The great triumvirate: Webster, Clay, and Calhoun. Oxford University Press.
- Remini, R. V. (1991). Henry Clay: Statesman for the Union. W. W. Norton.
- Unger, H. G. (2015). Henry Clay: America's greatest statesman. Da Capo Press.
- Watson, H. L. (1998). Andrew Jackson vs. Henry Clay: Democracy and development in antebellum America. Bedford/St. Martin's.

== Topical works ==
=== War of 1812 ===
- Hatzenbuehler, R. L. (1976). The war hawks and the question of congressional leadership in 1812. Pacific Historical Review, 45(1), 1–22. JSTOR 3637298
- King, Q. S. (2014). Henry Clay and the War of 1812. McFarland.
- Risjord, N. K. (1961). 1812: Conservatives, war hawks, and the nation's honor. The William and Mary Quarterly, 18(2), 196. JSTOR 1918543

=== Nullification and the Compromise of 1833 ===
- Ellis, R. E. (1987). The Union at risk: Jacksonian democracy, states' rights, and the nullification crisis. Oxford University Press.
- Peterson, M. D. (1982). Olive branch and sword: The Compromise of 1833. Louisiana State University Press.

=== Slavery and the Missouri Compromise ===
- Burin, E. (2005). Slavery and the peculiar solution: A history of the American Colonization Society. University Press of Florida.
- Earle, J. H. (2004). Jacksonian antislavery and the politics of free soil, 1824–1854. University of North Carolina Press.
- Mason, M. (2006). Slavery and politics in the early American republic. University of North Carolina Press.
- Staudenraus, P. J. (1961). The African colonization movement, 1816–1865. Columbia University Press.
- Tallant, H. D. (2003). Evil necessity: Slavery and political culture in antebellum Kentucky. University Press of Kentucky.
- Tomek, B. C. (2011). Colonization and its discontents: Emancipation, emigration, and antislavery in antebellum Pennsylvania. New York University Press.

=== Missouri Compromise ===
- Forbes, R. P. (2007). The Missouri Compromise and its aftermath: Slavery and the meaning of America. University of North Carolina Press.
- Moore, G. (1953). The Missouri controversy, 1819–1821. University of Kentucky Press.

=== The Compromise of 1850 ===
- Bearss, S. B. (1987). Henry Clay and the American claims against Portugal, 1850. Journal of the Early Republic, 7(2), 167. JSTOR 3123458
- Bordewich, F. M. (2012). America's great debate: Henry Clay, Stephen A. Douglas, and the compromise that preserved the Union. Simon & Schuster.
- Freehling, W. W. (1990). The road to disunion: Vol. 1. Secessionists at bay, 1776–1854. Oxford University Press.
- Hamilton, H. (1954). Democratic Senate leadership and the Compromise of 1850. The Mississippi Valley Historical Review, 41(3), 403. JSTOR 1897490
- Hamilton, H. (1957). "The cave of the winds" and the Compromise of 1850. The Journal of Southern History, 23(3), 331. JSTOR 2954884
- Hamilton, H. (1964). Prologue to conflict: The crisis and compromise of 1850. University of Kentucky Press.
- Jasinski, J. (1995). The forms and limits of prudence in Henry Clay's (1850) defense of the compromise measures. Quarterly Journal of Speech, 81(4), 454–478.
- Knupfer, P. B. (1991). The Union as it is: Constitutional unionism and sectional compromise, 1787–1861. University of North Carolina Press.
- Paulus, S. B. (2014). America's long eulogy for compromise: Henry Clay and American politics, 1854–58. The Journal of the Civil War Era, 4(1), 28–52.
- Potter, D. M. (1976). The impending crisis, 1848–1861 (completed and edited by D. E. Fehrenbacher). Harper & Row.
- Remini, R. V. (2010). At the edge of the precipice: Henry Clay and the compromise that saved the Union. Basic Books.
- Russel, R. R. (1956). What was the Compromise of 1850? The Journal of Southern History, 22(3), 292. JSTOR 2954547
- Stegmaier, M. J. (1996). Texas, New Mexico, and the Compromise of 1850: Boundary dispute and sectional crisis. Kent State University Press.
- Varon, E. R. (2008). Disunion! The coming of the American Civil War, 1789–1859. University of North Carolina Press.

== Miscellaneous ==
- Apple, L. (2011). The family legacy of Henry Clay: In the shadow of a Kentucky patriarch. University Press of Kentucky.
- Brooks, E. (2024). Reframing history: Evolving perspectives on representation at Ashland, the Henry Clay Estate. Register of the Kentucky Historical Society, 122(2), 205–226.
- Portteus, K. J. (2020). "My beau ideal of a statesman": Abraham Lincoln's eulogy on Henry Clay. Journal of the Abraham Lincoln Association, 41(2), 1–24.
- Runyon, R. (2018). The Mentelles: Mary Todd Lincoln, Henry Clay, and the immigrant family who educated antebellum Kentucky. University Press of Kentucky.

== Older works ==
- Schurz, C. (1887). Life of Henry Clay (Vols. 1–2). Houghton Mifflin.
- Van Deusen, G. G. (1937). The life of Henry Clay. Little, Brown.

== Primary sources ==
- Clay, H. (1959). The papers of Henry Clay: Vol. 1. The rising statesman, 1797–1814 (J. F. Hopkins, Ed.). University of Kentucky Press.
- Clay, H. (1961). The papers of Henry Clay: Vol. 2. The rising statesman, 1815–1820 (J. F. Hopkins, Ed.). University of Kentucky Press.
- Clay, H. (1963). The papers of Henry Clay: Vol. 3. Presidential candidate, 1821–1824 (J. F. Hopkins, Ed.). University of Kentucky Press.
- Clay, H. (1972). The papers of Henry Clay: Vol. 4. Secretary of State, 1825 (J. F. Hopkins & M. W. M. Hargreaves, Eds.). University Press of Kentucky.
- Clay, H. (1973). The papers of Henry Clay: Vol. 5. Secretary of State, 1826 (J. F. Hopkins & M. W. M. Hargreaves, Eds.). University Press of Kentucky.
- Clay, H. (1981). The papers of Henry Clay: Vol. 6. Secretary of State, 1827 (M. W. M. Hargreaves & J. F. Hopkins, Eds.). University Press of Kentucky.
- Clay, H. (1982). The papers of Henry Clay: Vol. 7. Secretary of State, January 1, 1828 – March 4, 1829 (R. Seager II, Ed.). University Press of Kentucky.
- Clay, H. (1984). The papers of Henry Clay: Vol. 8. Candidate, compromiser, Whig, March 5, 1829 – December 31, 1836 (R. Seager II, Ed.). University Press of Kentucky.
- Clay, H. (1988). The papers of Henry Clay: Vol. 9. The Whig leader, January 1, 1837 – December 31, 1843 (R. Seager II, Ed.). University Press of Kentucky.
- Clay, H. (1991). The papers of Henry Clay: Vol. 10. Candidate, compromiser, elder statesman, January 1, 1844 – June 29, 1852 (M. P. Hay, Ed.). University Press of Kentucky.
- Clay, H. (1992). The papers of Henry Clay: Supplement, 1793–1852 (M. P. Hay, Ed.). University Press of Kentucky.

=== Major speeches and writings ===
- Clay, H. (1813). Speech delivered by the Hon. Henry Clay, in the House of Representatives
- Clay, H. (1825). To the people of the congressional district composed of the counties of Fayette, Woodford, and Clarke
- Clay, H. (1827a). An address of Henry Clay to the public
- Clay, H. (1827b). Mr. Clay's speech on the tariff
- Clay, H. (1827c). Speech of the Hon. Henry Clay, before the American Colonization Society
- Clay, H. (1827d). The speeches of Henry Clay, delivered in the Congress of the United States
- Clay, H. (1828). A supplement to the address of Henry Clay to the public
- Clay, H. (1832). Speech of Henry Clay, in defence of the American system
- Clay, H. (1834). Speech of the Hon. Henry Clay, on the subject of the removal of the deposites
- Clay, H. (1839). Speech of Mr. Clay, of Kentucky, on the subject of abolition petitions
- Clay, H. (1840). Speech of H. Clay, of Kentucky, on the bill commonly called the Sub-treasury Bill
- Clay, H. (1843). The life and speeches of the Hon. Henry Clay
- Clay, H. (1844). Letters of Messrs. Clay, Benton, and Barrow on the subject of the annexation of Texas
- Clay, H. (1847). Speech of Henry Clay, at the Lexington mass meeting, 13th November, 1847, together with the resolutions adopted on that occasion
- Clay, H. (1850a). Mr. Clay's speech to the General Assembly of Kentucky. A. G. Hodges.
- Clay, H. (1850b). Speech of Henry Clay, of Kentucky, on the report of the Committee of Thirteen
- Clay, H. (1850c). Speech of Mr. Clay, of Kentucky, in support of his propositions to compromise
- Clay, H. (1850d). Speech of the Hon. Henry Clay, of Kentucky, on taking up his compromise resolutions on the subject of slavery
- Clay, H. (1855). The private correspondence of Henry Clay (C. Colton, Ed.)
- Clay, H. (1904). The works of Henry Clay, comprising his life, correspondence and speeches (C. Colton, Ed.; Vols. 1–10)
- Library of Congress. (n.d.). A century of lawmaking for a new nation: U.S. congressional documents and debates 1774–1875
- "Henry Clay (Clay, Henry, 1777-1852)". The Online Books Page.
- U.S. Senate. (n.d.). Classic Senate speeches: Henry Clay, In defense of the American system, February 2, 3, and 6, 1832
