= Josephine Russell Clay =

American thoroughbred horse breeder and writer

Josephine Russell Erwin Clay (December 7, 1835 – March 29, 1920) was one of the first significant woman thoroughbred horse breeders in America and a writer. She was also known as Josephine Deborah Russell, Mrs. Eugene Erwin, Josephine Erwin, Mrs. John M. Clay, and Josephine Clay.

== Life as Mrs. Erwin ==
Born in Fulton, Missouri, she was a daughter of William Henry Russell. In 1853 Josephine Deborah Russell married a grandson of Henry Clay named Andrew Eugene Erwin.

Prior to the Civil War, the couple had three daughters. During the war, Erwin served in the Confederate Army, rising to the rank of Colonel and commanding of the 6th Missouri Infantry Regiment. In 1863 Josephine Erwin brought the couple's nine-year-old daughter, Lucretia (Lula), to join Andrew Erwin who was part of the force defending Vicksburg. Andrew Erwin was killed in the Battle of Vicksburg, one week before the end of the Union siege. On July 18, 1863, the pregnant Josephine Erwin met with General Ulysses S. Grant to obtain passes allowing Lula and her to return to Missouri. Josephine Erwin bore her fourth daughter in 1864, but the girl died shortly after her birth.

== Racing and breeding thoroughbreds ==
The Clay family invited her and her three surviving daughters to move to Lexington, Kentucky and supervise the household of John Morrison Clay, Henry Clay's youngest son, a bachelor. John had inherited a portion of his father's estate, Ashland. To distinguish John's lands from Ashland proper, which went to his brother James Brown Clay, John's farm was variously called Ashland-on-the-Tates-Creek-Pike, Ashland Stock Farm, and Ashland Stud.

Josephine and John were married in 1866. They had no children, but poured their time and energy into training and racing horses for about twenty years. John Clay traveled the racing circuit throughout the East, South, and Midwest. Josephine ran Ashland Stud. Their famous race horses included Skedaddle, Survivor, Star Davis, Sauce Box, Squeeze 'em, and Victory. In 1873, Victory was bought by General George Armstrong Custer, who called him Vic and rode him at the Battle of Little Big Horn in 1876. It is believed Vic died in the battle.

== Focus on breeding ==
Following her husband's death in 1887, Josephine Clay focused on breeding and selling yearlings. She inherited from John Clay twelve brood mares, all descendants of Henry Clay's brood mares Magnolia and Margaret Wood. Through 1900, Josephine Clay built her stock to more than fifty brood mares and two stallions and gained recognition as the first woman to own and operate a successful thoroughbred horse farm. She gained national recognition when Riley, a horse she had bred, won the 1890 Kentucky Derby.

In 1903, Josephine Clay dispersed her stock due to her failing eyesight and new laws in New York and other states prohibiting betting on horses.

She died at her home and is interred at Lexington Cemetery.

== Writings ==
Josephine Clay was the author of several novels and short stories, including:

- John Logan
- Some Little of the Angel Still Left
- Uncle Phil
- The Sport of Kings
