= John Morrison Clay =

American racehorse breeder (1821–1887)

John Morrison Clay (also called John M. Clay; February 21, 1821 – August 10, 1887) was a Kentucky thoroughbred breeder, a son of statesman Henry Clay, and a husband of Josephine Russell Clay and the brother of Henry Clay, Jr. and James Brown Clay.

Upon his father's death, Clay inherited a portion of the large estate, Ashland. To distinguish John Clay's land from the mansion and lands that went to his brother, James Brown Clay, John's holdings were called Ashland Stock Farm, Ashland Stud, or, sometimes, Ashland-on-the-Tates-Creek-Pike.

In 1866 John M. Clay married his nephew's widow, who became known as Josephine Russell Clay. The couple had no children, but they poured their time and energy into training and racing horses for about twenty years. John Clay traveled the racing circuit throughout the East, South, and Midwest. Josephine ran Ashland Stud. Their famous race horses included Skedaddle, Survivor, Star Davis, Sauce Box, Squeeze 'em, and Victory. Victory (Vic), in 1873, was bought by General George Armstrong Custer who rode him at the Battle of Little Big Horn in 1876. It is believed that Vic died in the battle.

Clay died in 1887, following an illness. He is interred at Lexington Cemetery. Josephine Clay continued to run Ashland Stud until her own death in 1920.

== See also ==
- Clay family

== Sources and external links ==
- Ashland
- Squib on Josephine Clay
- Horse Park Biography
- The Josephine Clay Papers at the University of Kentucky
- Discussion about Vic
