= Thomas Hart Clay =

American diplomat (1803–1871)

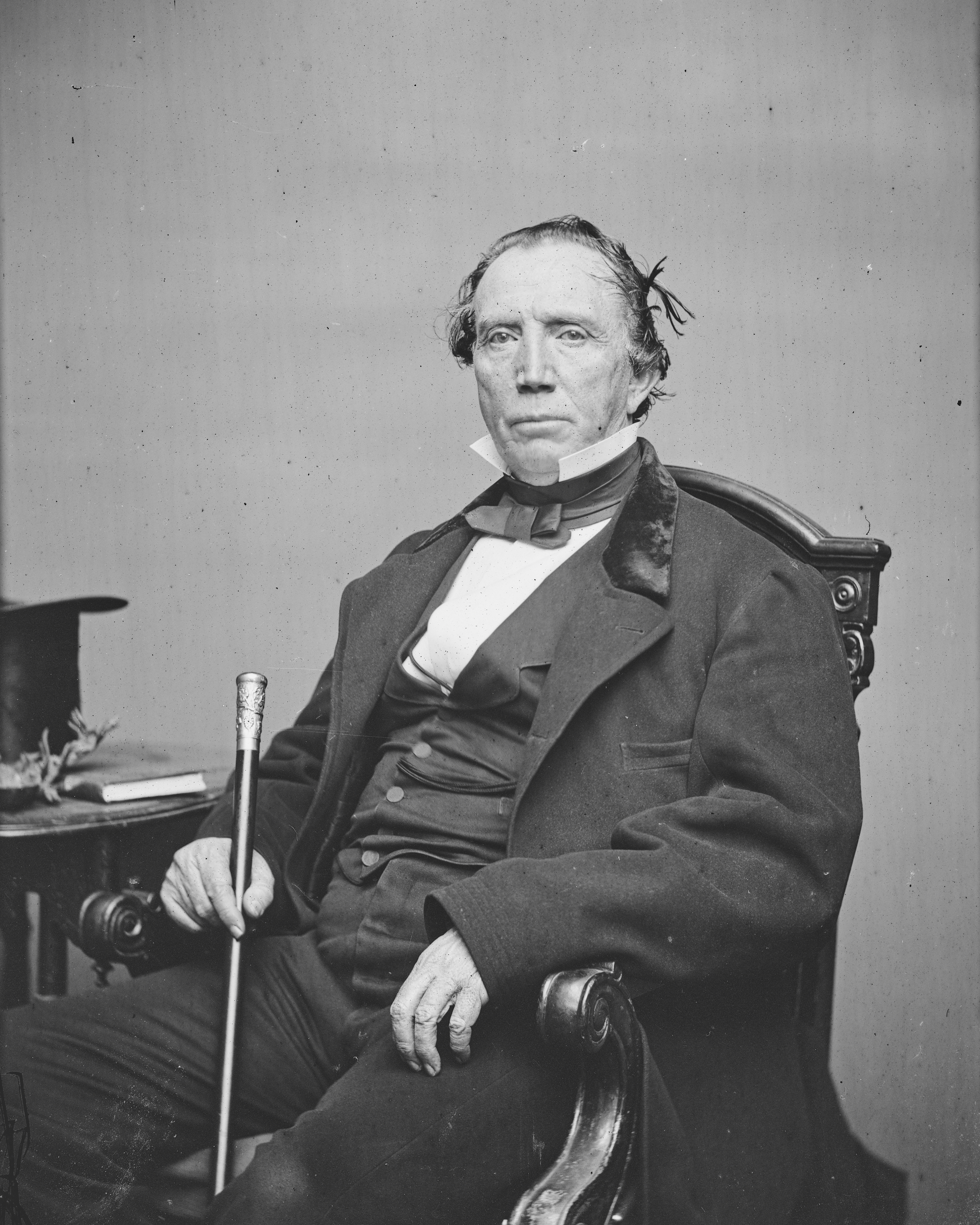
- Portrait by Mathew Brady, c. 1865

United States Minister to Honduras
- In office April 5, 1864 – August 10, 1866
- President: Abraham Lincoln; Andrew Johnson
- Preceded by: James R. Partridge
- Succeeded by: Richard H. Rousseau

United States Minister to Nicaragua
- In office January 15, 1863 – May 31, 1863
- President: Abraham Lincoln
- Preceded by: Andrew B. Dickinson
- Succeeded by: Andrew B. Dickinson

Member of the Kentucky House of Representatives from Fayette County
- In office 1859–1861

Personal details
- Born: September 22, 1803 Lexington, Kentucky, U.S.
- Died: March 18, 1871 (aged 67) Lexington, Kentucky, U.S.
- Resting place: Lexington Cemetery
- Party: Whig (until 1856); Know Nothing (1856–1858); Opposition (1858–1860); Constitutional Union (1860)
- Spouse: Mary Russell Mentelle (m. 1837)
- Parent: Henry Clay (father)
- Education: Transylvania University
- Occupation: Farmer; lawyer; diplomat; politician

Thomas Hart Clay (September 22, 1803 – March 18, 1871) was the U.S. ambassador to Honduras and Nicaragua. He was a son of Henry Clay.
