= Henry Clay =

American politician (1777–1852)

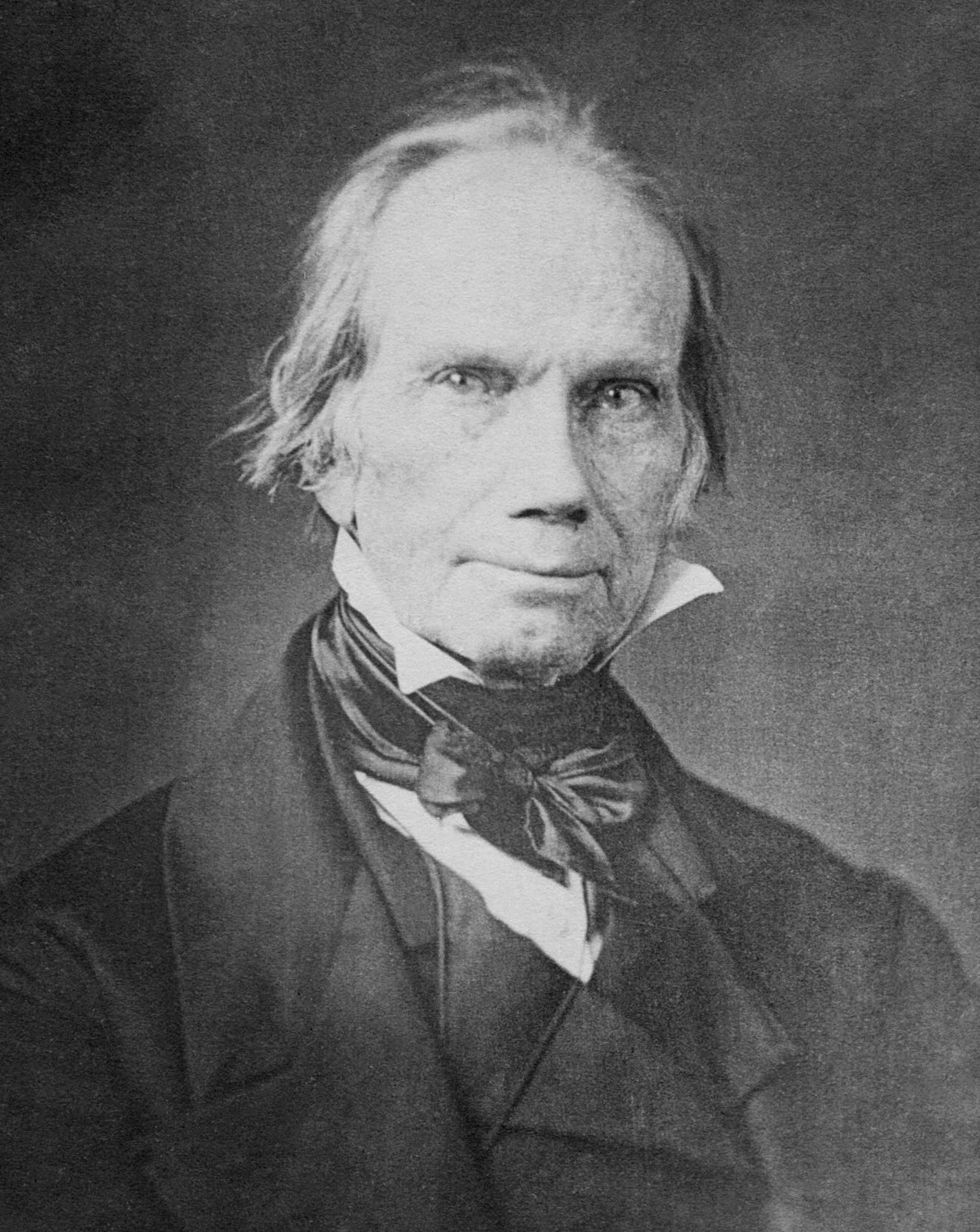
- Clay in 1848

9th United States Secretary of State
- In office March 4, 1825 – March 4, 1829
- President: John Quincy Adams
- Preceded by: John Quincy Adams
- Succeeded by: Martin Van Buren

United States Senator from Kentucky
- In office March 4, 1849 – June 29, 1852
- Preceded by: Thomas Metcalfe
- Succeeded by: David Meriwether
- In office November 10, 1831 – March 31, 1842
- Preceded by: John Rowan
- Succeeded by: John J. Crittenden
- In office January 4, 1810 – March 3, 1811
- Appointed by: Charles Scott
- Preceded by: Buckner Thruston
- Succeeded by: George M. Bibb
- In office December 29, 1806 – March 3, 1807
- Preceded by: John Adair
- Succeeded by: John Pope

7th Speaker of the United States House of Representatives
- In office December 1, 1823 – March 3, 1825
- Preceded by: Philip P. Barbour
- Succeeded by: John W. Taylor
- In office December 4, 1815 – October 28, 1820
- Preceded by: Langdon Cheves
- Succeeded by: John W. Taylor
- In office November 4, 1811 – January 19, 1814
- Preceded by: Joseph Bradley Varnum
- Succeeded by: Langdon Cheves

Member of the U.S. House of Representatives from Kentucky
- In office March 4, 1823 – March 6, 1825
- Preceded by: John Telemachus Johnson
- Succeeded by: James Clark
- Constituency: 3rd district
- In office March 4, 1815 – March 3, 1821
- Preceded by: Joseph H. Hawkins
- Succeeded by: Samuel H. Woodson
- Constituency: 2nd district
- In office March 4, 1811 – January 19, 1814
- Preceded by: William T. Barry
- Succeeded by: Joseph H. Hawkins
- Constituency: 2nd district (1813–1814); 5th district (1811–1813)

Personal details
- Born: April 12, 1777 Hanover County, Virginia
- Died: June 29, 1852 (aged 75) Washington, D.C., U.S.
- Resting place: Lexington Cemetery
- Party: Democratic-Republican (1797–1825); National Republican (1825–1833); Whig (1833–1852)
- Spouse: Lucretia Hart (m. 1799)
- Children: 11, including Thomas, Henry Jr., James, John
- Education: College of William & Mary

Henry Clay (April 12, 1777 – June 29, 1852) was an American lawyer, statesman, and diplomat who represented Kentucky in both the United States House of Representatives and the United States Senate. He was the seventh House speaker as well as the ninth secretary of state. Clay unsuccessfully ran for president in the 1824, 1832, and 1844 elections. He helped found both the National Republican Party and the Whig Party. For his role in defusing sectional crises, he earned the appellation of the "Great Compromiser" and was part of the "Great Triumvirate" of Congressmen, alongside fellow Whig Daniel Webster and Democrat John C. Calhoun.

Clay was born in Hanover County, Virginia, in 1777, and began his legal career in Lexington, Kentucky, in 1797. As a member of the Democratic-Republican Party, he won election to the Kentucky state legislature in 1803 and to the U.S. House of Representatives in 1810. Clay was chosen as Speaker of the House in early 1811 and, along with President James Madison, led the United States into the War of 1812 against Great Britain. In 1814, he helped negotiate the Treaty of Ghent, which brought an end to the War of 1812, and then after the war, Clay returned to his position as Speaker of the House and developed the American System, which called for federal infrastructure investments, support for the national bank, and high protective tariff rates. During 1820, Clay helped bring an end to a sectional crisis over slavery for many years by leading the passage of the Missouri Compromise. He finished with the fourth-most electoral votes in the multi-candidate 1824–1825 presidential election and used his position as speaker to help John Quincy Adams win the contingent election held to select the president. President Adams then appointed him to the position of Secretary of State. As a result, critics alleged that the two had agreed to a "corrupt bargain".

Adams was defeated by Democrat Andrew Jackson in the bitter 1828 presidential election. Clay won election to the U.S. Senate in 1831 and ran as the National Republican nominee in the 1832 presidential election. Clay was defeated decisively by President Jackson primarily due to his support for the national bank, which Jackson vehemently opposed. After the 1832 election, Clay helped bring an end to the nullification crisis by leading passage of the Tariff of 1833. During Jackson's second term, opponents of the president including Clay, Webster, and William Henry Harrison created the Whig Party, and Clay became a leading congressional Whig.

Clay sought the presidency in the 1840 election but was passed over at the Whig National Convention in favor of Harrison. When Harrison died and his vice president John Tyler ascended to office in 1841, Clay clashed with Tyler, who broke with Clay and other congressional Whigs. Clay resigned from the Senate in 1842 and won the 1844 Whig presidential nomination, but he was narrowly defeated in the general election by Democrat James K. Polk, who made the annexation of the Republic of Texas his top issue. Clay strongly criticized the subsequent Mexican–American War, where his son Henry Clay Jr. was killed at the Battle of Buena Vista, and sought the Whig presidential nomination in 1848 but was passed over in favor of General Zachary Taylor who went on to win the election. After returning to the Senate in 1849, Clay played a key role in passing the Compromise of 1850, which postponed a crisis over the status of slavery in the territories.

== Early life ==
Henry Clay was born on April 12, 1777, at the Clay homestead in Hanover County, Virginia. He was the seventh of nine children born to the Reverend John Clay and Elizabeth (née Hudson) Clay. Almost all of Henry's older siblings died before adulthood. His father, a Baptist minister nicknamed "Sir John", died in 1781, leaving Henry and his brothers two enslaved individuals each; he also left his wife 18 slaves and 464 acres (188 ha) of land. Clay was of entirely English descent; his ancestor, John Clay, settled in Virginia in 1613. The Clay family became a well-known political family including three other US senators, numerous state politicians, and Clay's cousin Cassius Clay, a prominent anti-slavery activist active in the mid-19th century.

The British raided Clay's home shortly after the death of his father, leaving the family in a precarious economic position. However, the widow Elizabeth Clay married Captain Henry Watkins, a successful planter and cousin to John Clay. Elizabeth would have seven more children with Watkins, bearing a total of sixteen children. Watkins became a kind and supportive stepfather and Clay had a very good relationship with him. After his mother's remarriage, the young Clay remained in Hanover County, where he learned how to read and write. In 1791, Watkins moved the family to Kentucky, joining his brother in the pursuit of fertile new lands in the West. However, Clay did not follow, as Watkins secured his temporary employment in a Richmond emporium, with the promise that Clay would receive the next available clerkship at the Virginia Court of Chancery.

After Clay had worked at the Richmond emporium for a year, he obtained a clerkship that had become available at the Virginia Court of Chancery. Clay adapted well to his new role, and his handwriting earned him the attention of College of William & Mary professor George Wythe, a signer of the Declaration of Independence, mentor of Thomas Jefferson, and judge on Virginia's High Court of Chancery. Hampered by a crippled hand, Wythe chose Clay as his secretary and amanuensis, a role in which Clay would remain for four years. Clay began to read law under Wythe's mentorship. Wythe had a powerful effect on Clay's worldview, with Clay embracing Wythe's belief that the example of the United States could help spread human freedom around the world. Wythe subsequently arranged a position for Clay with Virginia attorney general Robert Brooke, with the understanding that Brooke would finish Clay's legal studies. After completing his studies under Brooke, Clay was admitted to the Virginia Bar in 1797.

== Marriage and family ==
On April 11, 1799, Clay married Lucretia Hart (1781–1864) at the Hart home in Lexington, Kentucky. Her father, Colonel Thomas Hart, was an early settler of Kentucky and a prominent businessman. Hart proved to be an important business connection for Clay, as he helped Clay gain new clients and grow in professional stature. Hart was the namesake and grand-uncle of Missouri Senator Thomas Hart Benton and was also related to James Brown, a prominent Louisiana politician, and Isaac Shelby, the first governor of Kentucky. Henry Clay was an active Freemason, and served as worshipful master of Lexington lodge No.1 in 1801. Henry and Lucretia would remain married until his death in 1852; she lived until 1864, dying at the age of 83. Both are buried at Lexington Cemetery.

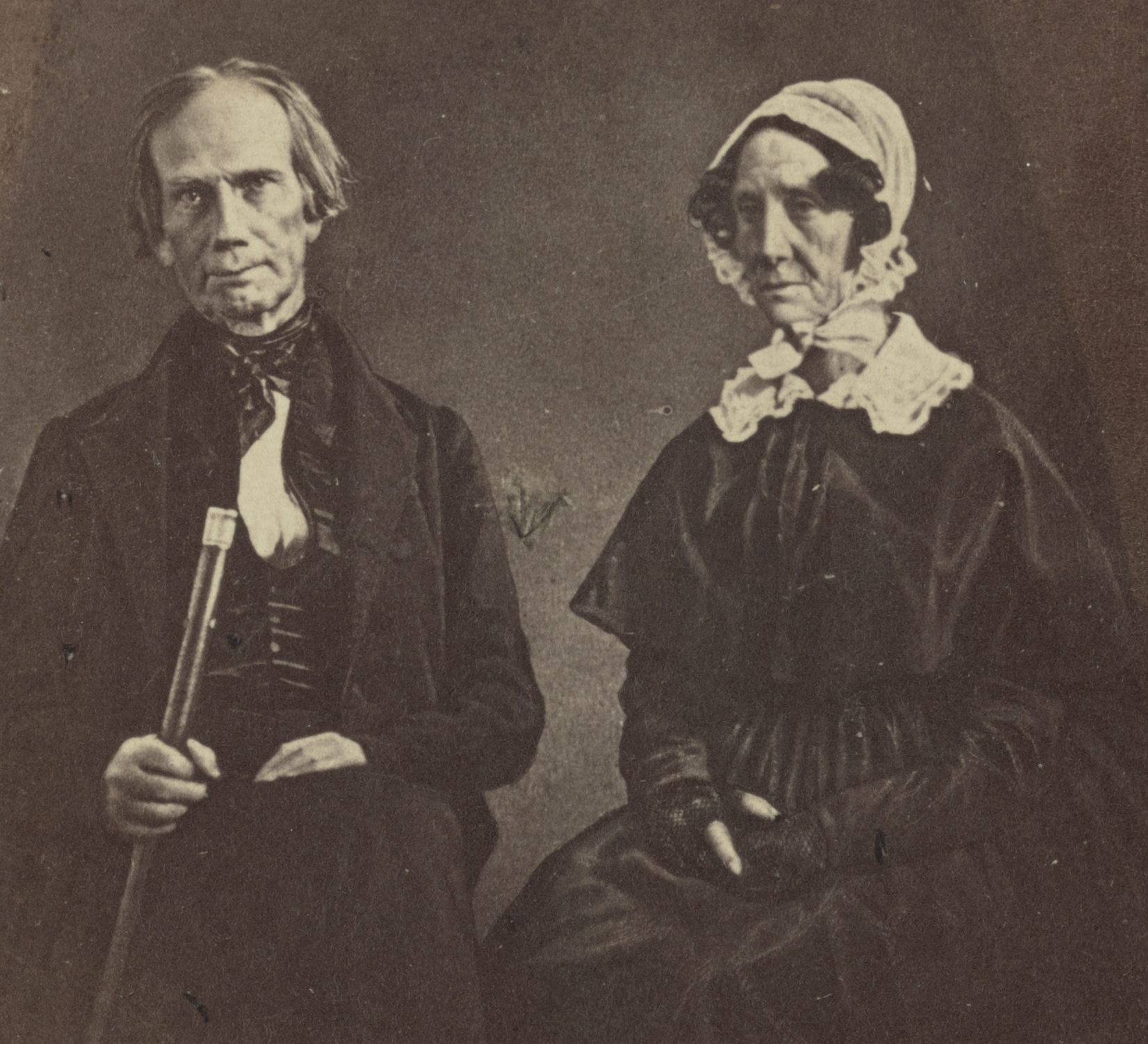
Henry Clay and Lucretia (née Hart)

Clay and Lucretia had eleven children (six daughters and five sons): Henrietta (born in 1800), Theodore (1802), Thomas (1803), Susan (1805), Anne (1807), Lucretia (1809), Henry Jr. (1811), Eliza (1813), Laura (1815), James (1817), and John (1821). By 1835, all six daughters had died of varying causes, two when very young, two as children, and the last two as young mothers. Henry Jr. was killed while commanding a regiment at the Battle of Buena Vista during the Mexican–American War. Clay's oldest son, Theodore Wythe Clay, spent the second half of his life confined to a psychiatric hospital. When a young child, Theodore was injured by a blow to his head that fractured his skull. As he grew older his condition devolved into insanity, and from 1831 until his death in 1870 he was confined to an asylum in Lexington. Thomas (who had served some jail time in Philadelphia in 1829–1830) became a successful farmer, James established a legal practice (and later served in Congress), and John (who in his mid-20s was also confined to the asylum for a short time) became a successful horse breeder.

Clay was greatly interested in gambling, although he favored numerous restrictions and legal limitations on it. Famously, he once won $40,000 (approximately $970,000 as of 2020). Clay asked for $500 (approximately $12,000 today) and waived the remainder of the debt. Shortly afterward, Clay fell into a debt of $60,000 (approximately $1.5 million today) while gambling with the same man, who then asked for the $500 back and waived the rest of the debt.

External videos
- Guided tour of Ashland, The Henry Clay Estate, June 22, 2015, C-SPAN

They initially lived in Lexington, but in 1804 they began building a plantation outside of Lexington known as Ashland. The Ashland estate eventually encompassed over 500 acres (200 ha), with numerous outbuildings such as a smokehouse, a greenhouse, and several barns. There were 122 enslaved people at the estate during Clay's lifetime, with about 50 people needed for farming and the household. He planted crops such as corn, wheat, and rye, as well as hemp, the chief crop of the Bluegrass region. Clay also took a strong interest in thoroughbred racing and imported livestock such as Arabian horses, Maltese donkeys, and Hereford cattle. Though Clay suffered some financial issues during economic downturns, he never fell deeply into debt and ultimately left his children a large inheritance. After the deaths of Anne and Susan, Clay and Lucretia raised several grandchildren at Ashland.

== Early career in law and politics ==
=== Legal career ===
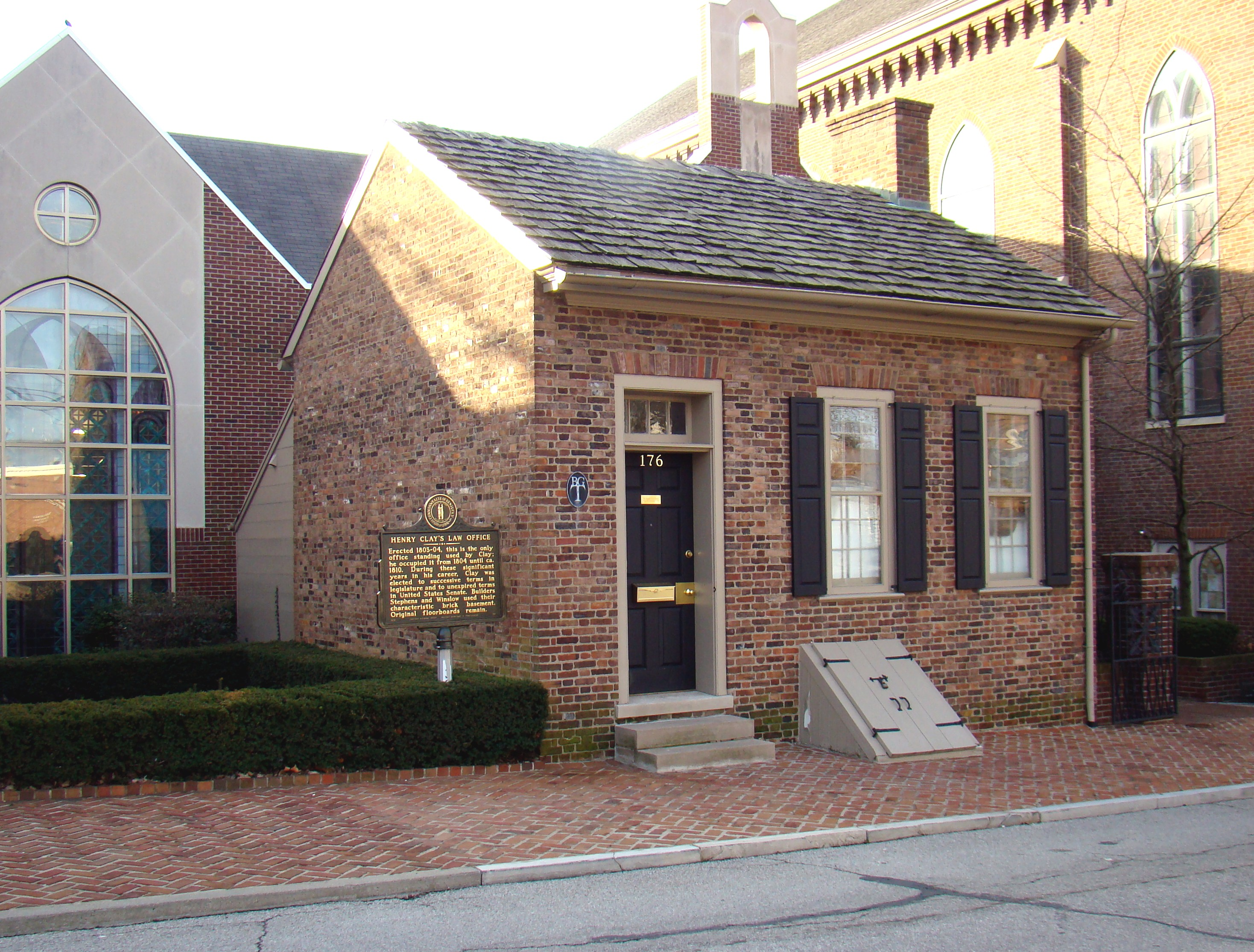
View of Henry Clay's law office (1803–1810), Lexington, Kentucky

In November 1797, Clay relocated to Lexington, Kentucky, near where his parents and siblings resided. The Bluegrass region, with Lexington at its center, had quickly grown in the preceding decades but had only recently stopped being under the threat of Native American raids. Lexington was an established town that hosted Transylvania University, the first university west of the Appalachian Mountains. Having already passed the Virginia Bar, Clay quickly received a Kentucky license to practice law. After apprenticing himself to Kentucky attorneys such as George Nicholas, John Breckenridge, and James Brown, Clay established his own law practice, frequently working on debt collections and land disputes. Clay soon established a reputation for strong legal ability and courtroom oratory. In 1805, he was appointed to the faculty of Transylvania University where he taught, among others, future Kentucky Governor Robert P. Letcher and Robert Todd, the future father-in-law of Abraham Lincoln.

Clay's client Aaron Burr was indicted for treason in the Burr conspiracy. Clay and his law partner John Allen successfully defended Burr without charging a fee in 1807. Thomas Jefferson later convinced Clay that Burr had been guilty of the charges. Clay's legal practice was light after his election to Congress. In the 1823 case Green v. Biddle, Clay submitted the Supreme Court's first amicus curiae. However, he lost that case.

=== Early political career ===
Clay entered politics shortly after arriving in Kentucky. In his first political speech, he attacked the Alien and Sedition Acts, laws passed by Federalists to suppress dissent during the Quasi-War with France. Like most Kentuckians, Clay was a member of the Democratic-Republican Party, but he clashed with state party leaders over a state constitutional convention. Using the pseudonym "Scaevola" (in reference to Gaius Mucius Scaevola), Clay advocated for direct elections for Kentucky elected officials and the gradual emancipation of slavery in Kentucky. The 1799 Kentucky Constitution included the direct election of public officials, but the state did not adopt Clay's plan for gradual emancipation.

In 1803, Clay won election to the Kentucky House of Representatives. His first legislative initiative was the partisan gerrymander of Kentucky's Electoral College districts, which ensured that all of Kentucky's presidential electors voted for President Jefferson in the 1804 presidential election. Clay clashed with legislators who sought to reduce the power of Clay's Bluegrass region, and he unsuccessfully advocated moving the state capitol from Frankfort to Lexington. Clay frequently opposed populist firebrand Felix Grundy, and he helped defeat Grundy's effort to revoke the banking privileges of the state-owned Kentucky Insurance Company. He advocated for the construction of internal improvements, which would become a consistent theme throughout his public career. Clay's influence in Kentucky state politics was such that in 1806 the Kentucky legislature elected him to the United States Senate. (Note: When elected by the legislature, Clay was below the constitutionally required age of thirty. It is unclear whether the state legislature or Clay himself knew that he did not meet the Senate's age requirement at the time, though he did know of the issue later in his career. Such an age qualification issue has occurred with only three other U.S. senators: Armistead Thomson Mason, John Jordan Crittenden, and John Eaton.) During his two-month tenure in the Senate, Clay advocated for the construction of various bridges and canals, including a canal connecting the Chesapeake Bay and the Delaware River.

After Clay returned to Kentucky in 1807, he was elected as the speaker of the state house of representatives. That same year, in response to attacks on American shipping by Britain and France during the Napoleonic Wars, President Jefferson arranged passage of the Embargo Act of 1807. In support of Jefferson's policy, which limited trade with foreign powers, Clay introduced a resolution to require legislators to wear homespun suits rather than those made of imported British broadcloth. The vast majority of members of the state house voted for the measure, but Humphrey Marshall, an "aristocratic lawyer who possessed a sarcastic tongue," voted against it. In early 1809, Clay challenged Marshall to a duel, which took place on January 19. While many contemporary duels were called off or fought without the intention of killing one another, both Clay and Marshall fought the duel with the intent of killing their opponent. They each had three turns to shoot; both were hit by bullets, but both survived. Clay quickly recovered from his injury and received only a minor censure from the Kentucky legislature.

In 1810, U.S. Senator Buckner Thruston resigned to accept appointment to a position as a federal judge, and Clay was selected by the legislature to fill Thruston's seat. Clay quickly emerged as a fierce critic of British attacks on American shipping, becoming part of an informal group of "war hawks" who favored expansionist policies. He also advocated the annexation of West Florida, which was controlled by Spain. On the insistence of the Kentucky legislature, Clay helped prevent the re-charter of the First Bank of the United States, arguing that it interfered with state banks and infringed on states' rights. After serving in the Senate for one year, Clay decided that he disliked the rules of the Senate and instead sought election to the United States House of Representatives. He won election unopposed in late 1810.

== Speaker of the House ==
=== Election and leadership ===
The 1810–1811 elections produced many young, anti-British members of Congress who, like Clay, supported going to war with Great Britain. Buoyed by the support of fellow war hawks, Clay was elected Speaker of the House for the 12th Congress. At 34, he was the youngest person to become speaker, a distinction he held until 1839, when 30-year-old Robert M. T. Hunter took office. He was also the first of only two new members elected speaker to date, (Note: The speaker during the 1st Congress, Frederick Muhlenberg, was technically also a new member.) the other being William Pennington in 1860.

Between 1810 and 1824, Clay was elected to seven terms in the House. His tenure was interrupted from 1814 to 1815 when he was a commissioner to peace talks with the British in Ghent, United Netherlands to end the War of 1812, and from 1821 to 1823, when he left Congress to rebuild his family's fortune in the aftermath of the Panic of 1819. Elected speaker six times, Clay's cumulative tenure in office of 10 years, 196 days, is the second-longest, surpassed only by Sam Rayburn.

As speaker, Clay wielded considerable power in making committee appointments, and like many of his predecessors he assigned his allies to important committees. Clay was exceptional in his ability to control the legislative agenda through well-placed allies and the establishment of new committees and departed from precedent by frequently taking part in floor debates. Yet he also gained a reputation for personal courteousness and fairness in his rulings and committee appointments. Clay's drive to increase the power of the office of speaker was aided by President James Madison, who deferred to Congress in most matters. John Randolph, a member of the Democratic-Republican Party but also a member of the "tertium quids" group that opposed many federal initiatives, emerged as a prominent opponent of Speaker Clay. While Randolph frequently attempted to obstruct Clay's initiatives, Clay became a master of parliamentary maneuvers that enabled him to advance his agenda even over the attempted obstruction by Randolph and others. (Note: The Clay–Randolph rivalry eventually escalated into a duel in 1826, the second of two duels fought by Clay, and ended with both parties unhurt.)

=== Madison administration, 1811–1817 ===
Clay and others he sided with demanded that the British revoke the Orders in Council, a series of decrees that had resulted in a de facto commercial war with the United States. Though Clay recognized the dangers inherent in fighting Britain, one of the most powerful countries in the world, he saw it as the only realistic alternative to a humiliating submission to British attacks on American shipping. Clay led a successful effort in the House to declare war against Britain, complying with a request from President Madison. Madison signed the declaration of war on June 18, 1812, beginning the War of 1812. During the war, Clay frequently communicated with Secretary of State James Monroe and Secretary of War William Eustis, though he advocated for the replacement of the latter. The war started poorly for the Americans, and Clay lost friends and relatives in the fighting. In October 1813, the British asked Madison to begin negotiations in Europe, and Madison asked Clay to join his diplomatic team, as the president hoped that the presence of the leading war hawk would ensure support for a peace treaty. Clay was reluctant to leave Congress but felt duty-bound to accept the offer, and so he resigned from Congress on January 19, 1814.

Clay left the country on February 25, but negotiations with the British did not begin until August 1814. Clay was part of a team of five commissioners that included Treasury Secretary Albert Gallatin, Senator James Bayard, ambassador Jonathan Russell, and ambassador John Quincy Adams, the head of the American team. Clay and Adams maintained an uneasy relationship marked by frequent clashes, and Gallatin emerged as the unofficial leader of the American team. When the British finally presented their initial peace offer, Clay was outraged by its terms, especially the British proposal for an Indian barrier state on the Great Lakes. After a series of American military successes in 1814, the British delegation made several concessions and offered a better peace deal. While Adams and Gallatin were eager to make peace as quickly as possible even if that required sub-optimal terms in the peace treaty, Clay believed that the British, worn down by years of fighting against France, greatly desired peace with the United States. Partly due to Clay's hard-line stance, the Treaty of Ghent included relatively favorable terms for the United States, essentially re-establishing the status quo ante bellum between Britain and the U.S. The treaty was signed on December 24, 1814, bringing a close to the War of 1812. After the signing of the treaty, Clay briefly traveled to London, where he helped Gallatin negotiate a commercial agreement with Britain.

Clay returned to the United States in September 1815; despite his absence, he had been elected to another term in the House of Representatives. Upon his return to Congress, Clay won election as Speaker of the House. The War of 1812 strengthened Clay's support for interventionist economic policies such as federally funded internal improvements, which he believed were necessary to improve the country's infrastructure system. He eagerly embraced President Madison's ambitious domestic package, which included infrastructure investment, tariffs to protect domestic manufacturing, and spending increases for the army and navy. With the help of John C. Calhoun and William Lowndes, Clay passed the Tariff of 1816, which served the dual purpose of raising revenue and protecting American manufacturing. To stabilize the currency, Clay and Treasury Secretary Alexander Dallas arranged passage of a bill establishing the Second Bank of the United States (also known as the national bank). Clay also supported the Bonus Bill of 1817, which would have provided a fund for internal improvements, but Madison vetoed the bill on constitutional concerns. Beginning in 1818, Clay advocated for an economic plan known as the "American System", which encompassed many of the economic measures, including protective tariffs and infrastructure investments, that he helped pass in the aftermath of the War of 1812.

=== Monroe administration, 1817–1825 ===
Like Jefferson and George Washington, President Madison decided to retire after two terms, leaving open the Democratic-Republican nomination for the 1816 presidential election. At the time, the Democratic-Republicans used a congressional nominating caucus to choose their presidential nominees, giving congressmen a powerful role in the presidential selection process. Monroe and Secretary of War William Crawford emerged as the two main candidates for the Democratic-Republican nomination. Clay had a favorable opinion of both individuals, but he supported Monroe, who won the nomination and went on to defeat Federalist candidate Rufus King in the general election. Monroe offered Clay the position of secretary of war, but Clay strongly desired the office of secretary of state and was angered when Monroe instead chose John Quincy Adams for that position. Clay became so bitter that he refused to allow Monroe's inauguration to take place in the House Chamber and subsequently did not attend Monroe's outdoor inauguration.

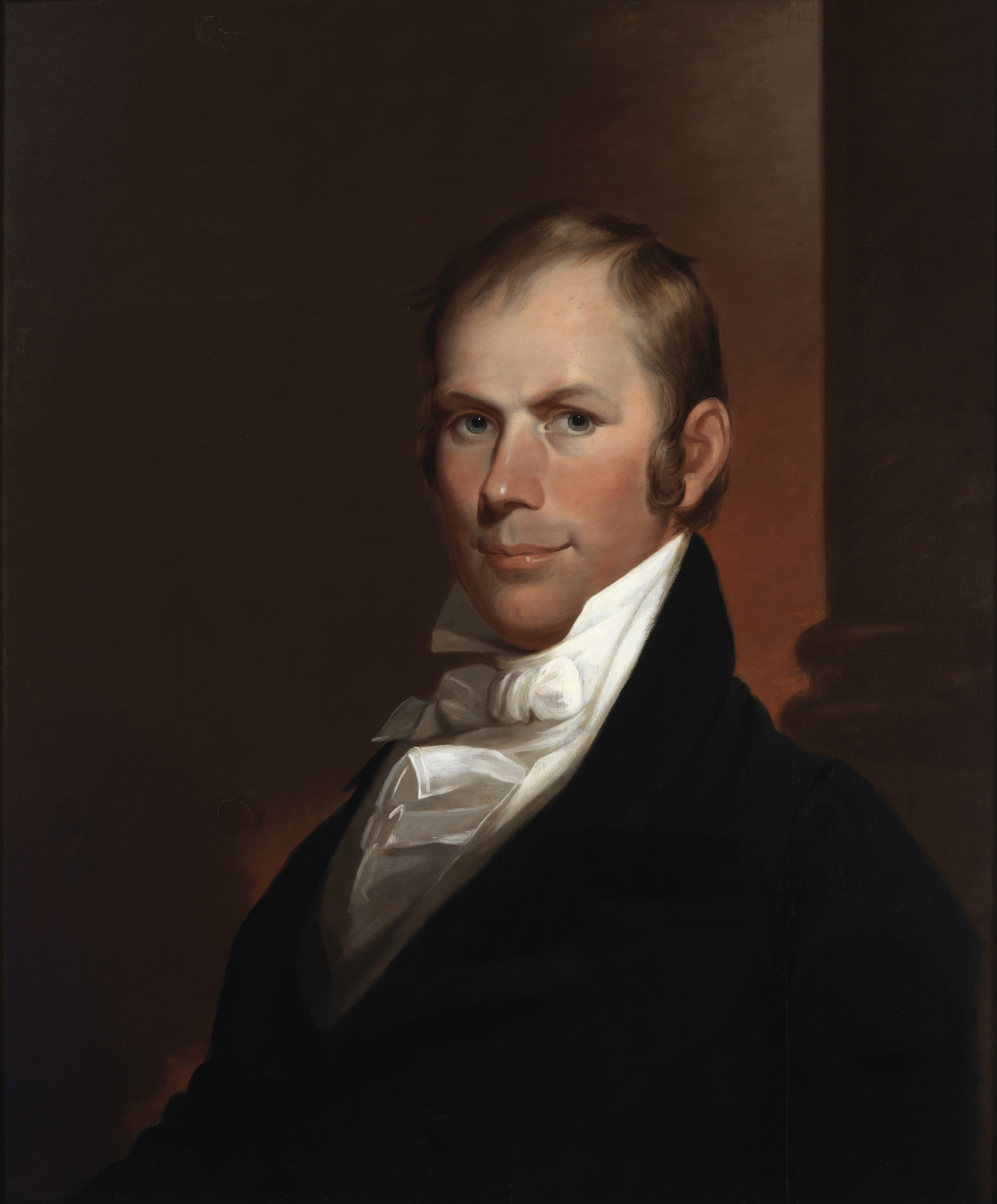
Portrait by Matthew Harris Jouett, 1818

In early 1819, a dispute erupted over the proposed statehood of Missouri after New York Congressman James Tallmadge Jr. introduced a legislative amendment that would provide for the gradual emancipation of Missouri's enslaved people. Though Clay had previously called for gradual emancipation in Kentucky, he sided with fellow Southerners in voting down Tallmadge's amendment. Clay instead supported Illinois Senator Jesse B. Thomas's compromise proposal in which Missouri would be admitted as a slave state, Maine would be admitted as a free state, (Note: Maine was part of Massachusetts prior to gaining statehood.) and slavery would be forbidden in the territories north of 36° 30' parallel. Clay helped assemble a coalition that passed the Missouri Compromise, as Thomas's proposal became known. Further controversy ensued when Missouri's constitution banned free blacks from entering the state, but Clay was able to engineer another compromise that allowed Missouri to join as a state in August 1821.

In foreign policy, Clay was a leading American supporter of the independence movements and revolutions that broke out in Latin America beginning in 1810. Clay frequently called on the Monroe administration to recognize the fledgling Latin American republics, but Monroe feared that doing so would derail his plans to acquire Spanish Florida. In 1818, General Andrew Jackson crossed into Spanish Florida to suppress raids by Seminole Indians. Though Jackson was following Monroe's implied wishes in entering Florida, he created additional controversy in seizing the Spanish town of Pensacola. Despite protests from Secretary of War Calhoun, Monroe and Adams decided to support Jackson's actions in the hope that they would convince Spain to sell Florida. Clay, however, was outraged, and he publicly condemned Jackson's decision to hang two foreign nationals without a trial. Before the House chamber, he compared Jackson to military dictators of the past, telling his colleagues "that Greece had her Alexander, Rome her Caesar, England her Cromwell, France her Bonaparte, and, that if we would escape the rock on which they split, we must avoid their errors." Jackson saw Clay's protestations as an attack on his character and thus began a long rivalry between Clay and Jackson. The rivalry and the controversy over Jackson's expedition temporarily subsided after the signing of the Adams–Onís Treaty, in which the U.S. purchased Florida and delineated its western boundary with New Spain.

==== 1824 presidential election ====
Clay helped Adams win the 1825 contingent House election after Clay failed to finish among the three electoral vote-winners. States in green voted for Crawford, states in orange for Adams, and states in blue for Jackson.

By 1822, several members of the Democratic-Republican Party had begun exploring presidential bids to succeed Monroe, who planned to retire after two terms like his predecessors. As the Federalist Party was near collapse, the 1824 presidential election would be contested only by members of the Democratic-Republican Party, including Clay. Having led the passage of the Tariff of 1824 and the General Survey Act, Clay campaigned on his American System of high tariffs and federal spending on infrastructure. Three members of Monroe's Cabinet, Secretary of the Treasury William Crawford, Secretary of State John Quincy Adams, and Secretary of War John C. Calhoun, appeared to be Clay's strongest competitors for the presidency. Though many, including Clay, did not take his candidacy seriously at first, General Andrew Jackson emerged as a presidential contender, eroding Clay's base of support in the western states. In February 1824, the sparsely attended Democratic-Republican congressional caucus endorsed Crawford's candidacy, but Crawford's rivals ignored the caucus results, and various state legislatures nominated candidates for president. During the campaign, Crawford suffered a major stroke, while Calhoun withdrew from the race after Jackson won the endorsement of the Pennsylvania legislature.

By 1824, with Crawford still in the race, Clay concluded that no candidate would win a majority of electoral votes; in that scenario, the House of Representatives would hold a contingent election to decide the election. Under the terms of the Twelfth Amendment, the top three electoral vote-getters would be eligible to be elected by the House. Clay was confident that he would prevail in a contingent held in the chamber he presided over, so long as he was eligible for election. Clay won Kentucky, Ohio, and Missouri, but his loss in New York and Louisiana relegated him to a fourth-place finish behind Adams, Jackson, and Crawford. Clay was humiliated that he finished behind the invalid Crawford and Jackson, but supporters of the three remaining presidential candidates immediately began courting his support for the contingent election.

For various reasons, supporters of all three candidates believed they had the best chance of winning Clay's backing, but Clay quickly settled on supporting Adams. Of the three candidates, Adams was the most sympathetic to Clay's American System, and Clay viewed both Jackson and the sickly Crawford as unsuitable for the presidency. On January 9, 1825, Clay privately met with Adams for three hours, after which Clay promised Adams his support; both would later claim that they did not discuss Clay's position in an Adams administration. With the help of Clay, Adams won the House vote on the first ballot. After his election, Adams offered Clay the position of secretary of state, which Clay accepted, despite fears that he would be accused of trading his support for the Cabinet post. Jackson was outraged by the election, and he and his supporters accused Clay and Adams of having reached a "Corrupt Bargain". Pro-Jackson forces immediately began preparing for the 1828 presidential election, with the Corrupt Bargain accusation becoming their central issue.

== Secretary of State ==
Clay served as secretary of state from 1825 to 1829. As secretary of state, he was the top foreign policy official in the Adams administration, but he also held several domestic duties, such as oversight of the patent office. Clay came to like Adams, a former rival, and to despise Jackson. They developed a strong working relationship. Adams and Clay were both wary of forming entangling alliances with the emerging states, and they continued to uphold the Monroe Doctrine, which called for European non-intervention in former colonies. Clay was rebuffed in his efforts to reach a commercial treaty and a settlement of the Canada–United States border with Britain, and was also unsuccessful in his attempts to make the French pay for damages arising from attacks on American shipping during the Napoleonic Wars. He had more success in negotiating commercial treaties with Latin American republics, reaching "most favoured nation" trade agreements in an attempt to ensure that no European country had a trading advantage over the United States. Seeking deeper relations with Latin American countries, Clay strongly favored sending American delegates to the Congress of Panama, but his efforts were defeated by opponents in the Senate.

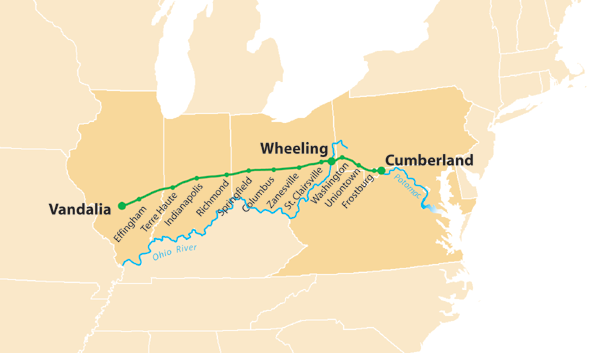
Clay supported construction of the National Road, which extended west from Cumberland, Maryland.

Adams proposed an ambitious domestic program based in large part on Clay's American System, but Clay warned the president that many of his proposals held little chance of passage in the 19th Congress. Adams's opponents defeated many of his proposals, including the establishment of a naval academy and a national observatory, but Adams did preside over the construction or initiation of major infrastructure projects like the National Road and the Chesapeake and Ohio Canal. Followers of Adams began to call themselves National Republicans, and Jackson's followers became known as Democrats. Both campaigns spread untrue stories about the opposing candidates. Adams' followers denounced Jackson as a demagogue, and some Adams-aligned papers accused Jackson's wife Rachel of bigamy. Though Clay was not directly involved in these attacks, his failure to denounce them earned him the lifelong enmity of Jackson.

Clay was one of Adams's most important political advisers, but because of his myriad responsibilities as secretary of state, he was often unable to take part in campaigning. As Adams was averse to the use of patronage for political purposes, Jackson's campaign enjoyed a marked advantage in organization, and Adams' allies such as Clay and Daniel Webster were unable to create an equally powerful organization headed by the president. In the 1828 election, Jackson took 56% of the popular vote and won almost every state outside of New England; Clay was especially distressed by Jackson's victory in Kentucky. The election result represented not only the victory of a man Clay viewed as unqualified and unprincipled but also a rejection of Clay's domestic policies.

== Later career ==
=== Jackson administration, 1829–1837 ===
==== Return to the Senate ====
Even with Clay out of office, President Jackson continued to see Clay as one of his major rivals, and Jackson at one point suspected Clay of being behind the Petticoat affair, a controversy involving the wives of his Cabinet members. Clay strongly opposed the 1830 Indian Removal Act, which authorized the administration to relocate Native Americans to land west of the Mississippi River. Another key point of contention between Clay and Jackson was the proposed Maysville Road, which would connect Maysville, Kentucky, to the National Road in Zanesville, Ohio; transportation advocates hoped that later extensions would eventually connect the National Road to New Orleans. In 1830, Jackson vetoed the project both because he felt that the road did not constitute interstate commerce, and also because he generally opposed using the federal government to promote economic modernization. While Jackson's veto garnered support from opponents of infrastructure spending, it damaged his base of support in Clay's home state of Kentucky. Clay returned to federal office in 1831 by winning election to the Senate over Richard Mentor Johnson in a 73 to 64 vote of the Kentucky legislature. His return to the Senate after 20 years, 8 months, 7 days out of office, marks the fourth-longest gap in service to the chamber in history.

==== Bank War and the 1832 presidential election ====
Andrew Jackson defeated Clay in the 1832 election

With the defeat of Adams, Clay became the de facto leader of the National Republicans, and he began making preparations for a presidential campaign in the 1832 election. In 1831, Jackson made it clear that he was going to run for re-election, ensuring that support or opposition to his presidency would be a central feature of the upcoming race. Jackson's Democrats rallied around his policies towards the national bank, internal improvements, Indian removal, and nullification, but these policies also earned Jackson various enemies, including Vice President John C. Calhoun. However, Clay rejected overtures from the fledgling Anti-Masonic Party, (Note: Though it adopted other policy issues, the Anti-Masonic Party strongly opposed the influence of Freemasonry; Jackson and Clay were both Freemasons. Though he not been active Freemason since 1824, Clay refused to openly condemn the organization.) and his attempt to convince Calhoun to serve as his running mate failed, leaving the opposition to Jackson split among different factions. Inspired by the Anti-Masonic Party's national convention, Clay's National Republican followers arranged for a national convention that nominated Clay for president.

As the 1832 election approached, the debate over the re-authorization of the national bank emerged as the most important issue in the campaign. By the early 1830s, the national bank had become the largest corporation in the United States, and banknotes issued by the national bank served as the de facto legal tender of the United States. Jackson disliked the national bank because of a hatred of both banks and paper currency. The bank's charter did not expire until 1836, but bank president Nicholas Biddle asked for renewal in 1831, hoping that election year pressure and support from Secretary of the Treasury Louis McLane would convince Jackson to allow the re-charter. Biddle's application set off the "Bank War"; Congress passed a bill to renew the national bank's charter, but Jackson vetoed it, holding the bank to be unconstitutional. Clay had initially hoped that the national bank re-charter would work to his advantage, but Jackson's allies seized on the issue, redefining the 1832 election as a choice between the president and a "monied oligarchy". Ultimately, Clay was unable to defeat a popular sitting president. Jackson won 219 of the 286 electoral votes and 54.2% of the popular vote, carrying almost every state outside of New England.

==== Nullification Crisis ====
The high rates of the Tariff of 1828 and the Tariff of 1832 angered many Southerners because they resulted in higher prices for imported goods. After the 1832 election, South Carolina held a state convention that declared the tariff rates of 1828 and 1832 to be nullified within the state, and further declared that federal collection of import duties would be illegal after January 1833. In response to this Nullification Crisis, Jackson issued his Proclamation to the People of South Carolina, which strongly denied the right of states to nullify federal laws or secede. He asked Congress to pass what became known as the Force Bill, which would authorize the president to send federal soldiers against South Carolina if it sought to nullify federal law.

Though Clay favored high tariff rates, he found Jackson's strong rhetoric against South Carolina distressing and sought to avoid a crisis that could end in civil war. He proposed a compromise tariff bill that would lower tariff rates, but do so gradually, thereby giving manufacturing interests time to adapt to less protective rates. Clay's compromise tariff won the backing of both manufacturers, who believed they would not receive a better deal, and Calhoun, who sought a way out of the crisis but refused to work with President Jackson's supporters on an alternative tariff bill. Though most members of Clay's own National Republican Party opposed it, the Tariff of 1833 passed both houses of Congress. Jackson simultaneously signed the tariff bill and the Force bill, and South Carolina leaders accepted the new tariff, effectively bringing the crisis to an end. Clay's role in resolving the crisis brought him renewed national stature in the wake of a crushing presidential election defeat, and some began referring to him as the "Great Compromiser".

==== Formation of the Whig Party ====
Following the end of the Nullification Crisis in March 1833, Jackson renewed his offensive against the national bank, despite some opposition from within his own Cabinet. Jackson and Secretary of the Treasury Roger Taney pursued a policy of removing all federal deposits from the national bank and placing them in state-chartered banks known as "pet banks". Because federal law required the president to deposit federal revenue in the national bank so long as it was financially stable, many regarded Jackson's actions as illegal, and Clay led the passage of a Senate motion censuring Jackson. Nonetheless, the national bank's federal charter expired in 1836, and though the institution continued to function under a Pennsylvania charter, it never regained the influence it had had at the beginning of Jackson's administration.

The removal of deposits helped unite Jackson's opponents into one party for the first time, as National Republicans, Calhounites, former Democrats, and members of the Anti-Masonic Party coalesced into the Whig Party. The term "Whig" originated from a speech Clay delivered in 1834, in which he compared opponents of Jackson to the Whigs, a British political party opposed to absolute monarchy. Neither the Whigs nor the Democrats were unified geographically or ideologically. However, Whigs tended to favor a stronger legislature, a stronger federal government, a higher tariff, greater spending on infrastructure, re-authorization of the Second Bank of the United States, and publicly funded education. Conversely, Democrats tended to favor a stronger president, stronger state governments, lower tariffs, hard money, and expansionism. Neither party took a strong national stand on slavery. The Whig base of support lay in wealthy businessmen, professionals, the professional class, and large planters, while the Democratic base of support lay in immigrant Catholics and yeomen farmers, but each party appealed across class lines.

Partly due to grief over the death of his daughter, Anne, Clay chose not to run in the 1836 presidential election, and the Whigs were too disorganized to nominate a single candidate. Three Whig candidates ran against Van Buren: General William Henry Harrison, Senator Hugh Lawson White, and Senator Daniel Webster. By running multiple candidates, the Whigs hoped to force a contingent election in the House of Representatives. Clay personally preferred Webster, but he threw his backing behind Harrison who had the broadest appeal among voters. Clay's decision not to endorse Webster opened a rift between the two Whig party leaders, and Webster would work against Clay in future presidential elections. Despite the presence of multiple Whig candidates, Van Buren won the 1836 election with 50.8 percent of the popular vote and 170 of the 294 electoral votes.

=== Van Buren administration, 1837–1841 ===
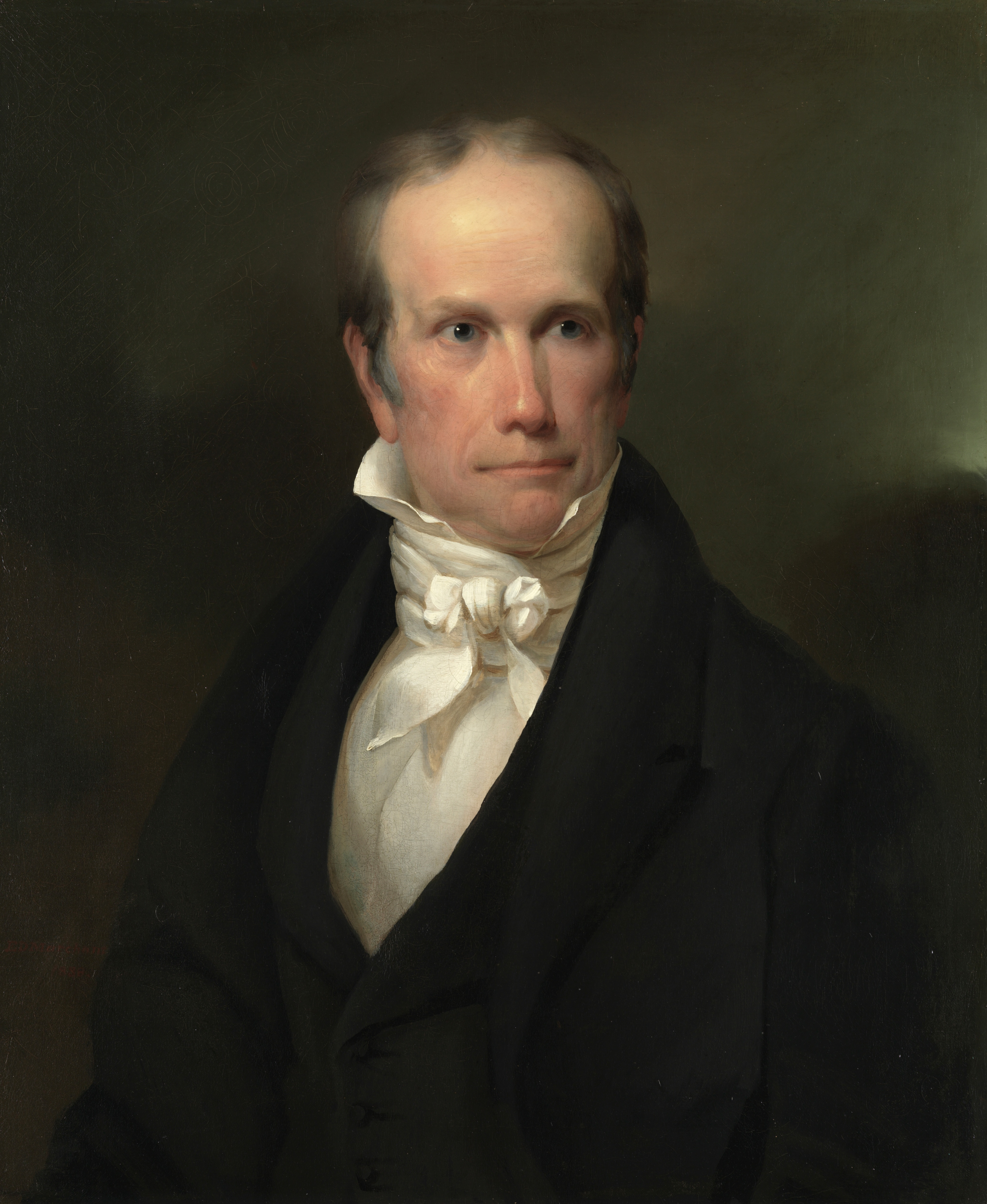
Portrait by Edward Dalton Marchant, c. 1838

Clay (green) won the backing of several state delegations on the first ballot of the 1839 Whig National Convention, but William Henry Harrison ultimately won the party's presidential nomination.

Van Buren's presidency was affected badly by the Panic of 1837, a major recession that badly damaged the Democratic Party. Clay and other Whigs argued that Jackson's policies, including the use of pet banks, had encouraged speculation and caused the panic. He promoted the American System as a means for economic recovery, but President Van Buren's response focused on the practice of "strict economy and frugality". As the 1840 presidential election approached, many expected that the Whigs would win control of the presidency due to the ongoing economic crisis. Clay initially viewed Webster as his strongest rival, but Clay, Harrison, and General Winfield Scott emerged as the principal candidates at the 1839 Whig National Convention.

Though he was widely regarded as the most qualified Whig leader to serve as president, many Whigs questioned Clay's electability after two presidential election defeats. He also faced opposition in the North due to his ownership of enslaved people and lingering association with the Freemasons, and in the South from Whigs who distrusted his moderate stance on slavery. Clay won a plurality on the first ballot of the Whig National Convention, but, with the help of Thurlow Weed and other backers, Harrison consolidated support on subsequent ballots and won the Whig presidential nomination on the fifth ballot of the convention. (Note: During the balloting, Clay and Scott played cards with Whig politicians John J. Crittenden and George Evans at the Astor House hotel in New York City. When the group received word of Harrison's victory, Clay blamed his loss on Scott and struck him, with the blow landing on the shoulder which had been wounded during Scott's participation in the Battle of Lundy's Lane. Afterwards Clay had to be physically removed from the hotel room. Scott then sent Crittenden to Clay with Scott's challenge for a duel, but Crittenden reconciled them by convincing Clay to apologize.) Seeking to placate Clay's supporters and to balance the ticket geographically, the convention chose former Virginia Governor and Senator John Tyler, a personal friend of Clay, whose previous career in the Democratic Party had practically come to an end, as the vice-presidential nominee. Clay was disappointed by the outcome but helped Harrison's ultimately successful campaign by delivering numerous speeches. With Whigs also winning control of Congress in the 1840 elections, Clay saw the upcoming 27th Congress as an opportunity for the Whig Party to establish itself as the dominant political party by leading the country out of recession.

=== Harrison and Tyler administrations, 1841–1845 ===
President-elect Harrison asked Clay to serve another term as Secretary of State, but Clay chose to remain in Congress. Webster was instead chosen as Secretary of State, while John J. Crittenden, a close ally of Clay, was chosen as Attorney General. As Harrison prepared to take office, Clay and Harrison clashed over the leadership of the Whig Party, with Harrison sensitive to accusations that he would answer to Clay. Just a month into his presidency, Harrison died of an illness and was succeeded by Vice President John Tyler. Tyler retained Harrison's Cabinet, but the former Democrat and avid follower of both Jefferson's and Jackson's philosophy quickly made it known that he had reservations about re-establishing a national bank, a key priority of Clay's. Clay nonetheless initially expected that Tyler would approve the measures passed by the Whig-controlled Congress; his priorities included the re-establishment of the national bank, higher tariff rates, a national bankruptcy law, and an act to distribute the proceeds of land sales to the states for investments in infrastructure and education. Clay and his congressional allies attempted to craft a national bank bill acceptable to Tyler, but Tyler vetoed two separate bills to re-establish the national bank, showing that he in fact had no will to reach a solution for the party's issues. Clay and other Whig leaders were now outraged not only by Tyler's rejection of the Whig party platform but also because they felt that Tyler had purposely misled them into thinking that he would sign the bills.

After the second veto, congressional Whigs voted to expel Tyler from the party, and on Clay's request, every Cabinet member except for Webster, who wanted to continue negotiating the Webster-Ashburton Treaty with Great Britain about the border to Canada, resigned from office. This made Tyler increasingly move closer to his former Democratic Party and, with Webster still serving in the Tyler administration, Clay emerged as the clear leader of the Whig Party. In early 1842, Clay resigned from the Senate after arranging for Crittenden to succeed him. Though he vetoed other Whig bills, Tyler did sign some Whig priorities into law, including the Preemption Act of 1841, which distributed the proceeds of land sales to the states, and the Bankruptcy Act of 1841, which was the first law in U.S. history that allowed for voluntary bankruptcy. Facing a large budget deficit, Tyler also signed the Tariff of 1842, which restored the protective rates of the Tariff of 1832 but ended the distribution policy that had been established with the Preemption Act of 1841.

==== 1844 presidential election ====
James K. Polk narrowly defeated Clay in the 1844 election.

President Tyler's break with the Whig Party, combined with Webster's continuing affiliation with Tyler, positioned Clay as the leading contender for the Whig nomination in the 1844 presidential election. By 1842, most observers believed that Clay would face Van Buren in the 1844 presidential election, as he had still remained as the clear leader of the Democrats and, following the tradition of the founders, wanted a second term. Hoping to win another term, President Tyler forged an alliance with John C. Calhoun and pursued the annexation of the Republic of Texas, which would add another slave state to the union. After President Tyler concluded an annexation treaty with Texas, Clay announced his opposition to annexation. He argued that the country needed "union, peace, and patience", and annexation would bring tensions over slavery and war with Mexico. The same day that Clay published a letter opposing the annexation of Texas, (Note: According to local tradition, the famous "Raleigh Letter" of April 17, 1844 was written under the shade of a large white oak which became known as the Henry Clay Oak.) Van Buren also came out against annexation, giving similar reasons that Clay did, so that slavery and especially expansionism seemed to play no role in the next election. (Note: Some writers have come to the conclusion that Clay and Van Buren had reached an agreement to jointly oppose annexation, but Klotter writes that "no real evidence" supports this conclusion.)

Clay unanimously won the presidential nomination at the 1844 Whig National Convention, but a minority of expansionist Southern Democrats, encouraged by Tyler's alternative outline, blocked Van Buren's nomination at the 1844 Democratic National Convention for countless ballots, until Van Buren withdrew, making place for an unexpected compromise candidate: The party nominated former Speaker of the House James K. Polk of Tennessee, who favored annexation, but in order to calm anti-expansionists, promised to just run for a single term. Following the nomination of a pro-annexation Democrat, Tyler soon withdrew his incipient independent bid for re-election and endorsed Polk.

Clay was surprised by Van Buren's defeat but remained confident of his chances in the 1844 election. Polk was the first "dark horse" presidential nominee in U.S. history, and Whigs mocked him as a "fourth rate politician". Despite his relative lack of national stature, Polk proved to be a strong candidate capable of uniting the factions of the Democratic Party and winning the support of Southerners who had been reluctant to support Van Buren. Clay's stance on slavery alienated some voters in both the North and the South. Pro-slavery Southerners flocked to Polk, while many Northern abolitionists, who tended to align with the Whig Party, favored James G. Birney of the Liberty Party. Clay's opposition to annexation damaged his campaign in the South, as Democrats argued that he worked in unison with Northerners to stop the extension of slavery. In July, Clay wrote two letters in which he attempted to clarify his position on the annexation of Texas, and Democrats attacked his supposedly inconsistent position.

Polk narrowly won the election, taking 49.5% of the popular vote to Clay's 48.1% and winning 170 of the 275 electoral votes. (Note: Clay received a significant share of the presidential electoral vote in three separate elections, a feat matched only by John Adams, Thomas Jefferson, Andrew Jackson, Grover Cleveland, Franklin D. Roosevelt, Richard Nixon, and William Jennings Bryan, with only the latter (like Clay) failing to ever win a presidential election.) Birney won several thousand anti-annexation votes in New York, and his presence in the race may have cost Clay the election. Most of Clay's contemporaries believed that annexation had been the decisive issue in the race, but Polk's savvy campaigning on the tariff may have also been decisive, as he narrowly won pro-tariff Pennsylvania after downplaying his anti-tariff views. After Polk's victory and the final indirect success of Tyler's strategy, Congress approved the annexation of Texas, which was signed by Tyler on his last day in office, and Texas gained statehood in late 1845.

=== Polk administration, 1845–1849 ===
Clay (green) won the backing of numerous delegates on the first ballot of the 1848 Whig National Convention, but Zachary Taylor ultimately won the party's presidential nomination.

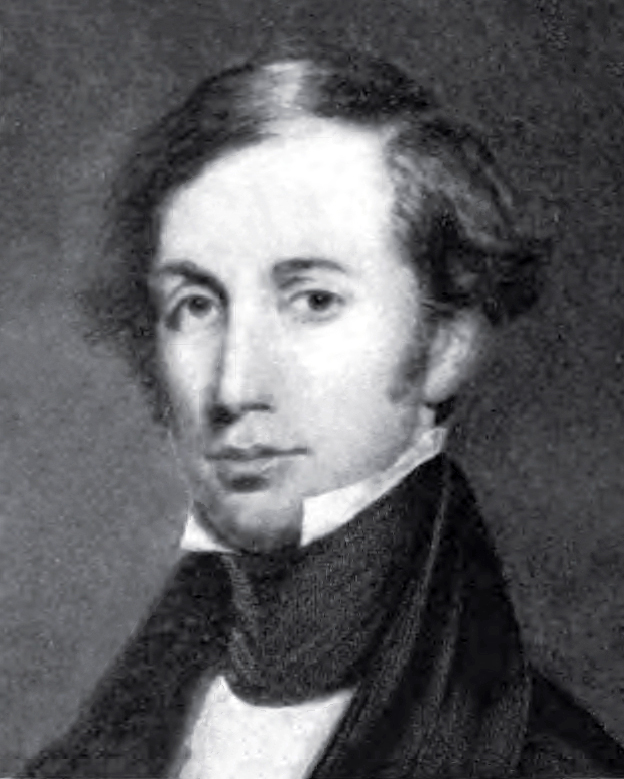
Henry Clay Jr., who died serving in the Mexican–American War

After the 1844 election, Clay returned to his career as an attorney. Though he was no longer a member of Congress, he remained closely interested in national politics. In 1846, the Mexican–American War broke out after American and Mexican forces clashed at the disputed border region between Mexico and Texas. Initially, Clay did not publicly oppose the war, but privately he saw it as an immoral war that risked producing "some military chieftain who will conquer us all." He suffered a personal blow in 1847 when his son, Henry Clay Jr., died at the Battle of Buena Vista. In November 1847, Clay re-emerged on the political scene with a speech that was harshly critical of the Mexican–American War and President Polk. He attacked Polk for fomenting the conflict with Mexico and urged the rejection of any treaty that added new slave territory to the United States. Months after the speech, the Senate ratified the Treaty of Guadalupe Hidalgo, in which Mexico ceded hundreds of thousands of square miles of territory known as the Mexican Cession.

By 1847, General Zachary Taylor, who commanded the American forces at Buena Vista, had emerged as a contender for the Whig nomination in the 1848 presidential election. Despite Taylor's largely unknown political views, many Whigs believed he was the party's strongest possible candidate due to his martial accomplishments in the Mexican–American War. One of Clay's most trusted allies and advisers, John J. Crittenden, was Taylor's de facto campaign manager. Clay had initially told his allies that he would not run in the 1848 presidential election, but he was unwilling to support Taylor, a "mere military man". On April 10, 1848, he announced his candidacy for the Whig nomination. Although Webster and Winfield Scott each commanded a limited base of support in the party, Taylor and Clay each saw the other as their lone serious rival for the Whig nomination. As Taylor commanded the support of most Southern Whigs, Clay focused his efforts on courting Northern Whigs, emphasizing his opposition to the Mexican–American War and his life-long support for the gradual emancipation of enslaved people in Kentucky. Clay presented a strong challenge to Taylor at the 1848 Whig National Convention, but Taylor won the presidential nomination on the fourth ballot. Partially in an attempt to please the Clay wing of the party, the convention nominated Millard Fillmore as Taylor's running mate. Clay was embittered by his failure at the convention, and he did not campaign on behalf of Taylor. Nonetheless, Taylor won the election, taking 47.3 percent of the popular vote and 163 of 290 electoral votes.

=== Taylor and Fillmore administrations, 1849–1852 ===
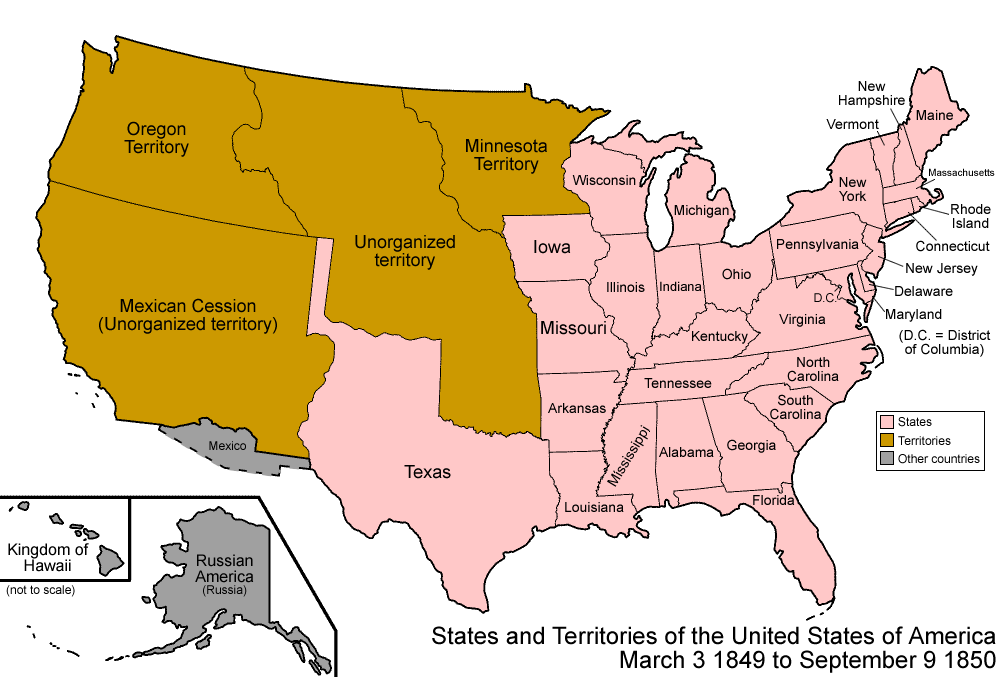
The United States after the ratification of the Treaty of Guadalupe Hidalgo, with the Mexican Cession still unorganized

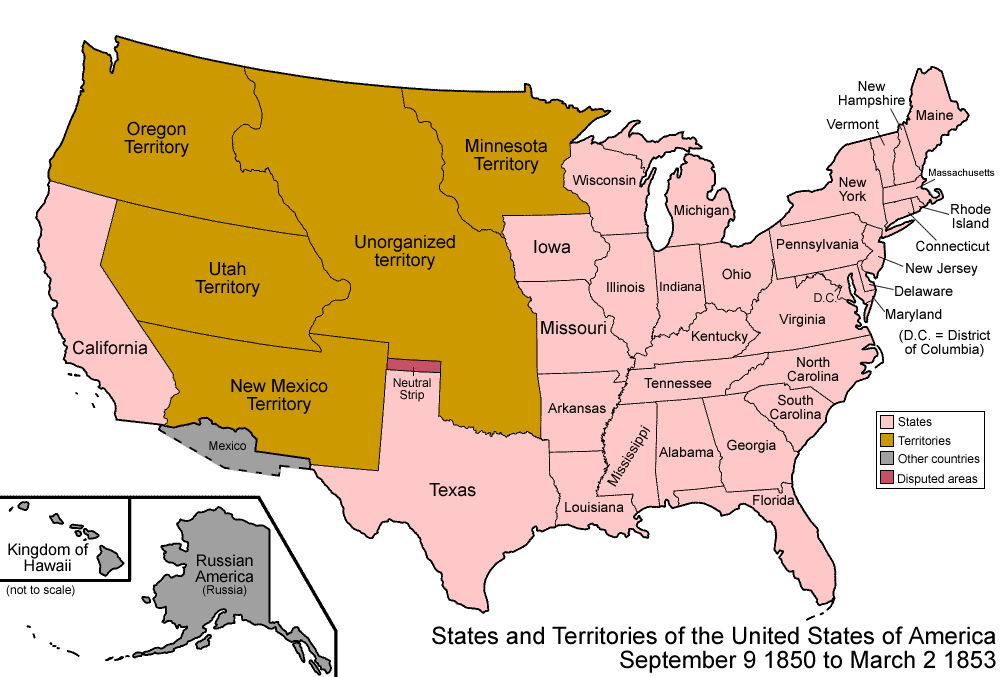
The United States after the Compromise of 1850

Increasingly worried about the sectional tensions arising over the issue of slavery in newly acquired territories, Clay accepted election to the Senate in 1849. Having refused to campaign for Taylor, Clay played little role in the formation of Taylor's Cabinet or in determining the new administration's policies. In January 1850, with Congress still deadlocked regarding the status of the Mexican Cession, Clay proposed a compromise designed to organize territory acquired in the Mexican–American War and address other issues contributing to sectional tensions. His legislative package included the admission of California as a free state, the cession by Texas of some of its northern and western territorial claims in return for debt relief, the establishment of New Mexico and Utah territories, a ban on the importation of enslaved people into the District of Columbia for sale, and a more stringent fugitive slave law. Though it faced opposition from Southern extremists like Calhoun and Northern abolitionists like William Seward, Clay's proposal won the backing of many Southern and Northern leaders.

President Taylor, who favored the immediate admission of California and New Mexico as free states without any attached conditions, opposed the plan, and Clay openly broke with the president in May 1850. Debate over Clay's proposal continued into July when Taylor unexpectedly died of an illness. After Taylor's death, President Fillmore, who supported Clay's compromise bill, consulted with Clay in appointing a new Cabinet. Exhausted by the debate in the Senate, Clay took a leave of absence shortly after Taylor's death, but Fillmore, Webster, and Democratic Senator Stephen A. Douglas took charge of pro-compromise forces. By the end of September 1850, Clay's proposal, which became known as the Compromise of 1850, had been enacted. Though contemporaries credited Fillmore, Douglas, and Webster for their role in passing the Compromise of 1850, Clay was widely regarded as the key figure in ending a major sectional crisis.

== Death ==
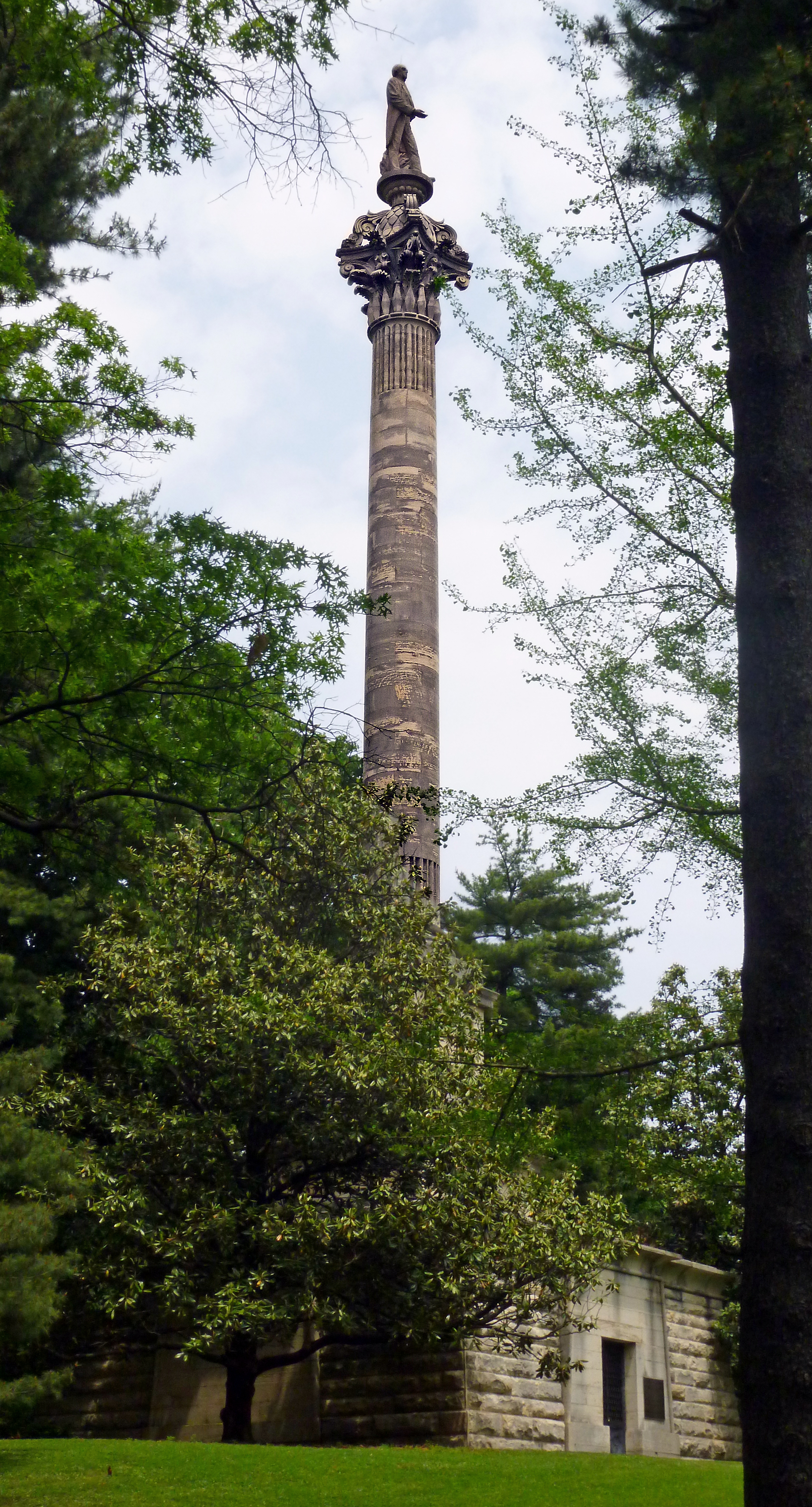
Henry Clay monument and mausoleum, Lexington Cemetery

In December 1851, at the age of 74, with his health declining, Clay announced that he would resign from the Senate the following September. Clay never recovered from his illnesses. He eventually died of tuberculosis aged 75 in his room at the National Hotel in Washington, D.C., on June 29, 1852. He was the first person to lie in state in the United States Capitol rotunda.

His headstone reads: "I know no North—no South—no East—no West". Hymn writer Fanny Crosby penned this line of lament on Clay's death:

Sleep on, oh, statesman, sleep
Within thy hallowed tomb,
Where pearly streamlets glide,
And summer roses bloom.

== Ideology and slavery ==
=== American System ===
Throughout most of his political life, Clay promoted his American System as both an economic program and a means for unifying the country. Clay's American System rejected strict constructionism in favor of an activist government that would promote industry and commerce. The American System had four key tenets: high tariffs, a stable financial system, federal investment in internal improvements, and a public land sale policy designed to raise revenue and provide for carefully managed expansion into the American frontier. Through high tariffs, Clay hoped to free the United States from dependence on foreign imports, especially from Britain. Clay sought to ensure a stable financial system through support for the national bank, which regulated the country's banking system and helped ensure a consistent supply of credit. Clay's support for federally financed internal improvements stemmed from his belief that only the federal government could construct the transportation system necessary for uniting the country commercially and culturally. His land policy focused on using federal revenue from land sales to fund states' investments in education, infrastructure projects, and other priorities.

=== Practices as an enslaver and the Dupuy case ===
Clay inherited slaves as a young child, and he continued to own slaves throughout his life. In the 1790s, he adopted anti-slavery views under the influence of his mentor, Founding Father George Wythe, who manumitted the people he enslaved. Like most of his contemporaries, Clay was not a racial egalitarian and never called for the immediate abolition of slavery, but he viewed slavery as a "grievous wrong to the slave" and spoke in favor of equal treatment for free blacks. Early in his career, Clay favored gradual emancipation in both Kentucky and Missouri, but each state rejected plans that would have provided for gradual emancipation. Clay continued to support gradual emancipation throughout his career and published an open letter in 1849 calling for gradual emancipation in Kentucky, though he qualified this view by stating he would only support emancipation if it included a plan for colonizing free blacks outside of the state. Unlike many other Southern leaders, he consistently favored recognition of Haiti, which had been established through a slave revolt.

In 1816, Clay helped establish the American Colonization Society, a group that wanted to establish a colony for free American blacks in Africa. The group was made up of abolitionists who wanted to end slavery and slaveholders who wanted to deport free blacks. Clay's support for colonization reflected his belief that a multiracial society was ultimately unworkable, both for whites and free blacks. Under Clay's plan, all enslaved children born after 1860 would be freed at age 25. At that time, they were to work for three years in order to finance their own importation. During this period, slaveholders could still sell or mortgage their property. Some abolitionists did not view this plan favorably. In 1849, Frederick Douglass denounced this plan in a speech to the New England Anti-Slavery Society at Faneuil Hall. He objected to the three years when the enslaved were in jeopardy as they were still held as property. The date of 1860 would lead to family separations as those born before 1860 would remain enslaved and those born after were subjected to a mandatory importation. Those gathered first applauded at the mention of Clay; however, once Douglass made these points, those gathered change their response to hisses and cries of shame. Later in his career, Clay became increasingly concerned about abolitionism, remarking that "the ultraism of the South on the one hand ... and the ultraism of abolition on the other" represented the greatest threat to the Union. Nonetheless, he consistently defended the right of abolitionists to send materials through the mail and opposed the gag rule, which limited congressional debate on slavery.

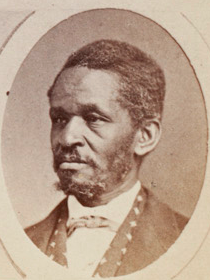
Lewis Hayden's wife and child were enslaved by Clay. The three journeyed via the Underground Railroad to Amherstburg, Ontario. The couple became prominent abolitionists and later resided in Boston. Lewis was elected in 1873 to the state legislature.

On his 600-acre plantation, there were 122 slaves held over the course of his life. Clay's status as a slave owner and his anti-slavery views occasionally led to conflicts in his political career. During a visit to Indiana in the 1840s, Clay was confronted at a political meeting by a Quaker abolitionist, Hiram Mendenhall, who presented Clay with a petition calling on him to free his slaves. Clay dismissed Mendenhall out of hand, stating that the petition was no different from if it demanded he give up his farm. Many of his contemporaries, including anti-slavery activist James G. Birney, believed that Clay's home state of Kentucky had the laws most permissive to slaves of any slave state. Clay considered himself to be a "good" master. Biographer James C. Klotter concludes that Clay took actions, such as keeping families together, to mitigate the harshness of slavery; however, showing the opposite is his treatment of the family of Lewis Hayden. Klotter also states that there is no evidence that Clay ever sexually abused the people he enslaved. Others state quite the contrary of his punitive and sexual practices.

In 1844, Clay's wife discovered that he was having relations with the "yellow girl that attended his poultry and fowls". The young woman and her children were then sent to Louisiana to be sold. While in Washington, D.C., Clay acquired an octoroon to serve as concubine. Phoebe Moore, age 16, was purchased by Henry Clay from his wife's cousin, Senator Thomas Hart Benton, according to her obituary in New Orleans Times-Picayune. When he was in Washington, she resided with Clay in his Washington home and bore him two children. After he emancipated her, she moved to Memphis, Tennessee.

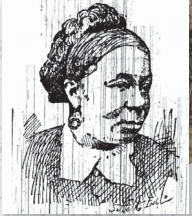
The Hayden household sheltered hundreds of blacks seeking freedom; it was said they "harbored 75 percent of all slaves passing through Boston". Following the passage of the Fugitive Slave Act in 1850, Harriet Hayden managed and operated Boston's main Underground Railroad operations, and was key to leading people through Boston's tunnel system.

Regarding keeping families together, Clay applied the opposite to the family of Lewis Hayden. Around 1836, Clay had an enslaved mother, Esther Harvey, and her son sold South. They were the family of Lewis Hayden, a waiter at the upscale Phoenix Hotel. Around 1842, Hayden was threatened, also by Clay, with the sale of his second wife, Harriet Bell Hayden and her son Joseph who he had adopted. Hayden secured the aid of Vermont resident Delia Webster and Oberlin College student Rev. Calvin Fairbank through the assistance of John Mifflin, AME minister and resident of Oberlin, Ohio. They crafted a successful escape plan via the Underground Railroad through Maysville, Kentucky, across the Ohio River to the free states of Ohio and Michigan. The Haydens became residents of Amherstburg, Ontario, Canada. On January 4, 1845, Webster received a sentence of two years hard labor for her part in the escape; she was pardoned on February 24, 1845. Also during February, Fairbank was sentenced to 15 years. The Kentucky governor pardoned him in 1849. However, he was imprisoned again in 1852 and served 12 years for aiding in another escape.

Another example is Lewis Richardson, Clay's escaped slave. He gave a speech that belies Clay's self-portrayal as a "good master". Richardson had been a slave at Ashland for 20 years, and after a beating escaped via the Underground Railroad in January, 1846. By May of that year, Richardson was also living in Amherstburg, Ontario. In a speech he gave at Union Chapel there, he told not only of continual sparse food and lack of warm clothing but of 150 lashes from overseer Ambrose Brice for the offense of being an hour late returning from a visit to his wife. Brice later denied this claim, stating it was 16 lashes, and the offense was drunkenness. Clay was away on business when this occurred. Richardson's speech was published in the abolitionist newspaper Signal of Liberty. The text of his speech is available at the following reference.

In 1829, Charlotte Dupuy, who was enslaved by Clay, sued for her freedom while visiting relatives in Maryland. Dupuy's attorney gained an order from the court for her to remain in Washington until the case was settled, and she worked for wages for 18 months for Martin Van Buren, Clay's successor as secretary of state. The case embarrassed Clay politically and personally, but he ultimately prevailed in court. After winning the case, Clay sent Dupuy to New Orleans, causing her to be away from her own family, but he later freed Dupuy and two of her children. Aaron Dupuy, Charlotte's husband, was ordered by Clay to be whipped, at the behest of Clay's wife, Lucretia. Dupuy's infraction was a late return as Lucretia's carriage driver. The overseer attempted the whipping, but Dupuy managed to wrest the whip away and began beating the overseer. He was not freed at the time of Clay's death, but became freed after the Civil War. Clay himself wrote, "here in Kentucky slavery is in its most mitigated form, still it is slavery." Clay's will provided for the gradual emancipation of the slaves he held at the time of his death in 1852. Aaron Dupuy was an exception. Clay also stipulated that several of those enslaved people were bequeathed to his son, John.

== Legacy ==
=== Historical reputation ===
Clay's Whig Party collapsed four years after his death, but Clay cast a long shadow over the generation of political leaders that presided over the Civil War. Mississippi Senator Henry S. Foote stated his opinion that "had there been one such man in the Congress of the United States as Henry Clay in 1860–1861 there would, I feel sure, have been no civil war". Clay's protege and fellow Kentuckian John J. Crittenden attempted to keep the Union together with the formation of the Constitutional Union Party and the proposed Crittenden Compromise. Though Crittenden's efforts were unsuccessful, Kentucky remained in the Union during the Civil War, reflecting in part Clay's continuing influence. Abraham Lincoln was a great admirer of Clay, saying he was "my ideal of a great man". Lincoln wholeheartedly supported Clay's economic programs; prior to the Civil War, he also held similar stances about slavery and the Union. Some historians have argued that a Clay victory in the 1844 election would have prevented both the Mexican-American War and the American Civil War.

External videos
- Presentation by James Klotter on the life and career of Henry Clay, February 11, 2011, C-SPAN

Clay is generally regarded as one of the important political figures of his era. Most historians and political scientists consider Clay to be one of the most influential speakers of the house in U.S. history. In 1957, a Senate Committee selected Clay as one of the five greatest U.S. senators, along with Daniel Webster, John C. Calhoun, Robert La Follette, and Robert A. Taft. A 1986 survey of historians ranked Clay as the greatest senator in U.S. history, while a 2006 survey of historians ranked Clay as the 31st-most influential American of all time. A 1998 poll of historians ranked Clay as the most qualified unsuccessful major party presidential nominee in U.S. history. In 2015, political scientist Michael G. Miller and historian Ken Owen ranked Clay as one of the four most influential American politicians who never served as president, alongside Alexander Hamilton, William Jennings Bryan, and Calhoun. Noting Clay's influence over the United States in the last three decades of his life, biographer James Klotter writes that "perhaps posterity should no longer call it the Jacksonian Era ... and instead term it the Clay Era."

=== Monuments and memorials ===
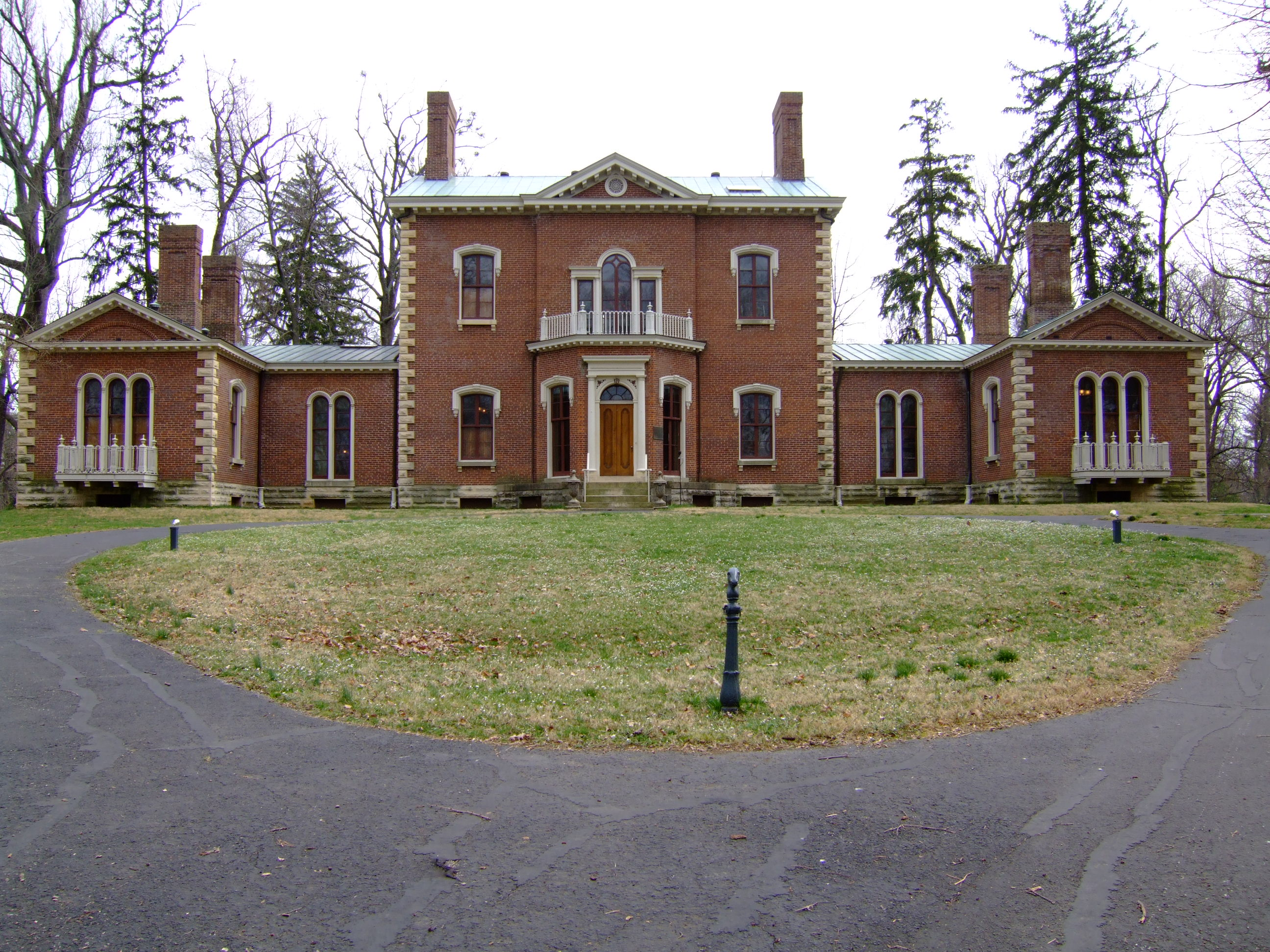
Clay's estate, Ashland, in Lexington, Kentucky

Many monuments, memorials, and even high schools have been erected and named in honor of Clay. Sixteen counties, one each in Alabama, Florida, Georgia, Illinois, Indiana, Kansas, Kentucky, Minnesota, Mississippi, Missouri, Nebraska, North Carolina, South Dakota, Tennessee, Texas, and West Virginia, are named for Clay. Communities named for Clay include Clay, Kentucky, Clay, West Virginia, Claysville, Alabama and Claysville, Pennsylvania. The United States Navy named a submarine, the USS Henry Clay, in his honor. Several statues honor Clay, including the Henry Clay Monument in Pottsville, Pennsylvania, and one of Kentucky's two statues in the National Statuary Hall Collection. Clay's estate of Ashland is a National Historic Landmark. The Decatur House, Clay's home in Washington, D.C. during his tenure as secretary of state, is also a National Historic Landmark. Due to his involvement in the American Colonization Society, a town in the newly formed Liberia in West Africa was named Clay-Ashland after Henry Clay and to where the freed enslaved people from Kentucky emigrated. Clay is also one of the "famous five" senators honored with their portraits in the Senate Reception Room.

"He loved his country partly because it was his own country, but mostly because it was a free country." — Lincoln's Eulogy for Henry Clay – July 6, 1852

== See also ==
- Nathaniel G. S. Hart, member of the prominent Hart family of Kentucky and Henry Clay's brother-in-law who was severely wounded during the Battle of Frenchtown and afterwards murdered by Indigenous allies of the British
- Amicus curiae (lit. 'friend of the court'), a lawyer who argues as a non-party

== Notes ==
U.S. Senate
Preceded by John Adair	United States Senator (Class 3) from Kentucky; 1806–1807; Served alongside: Buckner Thruston	Succeeded by John Pope
Preceded by Buckner Thruston	United States Senator (Class 2) from Kentucky; 1810–1811; Served alongside: John Pope	Succeeded by George M. Bibb
Preceded by John Rowan	United States Senator (Class 3) from Kentucky; 1831–1842; Served alongside: George M. Bibb, John J. Crittenden, James Turner Morehead	Succeeded by John J. Crittenden
Preceded by Thomas Metcalfe	United States Senator (Class 3) from Kentucky; 1849–1852; Served alongside: Joseph R. Underwood	Succeeded by David Meriwether
Preceded by William Wilkins	Chair of the Senate Foreign Relations Committee; 1834–1836	Succeeded by James Buchanan
Preceded by Silas Wright	Chair of the Senate Finance Committee; 1841	Succeeded by George Evans
Honorary titles
Preceded by Thomas Worthington	Baby of the Senate; 1806–1807	Succeeded by James Fenner
Preceded by William Plumer	Most senior living U.S. senator (Sitting or former); 1850–1852	Succeeded by Elisha Mathewson
First	Persons who have lain in state or honor in the United States Capitol rotunda July 1, 1852	Succeeded by Abraham Lincoln
U.S. House of Representatives
Preceded by William T. Barry	Member of the U.S. House of Representatives from Kentucky's 5th congressional district 1811–1813	Succeeded by Samuel Hopkins
Preceded by Samuel McKee	Member of the U.S. House of Representatives from Kentucky's 2nd congressional district 1813–1814	Succeeded by Joseph H. Hawkins
Preceded by Joseph H. Hawkins	Member of the U.S. House of Representatives from Kentucky's 2nd congressional district 1815–1821	Succeeded by Samuel H. Woodson
Preceded by John Telemachus Johnson	Member of the U.S. House of Representatives from Kentucky's 3rd congressional district 1823–1825	Succeeded by James Clark
Political offices
Preceded by Joseph Bradley Varnum	Speaker of the United States House of Representatives; 1811–1814	Succeeded by Langdon Cheves
Preceded by Langdon Cheves	Speaker of the United States House of Representatives; 1815–1820	Succeeded by John W. Taylor
Preceded by Philip P. Barbour	Speaker of the United States House of Representatives; 1823–1825	Succeeded by John W. Taylor
Preceded by John Quincy Adams	United States Secretary of State; 1825–1829	Succeeded by Martin Van Buren
Party political offices
Preceded by James Monroe	Democratic-Republican nominee for President of the United States¹; 1824; Served alongside: John Quincy Adams, William Crawford, Andrew Jackson	Party abolished
Preceded by John Quincy Adams	National Republican nominee for President of the United States; 1832	Party abolished
Preceded by William Henry Harrison	Whig nominee for President of the United States; 1844	Succeeded by Zachary Taylor
Notes and references
1. The Democratic-Republican Party split in the 1824 election, fielding four separate candidates.
