= Olivia Stokes Hatch =

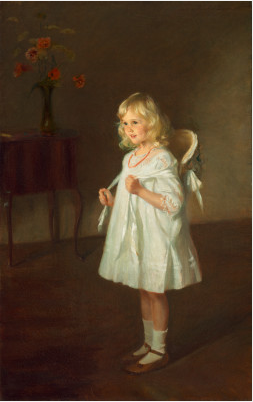
- A 1911 portrait titled "Olivia", painted by Lydia Field Emmet; identified as a portrait of Olivia Stokes Hatch, and donated to the National Gallery of Art by her.
- Born: Olivia Egleston Phelps Stokes; January 9, 1908; New Haven, Connecticut
- Died: October 17, 1983 (aged 75); Pittsfield, Massachusetts
- Occupations: Activist, volunteer, travel writer
- Spouse: John Davis Hatch Jr. (m. 1939)
- Children: 4
- Father: Anson Phelps Stokes Jr.

Olivia Stokes Hatch (January 9, 1908 – October 17, 1983) was an American philanthropist, clubwoman, and travel writer.

== Early life ==
Olivia Egleston Phelps Stokes was born in New Haven, Connecticut, the daughter of the educator and philanthropist Rev. Dr. Anson Phelps Stokes and Caroline Mitchell Phelps Stokes. She was a member of an extended family of notables: Her grandfather Anson Phelps Stokes was a banker, and her brother, Anson Phelps Stokes III was an Episcopal bishop. Her great-grandfather James Boulter Stokes and her great-great-grandfather, Anson Green Phelps were Connecticut businessmen. Her great-aunt was Caroline Phelps Stokes was also a wealthy benefactor, mainly of educational causes; real estate developer William Earl Dodge Stokes, socialist writer James Graham Phelps Stokes, and architect Isaac Newton Phelps Stokes were among her uncles. Her maternal great-grandfather was Daniel Lindley, an American missionary in South Africa, and her mother's sister, Anna V. S. Mitchell, did relief work in France during World War I and afterwards among refugees in Istanbul.

Olivia Stokes attended Foxcroft School and Bryn Mawr College, graduating in 1930.

== Career ==
Hatch traveled throughout the United States, Central, and South America, and in the Far East. She was co-author, with Mary Marvin Breckinridge Patterson, of Olivia's African Diary: Cape Town to Cairo, 1932, a record of their trip throughout Africa after college, which was published in 1980. Hatch died in 1983, aged 75 years. Her papers are in the collection of Bryn Mawr College.

Hatch was a member of the Colony Club in New York and of the Junior League in Washington, D.C. She was active with the American Red Cross and American Conferences of Social Work. In the 1940s, Hatch worked with the League of Women Voters, City Club (Albany), Race Relations group and the Red Cross Speakers Bureau. In the 1950s she worked with the Norfolk League of Women Voters, and was active in church groups and the Parent-Teacher Association. In Lenox, Massachusetts, in the 1960s, she volunteered as a reader for Recording for the Blind, and helped to entertain young artists in conjunction with the Berkshire Music Center. She and her husband donated significant lands toward the creation of the Berkshire County Land Trust and Conservation Fund.

== Personal life and legacy ==
Olivia Phelps Stokes married John Davis Hatch Jr. (1907–1996), an art collector and museum administrator, in 1939. They had four children together, Sarah, John, Daniel, and James. John, Daniel, and Sarah all followed their mother's interest in Africa, and Sarah Stokes Hatch continued her work with the American Red Cross.

Olivia Stokes Hatch died in 1983, aged 75 years. There is a site called "Olivia's Overlook" in the Berkshire Hills, named for Olivia Stokes Hatch.
