= Olivia Phelps Stokes =

American writer and benefactor

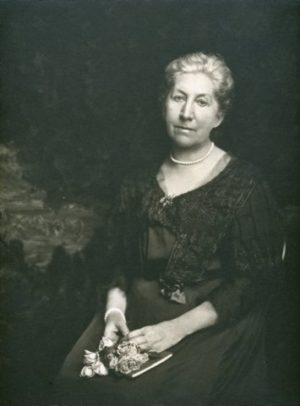
- Born: Olivia Egleston Phelps Stokes; January 11, 1847; New York City, New York, U.S.
- Died: December 14, 1927 (aged 80); Washington, D.C., U.S.
- Parent(s): James Boulter Stokes; Caroline Phelps Stokes
- Relatives: Caroline Phelps Stokes (sister); Anson Phelps Stokes (brother); William Earl Dodge Stokes (brother); Anson Greene Phelps (grandfather); Edward Stiles Stokes (cousin); Grace Hoadley Dodge (cousin); Isaac Phelps Stokes (nephew)

Olivia Egleston Phelps Stokes (January 11, 1847 – December 14, 1927) was an American writer and benefactor to many organisations that helped the underprivileged in the United States including supporting churches, libraries, educational establishments, orphanages, housing and more.

== Early life ==
Olivia was born at the country estate of her grandfather along the East River in New York City (near what is now 31st Street) on January 11, 1847. She was the second daughter ten children born to Caroline (née Phelps) Stokes (1812–1881) and her father James Boulter Stokes (1804–1881), a partner in the mercantile business of Phelps, Dodge & Co. Among her siblings was banker Anson Phelps Stokes, real estate developer William Earl Dodge Stokes, and fellow philanthropist Caroline Phelps Stokes. She grew up at her parents house on the East River until they moved with her family to 37 Madison Avenue. The family was raised Presbyterian, but Olivia joined the Episcopal Church later in her life.

Her maternal grandfather was Anson Greene Phelps, was a New York merchant and the namesake of Ansonia, Connecticut, who was descended from an old Massachusetts family. Through her mother, she was a descendant of three colonial governors, Thomas Dudley of Massachusetts, John Haynes and George Wyllys of Connecticut. Among her large, and prominent, family members were uncle U.S. Representative William E. Dodge, and cousins, Edward Stiles Stokes and Grace Hoadley Dodge.

== Philanthropy ==
Olivia's parents died within months of each other in 1881, leaving an estate worth several million dollars to their seven children. However, the will was contested by her sister Dora, and, therefore, the money was not distributed until 1888. Olivia retained the family home at 37 Madison Avenue lived there with her younger sister, Caroline, until the building was redeveloped in 1902.

Together, with her sister Caroline, Olivia worked together on many charitable projects such as the St. Paul's Chapel at Columbia University, Woodbridge Hall at Yale (part of the Hewitt Quadrangle), and the Haynes Memorial Gates at Hartford First Church Cemetery. Several of the buildings they funded were designed by their nephew, Isaac Newton Phelps Stokes, who was a partner in the architectural firm of Howells & Stokes.

At the Tuskegee Institute, founded by Booker T. Washington, they funded bathhouses, a chapel, the Dorothy Hall training building, and entrance gates, working with architect Robert Robinson Taylor. The institute provided vocational training and many of the buildings were constructed by the students. Other works supported by the sisters for African American students were at Hampton Institute in Virginia (today Hampton University), the Calhoun School in Alabama, and Berea College in Kentucky.

After her sister's death in 1909, Olivia continued their charitable works and acted as a trustee of the Phelps Stokes Fund that focused on providing housing and education for African Americans, Native Americans and needy and deserving white students.

In 1915, Olivia had two model tenements built in New York City. She also wrote several books, including Pine and Cedar: Bible Verses (1885), Forward in the Better Life (1915), Saturday Night Thoughts in Lent (1922), and Letters and Memories of Susan and Anna Bartlett Warner (1925).

== Social ranking ==
In 1892, Stokes was included in Ward McAllister's "Four Hundred", purported to be an index of New York's best families, published in The New York Times. Conveniently, 400 was the number of people that could fit into Mrs. Astor's ballroom. In 1914, she bought a mansion in the Berkshires of Lenox, Massachusetts, called Underledge.

== Personal life ==
Olivia, like her sister Caroline, never married. Her brother, Anson, named his daughter, Olivia Stokes Hatch (née Olivia Egleston Phelps Stokes), after Olivia.

Olivia died of bronchial pneumonia in Washington, D.C., on December 14, 1927. After a funeral at St. Paul's Chapel at Columbia, she was buried at Woodlawn Cemetery. Her estate, valued in excess of $3,000,000 was left to charity, with the residuary estate going to Barnard College.

== Published works ==
- Pine and Cedar: Bible Verses by Stokes, T. Whittaker, 1885.
- Saturday Night Thoughts in Lent by Stokes, The Jordan & More Press, 1922.
