= Isaac Phelps =

Isaac Phelps may refer to:

- Isaac Phelps (politician) (1783–1861), American politician and judge
- Isaac Newton Phelps (1802–1888), American merchant and banker
- Isaac Phelps (racing driver) (born 2009), British racing driver

== See also ==
- Isaac Newton Phelps Stokes (1867–1944), American architect
