= Royal Insurance Building =

Royal Insurance Building may refer to:

- Royal Insurance Building, Liverpool
- Royal Insurance Building, San Francisco
