= Anna V. S. Mitchell =

American Red Cross worker

Anna Mitchell

Anna V. S. Mitchell (1878–1966) was an American Red Cross worker in France during World War I, and afterwards among Russian refugees in Istanbul.

== Early life ==
Anna Van Schaick Mitchell was the daughter of Clarence Green Mitchell, an attorney, and Sarah Adams Lindley Mitchell. Her sister Lucy Lindley Mitchell married John Charles Molteno, Jr., a businessman and legislator in South Africa. Her sister Caroline Green Mitchell Stokes was married to Anson Phelps Stokes, and was the mother of Olivia Stokes Hatch and Anson Phelps Stokes, Jr. Their grandfather Daniel Lindley was an American missionary in South Africa and founder of the Inanda Seminary School; their great-grandfather Jacob Lindley was first president of Ohio University.

== Career ==
As a young woman, Anna V. Mitchell was known as an "accomplished pianist" and "active in settlement work in New York and London."

During World War I Anna Mitchell went to France and Belgium with the American Red Cross. In 1916, she was at Monastir, working with Serbian refugees. She founded a canteen at Châlons-sur-Marne with Margery Nott. Her niece Mildred Mitchell and volunteer Margaret Hall worked with them. She was also involved with post-war relief work in Calais. She received a Croix de Guerre from the French government for her wartime work.

In the 1920s, she worked in Istanbul with Russian refugees, and as executive secretary to Admiral Mark Lambert Bristol. Her correspondence with notable family connections helped with fundraising, but she also arranged for refugees to sell their handicrafts on passenger ships in the Black Sea. In 1929, she and Alma Ruggles took leave to give lectures in the United States to raise awareness and funds for their continuing refugee work in Turkey. Again during this effort, she used her family connections to create events such as a "program of Russian and gypsy songs and dances" at a Junior League meeting in New York City, cohosted by her sister and her sister-in-law, to raise funds for the Russian Refugee Children's Welfare Society.

Anna Mitchell lived in Boston in the 1940s.

== Personal life ==
Anna V. S. Mitchell died in 1966, aged 88 years. One collection of her papers is held in the Hoover Institution Archives. Other papers of Mitchell's, including diaries from the period 1896 through 1925, are in the Olivia Stokes Hatch Papers at Bryn Mawr College Library.
