= Ilyás =

Short story by Leo Tolstoy

- Short story by Leo Tolstoy
- Original title: Ильяс
- Language: Russian

Publication
- Publication date: 1885
- Publication place: Russia

"Ilyás" ("Ильяс", 1885, sometimes translated as "Elias") is a short story by Leo Tolstoy written in 1885. It is the story of the farmer, Ilyas, who grew up successful but loses his fortune through mistake, in the end only finding peace without having property.

== Plot ==
According to the literary critic Ernest Joseph Simmons, "Elias" is a story that combines feelings universal to all men with plots and trappings of a supernatural or otherworldly character. Elsewhere, Simmons said that this was one of the wrote as an illustrative text alongside pictures. According to lyricist Robert Hunter, the moral of this story is that one should serve one's master with honesty and humility, no matter how oppressive one's master is.

== History ==
It was translated to English in 1899 by Nathan Haskell Dole and in 1904 by Leo Wiener.

The story is regularly included in academic, literary material for university-level students.

== See also ==
- Bibliography of Leo Tolstoy
- Twenty-Three Tales
