= Chicago Relief and Aid Society =

American charitable organization

The Chicago Relief and Aid Society was one of several charitable organizations created in Chicago in the latter part of the 19th century to provide aid and support to people and families living in poverty. Founders of the organization modeled it after the Association for Improving the Condition of the Poor in New York.

== Early years ==
The Chicago Relief and Aid Society was a philanthropic charitable organization formed in Chicago in 1851. With its incorporation, the Society was charged with administering private charity in the City of Chicago and was authorized to receive appropriations from the city, In addition to providing fuel, food, and other necessities the Society worked to find employment for those it helped. Though it was one of many relief and charitable organizations in Chicago during the mid-19th century, the Chicago Relief and Aid Society came to prominence when Mayor Roswell B. Mason appointed the Society as the primary relief organization for the city in the aftermath of the Great Chicago Fire.

== The Great Chicago Fire ==
In weeks and months following the Fire, the Society provided a great deal of aid to the city's residents. The Society raised over $5 million from sources around the world to provide food, clothing, water, and fuel. Additionally 5,000 sewing machines were provided to women so they could make clothes for their families. Medical care was also a high priority and most notably, over 60,000 people were vaccinated against smallpox.

== Post Fire ==
The fundraising efforts of the Society were so successful that when the official relief efforts stopped, the Society had a surplus of $600,000 in unspent funds. These funds supported Society programs for several years after the Fire. During the Panic of 1893 and its aftermath, the Chicago Relief and Aid Society came under criticism for its efforts to help the poor. It was the contention of the Society that poverty was a moral issue rather than an economic or social problem and as a result, a competing organization, the Central Relief Association, was formed as an alternative for helping those living in poverty in Chicago. The Central Relief Association was later renamed the Chicago Bureau of Charities, and the two organizations merged in 1909 to form the United Charities of Chicago.
