= Robert Hunter (author) =

American sociologist, author and golf course architect

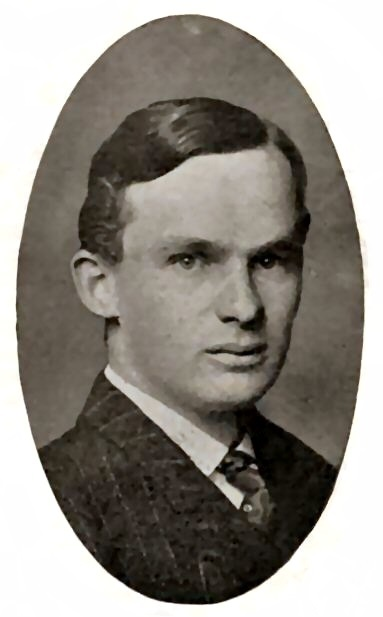
- Born: Wiles Robert Hunter; April 10, 1874; Terre Haute, Indiana, United States
- Died: May 14, 1942 (aged 68); Montecito, California, United States
- Education: Indiana University
- Occupations: Sociologist, progressive author, golf course architect
- Spouse: Caroline M. Phelps Stokes

Robert Hunter (né Wiles Robert Hunter; April 10, 1874 – May 14, 1942) was an American sociologist, progressive author, and golf course architect.

== Biography ==
=== Early life and family ===
Wiles Robert Hunter was born on April 10, 1874, at Terre Haute, Indiana the middle of five children born over thirteen years to William Robert and Caroline "Callie" (née Fouts) Hunter. Hunter's father was a native of Tennessee and a veteran of the American Civil War, having served as a colonel with the Illinois 21st Infantry. At war's end William Hunter relocated to Terre Haute where he married and became a manufacturer of horse-drawn carriages and buggies in partnership with his father-in-law, Andrew B. Fouts. Robert Hunter's maternal second great-grandfather was Samuel Hawkins, an American Revolutionary War veteran who had served with General George Rogers Clark at the Battle of Vincennes.

During the 1884 presidential race New York Governor Grover Cleveland made a campaign stop at Terre Haute, where William Hunter had been put in charge of the local reception committee. As a result, his ten-year-old son was given the honor of shaking the candidate's hand after riding a white pony at the head of a parade greeting the Democratic nominee to their city.

=== Early career ===
Robert Hunter graduated from Indiana University in 1896 where he also played football, and soon thereafter became an organizing secretary for the Chicago Bureau of Charities. Around this time he became involved with the Settlement Movement. For a while, he was a resident of the city's Hull House, before traveling to England, where he would join similar socioeconomic communes. In 1902 he was named head worker (manager) of the University Settlement in New York City, where he also became active in an anti-tuberculosis campaign and chaired a New York commission tasked with ending child labor.

=== Marriage and family ===
On May 23, 1903, at St. Luke's Episcopal Church in Darien, Connecticut, Robert Hunter married Caroline Margharetta Phelps Stokes, the daughter of New York banker Anson Phelps Stokes. He may have met her the year before when they both served on the New York Commission investigating child labor. The couple became parents to two sons and two daughters, Robert, Phelps, Caroline and Helen.

Caroline had four brothers who went on to have noted careers: Isaac Newton Phelps Stokes, an architect and onetime chairman of the New York Municipal Art Commission; James Graham Phelps Stokes, publicist and political activist; Anson Phelps Stokes Jr., clergyman and educator who served as secretary for Yale University; and Harold Phelps Stokes, newspaper correspondent, editorial writer at The New York Times and father-in-law of Nicholas Katzenbach, President Lyndon B. Johnson's Attorney General. Caroline herself became a noted conservationist.

=== Politics ===
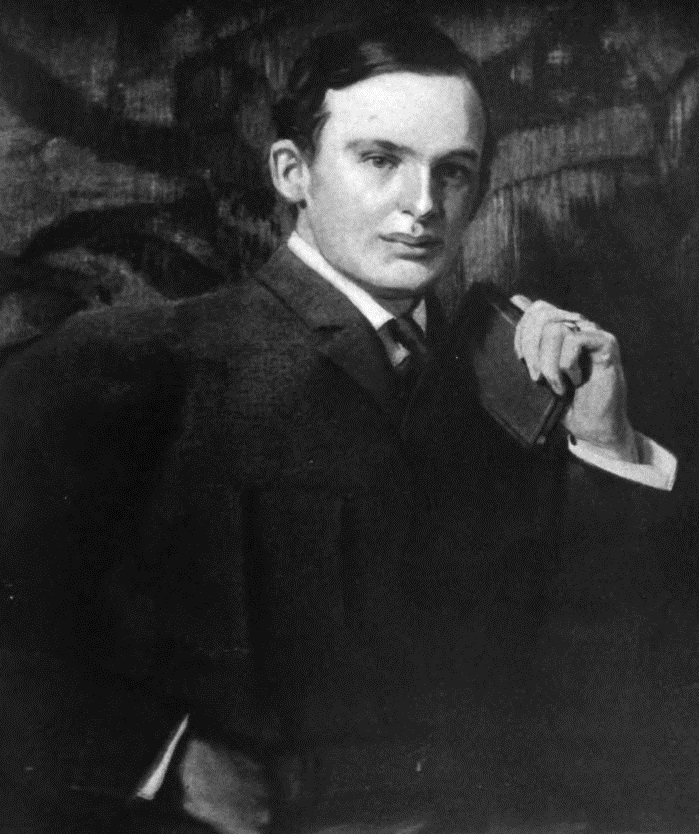
Portrait of Robert Hunter, by Sergeant Kendall

Hunter's politics were largely affected by the grinding poverty he witnessed during the deep economic depression that hit America in the mid-1890s, juxtaposed to the wealth and privilege of his own family. His time in Chicago had brought him in close contact with a number of social reformers such as Jane Addams, Mary McDowell, Ellen Gates Starr, Edith Abbott, Sophonisba Breckinridge, Florence Kelley, Julia Lathrop, Alice Hamilton, Grace Abbott and later in England, Scottish labor leader and socialist Keir Hardie and Russian anarchist Piotr Kropotkin.

In 1905 Hunter joined the Socialist Party of America along with his wife, his brother-in-law, James Stokes, and his sister-in-law, Rose Pastor Stokes, On September 12 of that year he was named to the executive committee of the newly established Intercollegiate Socialist Society in New York. The goal of the organization was to promote discussion of socialist ideals in colleges and universities; it had for its first president writer Jack London and vice president Upton Sinclair. Hunter ran for political office twice on the Socialist ticket, first for Governor of Connecticut in 1910 and then in Connecticut's 4th congressional district in 1912; both campaigns ended in defeat.

After the outbreak of the First World War a rift in the socialist movement led to Hunter's resignation, along with those of a number of other high-profile members, including London and Sinclair. Years later, Hunter would support Republican Wendell Willkie over President Franklin D. Roosevelt during the 1940 presidential campaign.

=== Golf course design work, writing ===
He was an avid amateur golfer, and in 1922 won the Gold Vase Tournament at Pebble Beach Golf Links. Although there was little evidence of a formal partnership, Hunter teamed with famous golf course architect Alister MacKenzie to design and build several northern California golf courses, including the Union League Golf and Country Club of San Francisco (now Green Hills Country Club). He later moved to Pebble Beach, California, where in 1926 he authored what was one of the first comprehensive books on golf course architecture: "The Links". He also was involved with MacKenzie during the design of Cypress Point (1928), and improvements to the Pebble Beach course that same year, in advance of the United States Amateur Championship (golf), which was held there the following year.

Hunter also had a part in the (re)design of other California courses, including the Valley Club of Montecito, Meadow Club, Berkeley Country Club, Northwood Golf Club, and Pittsburgh Golf Club. Hunter proved prophetic when he forecasted the eventual massive increase in golf's popularity, as recreation for all classes and ages of people; this came to fruition in gradual steps following World War II.

=== Professor, later life, death ===
He moved to the West Coast in 1918, and lectured in politics and economics at the University of California, Berkeley. Robert Hunter died of a heart attack at his home in Montecito, California, an unincorporated community in Santa Barbara, on May 14, 1942. He was survived by his wife and three of their children.

Caroline Hunter was an active member of the Save the Redwoods League and had worked to preserve the park areas at Point Lobos in Monterey, California. She died in San Francisco on July 6, 1964, at the age of eighty-six.

== Works ==
- Tenement Conditions in Chicago: Report by the Investigating Committee of the City Homes Association. Chicago : City Homes Association, 1901.
- Socialists at Work. New York: Macmillan, 1908.
- The Crisis: The Unions and the Courts, the Tyranny of Injunctions, the Power of Unity. Chicago: Samuel A. Bloch, 1909.
- Poverty. New York: Macmillan, 1912.
- The "Gunmen" of Industry. Chicago: Socialist Party, 1914.
- Violence and the Labor Movement. New York: Macmillan, 1914.
- Labor in Politics. Chicago: Socialist Party, 1915.
- Why We Fail as Christians. New York: Macmillan, 1919.
- The Links New York: Charles Scribner's Sons, 1926.
- Revolution: Why, How, When? New York: Harper & Brothers, 1940.
