= Connecticut Yankee Council =

Scouting organization in Connecticut, US

- Owner: Scouting America
- Headquarters: Milford, Connecticut
- Country: United States
- Founded: 1998
- Website www.ctyankee.org

The Connecticut Yankee Council of Scouting America is located in Milford, Connecticut. It is council #072 and serves 37 towns and cities in Connecticut, including Fairfield, New Haven, and parts of Hartford counties. The present council was formed in 1998 by the merger of Quinnipiac Council (#074) and Fairfield County Council (#068).Owaneco Lodge is the Order of the Arrow lodge that serves this council.

== History ==
In 1998, the council was formed by the merger of Quinnipiac Council and Fairfield County Council.

== Organization ==
Connecticut Yankee Council is divided into the following districts:

- Pomperaug District serves Westport, Weston, Easton, Fairfield, Monroe, Trumbull, Bridgeport and Stratford.
- Powahay District serves Stamford, New Canaan, Darien, Wilton and Norwalk.
- Quinnipiac District serves New Haven, East Haven, West Haven, North Haven, Branford, North Branford, Guilford, Madison, Southington, Meriden, Wallingford, Hamden, Bethany, Woodbridge, Orange and Milford.
- Scatacook District serves Sherman, New Fairfield, Brookfield, Danbury, Bethel, Newtown, Ridgefield and Redding.

== Camps ==
Connecticut Yankee Council operates two camps: Camp Sequassen in New Hartford, Hoyt Scout Reservation in Redding

=== Camp Sequassen ===
Camp Sequassen is located in New Hartford, Connecticut. It is a Scouting camp operated by the Connecticut Yankee Council and is mainly used for summer camp. During the summer, it becomes a Scouts BSA resident camp for over 2,000 youth from across New England. The camp was moved to this new site in 1927 with the purchase of 125 acres. Today the camp consists of over 600 acres of forest and over 2500' of shoreline on West Hill Pond. Troops from around Connecticut and neighboring states stay at Camp Sequassen for a week. While staying there, Scouts are able to work on rank requirements and take merit badge classes while being instructed by well-trained staff members.

One of these places is the Trading Post. This is a small Scouting store operated by Sequassen staff. It is well known for the slushies and candy sold there, but also offers other merchandise such as Sequassen frisbees, shirts, hats, belts, walking sticks, joke books, cookbooks, songbooks, knives, playing cards, bumper stickers, mugs, water bottles, carabiners, and patches as well as official socks. At the waterfront, Scouts can go swimming or take boats such as canoes, kayaks, sailboats, and rowboats out into West Hill Pond. Also, Platt Field, located in North Sequassen, is where Scouts can participate in rifle shooting, and archery (including trap, clout and regular). Very close to Platt Field, shotgun shooting is available for older Scouts near Scout Craft. There is also a handicrafts center near the waterfront where woodcarving, photography and metalwork are possible. At the Nature Center called "Eco" (located on the right side of Cohen Lodge), Scouts can enjoy creative, fun, and educational programs such as catching insects at the "Bug Wall," testing their knowledge in "Eco Jeopardy", and going on an astronomy hike up to Platt Field. Scouts can also play exciting games such as gaga ball, ultimate frisbee, volleyball, lawn games, and disc golf in the nearby Clark Field. At the end of the week all Scouts can participate in the camp-wide "Land and Sea Games."

No one is allowed to cross over West Hill Road to get from one half of the camp to the other. Instead, all Scouts, staff and adult leaders use the Godfrey-Morris tunnel that goes under West Hill Road.

=== John Sherman Hoyt Scout Reservation and Training Center ===
John Sherman Hoyt Scout Reservation and Training Center is located in Redding, Connecticut. The reservation was donated to the Alfred W. Dater Council by Alice B. Sanford in 1966. The 174 acres (0.70 km^{2}) of wooded property is located in a rural area of Connecticut on the western end of the Connecticut Yankee Council. The camp consists of 173 acres. When the Hoyt training center is mentioned in the presence of Connecticut Yankee Council members, it is often repeated by members of the audience who reply, "HOYT!"

The reservation is named after John Sherman Hoyt of Darien, Connecticut. Hoyt was a wealthy industrialist and dedicated Scouter. Hoyt was involved with the Scouting movement since 1910 as one of its founders and later served as National Council Vice President for Finance, a member of the National Council Executive Board and Advisory Board. Hoyt donated 18 acres (73,000 m^{2}) of land in 1947 to the Alfred W. Dater Council, which became the Five Mile River Camp. The first building built at the new camp was a training cabin, which was dedicated to Major General Arthur Carter.

The reservation has been operated by three different councils. Alfred W. Dater Council merged to form Fairfield County Council in 1972 and merged again in 1998 to form the present Connecticut Yankee Council.

=== Camp Pomperaug ===
This is a Scout camp located in Union, Connecticut. The CT Burn Foundation uses the facility as a summer camp for children with severe burns. This camp has had a long history, first, as Boy Scout camp located on Lake Zoar as part of the Housatonic River system.

=== Wah Wah Taysee ===
Wah Wah Taysee is located partly in North Haven and partly in Hamden. The land was donated to the Quinnipiac Council in 1971 by the late Ned Greist. According to the attorney who drafted the deed, Mr. Greist chose the name 'Wah Wah Taysee' for the campsite, which he said was the name of the firefly in the poem Hiawatha. The property is situated near the base of Sleeping Giant, a.k.a. Mt. Carmel. Mr. Greist's family was one of several families instrumental in earlier successful efforts to save the area from aggressive quarrying, and devoting it to what is now the Sleeping Giant Park. Mr. Greist was an avid hiker and an active volunteer in the Scout movement. He was also the President of the Sleeping Giant Park Association for several years. Camp Wah Wah Taysee was bought by from the Boys Scouts of CT by the North Haven Land Trust.

== Order of the Arrow ==
Owaneco Lodge
- Founded: 1998

Owaneco Lodge is the Order of the Arrow (OA) lodge for the Connecticut Yankee Council. The Order of the Arrow is Scouting's National Honor Society. The lodge's name comes from a chief’s name of the Mohegan Tribe and its totem is Owaneco.

The council was formed in 1998 by the merger of the Quinnipiac Council, which hosted the Arcoon Lodge; and the Fairfield County Council, which hosted the Tankiteke Lodge. In 1998 it was announced that Arcoon and Tankiteke would merge to form a new lodge in 1999. A steering committee was set up to discuss the merger between the two lodges, and five meetings were held between February and September 1998 to discuss and finalize the name, structure, committee responsibilities, and bylaws of the new lodge.

At the first meeting of the new lodge on October 4, 1998, the members approved the lodge name, number, and bylaws, and elected the first group of lodge officers. During the lodge’s first year, the executive committee worked to mold the new lodge program. Several changes were made to combine the traditions of Tankiteke and Arcoon and adapt a new lodge program. In 1998 the Ockenuck Chapter renamed itself to the Arcoon Chapter.

During 1999, Owaneco lodge achieved honor lodge status for the first time in its short history. Owaneco repeated this achievement in 2007. The 2003 Section NE-2A Conclave was held at Camp Sequassen and hosted by Owaneco Lodge. The Quinnipiac Dancers, which started out as the Wulihan Chapter Dance Team in the Arcoon Lodge, celebrated their 40th anniversary in 2014. The dance team has garnered dozens of awards.

Owaneco Lodge actively practices the OA principles of Cheerful Service. For many years, the lodge is engaged in collecting soda can tabs for donation to the Masonic Tabs for Tots program, which uses the tabs to raise funds for the Shriner Hospitals for Crippled Children and Burn Victims. In 2011, Owaneco donated close to 100 pounds of tabs to the Connecticut Masonic Scouters Association.

== See also ==
- Scouting in Connecticut
