= Anson Phelps Stokes Jr. =

American author

- Portrait of Stokes by Julius Rolshoven, c. 1900
- Born: April 13, 1874; New Brighton, Staten Island, New York
- Died: August 13, 1958 (aged 84); Lenox, Massachusetts
- Education: Yale University; Episcopal Theological School
- Spouse: Caroline Mitchell (after 1903)
- Children: Anson Phelps Stokes III; Isaac Newton Phelps Stokes II; Olivia Stokes Hatch
- Parent(s): Anson Phelps Stokes; Helen Louise Phelps
- Relatives: James Graham Phelps Stokes (brother); Isaac Newton Phelps Stokes (brother); James Boulter Stokes (paternal grandfather); Caroline Phelps Stokes (paternal aunt); Olivia Egleston Phelps Stokes (paternal aunt); William Earle Dodge Stokes (paternal uncle); Edward Stiles Stokes (first cousin once removed)

Anson Phelps Stokes Jr. (April 13, 1874 – August 13, 1958) was an American educator, historian, clergyman, author, philanthropist and civil rights activist.

== Early life ==
Stokes was born in New Brighton on Staten Island, New York, to Anson Phelps Stokes and Helen Louisa (née Phelps) Stokes. He shared his name with his father, the prominent banker, and his son, Anson Phelps Stokes III, an Episcopal bishop.

He attended Yale University, graduating in 1896 with a bachelor's degree. At Yale he was inducted into Skull and Bones. He then traveled, mostly in East Asia. In 1897, he entered the Episcopal Theological School in Cambridge, Massachusetts, to prepare for the priesthood, and received his bachelor of divinity degree in 1900, although it was not until 1925 that he formally became a priest.

== Career ==
In 1899, Stokes took the post of Secretary of Yale University, second in command to the university's president, and he also served as assistant rector of Saint Paul's Episcopal Church in New Haven, Connecticut, from 1900 to 1918. Stokes was a favorite to replace Arthur T. Hadley as president of Yale in 1921, and was said to have had the support of a majority of the Yale Corporation, but a vociferous minority insisted that an outsider was needed at the helm of the university, and Stokes was passed over for James Rowland Angell.

From 1924 to 1939, Stokes was resident canon at the National Cathedral in Washington, D.C. During this time, he became involved in many social, cultural, and ecclesiastical causes, and guided the philanthropy of the Phelps Stokes Fund (established in 1911) to improve the lives of African and American blacks. In 1936, he published a short biography of Booker T. Washington, which was an expanded version of a sketch he had written for the Dictionary of American Biography.

Stokes saw all of his work as "fellowship in the gospel" (Philemon 1:5).

== Personal life ==
In December 1903, Stokes married Caroline Mitchell. They had three children, all born in New Haven, Connecticut:

- Anson Phelps Stokes III (1905–1986), who was ordained as an Episcopal priest in 1933.
- Isaac Newton Phelps Stokes II (1906–1998), who married Barbara Hoyt, a descendant of Chief Justice Salmon P. Chase, in 1940; after her death he married Katrina (née Roelker) Huntington (the former wife of William R. Huntington) in 1967.
- Olivia Phelps Stokes (1908–1983), who married art collector and museum administrator John Davis Hatch Jr. in 1939.

He died after a lengthy illness in his Lenox, Massachusetts, home.

== Works ==
Stokes wrote these works:

- Memorials of Eminent Yale Men, 2 vols. New Haven, Yale University Press, 1914.
- Tuskegee Institute — The First Fifty Years, 1931.
- Art and the Color Line: An Appeal made May 31, 1939, to the President General and Other Officers of the Daughters of the American Revolution to Modify the Rules so as to Permit Distinguished Negro Artists such as Marian Anderson to be Heard in Constitution Hall, Washington, 1939.
- "Introduction" to Encyclopedia of the Negro; preparatory volume with reference lists and reports, by W. E. B. Du Bois and Guy B. Johnson, prepared with the cooperation of E. Irene Diggs, Agnes C. L. Donohugh, Guion Johnson, et al. New York: The Phelps-Stokes Fund, Inc., 1946.
- Contributor, Negro Status and Race Relations in the United States, 1911-1946; the Thirty-Five Year Report of the Phelps-Stokes Fund, New York: Phelps-Stokes Fund, 1948.
- Church and State in the United States, three volumes, 1950.
