= Postcrypt Coffeehouse =

Music venue in New York City, US

Coordinates: 40.80780°N 73.96094°W

- The official logo of Postcrypt Coffeehouse, designed by Ginia Sweeney.
- Interactive map of Postcrypt Coffeehouse
- Location: St. Paul's Chapel, Columbia University, New York
- Capacity: 35
- Events: Acoustic, Folk

Construction
- Opened: 1964

Website
- www.postcrypt.org

Postcrypt Coffeehouse is an all-acoustic music venue in the basement of St. Paul's Chapel at Columbia University in New York City, run completely by students. Founded in 1964, Postcrypt has hosted many up-and-coming folk musicians, including Jeff Buckley, Dar Williams, Shawn Colvin, David Bromberg, and Ani DiFranco. Additionally, Suzanne Vega, a graduate of Barnard College, returns to Postcrypt each Spring to play one secret concert. The young folk singer Anthony da Costa performs there regularly, and Mary Lee Kortes, of the band Mary Lee's Corvette, has played there along with her husband, the guitarist and producer Eric Ambel.

Postcrypt is one of the few free, all volunteer-run venues in New York. Its size is also notable: according to the fire code, it can legally only host 35 people at a time, giving the venue a very intimate feel, and making it possible to have music without any sort of amplification. The AIA Guide to New York City describes the Postcrypt Coffeehouse as "the most haunting performance space in the City", and "a great place to find yourself during a blackout".

== History ==
The venue was established in 1964 with the help of the campus chaplain, Reverend John D. Cannon. Cannon and student Dotty Sutherland (with assistance from Union Theological Seminary students interning at the time, Beryl Ramsay and Betsy Gwynn), cleaned and redecorated a small storage room in the basement of the chapel, transforming it into Postcrypt.

Despite popular conceptions, the Postcrypt location was never a "crypt," but rather a storage closet in the basement of the chapel; it takes its name from the Søren Kierkegaard book, Concluding Unscientific Postscript to Philosophical Fragments. This was then shortened to C.U. (the initials for Columbia University) Postcrypt to reflect the fact that the venue was in the basement of the chapel.

Since its creation, Postcrypt Coffeehouse has been completely run by student volunteers. It is open each Friday and Saturday night during the academic year from 8:30 pm– 11:30pm, featuring three artists who each play a 45-50 minute set. It is always free and open to the public. Postcrypt is supported by funding from the student government and their sales of coffee, baked goods, and a selection of beer. In a 2006 article about Morningside Heights, The New York Times wrote:

One thing you won't find anywhere else is the Postcrypt Coffeehouse, a musty hideaway tucked into the depths of the St. Paul's basement where singers from the accomplished to the totally disastrous perform Friday and Saturday nights. The tiny spot serves $1 coffee so awful they should refund your dollar if you finish it, but makes up for it with free popcorn.

Since that article, the staff of Postcrypt has tried to improve the quality of their coffee, using fair trade and organic coffee as part of the effort to go green. This effort has also included the institution of a "Bring Your Own Mug" policy: coffee and locally produced cider is offered at a 50% discount to patrons who bring their own mugs.

== Troubles with the University ==
Postcrypt has faced its share of trouble with Columbia's administration: in 2001, it was nearly shut down because of fire code violations. Later, source of the low lighting has changed from candles to electric lights.

== Folk Festival ==
On May 4, 2008, Postcrypt Coffeehouse hosted their first annual Folk Festival, an all-day event on Columbia's campus. All acts featured were completely by Columbia students. The second annual Folk Festival took place on April 26, 2009, and was cosponsored by the environmental group "Greenspiration," as the culmination of a week of environmentally themed events. It featured a mix of both student and professional performers, including da Costa, The Salvation Band, Chuck E Costa, and the Columbia based band The Kitchen Cabinet. Postcrypt received a grant from the Gatsby Charitable Foundation to partially fund the event.
