= St. Paul's Chapel (Columbia University) =

Chapel in Manhattan, New York

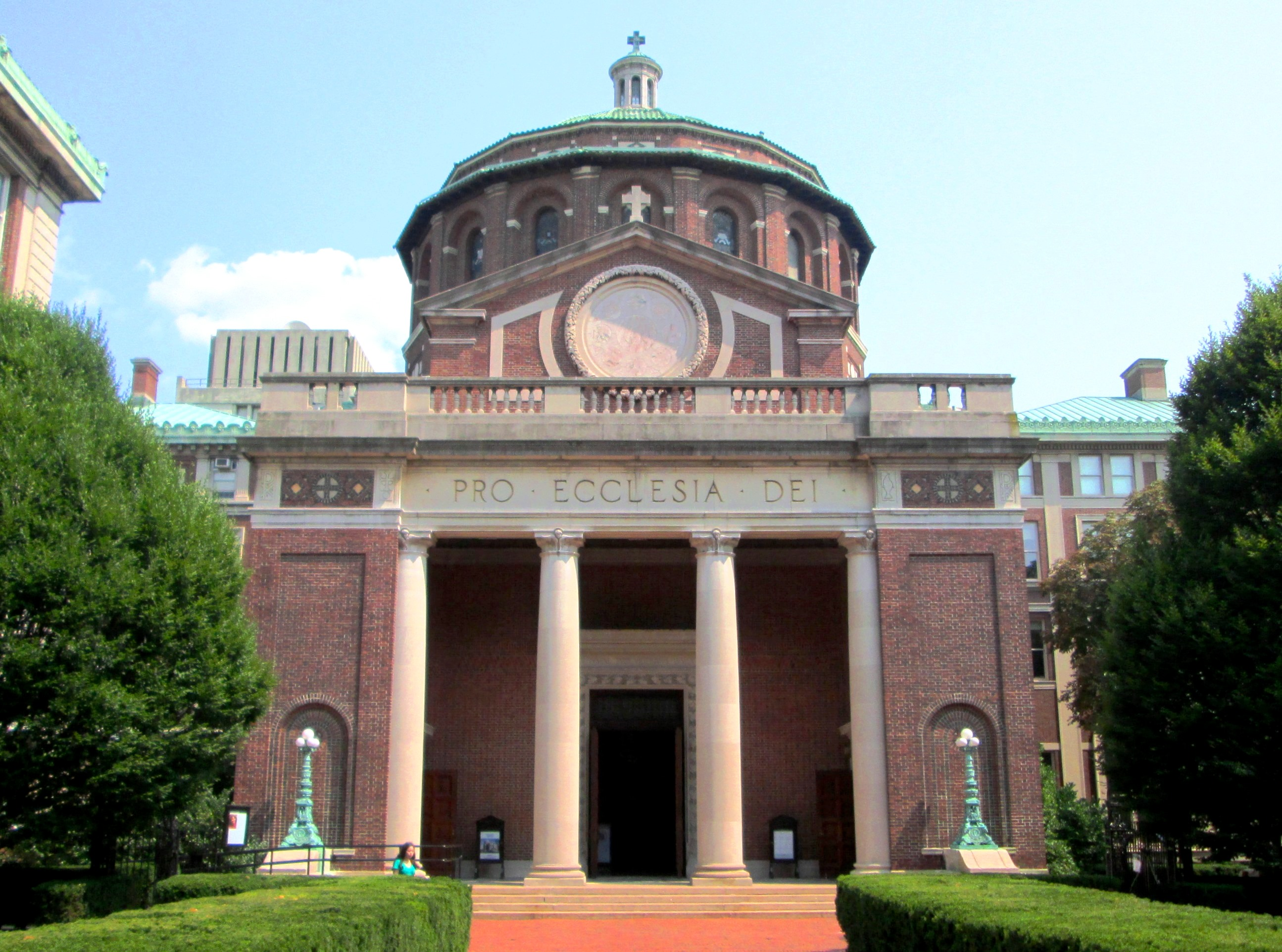
- St. Paul's Chapel in 2014
- Interactive map of the St. Paul's Chapel area

General information
- Architectural style: Byzantine, Renaissance Revival
- Location: Columbia University, New York City, New York
- Coordinates: 40°48′28.2″N 73°57′39.4″W
- Construction started: 1904
- Completed: 1907

Design and construction
- Architect: I. N. Phelps Stokes
- Architecture firm: Howells & Stokes

New York State Register of Historic Places
- Designated: June 9, 1978
- Reference no.: 06101.000082

New York City Landmark
- Designated: September 20, 1966
- Reference no.: 0305

St. Paul's Chapel, on the Morningside Heights campus of Columbia University in Manhattan, New York City, is an Episcopal church built in 1903–07 and designed by I. N. Phelps Stokes, of the firm of Howells & Stokes. The exterior is in the Northern Italian Renaissance Revival style while the interior is Byzantine.

Although the chapel was part of their master plan, it was the first building on the campus that was not designed by McKim, Mead & White. The chapel was the gift of Olivia Egleston Phelps Stokes and Caroline Phelps Stokes, the sisters of philanthropist Anson Phelps Stokes, in memory of their parents. Attached to their donation was the requirement that their nephew, I. N. Phelps Stokes, the author of The Iconography of Manhattan Island, design the building.

== Description ==
=== Exterior ===
The chapel's exterior of red brick with limestone trim—with terra cotta and bronze ornamentation—fits in with the original McKim, Mead buildings on the campus. The building's dome is covered with green glazed Ludowici clay roof tiles and stands 91 feet (28 m) above the ground. Some believe the structure is the earliest example of a self-supporting dome in an American church.

The 24 windows around the drum of the dome carry the names of prominent New York families connected with the university, such as Philip Van Cortlandt, DeWitt Clinton and William C. Rhinelander. The entablature on the chapel's front facade is PRO ECCLESIA DEI, meaning "For the Church of God". The wrought-iron gates in front were originally used by the North Reformed Dutch Church, which was located at Fulton and William streets in Manhattan and closed in 1875.

=== Interior ===
The chapel's Byzantine interior features Guastavino tile vaulting in intricate patterns on almost every curved surface. Three stained glass windows by John La Farge adorn the apse; other windows are by D. Maitland Armstrong, Henry Wynd Young, and J. Gordon Guthrie. The chapel contains an "Altar for Peace" by George Nakashima, a wooden table with natural edges in his signature style.

The chapel has "sonorous" acoustics, which makes it an excellent venue for the long-running concert series "Music at St. Paul's", and its Aeolian-Skinner pipe organ is renowned for its fine tone.

St. Paul's is referred to as "Columbia's most spectacular building" in the Eyewitness Guide to New York and as "the best of all Columbia's buildings" by the AIA Guide to New York City. It was designated a New York City Landmark on September 20, 1966.

== Uses ==
Many religious groups use the chapel throughout the week for their meetings; it hosts over 600 religious services each year for a variety of faiths. Several non-religious student groups also use the chapel. The most notable of these are the student magazine The Blue and White and the Postcrypt Coffeehouse, a folk music venue featuring live music weekly. The coffeehouse has been called perhaps "the most haunting (not haunted) performance space in the City."

The basement of the chapel houses the Postcrypt Art Gallery. At commencement, the university uses St. Paul's for a Baccalaureate Service to commemorate graduates' achievements. The chapel is also popular for weddings.

The chapel has also been used in the past by the Barnard Columbia Ancient Drama Group to present plays in Ancient Greek or Latin.

== In popular culture ==
- In 1969 some parts of the song "The Boxer" by Simon and Garfunkel were recorded in the chapel.
- Judy Collins recorded her a cappella arrangement of "Amazing Grace" in the chapel for her 1970 album Whales & Nightingales, relying heavily on its acoustic reverberation effects.
- In the movie The Mirror Has Two Faces (1996), characters Rose Morgan (Barbra Streisand) and Gregory Larkin (Jeff Bridges), both Columbia University professors, see a concert on their second date in the chapel.

== See also ==
- List of New York City Designated Landmarks in Manhattan
- National Register of Historic Places listings in New York County, New York
