= Stokes Castle =

Historic house in Nevada, United States

- U.S. National Register of Historic Places
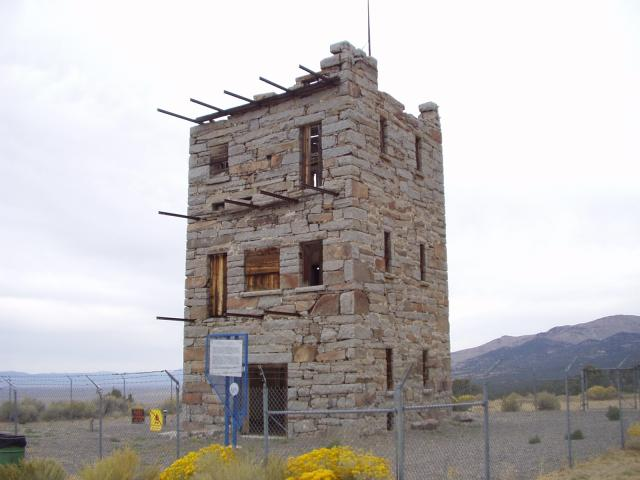

- Location within Nevada Location within the United States
- Location: Castle, US 50 W of Austin, Austin, Nevada
- Coordinates: 39°29′37.13″N 117°4′47.49″W
- Built: 1897
- Architect: Anson Phelps Stokes; Wholey, John C.
- Architectural style: Late Victorian
- NRHP reference No.: 03000757
- Added to NRHP: August 14, 2003

Stokes Castle is a three-story stone tower located near Austin, Nevada. It was built by Anson Phelps Stokes, a mine developer, railroad magnate, and banker. Intending the building as a summer home, Stokes began building the castle in 1896, completing it in 1897.

The castle is patterned after a tower that Stokes had seen and admired in the Roman Campagna in Italy. The castle is built of hand-hewn native granite, and the stones were hoisted into place with a hand winch and held in place with rock wedging and clay mortar. The kitchen and dining room were on the first floor, while the second floor contained the living room and the third floor housed two bedrooms. Each of the floors had a fireplace, and the second and third floors each had a balcony. The roof had a battlemented terrace.

The family occupied the Stokes Castle for a short time. The family traveled west in June 1897 with friends and spent about a month in the castle. They spent a few more days in October 1897. They returned in the summer of 1898, but they sold their mine, the milling equipment, and the castle, and never returned to the town.

Eventually, the castle fell into disrepair until Molly Magee Knudsen, a cousin of Stokes, bought the castle in 1956. The tower was listed on the National Register of Historic Places in 2003. The "Castle" was owned by HW Trapnell of Austin, Nevada and Dunsmuir, California until he died on July 19, 2018. It is now operated by the Austin Historical Society.
