= Isaac Newton Phelps =

American banker

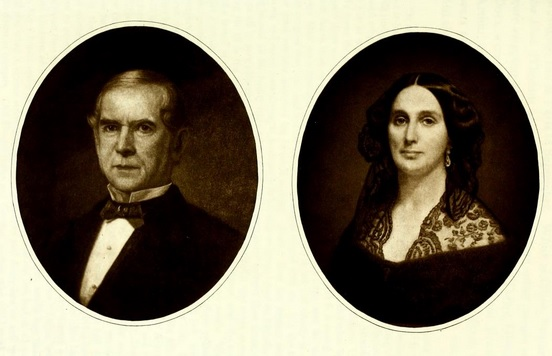
- Sarah Maria (Lusk) and Isaac Newton Phelps
- Born: February 22, 1802; Windsor, Connecticut
- Died: August 1, 1888 (aged 86); Saratoga Springs, New York
- Occupations: Merchant, banker
- Spouse: Sarah Maria Lusk (m. 1828)

Isaac Newton Phelps (1802–1888) was a New York dry goods merchant who, after retiring in 1853, took up a second career in banking, brokerage and property. He founded The Mercantile Bank, was one of the founders of the Second National Bank, a director of the Greenwich Saving Bank and the Central Trust Company. Later his son-in-law, Anson Phelps Stokes joined him in the family banking business.

== Early life ==
Isaac Newton Phelps was born in Windsor, Connecticut, on February 22, 1802. He was descended from George Phelps (1606-1687), who came to America from England in 1630. His parents were Elizabeth Sadd (1768-1816) and Joseph Phelps (1766-1834), who was a farmer living in East Windsor, Connecticut. They had lost their property by acting as guarantors for friends and this hardship ended young Phelps's schooling at the age of thirteen. He started work as an apprenticed clerk in a general store and after eight years was offered a partnership in the business.

== Career ==
In 1828, he married Sarah Maria Lusk (1808-1867), and moved to New York where he started dry goods sales in partnerships, first with William. N. Pickering (Phelps & Pickering), and then in 1834 with James Sheldon (Sheldon and Phelps).

In about 1850, Phelps left the hardware business and joined with John Jay Phelps in the real-estate company of I. N. & J. J. Phelps with offices at 45 Wall Street. An example of their projects was the development of the old Park Theatre site in 1850 with William Backhouse Astor Sr. At the same time Phelps was also on the board of several banks and insurance companies.

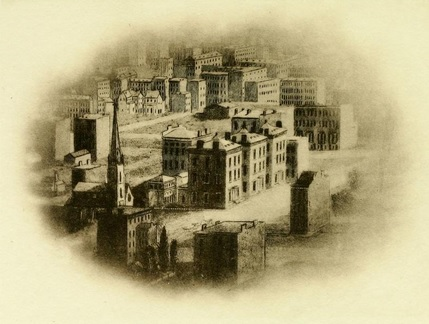
Early view (c. 1855) of 229 (now 231) Madison Avenue before the street was paved

In 1852 Phelps acquired land on Madison Avenue in an area previously undeveloped and built a family house. Three other merchants built adjacent houses at the same time, these were William Earl Dodge, John Jay Phelps and George Dwight Phelps. The only house to have survived from that period is 231 Madison Avenue - the one built by I. N. Phelps - and is now part of the J. P. Morgan Library.

Phelps's partnership with J. J. Phelps ended on the final days of 1857. He continued in business and in the 1870s founded the Phelps Stokes & Co. bank with his son-in-law and James Stokes (Anson's father). The bank closed after the death of James Stokes in 1881. Phelps continued in business with his son-in-law and they were both directors of the Second National Bank when a huge misappropriation of funds was revealed in 1884. The bank's president, John Chester Eno, had speculated and lost millions of dollars on Wall Street during the panic of that year and was forced to resign, then fled to Canada. The directors, including Phelps and Anson Stokes, faced the onerous task of making up the losses. However, Eno's father, Amos R. Eno was persuaded by the board to repay the bulk of the loss. The other directors made up shortfalls to ensure the bank survived the run on deposits. Amos Eno had formally been a partner of John Jay Phelps during the early part of the century, when they ran a highly successful mercantile business.

== Personal life ==
Phelps married Sarah Maria Lusk from Enfield, Connecticut on November 10, 1828. They had two children:

- Sarah Maria Phelps (1833-1859), who married Henry Laverty King in 1859, but died shortly afterwards.
- Helen Louisa Phelps (1846-1915), who married Anson Phelps Stokes in 1865. Stokes was a distant cousin having also been descended from the George Phelps who came to America in 1630.

In 1874, he remarried to the widow Mrs. Anna Frances (née Swartwout) Maullin, of Troy, New York.

Phelps died on August 1, 1888, at his Saratoga summer home. He left a large part of his estate to his daughter Helen, including the Madison Avenue house and a million dollars.

=== Descendants ===
Phelp's first grandchild was born in the Madison Avenue house on the April 11, 1867, and he was named Isaac Newton Phelps Stokes after his grandfather. Phelps's wife had died earlier that year and he asked the newly-weds to move in with him. When he remarried in 1874, his daughter and family moved out to an adjacent property at 230 Madison Avenue.
