= Anson Phelps Stokes =

American philanthropist

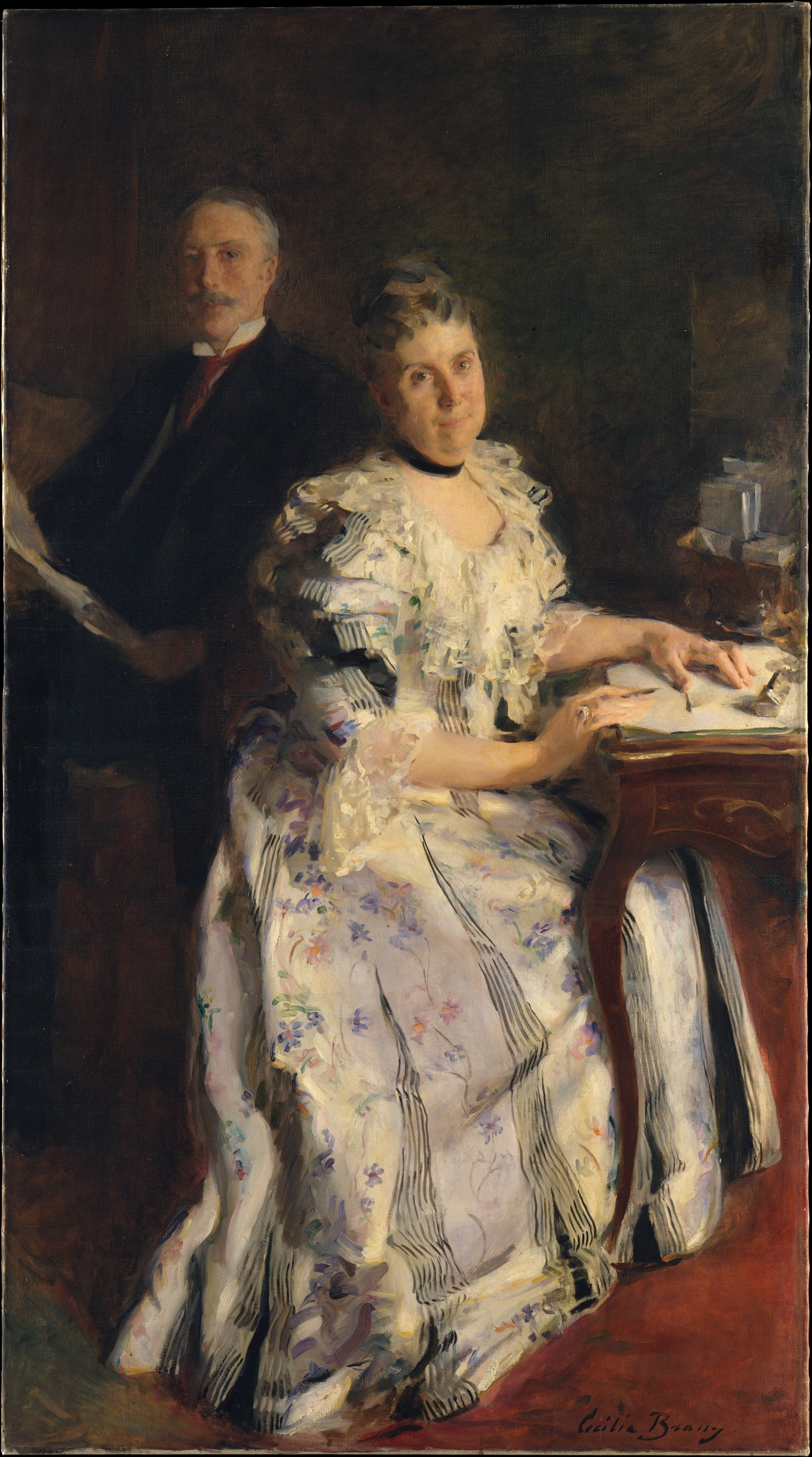
- Mr. and Mrs. Anson Phelps Stokes, about 1898
- Born: February 22, 1838; New York City, New York, U.S.
- Died: June 28, 1913 (aged 75); New York City, New York, U.S.
- Occupations: Merchant, banker, publicist, philanthropist
- Spouse: Helen Louisa Phelps (m. 1865)
- Children: 9, including Isaac, James, Anson
- Parent(s): James Boulter Stokes; Caroline Phelps Stokes
- Relatives: Caroline Phelps Stokes (sister); Olivia Phelps Stokes (sister); William E. D. Stokes (brother); Edward Stiles Stokes (cousin); Isaac Newton Phelps (father-in-law); Rose Pastor Stokes (daughter-in-law); Robert Hunter (son-in-law)

Anson Phelps Stokes (February 22, 1838 – June 28, 1913) was a wealthy American merchant, property developer, banker, genealogist and philanthropist. Born in New York City, he was the son of James Boulter Stokes and wife Caroline (née Phelps). His paternal grandfather was London merchant Thomas Stokes, one of the 13 founders of the London Missionary Society. His maternal grandfather, Anson Greene Phelps, was a New York merchant, born in Connecticut and descended from an old Connecticut family.

== Early life ==
Stokes's early education was by tutors from the Union Theological Seminary who instructed him in mathematics, Latin and Greek. He then attended private schools in New York before joining the family business of Phelps, Dodge & Company in 1855 when he was 17.

== Career ==
=== Phelps, Dodge & Co. ===
Phelps, Dodge & Company was a mercantile establishment founded in 1834 by Anson's grandfather Phelps and his uncles, William Earl Dodge and Daniel James. Stokes’ father James was also a partner when 17 year-old Anson started with the company in 1855, having joined in 1847. The company began importing and trading in metal from England and exporting cotton in return, and eventually became a copper mining business. They also developed extensive interests in lumber, property and rail roads.

In 1861, Stokes became a partner in the company but left in 1878 to begin a banking business with his father and his father-in-law, Isaac Newton Phelps. The bank named Phelps, Stokes & Company, was disbanded when Stokes's father died in 1881. Stokes was also suffering from an eyesight problem at this time that threatened his vision. Despite this he was appointed temporary administrator of his father's estate. The will was contested by James Stokes's daughter, Dora (Stokes) Dale, and her husband Henry and the matter was not settled until 1888.

=== Real estate ===
Stokes purchased land in New York and developed the Stokes Building on Cedar Street in collaboration with I. N. Phelps Estates and his sisters. In 1895 he organized the Woodbridge Company, that owned property on William Street, John Street, and Platt Street. Land for Wyllys Building was bought for his son, Isaac Newton Phelps Stokes, whose architectural practice, Howells & Stokes, carried out the design. In 1902 Stokes organized the Haynes Company, which owned property on Front Street, Burling Slip and a mansion and estate at New Brighton, Staten Island (Curtis High School now occupies the property). Another of his property companies was called Dudley and set up to look after property in Liberty Street and William Street. After his death in 1913 these various property companies and others were consolidated by his sons and his long-term financial advisor, John W. McCulloch, to form Phelps Stokes Estate, Inc. The names of the companies, Wyllys, Woodbridge, Haynes and Dudley reflected Stokes's interest in family genealogy, as they were all names of his or his wife's Connecticut ancestors.

=== Banking ===
Stokes joined his father-in-law as a director at the Second National Bank and the Mercantile Bank. In 1884 there was a run on the Second National Bank following the misappropriation of funds by the bank's president, John Chester Eno. He had speculated and lost millions of dollars on Wall Street during the panic of that year and was forced to resign, then fled to Canada. The directors, including Issac N. Phelps and Anson Stokes, faced the onerous task of making up the losses. However, Eno's father, Amos R. Eno was persuaded by the board to repay the bulk of the loss. The other directors made up shortfalls to ensure the bank survived the run on deposits.

=== Nevada mining and railroad ===
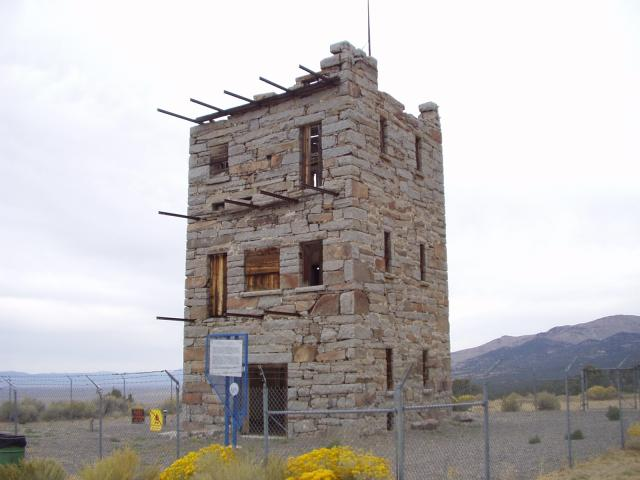
Stokes Castle near Austin, Nevada

Whilst at Phelps Dodge Corporation, Stokes had involvement with mining in the American West, and after leaving in 1879, he continued his interests by focusing on the silver mining boom town of Austin, Nevada, a place he had visited in 1863. Most of the mining claims had been consolidated into one company called the Manhattan Silver Mining Co. and they desperately needed a railroad. The secretary of the company, M. J. Farrell, became state senator for Lander County and managed to get a railroad line approved, with a bond of $200,000, due to expire in 1880. The proposal was to run a narrow gauge line ninety three miles along the Reese Valley to connect Austin to the Central Pacific main line at Battle Mountain. It was not until Stokes became involved that the project got started with only months left on the bond. Stokes brought in General James H. Ledlie, a former Union officer in the Civil War, to direct the project, and crews went to work, only to bring the line within 2 miles (3.2 km) of the Austin town limits with less than a day left before the deadline. An emergency meeting of the Austin Town Board extended the town limits by 2 miles (3.2 km), allowing the last rails to be laid just minutes before the deadline. The line from Battle Mountain to Austin became the Nevada Central Railway.

On February 25, 1880, Stokes was appointed a director of the Nevada Central Railway. In 1881 the Union Pacific Railroad purchased the line, but they lost money and in 1885 it was sold at bankruptcy back to the bond holders who included Anson Stokes. In 1888 a new company was formed, now called Nevada Central Railroad. The line continued to struggle and was closed in 1938.

Stokes had interests in several companies in Nevada and these were incorporated into the Nevada Company, founded in 1897. His son, James Graham Phelps Stokes, who had recently finished his education at Yale and medical school, became the president. In 1897, when Stokes still had a financial interest in several of the local mines, he built "Stokes Castle", a three-story stone tower just outside Austin for his son. The building was only occupied for a month, then fell into disrepair.

=== The Austin Mining Company ===
In July 1891, Stokes met Mr. P. T. Farnsworth, manager of the Horn Silver Mining Company, and Mr. A. C. Washington, president. They owned mining property in Grantsville, Nevada and had done a large business with the Nevada Central Railroad. They had recently surveyed mines in the Austin area and proposed a partnership with Stokes. The company they formed was the Austin Mining Company, organized to undertake silver-mining at Austin, and other areas. The business was initially profitable but, owing largely to the great decline in silver, became unprofitable. In 1898 Stokes was made aware that Farnsworth was not acting in his best interests. A young lawyer, Tasker Oddie, working for Stokes in New York, had been sent to Nevada to look over his mining operations and discovered embezzlement on a huge scale. The operations were shut down and court cases followed as Stokes attempted to recover the money from Farnsworth and Washington. Stokes continued to mine at Berlin near Ione, Nevada.

=== Politics ===
Anson Stokes described his attitude toward politics as follows:

I have been indisposed to political life, because it is here commonly sordid, interferes with freedom of conscience and of thought and of expression and of action, and often brings unpleasant and immoral associations; and I have felt that I could be more useful working non-politically for civil service reform, free trade, etc., and bringing up my children to be good citizens.

Despite this, he did campaign in New York for the election of Grover Cleveland and fought against Tammany Hall - the Democratic Party machine that controlled much of New York City. Tammany Hall had been run by William “Boss” Tweed who had been convicted of corruption and who died in jail in 1872. After his death Tammany was reformed under new leadership, but by the mid-1890s it had returned to its old corrupt ways, first under "Honest John" Kelly, and then Richard Croker. Several of the wealthy and influential men in the city, including Anson Stokes, came together in 1894/95 to fight Tammany Hall, and formed a “Committee of Seventy”. They succeeded by defeating the Tammany mayoral candidate and installing William Lafayette Strong who ran the City on "business principles".

=== The Civil Service Reform Association ===
Stokes was a committee member of the Civil Service Reform Association that included Theodore Roosevelt. The objective of the Association was to establish a system of appointment and promotion in the Civil Service depending upon suitability assessed by competitive examinations, open to all applicants properly qualified, and that removals should be made for legitimate cause only, such as dishonesty, negligence, or inefficiency, but not for political opinion or refusal to render party service. The Pendleton Civil Service Reform Act in 1883 made it law that government positions should be awarded on merit, however the Association continued to push for compliance, improvements, efficiencies and reforms in the U.S. Civil Service.

=== Anti-imperialism ===
Stokes became chairman of the National Association of Anti-Imperialist Clubs, a movement formed in 1898 to oppose the annexation of Cuba, Puerto Rico, Guam and the Philippines at the end of the Spanish-American War. He was also an active member and supporter of the free trade league and first president of the New York Reform Club.

=== Joint metallism ===
In 1894 Stoke published his proposals on a monetary system that would be based on the combined use of gold and silver called joint metallism. This came at a period of financial difficulties when there were calls to allow both gold and silver coinage to be used as currency, a system called bimetallism. Stokes's interest in this possibly came from his links to silver mining in Nevada and his support for Grover Cleveland, who was against bimetallism, favouring the gold standard. Stokes's book ran to several issues and included a series of letter, quotes and extracts.

=== Nautical interests ===
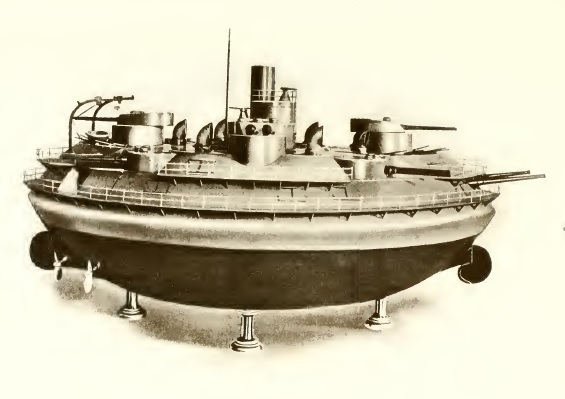
Ultima Globular Naval Battery, designed by Anson Phelps Stokes

Stokes was a keen yachtsman and was twice elected vice commodore of the New York Yacht Club. The yachts he owned were Nereid, Clytie, Sea Fox and Mermaid. He was also involved with efforts to standardise the rules used in international yacht racing.

His interests extended to naval warfare. He designed a warship, referred to as a globular naval battery that was a floating fortress, typically used for harbor defence. The idea came from the story of the British naval use of an island in the Caribbean called Diamond Rock. He published and read a paper on his design called, the Ulitima, in November 1905 before the Society of Naval Architects and Marine Engineers.

== Personal life ==
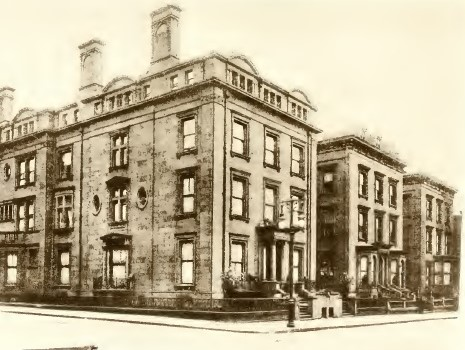
229 Madison Avenue was one of three houses built in 1854. Occupiers Isaac Newton Phelps, John Jay Phelps and William E. Dodge.

On October 17, 1865, Stokes married Helen Louisa Phelps (1846–1930). They were related, both being descended from George Phelps (c. 1606 – 1687) who came to America in 1630 from England. Together, they were the parents of:

1. Isaac Newton Phelps Stokes (1867–1944), an architect, who, in 1895, married Edith Minturn (1867–1937), daughter of shipping magnate, Robert Bowne Minturn, Jr. (1836–1889); Edith, by way of a sister, Sarah May Minturn (1865–1919) – who was married to Henry Dwight Sedgwick III (1861–1957) – was a great-aunt of actress Edie Sedgwick (née Edith Minturn Sedgwick; 1943–1971);
2. Sarah Maria Phelps Stokes (1869–1943), who, in 1890, married Baron Halkett (né Hugh Colin Gustave George Halkett III; 1861–1904) (aka Baron Halkett of London and Frelsdorfermühlen, Hanover; a district next to Frelsdorf); they divorced in England in 1902; she wrote children's books under the pseudonym Aunt Sadie;
3. Helen Olivia Phelps Stokes (1870–1945), who was an activist and painter;
4. James Graham Phelps Stokes (1872–1960), a noted socialist, who, in 1905, married Rose Harriet Pastor (née Wieslander; 1879–1933), a social activist and feminist;
5. Rev. Anson Phelps Stokes Jr. (1874–1958), an educator and clergyman;
6. Ethel Valentine Phelps Stokes (1876–1952), married philanthropist John Sherman Hoyt in 1895;
7. Caroline Margaretta Phelps Stokes (1878–1964), who, in 1903, married Wiles Robert Hunter (1874–1942), sociologist and author;
8. Mildred Evelyn Phelps Stokes (1881–1970), who, in 1907, married Ransom Spafard Hooker, M.D. (1873–1957);
9. Harold Montrose Phelps Stokes (1887–1970), who wrote for The New York Times as a free-lance author

On August 12, 1899, Anson lost one of his legs in a horse-riding accident when he was thrown against a tree and his leg crushed. He had been warned that the horse, a gelding called Dingley, was dangerous but felt confident that he could handle the animal. After the accident a vet cared for the horse, but recommended that the horse be destroyed due to its unpredictable temperament.

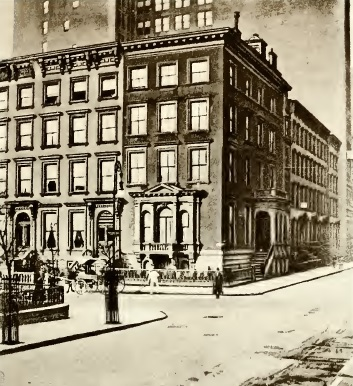
Anson Phelps Stokes died at 230 Madison Avenue in 1913.

Stokes died on June 28, 1913, at 230 Madison Avenue, and was survived by nine children: four sons and five daughters. His personal wealth was estimated at $25,000,000 at the time of his death, or about $814,393,939 in today's dollars. However, when his estate was settled, a month after his death, it was reported that the actual value of his estate was between $500,000 and $750,000 (about $24,431,818 in today's dollars. His widow, Helen Louisa (Phelps) Stokes survived him and died in 1930.

=== Madison Avenue ===
When he was married in 1865, Stokes and his wife planned to set up home next to Anson Stokes's father, James Stokes, who lived at 37 Madison Avenue. However, Helen's father, Isaac Newton Phelps, expressed a wish that they live near him at 229 Madison Avenue, so James Stokes compromised and purchased 133 Madison Avenue for the young couple – midway between the two families. When Helen's mother died in 1867, they moved in with her widowed father at number 229. In 1869, he remarried and Helen and Anson moved out to 230 Madison Avenue (a gift from her father). When Isaac Newton Phelps died in 1888 he left 229 Madison Avenue (plus a million dollars), to his daughter Helen Stokes.

The building was extended by architect R. H. Robertson in 1888, adding an attic floor and an extension on East 37th Street that doubled the size of the house. This remained the New York home of the Stokes family until they sold it in 1904 to Mr. J. P. Morgan and moved back into 230 Madison Avenue. The house of James Stokes (37 Madison Avenue) passed to his children and several of them continued to live there until in 1905 it was rebuilt as the Madison Square Apartment House by Isaac Newton Phelps Stokes.

229 Madison Avenue was one of three similar houses built in 1854 in what was, at the time, an unfashionable part of town. One built by Isaac Newton Phelps, on the corner of Thirty-seventh Street, another by John Jay Phelps on the corner of Thirty-sixth Street and in the middle, one built by William E. Dodge, Anson Stokes's uncle. Anson and Helen's first child, Isaac Newton Phelps Stokes, was born at 229 Madison Avenue. The house survives and is now number 231 Madison Avenue and part of the Morgan Library & Museum complex.

=== Shadowbrook ===
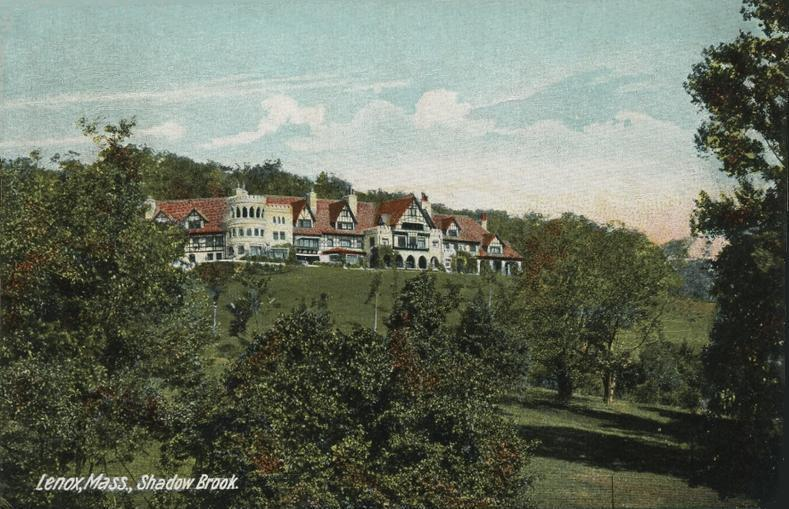
Shadowbrook in 1908 in Lenox, Massachusetts

In 1893, Stokes built Shadowbrook, a 100-room Berkshire Cottage at Lenox, Massachusetts. Shadowbrook was so large that a family anecdote tells of Anson Phelps Stokes Jr. being told by his mother while playing outside one day that because there was a storm gathering he should come inside and bicycle in the attic. Shadowbrook was sold in 1906 to Spencer P. Shotter a wealthy turpentine magnate from Georgia.

=== Other properties ===
The Stokes owned a house on Staten Island, purchased in 1868 from John M. Pendleton. Several of their children were born there. They sold in 1886, never to return, because "cheap excursion places had caused the ferry-boats to be overcrowded and had brought a rough element to the island." Stokes had built several "cottages" on the property before they vacated.

In 1902, Stokes bought land at the southern tip of Long Neck, a small peninsula in Darien, Connecticut, and built Brick House (architects Howell & Stokes), where he and his family lived for many years. (Andrew Carnegie occupied Brick House for several summers, and in 1917 he bought Stokes' estate Shadowbrook, where he died in 1919.) The Stokes family also had a summer house, or Great Camp, on Upper St. Regis Lake in the Adirondacks, where family members spend their summers to this day.

== Family ==
=== Caroline & Olivia Stokes ===
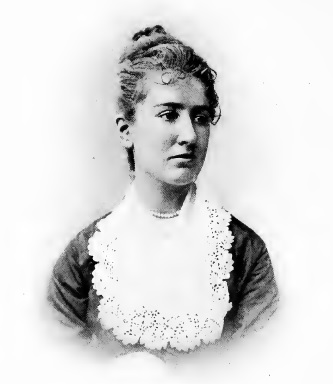
Stokes's sister Caroline Phelps Stokes

Anson Stokes's sisters, Caroline and Olivia, supported the furtherance of deprived groups by giving money to universities and colleges. They also funded orphanages, libraries and affordable housing schemes, often with design help from their architect nephew, Isaac Newton Phelps Stokes. Their work extended to other countries such as Liberia and the Near East.

On April 26, 1909, Caroline died at Redlands, California. Anson Stokes and Olivia were executors of the will that required a fund to be set up and used for the erection or improvement of dwellings in New York City for the poor families, for educational of negroes, Native Americans and needy deserving white students, through industrial schools, the foundation of scholarships and the erection or endowment of school buildings or chapels. The Phelps Stokes Fund was to be managed by eleven trustees. Initially Anson Stokes was reluctant to become involved (he was 71 in 1909), and had told his sister this before she died. However, because of the charitable nature of the bequests he agreed to assist with setting up the trust fund.

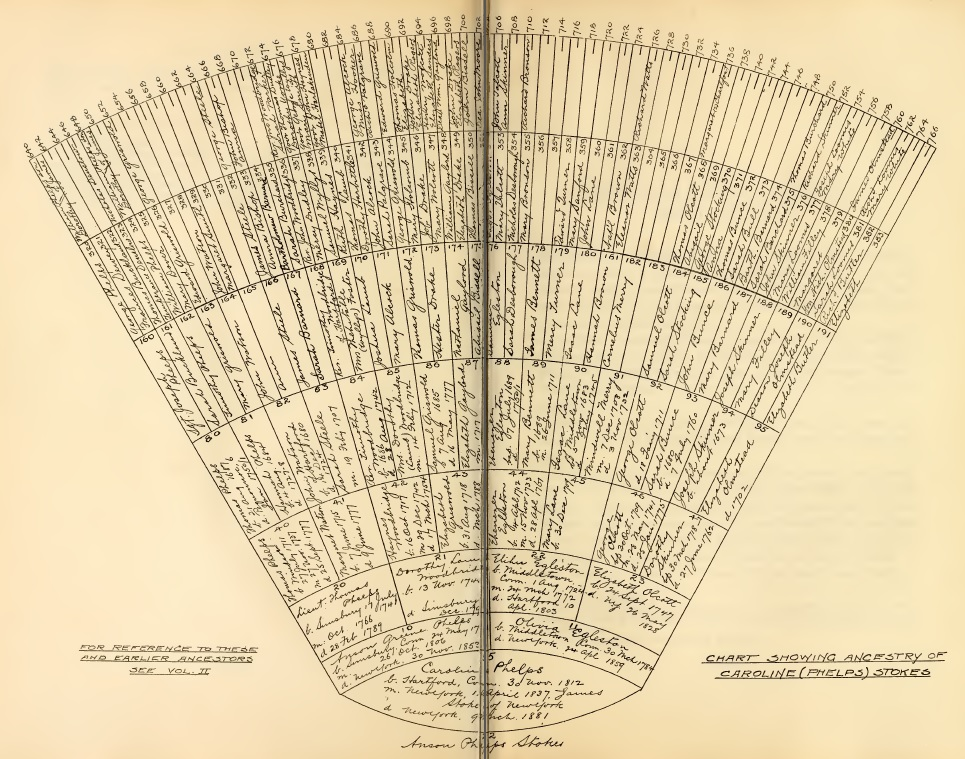
Caroline (Phelps) Stokes family tree published in Stokes Records 1910

=== Edward S. Stokes ===
Anson Stokes' cousin, Edward Stiles Stokes, shot and mortally wounded James Fisk in the Grand Central Hotel on 6 January 1872. The pair had been business associates with Stokes supplying oil from his Brooklyn refinery to Fisk's Erie Railway. They both fell for the same woman and this created animosity between the two men, resulting in court cases and a breakdown of their personal and business relationship. Fisk was a popular, rich and well connected but unscrupulous man. He had made a fortune in manipulating Erie Rail Road stock and had strong links to Tammany Hall. Edward S. Stokes was tried three times and eventually found guilty of manslaughter in the third degree, serving four years in jail. Anson Stokes' father, James, advanced money to Edward, who was the son of his brother, Edward Halesworth Stokes. He also forbade Anson from associating with him but Anson attended most of the sessions of the trial, as he felt it was his duty.

=== Genealogy ===
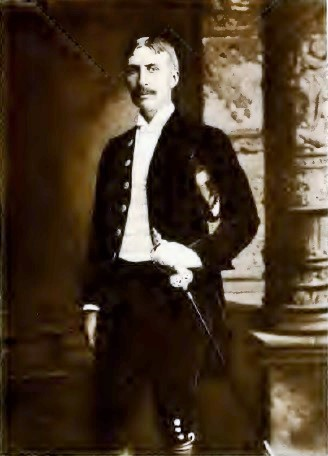
Anson P. Stokes in court dress

Stokes took an interest in tracing his family history. He often visited England and used these occasions to locate relatives and the areas where his ancestors had lived. In 1909, he published the first volume of Stokes Records - notes on his ancestry and that of his wife. The final volume was printed in 1915, having been finished by his children.

Whilst in England Stokes joined in fox-hunting and grouse shooting, taking country residents or staying with family or acquaintances. He enjoyed the social scene, attending Cowes Week with his cousin Arthur James, on board his yacht Lancashire Witch plus race horse meetings at Goodwood. His wife and daughters, Sarah and Helen, were presented at court in 1889. He attended court of Queen Victoria at St James's Palace during the London seasons, keeping a set of clothes for the occasion - black velvet coat, waistcoat, black silk stockings, shoes with buckles and a sword with a black scabbard.

== Lists of business and charitable involvements ==
Stokes was involved with a large number of organizations during his life. Listed below are many of the businesses, clubs, and churches.

Director or trustee of the following organizations:
Adirondack Cottage Sanitarium.
American Social Science Association, Treasurer.
American Tract Society.
Ansonia Brass & Copper Co.
Ansonia Copper Co.
Ansonia Land & Water Powder Co.
Austin Mining Co.
Board of Managers of Diocesan Missions.
Dudley Family Association, vice-president.
Estate of L N. Phelps.
Fund for Aged and Infirm Clergy, Protestant Episcopal Church.
Fund for Widows and Orphans of Clergy of the Protestant Episcopal Church.
Graham Building.
Greenwich Savings Bank.
Home for Incurables.
Liverpool & London & Globe Insurance Co.
Manhattan Storage Company.
Mechanics' National Bank.
Member of the Corporation of the Metropolitan Museum of Art.
Mercantile National Bank.
Nevada Central Railway.
Nevada Company.
New York Eye and Ear Infirmary.
Pennsylvania Joint Lumber & Land Co.
Phelps, Dodge & Co.
Phelps, James & Co.
Phelps, Stokes & Co.
Second National Bank.
Society for the Prevention of Cruelty to Animals.
Society of Colonial Wars, State of New York, Lieutenant-Governor.
Stokes Building.
United States Electric Lighting Co.
United States Trust Company.
Woodbridge Company.
Wyllys Company.

Membership of the following clubs:
Century Association.
Church Club, vice-president.
City Club.
Civil Service Reform Association, Executive Committee.
Columbia Debating Club.
Down Town Association.
Drug Club.
Free Trade Club, vice-president.
Free Trade League.
Institution of Naval Architects, London.
Knickerbocker Club.
Lawyers' Club.
Lenox Club.
Mahkeenac Boating Club, President.
Metropolitan Club.
New York Yacht Club, Vice-Commodore, two terms.
Newport Casino.
Nineteenth Century Club, vice-president.
Patriarchs.
Reform Club, First President.
Seawanhaka Corinthian Yacht Club.
Society of Colonial Wars (on Louisbourg Memorial).
Society of Naval Architects and Marine Engineers.
St. George's Society.
St. Regis Yacht Club.
Underwriters' Club.
Union League Club.

Belonged to the following churches:
Mercer Street Presbyterian.
Madison Square Presbyterian, Deacon.
Christ Church, New Brighton, Warden.
Church of the Heavenly Rest, Vestryman.
Church of the Incarnation.
