= Caroline Phelps Stokes =

American philanthropist

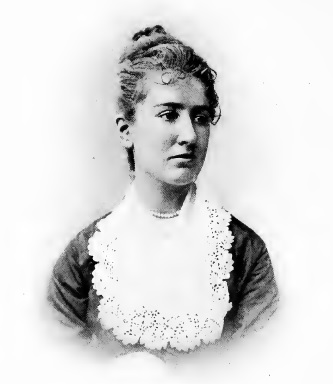
- Born: December 4, 1854; New York City, New York, U.S.
- Died: April 26, 1909 (aged 54); Redlands, California, U.S.
- Parent(s): James Boulter Stokes; Caroline Phelps Stokes
- Relatives: Anson Phelps Stokes (brother); Olivia Phelps Stokes (sister); Anson Greene Phelps (grandfather); Edward Stiles Stokes (cousin); Grace Hoadley Dodge (cousin); Isaac Phelps Stokes (nephew)

Caroline Phelps Stokes (December 4, 1854 – April 26, 1909) was a benefactor to many organizations that helped the underprivileged in the US, Africa and the Near East, supporting churches, libraries, educational establishments, orphanages, housing and more. A fund was set up after her death that continued to support her work.

== Early life ==
She was born in New York on December 4, 1854. She was the daughter of Caroline (née Phelps) Stokes and her father James Boulter Stokes. They were a family with strong religious convictions who saw it as their duty to help those less fortunate. She lived at her parents house on the East River until the age of three, when she moved with her family to 37 Madison Avenue. She attended boarding school at Farmington, Connecticut at the same time as her second cousin, Grace Hoadley Dodge, who later became an important figure in the history of female education and reform.

== Life and inheritance ==
Caroline's parents died within months of each other in 1881, leaving an estate worth several million dollars to their seven children. However, the will was contested by Caroline's sister Dora, and it was 1888 before the money could be distributed. The family home at 37 Madison Avenue was retained and Caroline lived there with her sister, Olivia, until the building was redeveloped in 1902.

As a child, Caroline (Carrie to her family) spent her summers away from New York near Ansonia, Connecticut. She donated a public library to the town in 1892, although the town found the gift to be a financial burden. The library bears a plaque dedicating it to her parents and grandfather (Anson Greene Phelps). She also donated an Anna Sewell memorial fountain and horse trough outside the public library in 1892.

She and her sister Olivia worked together on many charitable projects such as the St. Paul's Chapel at Columbia University, Woodbridge Hall at Yale (part of the Hewitt Quadrangle) and the Haynes Memorial Gates at Hartford First Church Cemetery. Several of the buildings they funded were designed by their nephew, Isaac Newton Phelps Stokes, who was a partner in the architectural firm of Howells & Stokes.

At the black Tuskegee Institute, founded by Booker T. Washington, they funded bathhouses, a chapel, the Dorothy Hall training building, and entrance gates, working with architect Robert Robinson Taylor. The institute provided vocational training and many of the buildings were constructed by the students. Other works supported by the sisters for African American students were at Hampton Institute Virginia, Calhoun School Alabama and Berea College Kentucky.

Caroline gave money to the American College in Beirut to fund the training school for nurses.

In New York she supported the African American orphanages, homes for the elderly, and low cost housing. She also had interests in nature, supporting a project to preserve wild flowers and gave money for the protection of wild birds.

== Personal life ==
Stokes moved to California for health reasons towards the end of her life and died in her home at Redlands on April 16, 1909. In her will she detailed her wish for a fund to be set to provide housing and education for African Americans, Native Americans plus needy and deserving white students.

Her sister, Olivia, continued her charitable works and acted as a trustee of the Phelps Stokes Fund. She also donated two tenements to the fund called the Dudley complex at 339-349 East 32nd Street, New York, designed by her nephew, Isaac Newton Phelps Stokes. She, like her sister Caroline, never married and died in 1927.
