= Arnold Johan Ferdinand Van Laer =

Dutch American translator and archivist

A. J. F. van Laer

Arnold Johan Ferdinand van Laer (21 October 1869, in Utrecht – 25 March 1955, in Albany, New York) was an archivist, translator, editor, and historian of Dutch-language documents from New Netherland and seventeenth century Albany, New York.

== Career ==
From 1887 until 1892 Van Laer studied in Delft. He emigrated to Albany, New York, in 1897, where he married Naomi van Deurs (1868–1930), with whom he had three sons. Van Laer became the archivist at the New York State Library at Albany. He worked tirelessly the remainder of his life to translate and to reconstruct documents damaged in the New York State Capitol library fire of 25 March 1911.
