= Royal Insurance Building (San Francisco) =

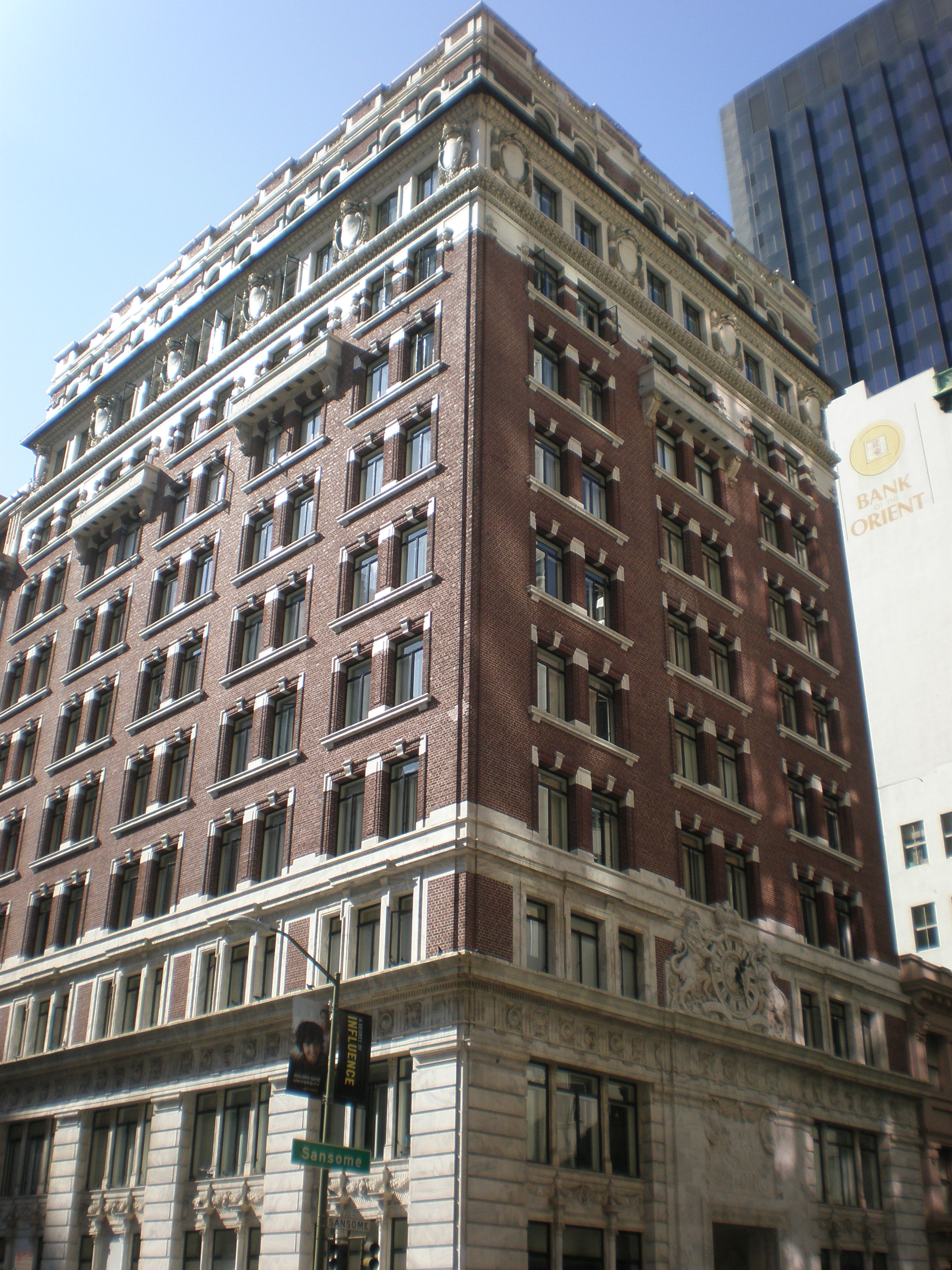
- Royal Insurance Building, San Francisco

- Location within San Francisco Royal Insurance Bldg (California) Royal Insurance Bldg (the United States)

General information
- Location: 201 Sansome Street, San Francisco, California
- Coordinates: 37°47′32″N 122°24′05″W
- Completed: 1907

Design and construction
- Architect: Howells & Stokes

San Francisco Designated Landmark
- Designated: 1983
- Reference no.: 160

The Royal Insurance Building is a former office building located at 201 Sansome Street, San Francisco, California, and now converted to condominiums.

== History ==
It is a San Francisco Designated Landmark (#160), built in 1907 to designs by architects Howells & Stokes. Its facade and marble entryway sculpture appears to be very similar to that of the former Royal Insurance Building at William Street and Maiden Lane in New York City, designed by the same architect. The sculpture is apparently by Rochette and Parzini. It is crowned by a clock, supported by the lion and unicorn, with English roses and Scottish thistles, and the motto "Tutum te sistam". Two cartouches contain the Liver bird to the left, representing Liverpool, and a cross and dagger to the right.

Howells & Stokes, who were located in New York City, sent Seattle architect Abraham H. Albertson as their representative to supervise the construction.

== Sources ==
- Pacific Coast Architecture Database entry
- Noe Hill description
- "The Royal Insurance Building", Architectural Record, Volumes 19–20, pages 361–364. (Describes the New York City building)
