= Metropolitan Family Services =

American non-profit organization

- Formation: 1857
- Type: NPO
- Legal status: Operational
- Purpose: Humanitarian
- Headquarters: Chicago, IL
- Region served: U.S.A
- Budget: US$ 33 Million (2008)
- Website: Metropolitan Family Services

Metropolitan Family Services (MFS) is a non-profit organization in Chicago. Through seven major community centers and public policy advocacy, Metropolitan serves low-income and working poor families.

== History ==
=== 19th century ===
The organization was founded in 1857 by a group of prominent Illinois businessmen, among them Norman B. Judd and John Kinzie. Under the name Chicago Relief and Aid Society, it became the first official charitable organization in Chicago. During the Civil War, the Chicago Relief and Aid Society formed a soldiers relief committee which provided aid to many of the wounded. Several of the committee members, such as Isaac N. Arnold, Mark Skinner, John Kinzie, Philip J. Wardner, and Joseph D. Webster, became national figures.

In 1871, the Great Chicago Fire consumed the city, leaving over 300 dead and over 100,000 homeless. The Society's board of directors formed a special committee to oversee the relief process. In addition to the $5 Million in donations that were received, thousands of tools, sewing machines and other equipment were donated to small businesses to regain their ability to produce goods, whereas 3,000 small and 5,000 large shelters were produced for the victims. Barracks were built in five locations throughout the burnt district and 64,000 smallpox vaccines were administered. According to statistics, between October, 1871 and May, 1873, the Society aided virtually half the population of the city when the fire broke out. Mayor R.B. Mason was quoted as saying, "I have deemed it best for the interest of the city to turn over to the CHICAGO RELIEF AND AID SOCIETY all contributions for the suffering people of this city."

=== 20th century ===
==== 1900–1939 ====
In 1909, with the city population growing and the need for relief rising, the Chicago Bureau of Charities merged with The Chicago Relief and Aid Society to form the United Charities of Chicago. As United Charities, the organization became more active in the community in promoting progressive public policies and addressing health issues such as the Mothers Pension Law Act of 1911.

Though programs within the agency continue to be successful, the Great Depression proved to be the agency's greatest trial. The United Charities went from aiding 2,500 families a month in 1928 to over 33,000 by 1931. With the tension of the depression lessening through government intervention by the mid-1930s, the agency was able to focus more on the families it could best serve. In 1935, psychiatrists were hired to train the staff and the "Family Service Bureau" was established, allowing the agency to offer family consultation along with its relief efforts.

==== 1940–1989 ====
By the 1950s, more attention was focused on "multi-problem" families who struggled with complex social issues, difficult spousal and parent-child relationships, economic housing pressures and mental illness. The Family Service Bureau undertook special projects to help unmarried mothers and their children through the Women's Service Division. In response to increasing demand for services and long waiting lists, in 1963 the organization's board of directors made policy decisions for the family services Bureau, directing program emphases to families with minors and the elderly. The agency also began to show renewed interest in social policy.

In 1971, the agency added a department of social affairs (later renamed Social Advocacy) to influence government policy which affected its clients. Emphasis was placed on two areas - how government programs connect with the poor and on influencing legislators related thinking and action towards the poor. Achievements include the passing of the Domestic Violence act of 1982, the Energy Assistance Act of 1985, and the Elder Abuse Act of 1988. The organization also began to seek expansion into Chicago's suburbs, and in 1987 acquired the Family Services of DuPage now known as the DuPage Center.

==== 1990s ====
The 1990s began a new multi-year strategy for the organization. In addition to its services for individuals and families, emphasis was also placed on strategies to initiate systematic change through social advocacy so that government implementation of policies would be the most effective for families. A major effort to address long term concerns about the agency's name and image cumulated in 1995 with the changing of the name from United Charities to Metropolitan Family Services (MFS).

The acquisition of the Family Counseling Services of Evanston/Skokie Valley agency and the Child Abuse Prevention Services (CAPS) in 1996 further complemented the strategy and change of the agency. The same year, MFS began operating a Head Start early childhood education program though its Midway Center to serve more than 100 children ages 3 and 4.

=== 21st century ===
In 2004, as a result of Mayor Richard Daley's Early Child Care and Education Plan Metropolitan Family Services opened up its second and third child care centers.

== Programs and services ==
- Child and Youth Development
- Counseling
- Economic Stability
- Employee Assistance Network (EAN)
- Legal Aid
- Mental Health
- Older Adults Services
- Parent Development
- Public Policy
- Violence Prevention and Intervention

== Locations ==
=== Chicago centers ===
- Calumet Center in Roseland
- Midway Center in West Lawn
- North Center in Portage Park
- Southeast Chicago Center in South Chicago

=== Suburban centers ===
- DuPage Center in Wheaton
- Evanston/Skokie Valley Center
- Southwest Center in Palos Hills
