= William Earl Dodge Stokes =

American businessman

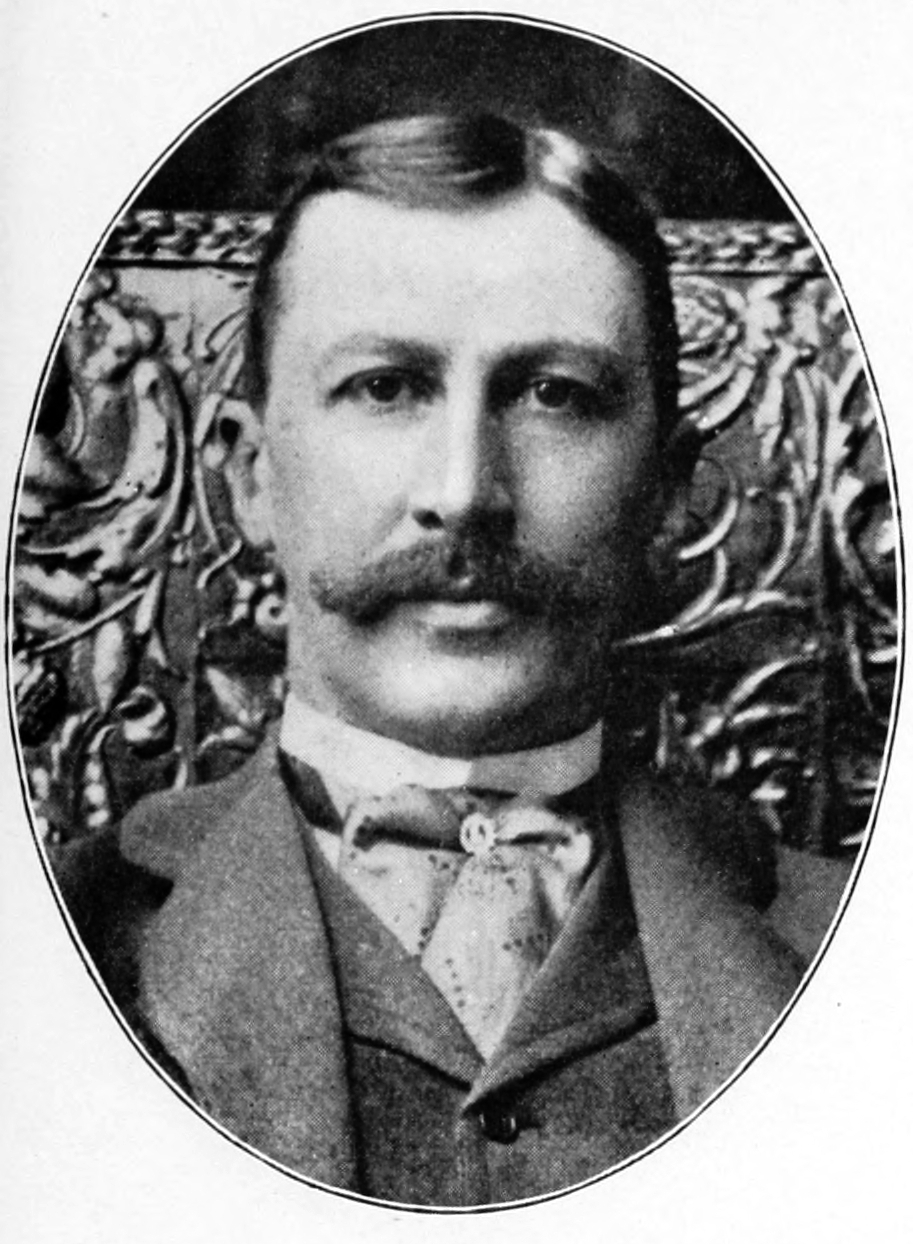
- Born: May 22, 1852; New York City, U.S.
- Died: May 18, 1926 (aged 73); New York City, U.S.
- Education: Yale College
- Employer: Phelps, Dodge & Company
- Spouses: Rita Hernandez de Alba Acosta (m. 1895; div. 1900) Helen Blanche Ellwood (m. 1911)
- Children: 3
- Parent(s): James Boulter Stokes; Caroline Phelps Stokes
- Relatives: Anson Phelps Stokes (brother); Olivia Phelps Stokes (sister); Caroline Phelps Stokes (sister); Anson G. Phelps (grandfather); William E. Dodge (uncle)

William Earle Dodge Stokes (May 22, 1852 – May 18, 1926) was an American multimillionaire who developed many buildings on New York City's Upper West Side.

== Early life ==
Stokes was born in New York City on May 22, 1852. He was the son of James Boulter and Caroline (née Phelps) Stokes; brother of Anson Phelps Stokes, Caroline Phelps Stokes, and Olivia Eggleston Phelps Stokes. His paternal grandfather was London merchant Thomas Stokes, one of the 13 founders of the London Missionary Society, and Anson Stokes later actively supported the American Bible Society, the American Tract Society and the American Peace Society. His other grandfather, Anson Greene Phelps, was a New York merchant, born in Connecticut and descended from an old Massachusetts family.

Stokes was a member of the Yale College Class of 1874. He helped purchase a corner plot at the corner of Prospect and Trumbull streets in New Haven, Connecticut, where the first Hall for Wolf's Head Society was erected in 1884. Stokes was an honorary member of the society, founded in 1883, tapped with a number of alumni who assisted the upstart students.

== Career ==
As a young man Stokes started his career working in the family business, Phelps, Dodge & Company, a mercantile establishment founded by his grandfather Phelps and his uncle, William Earle Dodge, Sr., in the 1830s. By the time that Stokes joined the company, it had become a mining business. He was also a share holder in the Ansonia Clock Company. When his father died in August 1881, Stokes contested the will, sued his brother Anson for conspiring to throw him out of the family business, and gained a $1 million inheritance. He left Phelps Dodge and, from 1885 to 1890, he developed real estate on the Upper West Side.

=== Property developer ===
After his marriage in 1895, the couple moved into one of Stokes's new developments at 262 West 72nd Street. In 1898, Stokes began work on a new mansion at 4 East 54th Street designed by McKim, Mead and White. As the house was nearing completion, Rita Stokes filed for divorce in 1900, and neither ever lived in the house.

In 1899, Stokes commissioned architect Paul E. Duboy (1857-1907) to build the Ansonia Hotel in Manhattan, New York. Named after Stokes' grandfather industrialist Anson Greene Phelps, the hotel opened in 1903 at 2109 Broadway between West 73rd and 74th Streets. The $3 million Ansonia had 350 suites with several restaurants, a bank, a barbershop, a ballroom, a swimming pool and full hotel services, along with an imposing Parisian-style facade of turrets and balconies.

In 1907, the New York Board of Health planned to raid the Ansonia hotel's roof and confiscate the four pet geese and a pig, called Nanki-Poo, that they had been informed that Stokes kept there. Stokes and his butler hid the animals in the basement and convinced the inspector that the roof was animal-free.

=== Railroad venture ===
In 1900, as reported in The New York Times, Stokes bought at auction, for $25,000, the Chesapeake & Western Railroad, a bucolic venture that in an earlier incarnation, circa 1870s, was to be part of the Washington, Cincinnati & St. Louis Railroad, linking through the Shenandoah Valley at Harrisonburg, Virginia and into the central and southern coal producing areas of West Virginia and southern Ohio. The Chesapeake & Western had already been capitalized with $811,200 of common stock, $608,400 of preferred stock and $1,419,000 of first mortgage bonds. Stokes renamed it the Tidewater & West Virginia, but just a year later in 1901 renamed it the Chesapeake Western Railway. In an attempt to revive the plan to link more of east with west, Stokes pushed west and laid 13 miles of rail to Stokesville, west of Bridgewater in 1902, and east to Elkton. The Allegheny and Blue Ridge Mountains proved to be formidable obstacles to further expansion, and without serious financial backing there was no chance of true success.

Stokes' best chance for success came in the form of an offer by Colonel Henry H. Rogers, a major stakeholder in Standard Oil, who attempted to buy the 40-mile railroad from Stokes, so he could complete the route as intended, but Stokes' asking price was far too high and Rogers turned down the offer and chartered his own railroad, the Virginian Railway, which became one of the nation's most efficient and best run railroads.

Eventually, the Chesapeake Western Railway became a subsidiary of the Norfolk Southern and survives to this day, primarily linking Harrisonburg to Staunton, Virginia.

=== Publications ===
In 1917, Stoke wrote The Right to be Well Born; or, Horse Breeding in its Relation to Eugenics which was published by C. J. O'Brien in New York. In this book, Stokes, who was a horse breeder, extended his theories from the equine, advocating selective breeding in humans and the grading of men who are candidates for marriage. He writes that the genealogical records of the working class should be kept so that prospective employers can assess their capabilities. The book was so ill-received that the publishers sued Stokes for the recovery of their costs.

== Personal life ==
In 1895, aged 43, Stokes married 19-year-old Rita Hernandez de Alba Acosta, the daughter of Cuban émigré Ricardo de Acosta. Rita's youngest sister, Mercedes de Acosta, wrote in her autobiography that "when Rita finally decided to marry Will Stokes it was, I believe, because she felt his wealth could open doors... But she paid a high price for any material gain." Rita and William were the parents of one son, William Earl Dodge Stokes Jr., a.k.a. W. E. D. Stokes, whom they called "Weddie". According to her sister, Rita hated the child and could hardly bring herself to hold him. In 1900, Rita filed for divorce and the settlement was said to be $2 million, a record at that time.

In 1907, Stokes was sued by a woman named Lucy Randolph for child support. She claimed that she had met Stokes in the Ansonia and that he had told her that he wanted to have a child with her. After getting her pregnant Stokes had ignored her. Although it was proved in court that Stokes had been intimate with her, and that he had previously given her regular payments, the case against him was dismissed on a technicality.

In February 1911, Stokes, then aged 59, secretly married the 24-year-old Helen Blanche Ellwood. He married in secret because when he was divorced by his first wife, Rita de Acosta Stokes, the judge had told him he could not marry again during her lifetime. In June 1911, Stokes was shot and wounded by a 22-year-old vaudeville actress, Lillian Graham. She claimed that Stokes had attacked her because he was angry at her refusal to return compromising letters he had written her. For his part, Stokes claimed that Graham had been trying to blackmail him and that she had attacked him when this had been unsuccessful. Graham was found not guilty. Together, William and Helen were the parents of:

- James Ellwood Stokes (d. 1998), also a developer and philanthropist.
- Helen Muriel Stokes (1915–2010), who married Charles Jules Lowen, Jr. in 1941. After his death in 1956, she married Donald F. Magarrell, who died in 1980. In 1989, she married childhood friend Gerald H. Phipps.

In 1918, Stokes filed for divorce from Helen Stokes. Stokes was represented by attorney Max Steuer, and started what proved to be a very acrimonious legal case. He claimed that she had had affairs with her cousin, his own son and at least nine other men. She stated that his witnesses were lying, and that he had had numerous affairs throughout their marriage, that with Lillian Graham being just one. She added that he kept several dozen chickens in their apartment at the Ansonia. In February 1922 Rita de Acosta Lydig appeared before the Supreme Court of Justice on behalf of Helen Stokes, claiming that Stokes used to beat her during their marriage. In 1923, after paying $1 million in legal fees, Stokes' request for a divorce from his wife was denied; she won a counterclaim for separation. Stokes was tried for conspiracy to defame her, but was acquitted in 1925.

Stokes died on May 18, 1926, aged 74, and The New York Times noted in his obituary that, even though Stokes had been involved in "almost incessant litigation," he had left about $8 million in his will. However, in 1928 that estimate was reduced to $300,000, and even that would be erased, The Times said, "if his estate lost all the many pending lawsuits that plagued his controversial career, even after death".
