= Anson Green Phelps =

American entrepreneur and businessman

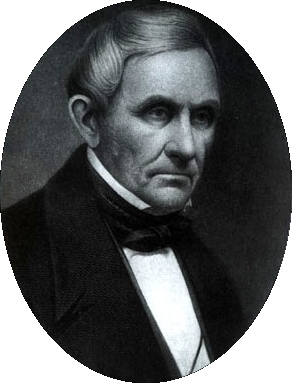
- Anson Green Phelps, industrialist and philanthropist
- Born: March 24, 1781; Simsbury, Connecticut
- Died: May 18, 1858 (aged 76); New York City, New York
- Resting place: New York Marble Cemetery, re-interred, Green-Wood Cemetery
- Known for: Co-founder Phelps, Dodge and Company, which later became Phelps-Dodge Corporation

Anson Green Phelps (March 24, 1781 – May 18, 1858) was an American entrepreneur and business man from Connecticut. Beginning with a saddlery business, he founded Phelps, Dodge & Co. in 1833 as an export-import business with his sons-in-law as partners, William E. Dodge in NYC and Daniel James based in Liverpool, England. His third son-in-law, James Boulter Stokes, became a partner some years later.

Later in the 19th century after the senior Phelps' death (22 years), Phelps Dodge acquired mining interests and companies in the American West, and became known primarily as a mining company.

== Early life ==
Anson Green Phelps was born in Simsbury, Connecticut, in 1781; his mother died when he was 12 years old. Afterward, he was raised in the house of the Congregational minister of Simsbury. Phelps was descended from the early American colonial governors of Connecticut, Thomas Dudley, John Haynes and George Wyllys. On October 13, 1799, he chose a relative, Thomas Woodbridge Phelps, as his guardian.

On May 5, 1799, Thomas Woodbridge Phelps and Anson Green Phelps were admitted to the Congregational Church in South Canton, Connecticut, which was led by Reverend Jeremiah Hallock. In his early adulthood, Anson Phelps left Simsbury and settled in Hartford, Connecticut.

== Career ==
After moving to Hartford, Phelps began manufacturing saddles and shipping them to the South. His business grew rapidly. He had a large brick building constructed on North Main street, which became known as the "Phelps Block." In 1812 he moved to New York City and began doing business with Elisha Peck under the firm name of Phelps, Peck & Co. in the United States. In Liverpool, England, where Peck managed it, the firm was known as Peck, Phelps & Co. They dealt in metal imports from England including tin, tin plate, iron, and brass; and exported cotton from the South to the textile mills in England. Such cotton trade was highly important to England and contributed to its considering support for the Confederacy during the American Civil War.

Fellow businessman Sheldon Smith persuaded Phelps to invest in the growing town of Derby, Connecticut, in an area that came to be known as Birmingham. Unable to grow his business farther north, Phelps selected a location on the east bank of the Naugatuck River in what is now downtown Ansonia. Ansonia was first settled in 1652 and named in honor of Anson Phelps. The state chartered Ansonia as a borough of Derby in 1864, and later as a separate town in 1889. In 1893, Ansonia incorporated as a city, consolidating with the boundaries of the town.

Phelps' business continued to prosper and he accumulated a large fortune. His original partnership with Peck was dissolved in 1832 following the destruction of their New York warehouse (4 May 1832) due to structural failure. Phelps and his son narrowly escaped, but among the dead was Josiah Stokes, a senior clerk who was betrothed to Phelps daughter, Caroline.

This was a terrible blow to Phelps and his family. He reorganized the business, forming the Phelps Dodge Company in 1833 with his sons-in-law William Earl Dodge and Daniel James as partners. The two of them operated the firm's functions in Liverpool, England. In 1839 Phelps made his son Anson G. Phelps, Jr. a partner, with a one-eighth share of the business.

Caroline Phelps eventually married James Boulter Stokes, brother of the dead Josiah. He became the third son-in-law of Phelps to join Phelps, Dodge & Co. as a partner. Stokes was wealthy in his own right. During the 1837 financial crisis, he helped the Phelps, Dodge partnership through a difficult time with a loan.

Phelps' business interests included banking, property, mining, ironworks, shipping, railroads and timber. After the split with Peck, some of these interests were divided between the two men. Others remained in joint partnership, including the New York property portfolio and shipping. Peck, who took over the rolling mill at Haverstraw, would continue to purchase raw materials from Phelps.

== Philanthropic interests ==
Phelps continued to be an active member of the Congregational Church, and he took an interest in a number of philanthropic causes. He contributed generously to the American Bible Society, the American Board of Commissioners for Foreign Missions, the American Home Missionary Society, the Colonization Society, the Blind Asylum of New York City, and served as the president of each at some point during his life.

He also contributed to many other societies and charitable institutions both while he lived and through his estate. He gave his native town of Simsbury, Connecticut US$1000 to aid the poor. Among his other philanthropic activities was the creation of the Anson G. Phelps lecture series on early American history at New York University.

In the 1830s, Phelps supported Presbyterian preacher Charles Grandison Finney during his ministry in New York. Phelps first hired a church for him in Vanderwater Street, and later purchased a church in Princes Street, near Broadway. Finney was "much struck with the piety of Mr Phelps", and said that Phelps would rise at night so that he could commune with God, having little time for secret devotion during the day, when business pressed him.

== Family ==
Phelps married Olivia Egleston, daughter of Elihu and Elizabeth Egleston, on 26 October 1806 at the age of 25. He and Olivia had nine children: Elizabeth, Melissa, Caroline Olivia (died in infancy), and Caroline, all born in Hartford; and Harriett, Anson Green Jr., Olivia Egleston, and Lydia Ann, all born in New York City. His grandsons included Anson Phelps Stokes and William Earl Dodge Stokes. His great-grandson, Anson Phelps Stokes, became a well-known philanthropist. In 1835 Phelps purchased the house of Henry A. Coster and added land to extend the property from Third Avenue to the East River, and from Twenty-ninth to half-way between Thirty-third and Thirty-fourth streets.

Family of Anson Green Phelps

| | | | Anson Green Phelps (1781-1853) m. 1806; Olivia Egleston (1784-1859) |
| Elizabeth Woodbridge Phelps (1807-1847) m. 1829; Daniel James (1801-1876) | Melissa Phelps (1809-1903) m.1828 William Earle Dodge (1805-1883) | Caroline Phelps (1812-1881) m. 1837; James Boulter Stokes (1804–1881) | Harriet Phelps (1815-1892) m.1836 Charles Floyer Pond (1809-1867) | Anson Greene Phelps Jr. (1818-1858) m. 1845; Jane Gibson (1819–1908) | Olivia Egleston Phelps (1821-1894) m. 1847; Benjamin Bakewell Atterbury (1816–1900) | Lydia Ann Phelps (1823-1831) |

== Death and bequests ==
Phelps died at his New York residence, formerly the Coster place, on 30 November 1853 at age 73. He left about two million dollars, of which almost seven hundred thousand was his shares in Phelps Dodge & Co. These were purchased by the other partners. Just over one million dollars was property in New York, Indiana, Connecticut, Pennsylvania and Missouri. His will was contested and there were so many anomalies that his widow, who was the executrix, put it before the courts to sort out. It was after her death that the final verdict was given by the court of appeal in 1861. Due to a technical issue with the wording of the will, one large bequest of $50,000 to the Liberia College was declared void by the courts. However, the family held this bequest to be sacred and the donation stood despite the ruling.

He was eulogized by a Mrs. Sigourney in writing:

The cares of commerce and the rush of wealth Swept not away his meekness, nor the time To cultivate all household charities; Nor the answering, conscientious zeal To consecrate a portion of his gains To man's relief and the Redeemer's cause.

In his will, Phelps left instructions to his heirs in terms that characterized his life:

I give and bequeath to each of my grand-children, living at my decease, the sum of $5,000, to be paid them as they severally attain the age of 21 years. This latter bequest I direct to be accompanied by my executors with this injunction:-That each of my said grand-children shall consider the said bequest as a sacred deposit, committed to their trust, to be invested by each grand-child, and the income derived therefrom to be devoted to spread the gospel, and to promote the Redeemer's kingdom oil earth, hoping and trusting that the God of Heaven will give to each of that wisdom which is from above, and incline them to be faithful stewards, and transmit the same to their descendants, to be sacredly devoted to the same object. I know this bequest is absolute and places the amount so given beyond my control; but my earnest hope is that my wish may be regarded as I leave it, an obligation binding simply on their integrity and honor.

His funeral was at the Presbyterian Church, Mercer Street, New York, where he had been a ruling elder. He was buried in his family vault in the New York Marble Cemetery. He was later re-interred in the Green-Wood Cemetery in Brooklyn.

== See also ==
- Ansonia, Connecticut
