= John Sherman Hoyt =

American philanthropist

John Sherman Hoyt (July 29, 1869 – March 30, 1954) was an American scouter and YMCA co-founder. He was National Council Vice President for Finance and a member of the National Council Executive Board for the Boy Scouts of America. He was on the advisory board for the YMCA. In 1897 he purchased a large Continent Island estate in Tokeneke, Darien, Connecticut. The Darien Scouts used this estate for their summer camps during the 1920s and 1930s and it became known as Treasure Island. In 1926 Hoyt received the Boy Scout Silver Buffalo Award. In 1947 he donated 18 acres of land to the Alfred W. Dater Council, which became the Five Mile River Camp and was thereafter sold. In 1966, 174 acres of the John Sherman Hoyt Reservation was donated and named in his honor. Other roles Hoyt held included national war work council conference member at army post, and a director and board member for the American Car & Foundry Company.
