= Howells & Stokes =

American architectural firm

- Company type: Architecture
- Founded: 1897, New York City
- Founders: John Mead Howells, Isaac Newton Phelps Stokes
- Fate: Dissolved, 1917

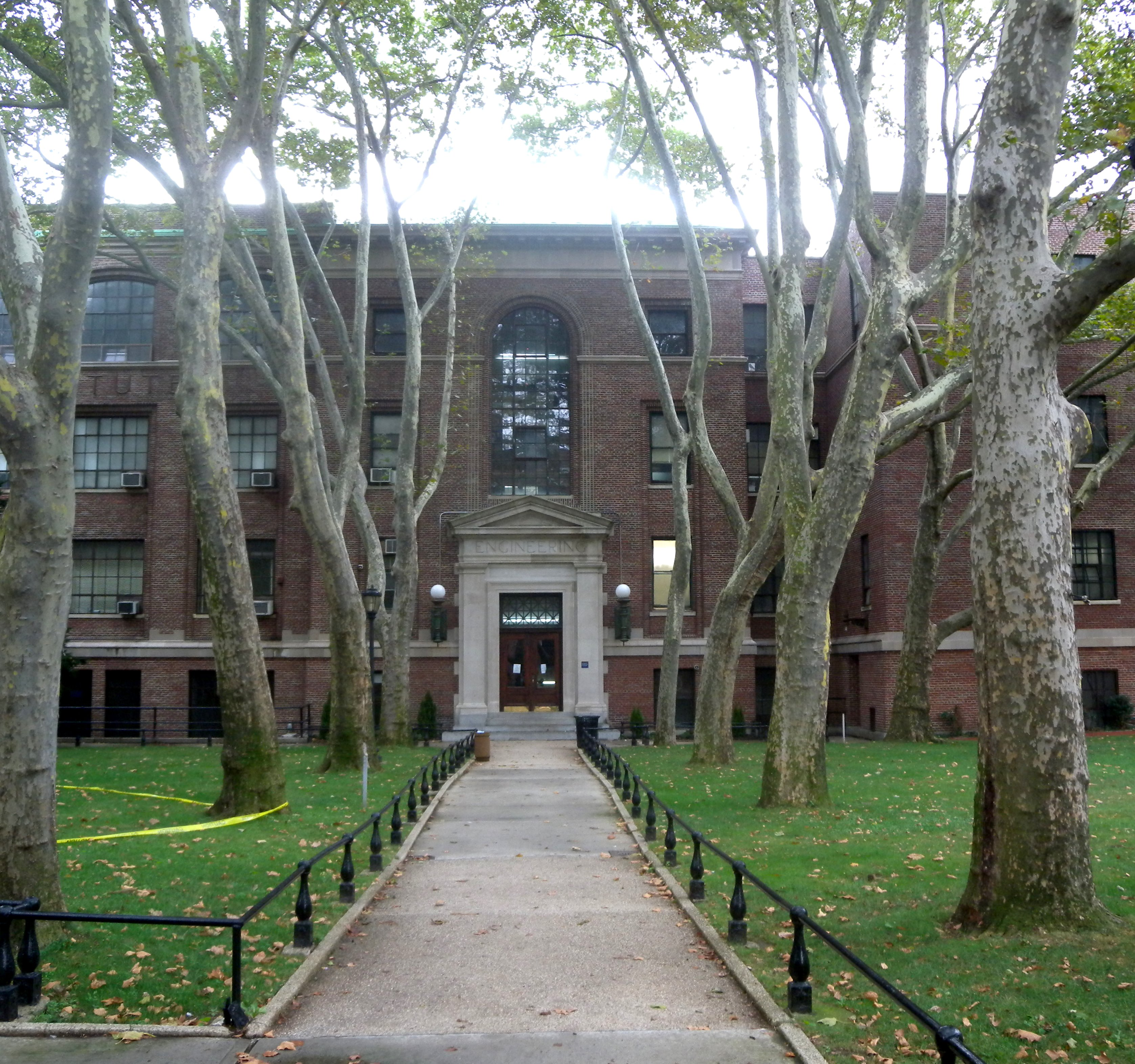
Engineering Building at Pratt Institute

Howells & Stokes was an American architectural firm founded in 1897 by John Mead Howells and Isaac Newton Phelps Stokes. The firm dissolved in 1917.

Howells & Stokes designed, among other structures, St. Paul's Chapel at Columbia University; Woodbridge Hall, part of the Hewitt Quadrangle on the campus of Yale University in New Haven, Connecticut; the Engineering Quadrangle at Pratt Institute; Horace Mann Hall, in collaboration with Edgar A. Josselyn at Teachers College, Columbia University; and office buildings in New York City, Seattle, San Francisco, and Providence, Rhode Island.

The firm was hired to plan the redevelopment of the original downtown Seattle site of the University of Washington. The Metropolitan Tract was, at the time, the largest development of a downtown site undertaken in the United States. Abraham H. Albertson represented the firm in Seattle and supervised construction of the project as well San Francisco's Royal Insurance Building.

Following their earlier close collaboration on these and other projects, the partners chose to pursue separate interests, with Howells primarily engaging in commercial skyscraper construction and Stokes in the design of public housing projects in New York City.

== Selected works ==
- Centennial Hall at Edward Waters College
- Cobb Building (Seattle)
- Engineering Quadrangle at Pratt Institute
- Horace Mann Hall (Teachers College, Columbia University)
- Royal Insurance Building, San Francisco
- St. Paul's Chapel (Columbia University)
- Turk's Head Building
