= James Boulter Stokes =

American businessman

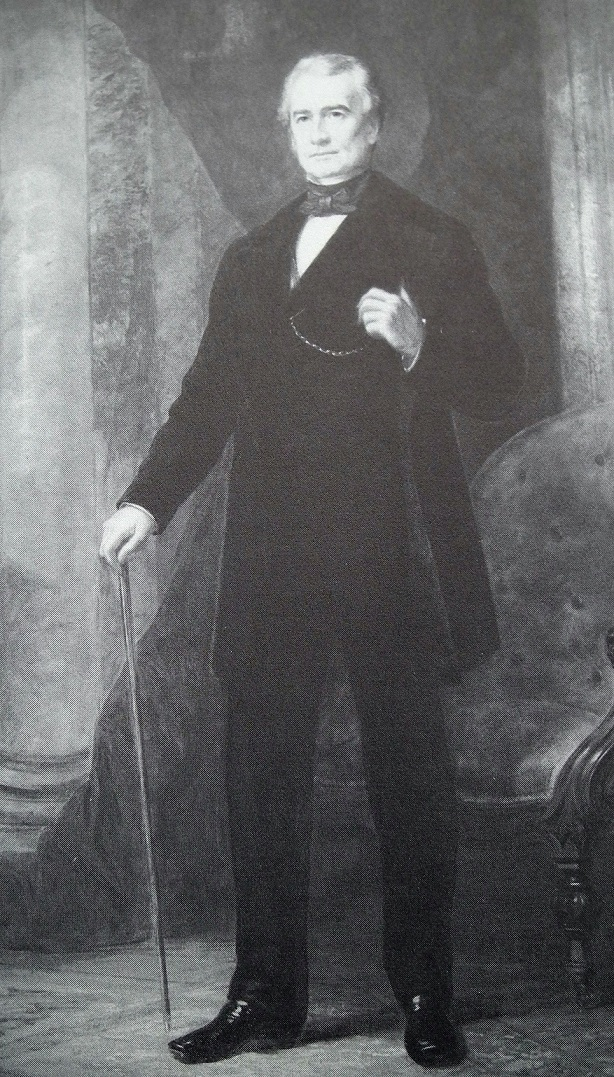
- Born: January 31, 1804; New York City, New York, United States
- Died: August 1, 1881 (aged 77); New York City, New York, U.S.
- Employer: Phelps, Dodge & Co.
- Spouse: Caroline Olivia Phelps (m. 1837; died 1881)
- Children: 10
- Relatives: Edward Stiles Stokes (nephew)

James Boulter Stokes (January 31, 1804 – August 1, 1881) was an American businessman. He was the third son-in-law of Anson Greene Phelps to become a partner in the mercantile business of Phelps, Dodge & Co.

== Early life ==
Stokes's parents, Thomas and Elizabeth (née Boulter) Stokes, emigrated from England to America in 1798. They settled in an area north of New York on the Hudson River near Sing Sing. Financial difficulties forced them to move to New York, where Thomas started businesses importing fine woolen cloth, selling coal and investing in property. Thomas was a religious man and joined the New York Peace Society and the New York Tract Society, becoming acquainted with Anson Greene Phelps and David Low Dodge. He died in 1832 at which time James and his brother Edward Halesworth Stokes took over the businesses.

== Career ==
In 1833, James Boulter Stokes travelled to England and met his maternal grandfather, James Boulter, for the first time. He found the gentleman to be so objectionable that he immediately removed the name Boulter from his own signature and from that time forward was known simply as James Stokes.

Stokes's younger brother, Josiah, worked for Anson Greene Phelps as a confidential clerk. Josiah was betrothed to Phelps's daughter, Caroline, and the intention was for him to become a partner in the business. On May 4, 1832, Josiah was killed when the warehouse he was working in collapsed due to structural failure. Five years later, James married Caroline.

Stokes provided funding for his father-in-law's Phelps, Dodge & Co. business during the 1837 financial crisis when the banks had suspended payments. In 1839, he was in business with the firm of Stokes, Shapter & Walton, importing cloth, and living in England before returning to New York in 1841. In 1847, he was invited to join Phelps, Dodge & Co., holding a 15% share in 1853 and by 1858, a 20% share. He became the first president of the Ansonia Brass & Copper Company, the Ansonia Clock Company, and the Ansonia Land & Water Company. Later two of his sons, Anson Phelps Stokes and Thomas Stokes, joined Phelps, Dodge & Co. Stokes had business interests outside of Phelps, Dodge including the ownership of 38,000 acres of pine land in Michigan.

=== Phelps, Stokes & Co. ===
In 1878, the Stokes family left Phelps, Dodge & Co. and entered a banking business on January 1, 1879. The bank they formed was Phelps, Stokes & Co., 45 Wall Street. The partners were James Stokes, his eldest son Anson Phelps Stokes and Anson's father-in-law Isaac Newton Phelps. Their business included issuing credits on the Union Bank of London and on Melville, Evans & Co., London.

His son closed the banking business after his death in 1881, partly due to the litigation surrounding the elder Stokes' will, and partly because his own health became jeopardized when his eyesight started to fail. He was appointed temporary administrator of his father's estate until the court actions were finally settled.

== Personal life ==
On April 12, 1837, Stokes was married to Caroline Olivia Phelps (1812–1881). After returning from England to New York in 1841, he built a house called Clifton Cottage on the grounds of Anson Phelps's 35-acre estate on the East River, situated between 29th and 31st Streets. Later, he lived at 37 Madison Avenue and in a house situated between the villages of Old Derby and Ansonia. It was originally an Episcopal rectory, enlarged at the rear. Together, Caroline and John were the parents of:

- Anson Phelps Stokes (1838–1913), who married Helen Louise Phelps, a daughter of Isaac Newton Phelps, in 1865.
- Elizabeth James Stokes (1839–1875), who married Francis H. Slade in 1863.
- James Stokes (1840–1841), who died in infancy.
- James Stokes (1841–1918), who married Grace Hartley (1860–1896) in 1882. After her death, he married Florence Brooks Chatfield (1862–1920) in 1905.
- Thomas Stokes (1845–1920), who married Elizabeth Cossitt (1848–1887), daughter of Frederick H. Cossitt. He later married Lillyan Kuenemann.
- Olivia Eggleston Phelps Stokes (1847–1927), a philanthropist who never married.
- Dorothea (Dora) Stokes (1849–1884), who married Henry Martin Dale in 1874.
- Melissa Dodge Stokes (1851–1852), who died in infancy.
- William Earl Dodge Stokes (1852–1926), who married Rita de Acosta in 1895. They divorced and he married Helen Ellwood in 1911.
- Caroline Phelps Stokes (1854–1909), a philanthropist who, like her elder sister Olivia, never married.

Caroline, wife of James Stokes, died on March 9, 1881, and Stokes died shortly after. His daughter Dora (Stokes) Dale and her husband Henry contested the will, and questions were raised about the state of Stokes mind during the final years of his life. Dora died in 1884, but her husband continued the court action after her death, and it was not until 1888 that the courts finally settled the matter. Stokes's son, W. E. D Stokes, who was one of the executors, also took several court actions against his fellow executors. Dale took court action against W. E. D Stokes for the return of shares he had received from his father before his death.

=== Philanthropy ===
Stokes took interest in several organisations including the Association for Improving the Condition of the Poor; Hospital for Ruptured and Crippled; New York Eye and Ear Infirmary; Society for the Prevention of Cruelty to Animals and the Greenwich Savings Bank. He visited Bellevue Hospital and taught Bible class there and gave of his time to several public schools. He supported YMCA and the Young Women's Christian Association. He was offered the nomination for Mayor of New York but declined.

Several charitable organisations benefitted from the will of James Stokes, including American Bible Society; American Home Missionary Society; Union Theological Seminary; Baptist Theological Seminary, Rochester; Baptist Home Missionary Society; American Tract Society; Home for Incurables, West Farms; Society for Ruptured and Crippled; Colored Orphan Asylum; American Board of Commissioners for Foreign Missions; American Baptist Missionary, Union for Burmah and Foreign Missions; Society for the Prevention of Cruelty to Animals.

=== Edward S. Stokes ===
Stokes's nephew, Edward Stiles Stokes, was found guilty of the manslaughter in 1872 of the notorious "robber baron" James Fisk. W. E. D. Stokes had persuaded his father, James Stokes, to contribute towards Edward Stokes's defence costs. Despite this, W. E. D. and his cousin Edward became bitter enemies in later years.
