= Minturn =

Minturn may refer to:

== Geographical locations ==
- Minturn, Arkansas
- Minturn, California
- Minturn, Colorado
- Minturn, Maine
- Minturn, South Carolina

== People ==
- Edith Minturn Stokes (1867-1937), American philanthropist, artistic muse and socialite during the Gilded Age
- Robert Bowne Minturn (1805-1866), American merchant
- Robert Bowne Minturn, Jr. (1836–1889), American shipping magnate

== Other ==
- Grinnell, Minturn & Co., 19th-century shipping company

== See also ==
- Minturno
