= Mr. and Mrs. I. N. Phelps Stokes =

Painting by John Singer Sargent

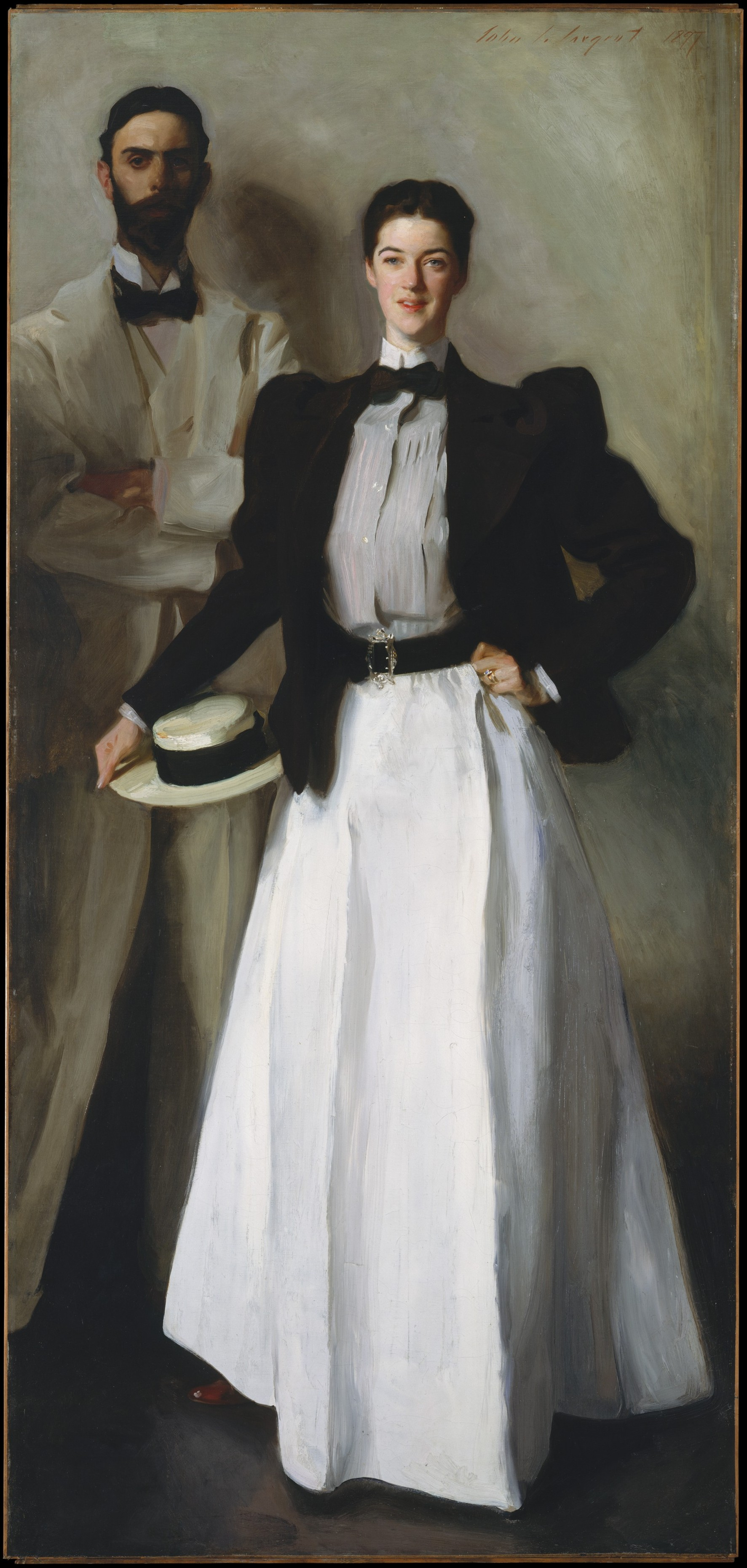
- Mr. and Mrs. I. N. Phelps Stokes
- Artist: John Singer Sargent
- Year: 1897
- Medium: oil on canvas
- Dimensions: 214 cm × 101 cm (84 in × 40 in)
- Location: Metropolitan Museum of Art; New York City, New York, United States

Mr. and Mrs. I. N. Phelps Stokes is an 1897 painting by American painter John Singer Sargent. It is part of the collection of the Metropolitan Museum of Art.

The portrait depicts the New York architect and philanthropist Isaac Newton Phelps Stokes (1867–1944) and his wife, Edith Minturn Stokes (1867–1937), whom he married in 1895, and had previously posed for Daniel Chester French's Statue of The Republic that was featured at the World's Columbian Exposition.

The portrait was commissioned as a wedding gift for the couple and originally planned to feature Edith alone in evening wear. It was then changed to Edith in day wear posing next to a Great Dane. The dog became unavailable, and Isaac stood in its place.

== See also ==
- List of works by John Singer Sargent
