= Henry Walton Grinnell =

- Portrait from Grinnell's 1920 obituary in the Boston Daily Globe
- Nickname: "Mikado's Yankee Admiral"
- Born: Henry Walton Grinnell; 19 November 1843; New York City, New York
- Died: 2 September 1920 (aged 76) St. Augustine, Florida
- Allegiance: United States of America; Empire of Japan; Republic of Ecuador
- Branch: United States Navy; Imperial Japanese Navy; Ecuadorian Navy
- Service years: 1861-1868, 1898-1899 (United States); 1868-1895 (Japan); 1871-1872 (Ecuador)
- Rank: Lieutenant (United States); Vice admiral (Japan)
- Conflicts: American Civil War • Capture of New Orleans • Battle of Mobile Bay • Carolinas campaign First Sino-Japanese War • Battle of the Yalu River; Spanish–American War • USS Iowa
- Awards: Mentioned in dispatches

Henry Walton Grinnell (November 19, 1843 – September 2, 1920) was an American naval officer who served in the American Civil War and Spanish–American War. He was Inspector General of the Imperial Japanese Navy from 1868 to 1870, retaining the rank of rear admiral through victory in the First Sino-Japanese War. Working in tandem with other foreign experts, Grinnell was credited with modernizing the Japanese navy in the late 19th century.

== Early life and career ==
Grinnell's father, Henry Grinnell, was a prominent maritime merchant as partner in Grinnell, Minturn & Co, one of the largest transatlantic shipping companies of the mid-19th century. The elder Grinnell financed multiple efforts to discover the fate of the lost 1845 British expedition to the Northwest Passage.

Grinnell, enrolled as a student at the Free Academy of the City of New York, was prompted to enlist after Fort Sumter was bombarded in April 1861.

== Naval service ==
=== American Civil War ===
Grinnell's early action focused on enforcing coastal blockade against Confederate states in the Gulf of Mexico. He was praised in the report of Captain Francis Ellison for engaging hostile forts at Pensacola while aboard USS Richmond on November 22, 1861, and also by Brigadier General Thomas E.G. Ransom for leading a two-howitzer landing party from USS Monongahela in the capture of Port Aransas, Texas in late 1863.

Grinnell fought under Admiral David Farragut and Lieutenant Commander Lewis Kimberly at the Capture of New Orleans as well as the Battle of Mobile Bay. Grinnell eventually became the Acting Master of the USS Nyack.

Grinnell was especially well-regarded for delivering encrypted dispatches from Brigadier General John Schofield to Major General William Tecumseh Sherman, informing Sherman that supply lines had been opened by Union control of the port at Wilmington, North Carolina. This entailed paddling a dugout twelve miles up the Cape Fear River, until Confederate pickets forced Grinnell and his party to continue on foot through the Green Swamp - eight days of reconnaissance from Wilmington to Fayetteville, spanning March 4–12, 1865.

=== Officer and advisor in foreign navies ===
While deployed with the Asiatic Squadron aboard USS Susquehanna, Grinnell declined promotion, instead accepting a commission in the Imperial Japanese Navy. Grinnell was initially assigned to develop curriculum for naval cadets before being appointed Inspector General. Following travels through Joseon and Manchuria, Grinnell was recorded as a naval advisor to Ecuador.

Having kept his Japanese commission despite years abroad, Grinnell was present at the Battle of the Yalu River, after which he was honorably discharged with the rank of vice admiral.

=== Spanish-American War ===
Grinnell served as a volunteer lieutenant aboard the USS Iowa during hostilities with Spain.

== Other endeavors ==
Grinnell shared his father's interest in Arctic exploration. In late 1881, he offered to raise $40,000 as the organizing secretary for British Royal Navy Commander John Powles Cheyne's plan to fly via hydrogen balloon to the North Pole, but the idea was widely ridiculed and failed to attract sufficient financial support. Cheyne would have named the expedition vessel after Grinnell.

== Personal life ==
Grinnell's elder sister, Sylvia, married William Fitzherbert Ruxton, who became an admiral in the British Royal Navy. Through this marriage, Grinnell was the uncle of anthropologist Sylvia Leith-Ross.

Grinnell was married to Louisa Platt from 1874 until her death in Providence, Rhode Island on October 26, 1904. Their son, Henry Grinnell (1875-1936), was a forester who served as acting Chief of Forest Products and "inspector of experiments in wood preservation" with the Bureau of Forestry and its successor agency, the United States Forest Service. The junior Henry later managed lumber properties in Asheville, North Carolina.

On July 25, 1910, 66-year-old Grinnell married 25-year-old Florence Roche, the daughter of Grinnell's late friend James Jeffrey Roche, a Boston-based poet, journalist, and diplomat. In his St. Augustine retirement, Grinnell belonged to a social club of ex-military notables cultivated by Union Army Brigadier General Martin Davis Hardin. Grinnell died on September 2, 1920 in St. Augustine, Florida. He was buried in Arlington National Cemetery.

Grinnell was an adult convert to Roman Catholicism.
