= Moses H. Grinnell (pilot boat) =

Sandy Hook Pilot boat

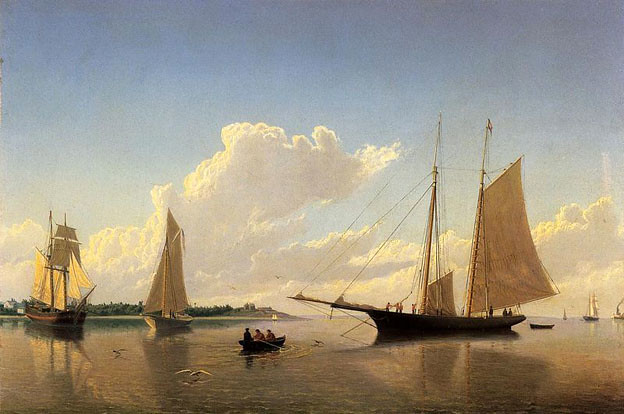
- Schooner Moses H. Grinnell in Stowing Sails off Fairhaven by William Bradford, 1858.

History

United States
- Name: Moses H. Grinnell
- Namesake: Moses H. Grinnell
- Owner: N. Y. Pilots, J. B. Lockman (1876-1879, H. L. Gurney (1881-1882), William Bazzell (1883-1900)
- Builder: Grinnell, Minturn & Co
- Cost: $8,000
- Launched: 1850
- Out of service: August 15, 1914
- Fate: Sold

General characteristics
- Class & type: schooner
- Tonnage: 88 TM
- Length: 73 ft 6 in (22.40 m)
- Beam: 18 ft 9 in (5.72 m)
- Draft: 9 ft 3 in (2.82 m)
- Depth: 7 ft 2 in (2.18 m)
- Propulsion: Sail
- Notes: Used log rails instead of bulwarks

The Moses H. Grinnell was a 19th-century pilot boat built in 1850 for the New York maritime pilots. She was designed by the yacht designer George Steers. The Grinnell was the first pilot boat to feature a fully developed concave clipper-bow, which was to become the New York schooner-rigged pilot boat's trade mark. This new design was the basis for the celebrated yacht America.

== Construction and service ==
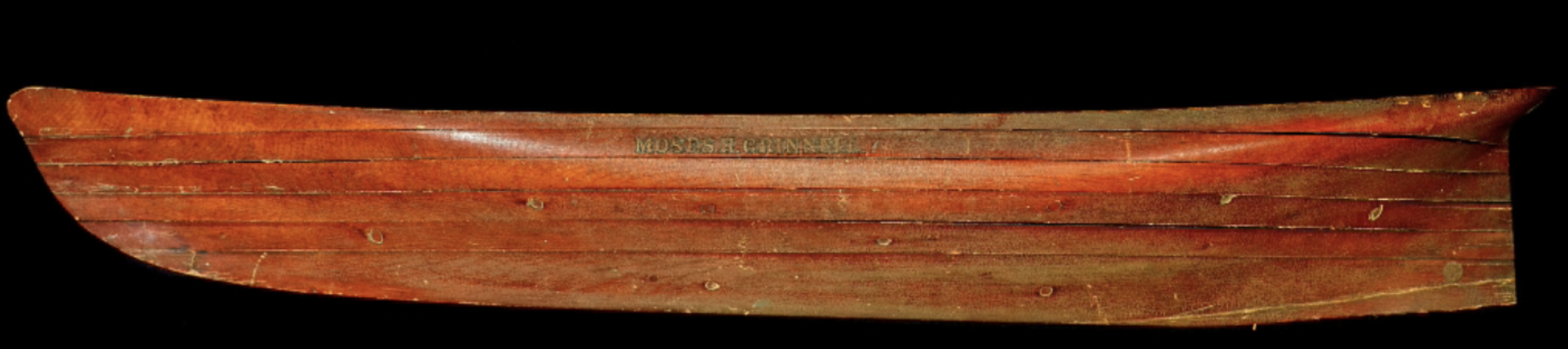
Moses H. Grinnell Half Model made by George Steers.

Moses H. Grinnell, a native of New Bedford, Massachusetts, commissioned George Steers to design a vessel for use as a pilot-boat and as a yacht for pleasure trips. Grinnell was a partner with his brother, Joseph Grinnell, in the shipping firm Grinnell, Minturn & Co. The Grinnell was built in 1850 for the New York pilots and owned by George W. Blunt of New York.

There is a Steers' half-model of the Grinnell is in the Mariners' Museum and Park at Newport News, Virginia, and the boat's profile in John Willis Griffiths Treatise on the Theory and Practice of Shipbuilding.

The Grinnell was the first sailing vessel to have the very long, sharp, and concave clipper-bow that became the prototype for the famous racing yacht, America.

On May 2, 1851, the Grinnell, was in a race with the yacht Cornelia for a purse of $1,000. They started at Stapleton Dock, Staten Island, passed the Sandy Hook point, around the Sandy Hook lightship and back to Stapleton Dock. The Grinnell was the winner.

In August 1852, William Smith and Isaac Gaynor of the pilot boat Moses H. Grinnell were picked up by the schooner Fremont, after being lost in a fog, when putting a pilot on board the ship George Canning.

In 1860, the Moses H. Grinnell was one of the twenty-one New York pilot boats. The boat number "1" was painted as a large number on her mainsail, that identified the boat as belonging to the Sandy Hook Pilots. On October 10, 1860, New York Sandy Hook Pilot Thomas Morley, of the pilot boat Moses H. Grinnell, No. 1, signed a statement along with other pilots, that he was satisfied with the representation he had received from the New York Board of Commissioners of Pilots.

=== American civil war ===
In late October, 1863, during the American Civil War, the seven year old Grinnell, No. 1, was run down in the dark by the United States supply steamer Union on the Outer Middle Ground in Long Island Sound. The Grinnell carried no boat light when struck by the Union. No one was injured in the incident.

On August 11, 1864, the Grinnell reported that they saw a vessel burning off Montauk, New York. The pilots believed that the CSS Tallahassee was working her way toward Nantucket Shoals.

In 1871, the Grinnell collided with two barques near The Battery and was damaged, ran ashore and filled with water.

The Record of American and Foreign Shipping from 1876 to 1879, lists the Grinnell as still being owned by the New York pilots. Captain J. B. Lockman was the master.

=== Boston pilots ===
The Record of American and Foreign Shipping from 1881 to 1882, lists the Grinnell as being owned by the Boston pilots with Captain H. L. Gurney as the master.

=== Pensacola, Florida ===
On October 24, 1882, the Grinnell, was sold to the Pensacola, Florida pilots for $4,500. This was the third pilot-boat that was purchased from the Boston pilots. She was listed as No. 9, of the Boston fleet.

The Record of American and Foreign Shipping from 1883 to 1900, lists the Grinnell registered with Captain William Bazzell and her owner was Charles McKenzie Oerting & Co. Her home port was Pensacola, Florida.

The Pensacola News, reported that on May 16, 1896, the pilot boat Moses H. Grinnell, was for sale at a sacrifice by the Pensacola Pilot's Association. The reason for sale was that the association had a steam pilot boat.

== End of service ==
The Bar Pilot's Association sold the Moses H. Grinnell on August 15, 1914, to British subjects from Montego Bay, Jamaica. The sale was confirmed in a letter from the US Vice-consul at Kingston, Jamaica, on October 21, 1914.

== See also ==
- List of Northeastern U. S. Pilot Boats
