= Moses H. Grinnell =

United States Congressman

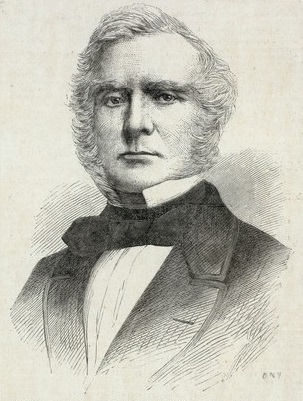
- Grinnell as Collector of the Port of New York in 1869

19th Collector of the Port of New York
- In office 1869–1870
- Appointed by: Ulysses S. Grant
- Preceded by: Henry A. Smythe
- Succeeded by: Thomas Murphy

Member of the U.S. House of Representatives from New York's 3rd district
- In office March 4, 1839 – March 3, 1841
- Preceded by: Churchill C. Cambreleng
- Succeeded by: Charles G. Ferris

Personal details
- Born: March 3, 1803 New Bedford, Massachusetts, U.S.
- Died: November 24, 1877 (aged 74) New York City, New York, U.S.
- Resting place: Sleepy Hollow Cemetery
- Party: Whig
- Relations: Joseph Grinnell (brother)
- Parent(s): Cornelius Grinnell and Sylvia (née Howland

Moses Hicks Grinnell (March 3, 1803 – November 24, 1877) was a shipper and businessman. He became a United States Congressman representing New York, and a Commissioner of New York City's Central Park.

== Early life ==
Grinnell was born in New Bedford, Massachusetts, on March 3, 1803. He was the son of Cornelius Grinnell (1758–1850) and Sylvia (née Howland) Grinnell (1765–1837). His siblings included Henry Grinnell and Joseph Grinnell.

After attending public school, he took his first paying job at the age of 15, working in the counting room of a bank in New York City.

== Shipping career ==
In 1815, his brother Joseph Grinnell helped to establish the shipping firm Grinnell, Minturn & Co. Moses and his brother, Henry Grinnell, became members of the firm in 1825. In 1830, Robert Bowne Minturn joined the firm and it became Grinnell & Minturn. The company stayed active until 1880.

Grinnell became a successful New York merchant and shipper and was subsequently appointed as president of the New York Chamber of Commerce. The pilot boat Moses H. Grinnell, was built in 1850 for the Jersey pilots and designed by George Steers. She was owned by George W. Blunt of New York. The Grinnell was the first pilot boat to show the fully developed long entry that was to become the New York schooner's trade mark.

The shipping company is best known for owning the clipper ship Flying Cloud. Grinnell bought her from Donald McKay in 1851 for $90,000 (~$2.69 million in 2024).

== Political career ==
However, unlike his brother Joseph Grinnell, who represented Massachusetts for four terms as a Whig, Moses did not stick to a single political party. He was first a Democrat, then became a Whig in the 1830s, was an "out-and-out Native American party man" the 1840s, and in the 1850s joined the newly founded Republican Party, for which he served as a presidential elector in 1856.

In February 1860, president-elect Abraham Lincoln, on his way to Washington, D.C., visited the Manhattan home of Grinnell's daughter, whose father had invited many of New York City's most prominent businessmen to meet the first Republican president. Grinnell subsequently wrote Lincoln with introductions for others, becoming something of a conduit of political power, if not a wielder of such himself.

Grinnell was Collector of the Port of New York from March 1869 to July 1870, and the Port's Naval Officer of Customs from July 1870 to April 1871. Perhaps best remembered for his work as Central Park Commissioner during the early years of the urban park's design and construction. A street in the Bronx borough of New York City is named in his honor.

== Personal life ==
Moses Grinnell died in Manhattan on November 24, 1877. His funeral service was at the Unitarian Church of All Souls and he was buried in Sleepy Hollow Cemetery, Sleepy Hollow, New York.

U.S. House of Representatives
Preceded by Churchill C. Cambreleng	Member of the U.S. House of Representatives from New York's 3rd congressional district 1839–1841	Succeeded by Charles G. Ferris
Government offices
Preceded by Henry A. Smythe	Collector of the Port of New York; 1869–1870	Succeeded by Thomas Murphy
