= John Wendell =

John Wendell may refer to:

- John Wendell (American football) (1885–1962), American football player
- John Lansing Wendell (1785–1861), American judge
- Captain John Wendell (died c. 1638), English merchant sailor who led the first English expedition to China

== See also ==
- Johnathan Wendel (born 1981), electronic sports player
