= John Lansing =

John Lansing may refer to:

- John Lansing Jr. (1754–1829), founding father of the United States, attorney, politician andjurist
- John Lansing (journalist) (1957–2024), American journalist and media executive

== See also ==
- John Lansing Wendell (1785–1861), American judge.
