= Henry Grinnell =

American merchant and philanthropist (1799–1874)

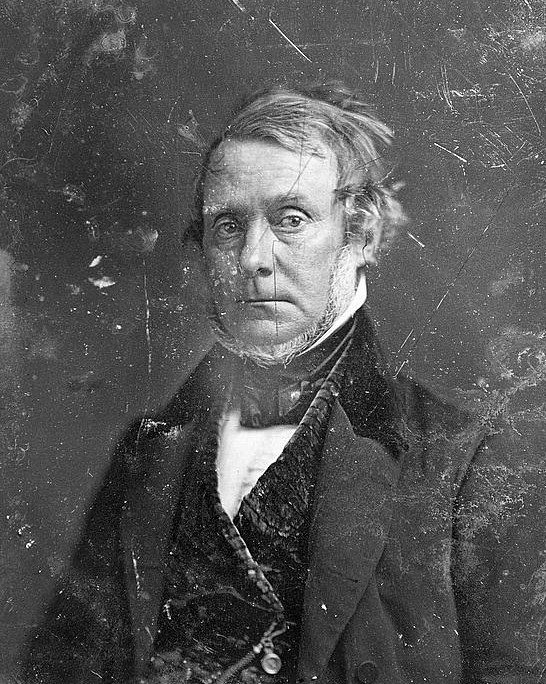
- Born: February 18, 1799; New Bedford, Massachusetts, US
- Died: June 30, 1874 (aged 75); New York City, US
- Resting place: Green-Wood Cemetery
- Occupation: Merchant
- Employer: Grinnell, Minturn & Co.
- Known for: Sponsor of Arctic exploration
- Spouse: Sarah Minturn (m. 1822)
- Children: 9, including Henry
- Relatives: Joseph Grinnell (brother); Moses Hicks Grinnell (brother); Robert Bowne Minturn (brother-in-law)

Henry Grinnell (February 18, 1799 – June 30, 1874) was an American merchant and philanthropist.

== Early life ==
Grinnell was born in New Bedford, Massachusetts, on February 18, 1799. He was the son of Cornelius Grinnell and Sylvia (née Howland) Grinnell. His siblings included Joseph Grinnell and Moses Hicks Grinnell.

After graduating from the New Bedford Academy, Grinnell moved to New York City in 1818, where he became a clerk in the commission house of H.D. & E.B. Sewell.

== Career ==
In 1825, Henry joined his older brother Joseph (who later served as member of the U.S. House of Representatives for Massachusetts) and Preserved Fish in Fish, Grinnell & Company. A few years later, with the addition of Henry's brother-in-law, Robert Bowne Minturn, the firm became Grinnell, Minturn & Company, whose operations were greatly expanded by its entry into the general shipping business.

The company became one of the strongest and best known mercantile houses in New York City.

=== Arctic exploration ===
Henry Grinnell retired in 1850, around the time that he became very interested in the fate of the lost Franklin Polar Expedition. For the remainder of his life he corresponded regularly with Lady Jane Franklin and others interested in solving the mystery, as well as promoting and funding several expeditions.

The first of these expeditions was in 1850, when he purchased and loaned to the United States Navy the brigs Rescue and Advance to search the Arctic under the overall command of Lieutenant Edwin De Haven. After these vessels returned unsuccessful, he funded a second expedition with the Advance under Elisha Kent Kane which explored the region named Grinnell Land off the north-western coast of Greenland between 1853 and 1855, when the vessel, hopelessly beset in the ice, was abandoned.

In 1856, Grinnell was instrumental in having the recently salvaged HMS Resolute restored at the expense of the United States government, and returned to Great Britain as a good-will gesture. This was partly in the hope that the vessel would be used for a further search for the Franklin expedition.

On later occasions, Grinnell manifested his unabated interest in polar exploration by contributing to the voyage of Isaac Israel Hayes in 1860, and the three expeditions of Charles Francis Hall between 1860 and 1870. He was also a regular correspondent with the writer and unsuccessful explorer William Parker Snow.

Henry Grinnell was also one of the founders, and the first president, of the American Geographical and Statistical Society. In 1853, he was elected as a member to the American Philosophical Society.

== Personal life ==
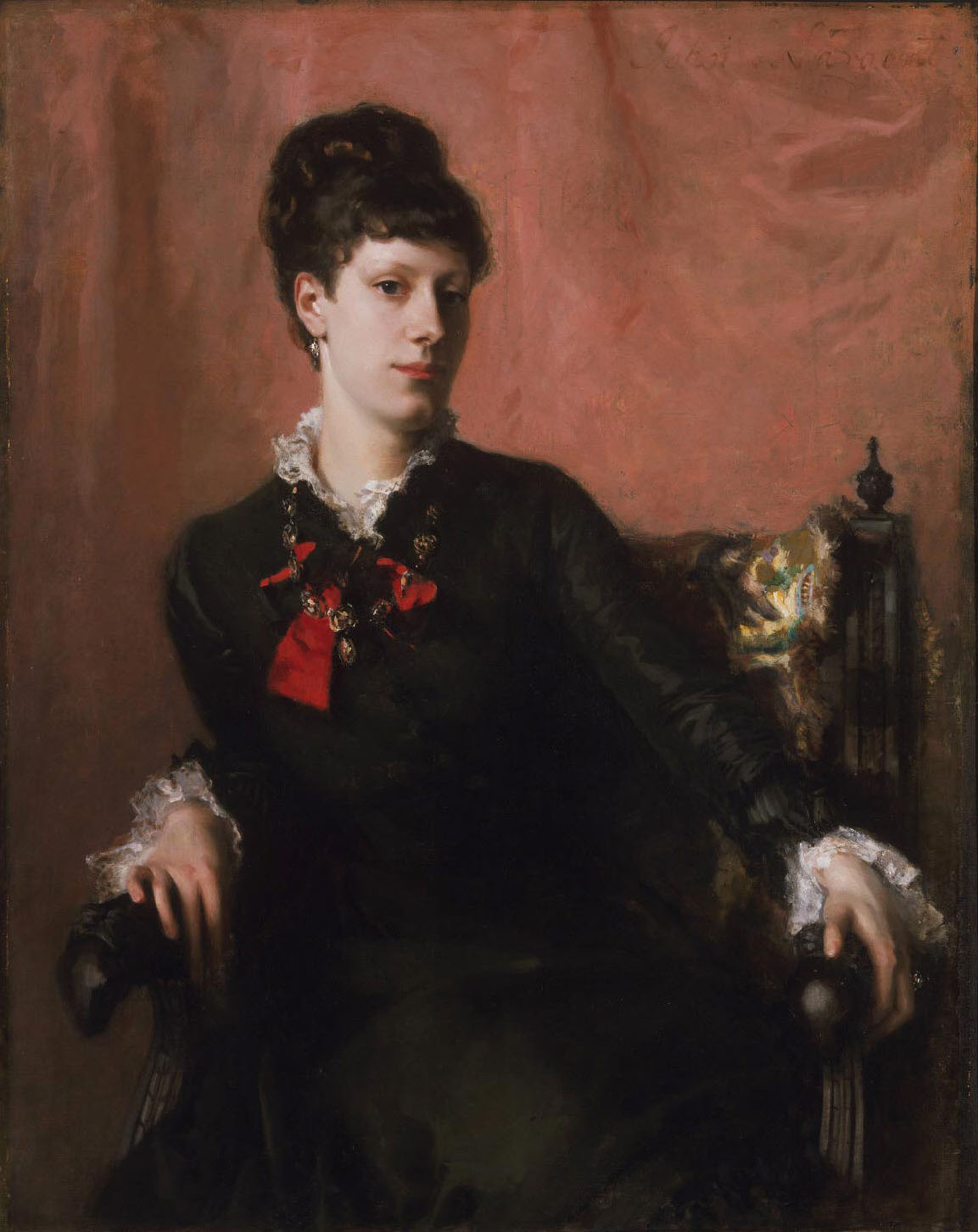
Portrait of Fanny Watts. Grinnell's granddaughter, Frances Sherborne Ridley Watts, by John Singer Sargent, 1877

On June 12 1822, Grinnell married Sarah Minturn, the daughter of William Minturn Jr. and Sarah (née Bowne) Minturn from the prominent merchant and shipping family. They had nine children, including Henry Walton Grinnell (1843–1920), who had a distinguished naval career.

Grinnell died on June 30 1874 and was buried at Green-Wood Cemetery in Brooklyn, New York. In 1880, the British Government presented his widow with a lady's desk made from timbers from the recently demolished HMS Resolute. This was not the Resolute desk, but a companion desk made from other timbers from the same vessel.

Through his daughter Sylvia, he was the grandfather of Sylvia Leith-Ross, wan anthropologist and writer who worked in Nigeria.
