= Edith Minturn Stokes =

American philanthropist

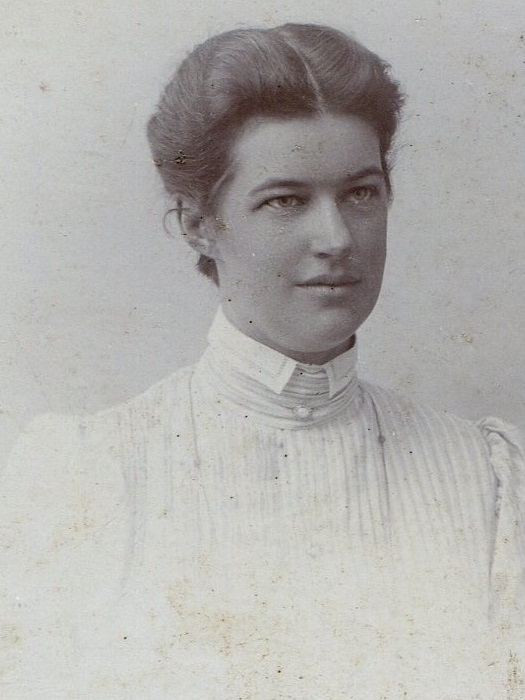
- Born: Edith Minturn; June 20, 1867; West Brighton, Richmond County, New York (state), U.S.
- Died: June 12, 1937 (aged 69); Manhattan, New York City, U.S.
- Spouse: Isaac Newton Phelps Stokes (m. 1895)
- Children: Helen Phelps Stokes (adopted daughter)
- Parent(s): Robert Bowne Minturn Jr. Suzannah Shaw
- Relatives: Robert Bowne Minturn (paternal grandfather); Robert Gould Shaw (maternal uncle); Henry Dwight Sedgwick (brother-in-law); Amos Pinchot (brother-in-law); Rosamond Pinchot (niece); Edie Sedgwick (grand-niece)

Edith Minturn Stokes (June 20, 1867 – June 12, 1937) was an American philanthropist, artistic muse and socialite during the Gilded Age.

== Early life and family background ==
Edith Minturn was born on June 20, 1867, in West Brighton, Staten Island, New York. She was the third child and second daughter of the shipping magnate Robert Bowne Minturn Jr. (1836-1889) and his wife Susannah Shaw (1839-1926). The Minturn family was well connected both politically, and with other prominent families via marriage. Her uncle, Robert Gould Shaw, was killed while commanding the nation’s first all-black regiment.

Minturn was educated at home, with music and French lessons, and went on a Grand Tour of Europe, as was expected of society women.

Minturn had several siblings. Her brother Robert Shaw Minturn married Bertha Howard Potter, granddaughter of Bishop Alonzo Potter, niece of Henry Codman Potter, and great-granddaughter of Eliphalet Nott. Her sister Sarah May Minturn married Henry Dwight Sedgwick. They were grandparents of Edie Sedgwick and great-grandparents of Kyra Sedgwick. Their son Robert Minturn Sedgwick married Helen Peabody, daughter of Endicott Peabody. Her sister Mildred Scott married Arthur Hugh Scott, the headmaster of a French boarding school for boys. They eventually relocated to England. Her sister Gertrude Minturn married Amos Richard Eno Pinchot. They had two children, one of whom, Rosamond Pinchot, was an actress famed mostly for her great beauty.

== Philanthropy and artistic muse ==
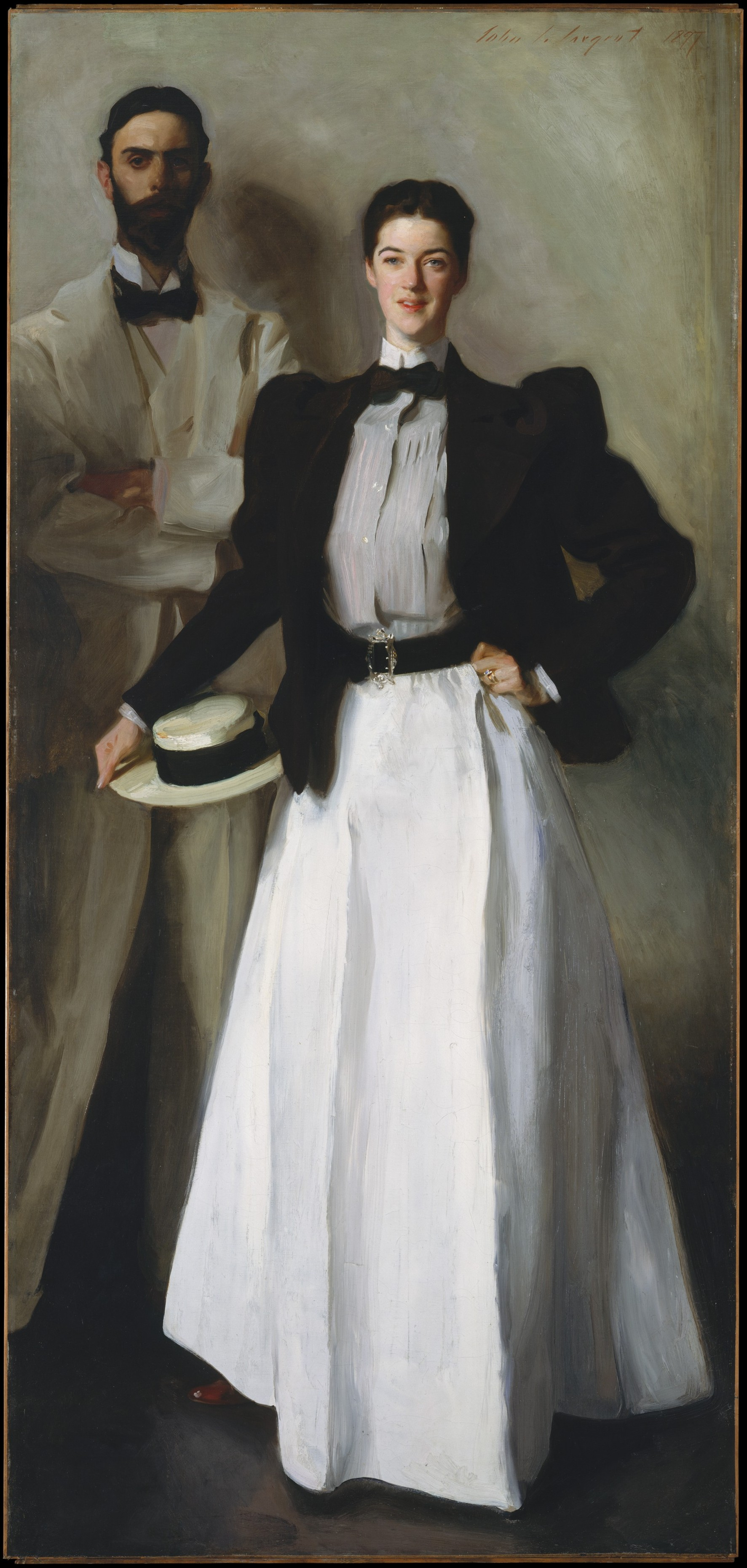
Mr. and Mrs. I. N. Phelps Stokes, by John Singer Sargent, 1897)

She was the President of the New York Kindergarten Association, ran a sewing school for immigrant women, and was a benefactor of St. George's Church in New York City.

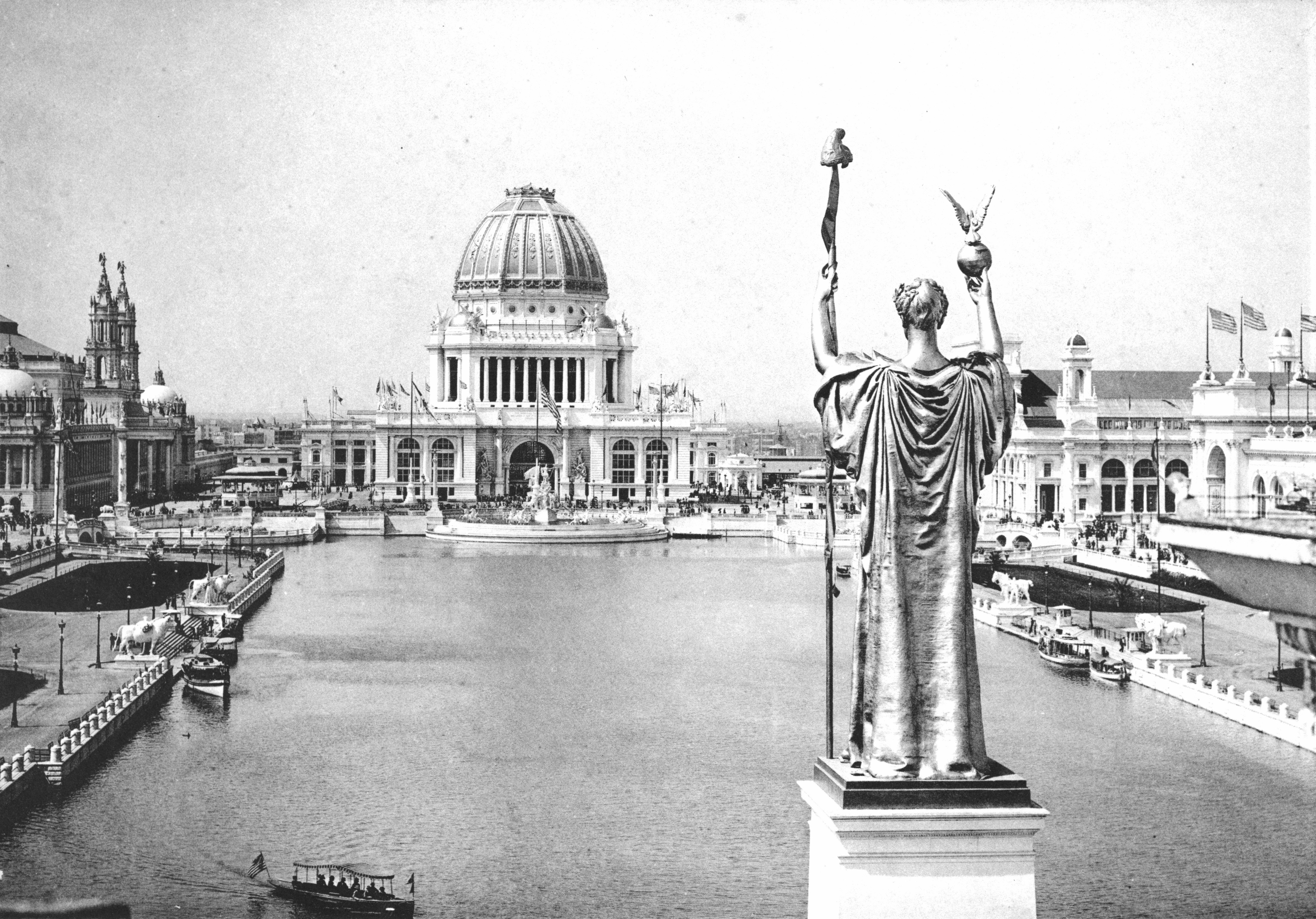
Daniel Chester French's original statue The Republic at the World's Columbian Exposition of 1893 in Chicago

Edith Minturn Stokes began modelling by participating in the then popular pastime known as tableaux vivants; she was spotted at these and became a model for Daniel Chester French in his Greenwich Village atelier.

So it was that she posed for his sculpture The Republic, which was a centerpiece of the Court of Honor of the Columbian Exposition of 1893 in Chicago. It was a 65-foot-high (20 m) plaster statue covered in gold leaf, and with an illuminated crown. The sculpture was decommissioned and deliberately destroyed in 1896 and the sculptor was commissioned to produce a smaller version, the Statue of the Republic, a 24-foot-tall (7.3 m) gilded bronze sculpture that was erected in 1918 and still stands.

Peter Marié accumulated a collection of watercolor-on-ivory miniatures of society beauties, and she was one of those he selected. These are now on display at the New-York Historical Society Museum.

John Singer Sargent’s portrait Mr. and Mrs. I. N. Phelps Stokes is on display in the American Wing of the Metropolitan Museum of Art.

== Personal life ==
On 25 August 1895, at Pointe-á-Pic, Quebec, she married Isaac Newton Phelps Stokes (1867-1944).

The couple had no biological children, but in 1908 adopted a 3 year old girl, Helen, a daughter of Raj Lieutenant Colonel Maldion Byron Bicknell and his wife Mildred Bax-Ironside, who did not want to raise children in India, where they were stationed. Helen married twice, first in 1928 to Edwin Katte Merrill, a lumber speculator from Bangor, Maine, and had two daughters and two sons. Her second husband was Donald Bush. Helen died in 2004.

Edith suffered from a series of strokes in late life, and died on June 12, 1937, in her home at 953 Fifth Avenue, New York City.
