= Joseph Grinnell (politician) =

American politician

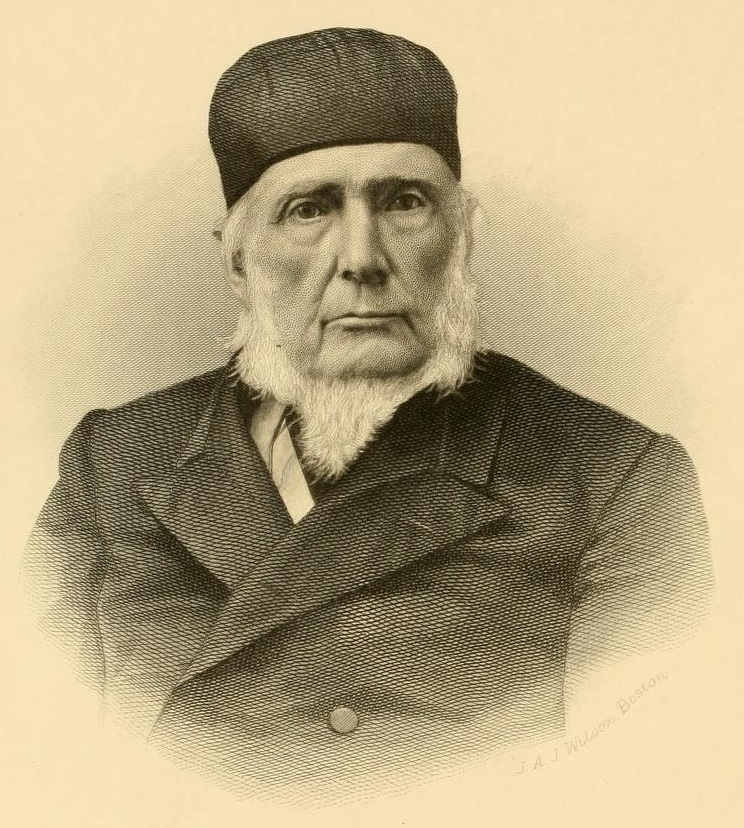

Member of the U.S. House of Representatives from Massachusetts's 10th district
- In office December 7, 1843 – March 3, 1851
- Preceded by: Barker Burnell
- Succeeded by: Zeno Scudder

Personal details
- Born: November 17, 1788 New Bedford, Massachusetts, US
- Died: February 7, 1885 (aged 96) New Bedford, Massachusetts, US
- Party: Whig
- Spouse: Sarah Russell (died 1865)
- Relations: Moses H. Grinnell (brother); Henry Grinnell (brother)
- Occupation: Merchant, banker, railroad executive

Joseph Grinnell (November 17, 1788 – February 7, 1885) was an American politician and businessman who was a U.S. representative from Massachusetts. He was a friend of Abraham Lincoln, and the brother of Moses Hicks Grinnell.

== Early life ==
Grinnell was born in New Bedford, Massachusetts on November 17, 1788. He was the son of Cornelius Grinnell (1758–1850) and Sylvia (née Howland) Grinnell (1765–1837). His siblings included Henry Grinnell and Moses Hicks Grinnell.

After completing preparatory studies he moved to New York City in 1809, where he engaged in mercantile pursuits.

== Career ==
In 1815, he aided in establishing the firm of Fish and Grinnell, which later became Grinnell, Minturn & Co. His two younger brothers, Moses and Henry Grinnell, became members of the firm in 1825. When Joseph retired in 1828, his place was taken by Robert B. Minturn.

He served as president of the First National Bank of New Bedford in 1832, president of the New Bedford & Taunton Railroad in 1839, and a member of the Governor's council from 1839-1841.

In 1840, he became a director of the Boston & Providence Railroad, the following year its president, resigning that position in 1846, but remaining a director until 1863. He also served as president of the Wamsutta Mills from 1847 until 1885.

=== Public office ===
Grinnell was elected as a Whig to the Twenty-eighth Congress to fill the vacancy caused by the death of Barker Burnell. He was reelected to the Twenty-ninth, Thirtieth, and Thirty-first Congresses and served from December 7, 1843, to March 3, 1851. He declined to be a candidate for renomination in 1850. After serving in Congress, he resumed his former business activities.

== Personal life ==
Grinnell was married to Sarah Russell (1788–1862), the daughter of Abraham and Sarah (née Schumacher) Russell. Joseph lived in New Bedford for fifty-six years, often traveling to Europe.

His niece and adopted daughter Cornelia Grinnell married the poet N.P. Willis.

He died in New Bedford, Massachusetts, February 7, 1885 and was interred in Oak Grove Cemetery.

== Notes ==
U.S. House of Representatives
Preceded by Barker Burnell	Member of the U.S. House of Representatives from Massachusetts's 10th congressional district December 7, 1843 – March 3, 1851	Succeeded by Zeno Scudder
