= Preserved Fish =

American businessman (1766–1846)

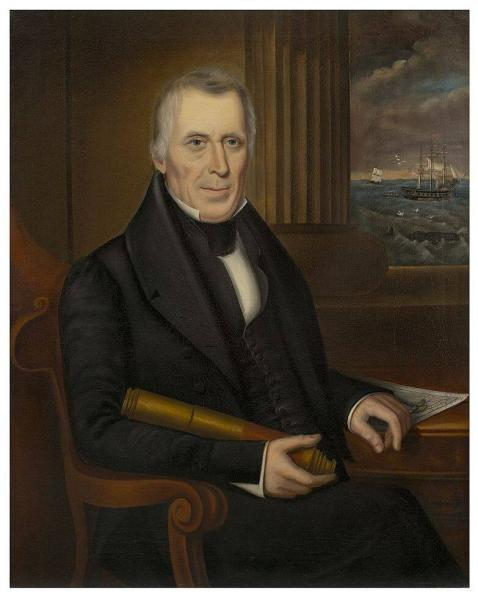
- Portrait, c. 1830
- Born: July 14, 1766; Freetown, Massachusetts Bay, British America
- Died: July 23, 1846 (aged 80); New York City, U.S.
- Resting place: New York City Marble Cemetery
- Occupation: Merchant
- Employer: Fish & Grinnell

Preserved Fish (/prəˈzɜːrvɪd/ prə-ZUR-vid; July 14, 1766 – July 23, 1846) was an American businessman who was a prominent New York City shipping merchant in the early 19th century. He was an early broker of the New York Stock & Exchange Board.

== Early life and education ==
Preserved Fish was born in Freetown, Province of Massachusetts Bay, to blacksmith Isaac Fish and Ruth Grinnell Fish. His extended family, prominent in New York, later gave rise to Secretary of State Hamilton Fish and railroad magnate Stuyvesant Fish. He was descended from Thomas Fish, who settled in New England in 1643. There were at least ten other Fish family members with the Quaker given name Preserved, whose lineages are often confused. The name is pronounced with three syllables: /prəˈzɜːrvɪd/ or /prəˈsɜːrvɪd/; it refers to being "preserved (saved) from sin".

As a youth, Fish shipped to the Pacific on a whaler, becoming its captain at the age of 21. He soon realized that fortune lay in selling whale oil, not in harvesting it.

== Career ==
Fish prospered as a merchant in New Bedford, Massachusetts, but had a political squabble and left for New York. He, along with Joseph Grinnell, controlled a potent shipping firm named Fish & Grinnell – later Grinnell, Minturn & Co – which had its beginnings in his efforts to expand his whale oil market. In 1812, he became a director of Bank of America (unrelated to the current institution), founded after the charter of the First Bank of the United States was not renewed. He also was one of the 28 brokers of the New York Exchange Board, which later became the New York Stock Exchange.

After his resignation from Fish & Grinnell and a brief retirement from business, he served from 1836 to his death as President of the Tradesman's Bank as well as president of the Bank of America (unrelated to the current Bank of America). He was also involved with Tammany Hall; along with Gideon Lee, another banker, his faction controlled the Democratic Party in New York City at the time that the Locofocos attempted, unsuccessfully, to take it over. He was one of the leaders in the movement opposed to sabbatarianism in the United States.

== Personal life ==
Fish was married three times. His first wife, Abigail Clark Fish, died in New Bedford while giving birth to a child who did not live. His second wife, Mary Polly Fish (Gerrish), died in New York City. He married his third wife, Mary Shepherd Fish, just four months later.

None of Fish's children survived. However, he adopted a son named William Fish who reportedly died before his father did as "a disgraced man". William had one child who was in line to inherit most of Fish's property, on the condition that "the youth must renounce his mother on arriving at the age of twenty-one."

In later life, Fish was a member of the Episcopal Church. He died on July 23, 1846, in New York. He is buried in the New York City Marble Cemetery in Manhattan. His obituary called him "a rough, obstinate, and eccentric man" but said he was "without guile" and "charitable", as well as a faithful friend.
