= Sylvia Leith-Ross =

English anthropologist and writer

Sylvia Leith-Ross MBE
- A picture taken when she was married
- Born: Sylvia Hope Ruxton; 30 September 1884; London
- Died: 12 February 1980 (aged 95); Holland Park, London
- Occupation: Anthropologist
- Spouse: Arthur Leith-Ross (m. 1907; died 1908)

Sylvia Hope Leith-Ross, MBE (née Ruxton) (30 September 1884 – 12 February 1980) was an English anthropologist and writer who worked primarily in Nigeria.

== Early life ==
Sylvia Hope Ruxton was born in London, the daughter of Admiral William Fitzherbert Ruxton and Sylvia Howland Grinnell Ruxton. Her father was an admiral in the Royal Navy; her mother was American-born, the daughter of Henry Grinnell and the sister of Henry Walton Grinnell. Sylvia and her mother moved to Paris in 1896, where she attended school. Sylvia's memoir, Cocks in the Dawn (1944), recalls this time as the beginning of her lifelong attachment to France.

== Career ==
In 1907, as a new bride, she moved to Zungeru in Nigeria, where her husband, Arthur Leith-Ross, was the chief transport officer for the British protectorate. She returned to Nigeria in 1910 as a widow, to stay with her brother and his wife Geneviève. The two women published a cookbook, West African Cookery (1908), which was popular with young European men new to Nigeria and unfamiliar with either cookery or West African produce. In 1921, she published Fulani Grammar, a basic guide to the Fulani language with some translated folktales.

In the 1920s her brother was based in Lagos; Sylvia Leith-Ross was appointed as "Lady Superintendent of Education" in 1925. She helped to establish Queen's College, Lagos, a girls' boarding school, and founded a girls' school in Kano. In 1931 she was sent back to England to recover her health. When she returned again, she used a Leverhulme Research Fellowship to conduct anthropological studies among the women of eastern Nigeria, following the Women's War; this work resulted in the book African Women: A Study of the Ibo of Nigeria (1939).

During World War I, Sylvia Leith-Ross, using her fluency in French, volunteered in military hospitals under the supervision of the French Red Cross. That work led to a job at a clinic in London from 1920 to 1925. She also worked at military hospitals during the Spanish Civil War and early in World War II. She was in Nigeria for the rest of the second World War, in part to provide intelligence on the French colonies to the Political and Economic Research Organization. Two more books, African Conversation Piece (1944, a travel diary) and Beyond the Niger (1951) were written during this time.

Late in life, she spent a decade (1956 to 1966) collecting pottery and interviewing pottery makers in Nigeria. Her last book published in her lifetime, Nigerian Pottery (1970), records her findings in photographs and text, as a catalogue to an exhibit she organised at the Jos Museum.

== Personal life ==
Sylvia Ruxton married Arthur Leith-Ross, a Canadian officer who served in Northern Nigeria with Upton Fitzherbert Ruxton, Sylvia's brother. Sylvia was widowed at 24, when Arthur died from blackwater fever. She died in Holland Park, London in 1980, aged 95. One more book, her autobiography titled Stepping Stones: Memoirs of Colonial Nigeria, 1907–1960, was published after her death, in 1983.
