= New York City Marble Cemetery =

Historic cemetery in Manhattan, New York

- U.S. National Register of Historic Places
- New York State Register of Historic Places
- New York City Landmark
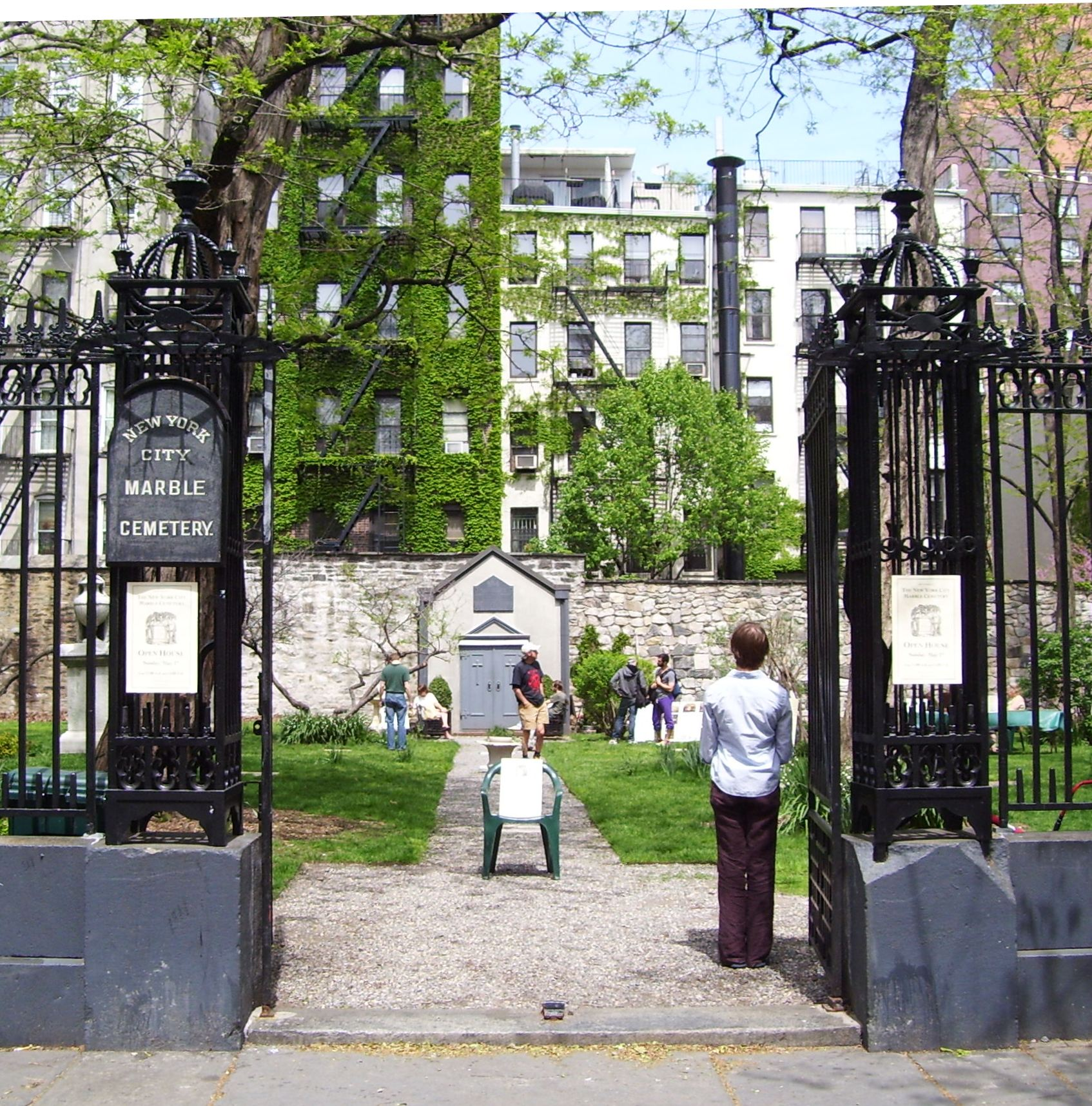
- The cemetery entrance on an open house day (May 1, 2011)

- Location within Lower Manhattan Location within New York Location within the United States
- Location: 52-74 Second Street; Manhattan, New York City, US
- Coordinates: 40°43′29″N 73°59′21″W
- Built: 1831
- Website: http://www.nycmc.org/
- NRHP reference No.: 80002703
- NYSRHP No.: 06101.000559
- NYCL No.: 0464

Significant dates
- Added to NRHP: September 17, 1980
- Designated NYSRHP: June 23, 1980
- Designated NYCL: March 4, 1969

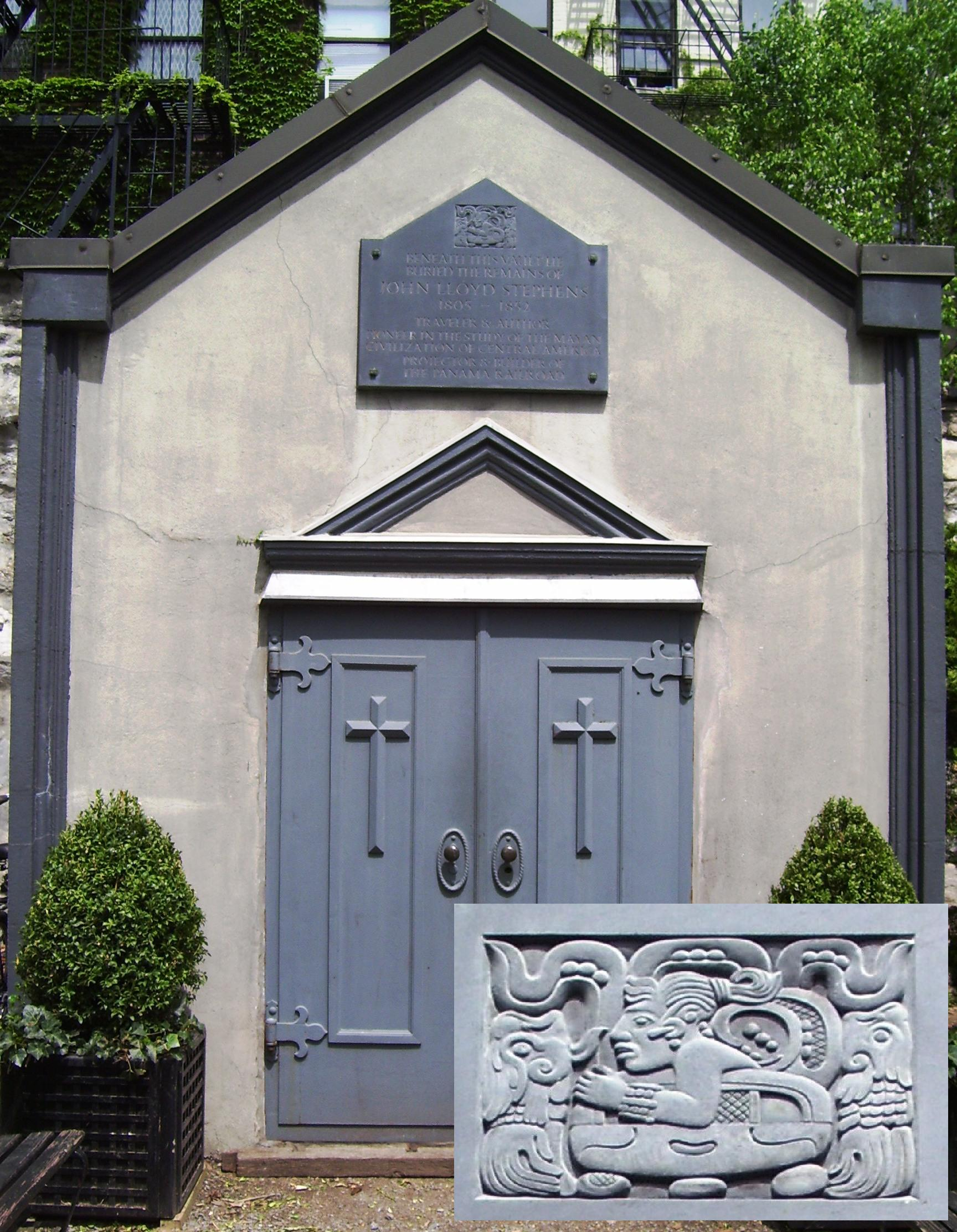
The monument to John Lloyd Stephens, with the Mayan glyph designed by his collaborator, Frederick Catherwood in the inset, lower right

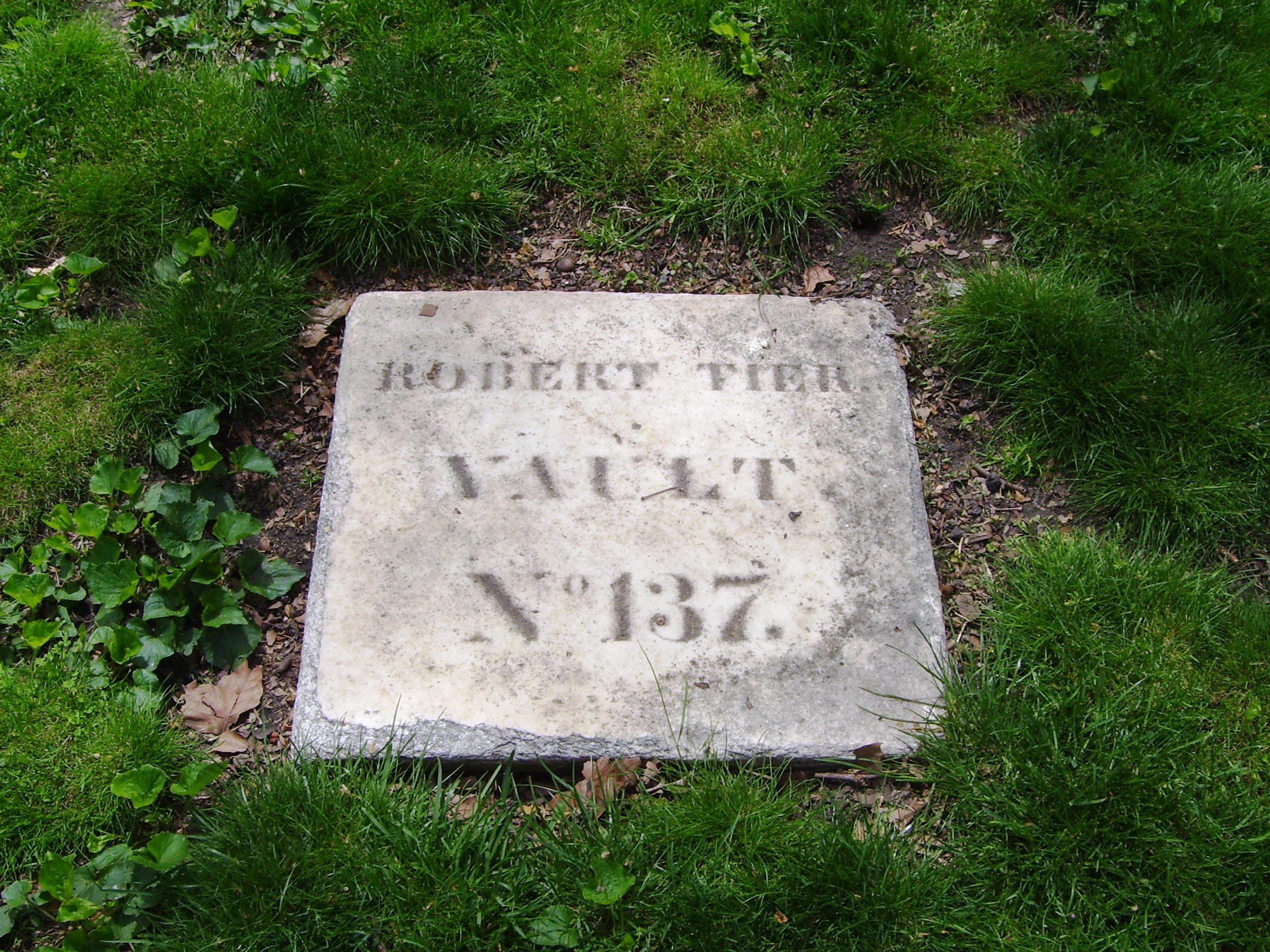
A marble marker, used for those vaults without monuments

The New York City Marble Cemetery is a historic cemetery founded in 1831, and located at 52-74 East 2nd Street between First and Second Avenues in the East Village neighborhood of Manhattan, New York City. The cemetery has 258 underground burial vaults constructed of Tuckahoe marble on the site.

The New York City Marble Cemetery, which was the city's second non-sectarian burial place, should not be confused with the nearby New York Marble Cemetery one block west, which was the first, having been established one year earlier. Both cemeteries were designated New York City landmarks in 1969, and in 1980 both were added to the National Register of Historic Places.

== History and description ==
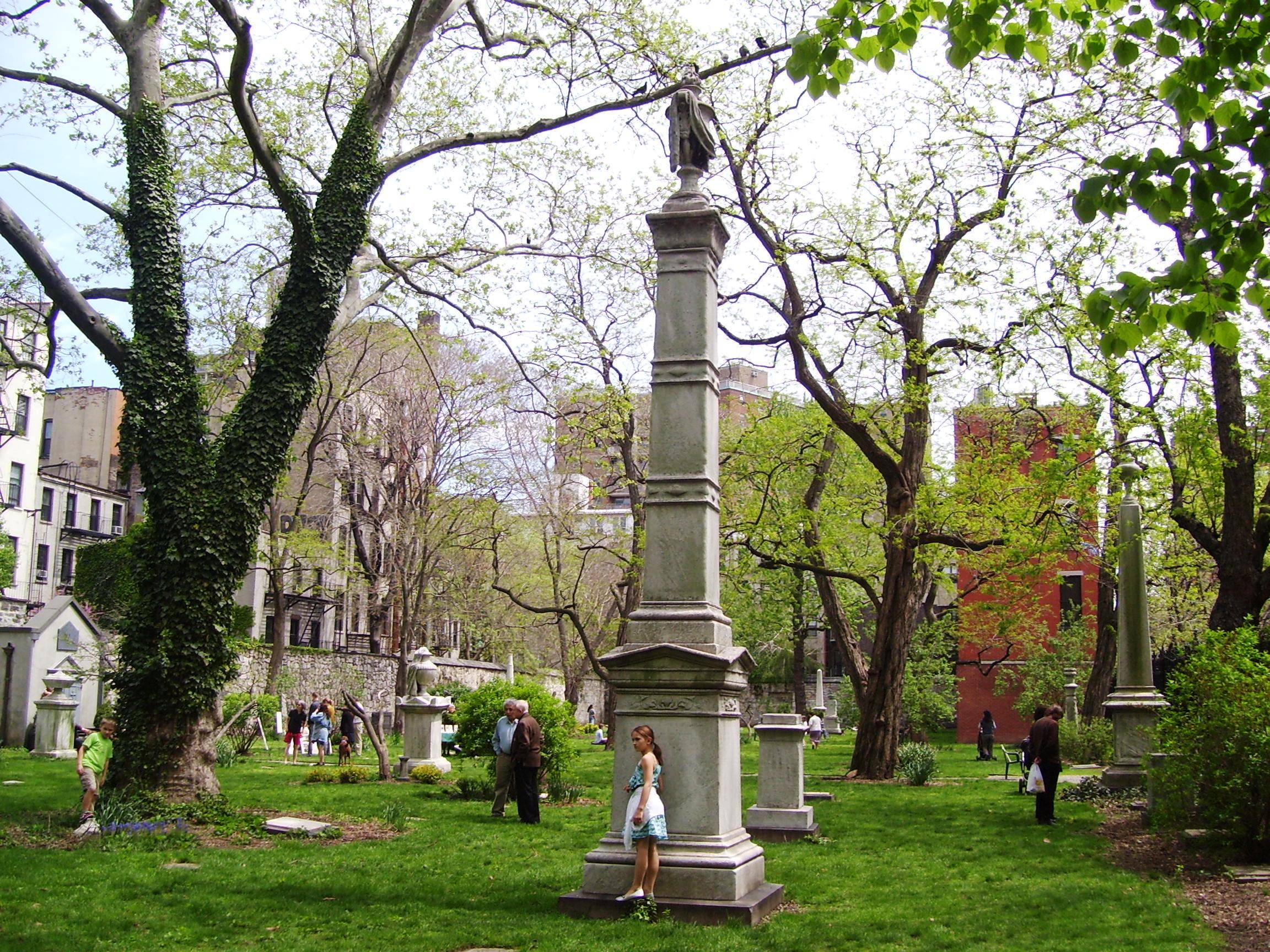
Unlike the nearby New York Marble Cemetery, the New York City Marble Cemetery has monuments and markers at the locations of the underground vaults.

In 1830, recent outbreaks of yellow fever had led city residents to fear burying their dead in coffins just a few feet below ground, and public health legislation had outlawed earthen burials. The New York Marble Cemetery had met this circumstance by constructing and selling underground marble burial vaults. A year later, five partners – Evert Bancker, Henry Booraem, Thomas Addis Emmett, Garret Storm and Samuel Whittemore – organized a similar venture one block east.

Land was purchased from Samuel Cowdrey, who was a vault owner in the earlier venture, and Perkins Nichols was engaged to construct the marble vaults, as he had done previously. The first of the vaults were ready by summer 1831, the cemetery was incorporated on April 26, 1832, and it continued to purchase land on either side of the original plot until 1835, when it reached its current dimensions.

Unlike the earlier cemetery, in which no monuments or markers indicated the placement of the vaults, instead being indicated on marble tablet embedded in the surrounding wall, the new cemetery marked the position of each vault with a marble marker, or with monuments of various sizes, according to the vault owner's preference. At the time, the new cemetery was considered to be a fashionable place to be buried.

== Visiting ==
According to the cemetery's website, it is open twice a year, on a Sunday in spring, and a weekend in the fall.

== Notable burials ==
- Stephen Allen, mayor of New York City and New York State Senator.
- Preserved Fish, a noted merchant
- David Sherwood Jackson, Congressman (1847–1849)
- James Lenox, co-Founder of the New York Public Library and founder of Presbyterian Hospital
- Edward Elmer Potter, Civil War Brigadier General
- James Henry Roosevelt, founder of Roosevelt Hospital, and other members of his branch of the Roosevelt family
- John Lloyd Stephens, archaeologist who was a pioneer in the study of Mayan culture
- Moses Taylor, financier and backer of the Atlantic Cable
- Isaac Varian, mayor of New York City (1839–1841)
- Marinus Willett, hero of the Revolutionary War and Mayor of New York City (1807–1808)

The remains from the churchyard of the South Dutch Church were moved to the cemetery, which also contains the remains of the Kip family, after whom Kips Bay is named. Cemetery tradition holds the bones of the first European men to be buried on Manhattan island, the Dutch dominies, were moved to the "Ministers' Vault".

Former burials

- John Ericsson, designer of USS Monitor, whose remains were subsequently moved to Sweden in 1890
- James Monroe, president of the United States, whose remains were subsequently moved to Hollywood Cemetery in Richmond, Virginia in 1858
