= Robert Bowne Minturn Jr. =

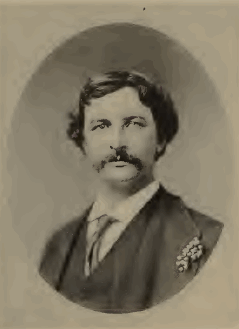
- Born: February 21, 1836; New York City, U.S.
- Died: December 15, 1889 (aged 53); New York City, U.S.
- Resting place: Trinity Church Cemetery and Mausoleum
- Education: Columbia University
- Occupation: Shipping magnate
- Spouse: Sarah Susannah Shaw (m. 1861–1889)
- Children: 7, including Edith Minturn Stokes
- Parent(s): Robert Bowne Minturn; Anna Mary Wendell
- Relatives: Isaac Newton Phelps Stokes (son-in-law)

Robert Bowne Minturn Jr. (February 21, 1836 – December 15, 1889) was an American shipping magnate of the mid to late 19th century.

== Early life and career ==
Robert Bowne Minturn Jr. was born in New York City to Robert Bowne Minturn Sr. and Anna Mary Wendell. He graduated from Columbia University in 1856, and joined his father's shipping firm, Grinnell, Minturn & Co, which is best known as being the owners of the clipper ship Flying Cloud. He was the author of New York to Delhi: by way of Rio de Janeiro, Australia and China (New York, 1858), an account of his voyage in connection with his work.

Minturn was also the vice president of the Denver and Rio Grande Western Railroad that founded the town of Minturn, Colorado, which is named for him.

== Personal life ==
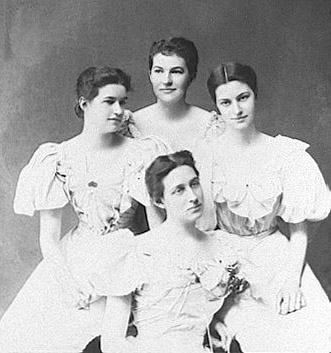
The Minturn sisters: Sarah May, Gertrude, Edith and Mildred

Minturn married Susanna Shaw (1839–1926), the sister of Robert Gould Shaw, in 1861. They had seven children:

1. Robert Shaw Minturn was born in New York, August 21, 1863. He married Howard Potter's daughter Bertha Howard Potter on January 22, 1906. He died in 1918.
2. Sarah Minturn, who was known as May, was born on Staten Island on September 3, 1865. On November 7, 1895, she married Henry Dwight Sedgwick III of the New England Dwight family. She died of a stroke on January 26, 1914, and is buried in the Sedgwick Pie.
3. Edith Minturn was born on Staten Island in 1867; she married Isaac Newton Phelps Stokes in 1895. She died on June 12, 1937.
4. Francis Minturn was born in 1871. He died in 1878 of diphtheria.
5. Gertrude Minturn was born in New York on June 25, 1872. She married Amos Pinchot in 1900. They divorced in 1918. She died in 1939.
6. Mildred Minturn was born in New York on November 19, 1875. She married Arthur Hugh Scott on October 30, 1906. She died of cancer on May 17, 1922, in Geneva, Switzerland.
7. Hugh Minturn was born in Elberon, New Jersey, on September 20, 1882. He died in London on February 9, 1915.

== Death ==
Minturn died of a stroke on December 15, 1889. He is buried in Trinity Church Cemetery and Mausoleum in New York City.
