= Statue of The Republic =

1918 sculpture by Daniel Chester French

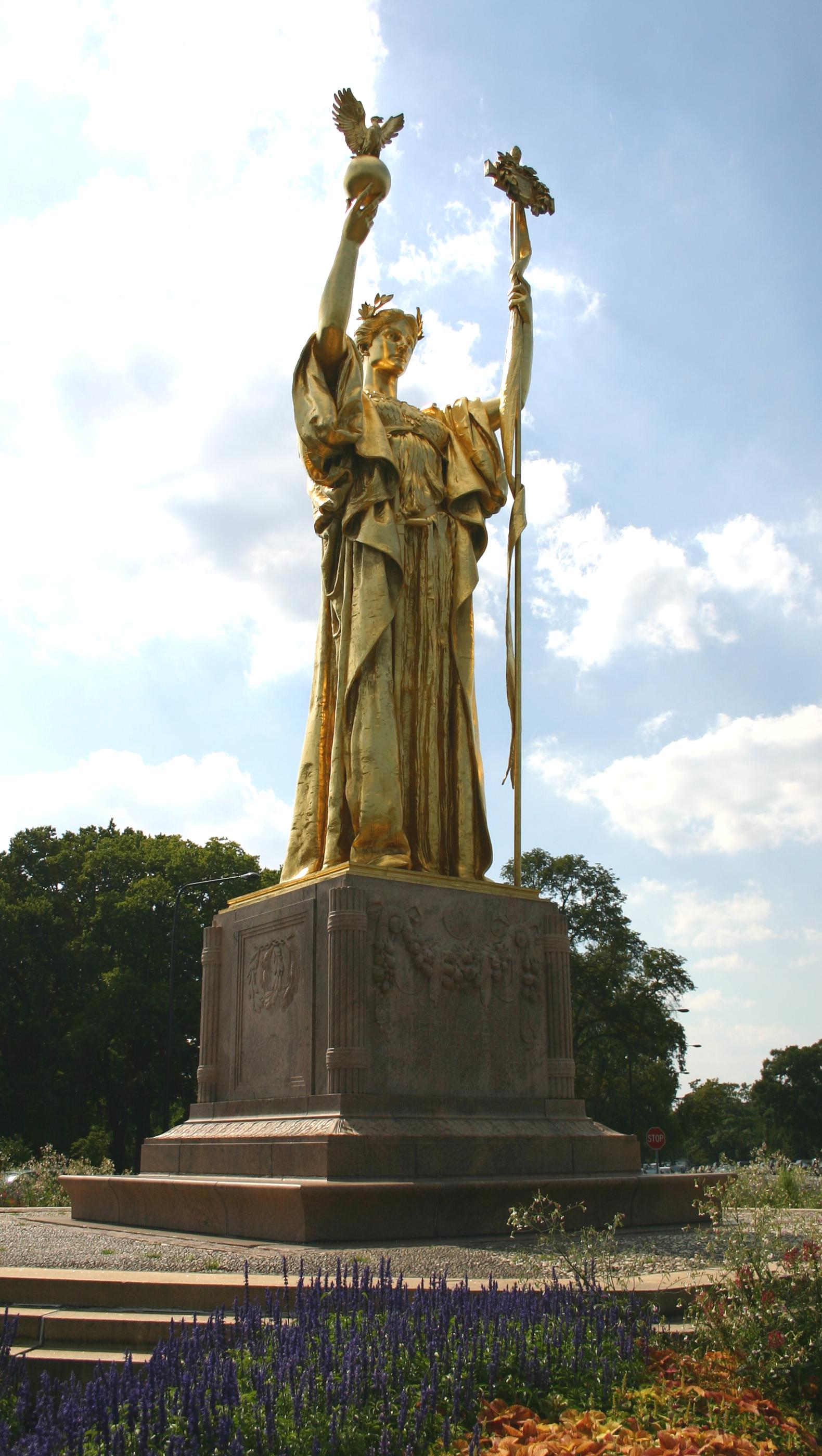
- A one-third scale replica of The Republic, a centerpiece of the 1893 World's Columbian Exposition
- Artist: Daniel Chester French
- Year: 1918 (replica of 1893 original)
- Type: Bronze
- Dimensions: 730 cm (24 ft)
- Location: Jackson Park, Chicago, Illinois; 41°46′46.6″N 87°34′47.7″W

The Statue of The Republic is a 24-foot-high (7.3 m) gilded bronze sculpture in Jackson Park, Chicago, Illinois, by Daniel Chester French. It is based on a colossal original statue, which was a centerpiece of the Chicago World's Fair in 1893. That statue was made of temporary materials and was destroyed after the fair. The smaller-scale replica sculpted by the same artist was erected in 1918 in commemoration of both the 25th anniversary of the Exposition and the Illinois' statehood centennial. The replacement statue is at the south end of the park at the intersection of East Hayes and South Richards Drive, adjacent to the golf course and approximately where the exposition's Administration Building and Electricity Building once stood. The statue was funded by the Benjamin Ferguson Fund, which commissioned French to cast this recreation of the original 65-foot-tall (20 m) statue that stood on the grounds of the Exposition of 1893. Minnie Clark, an original Gibson Girl, and Edith Minturn Stokes served as French's models for the original statue. Henry Bacon, the architect of the Lincoln Memorial, designed the festooned pedestal for the replica.

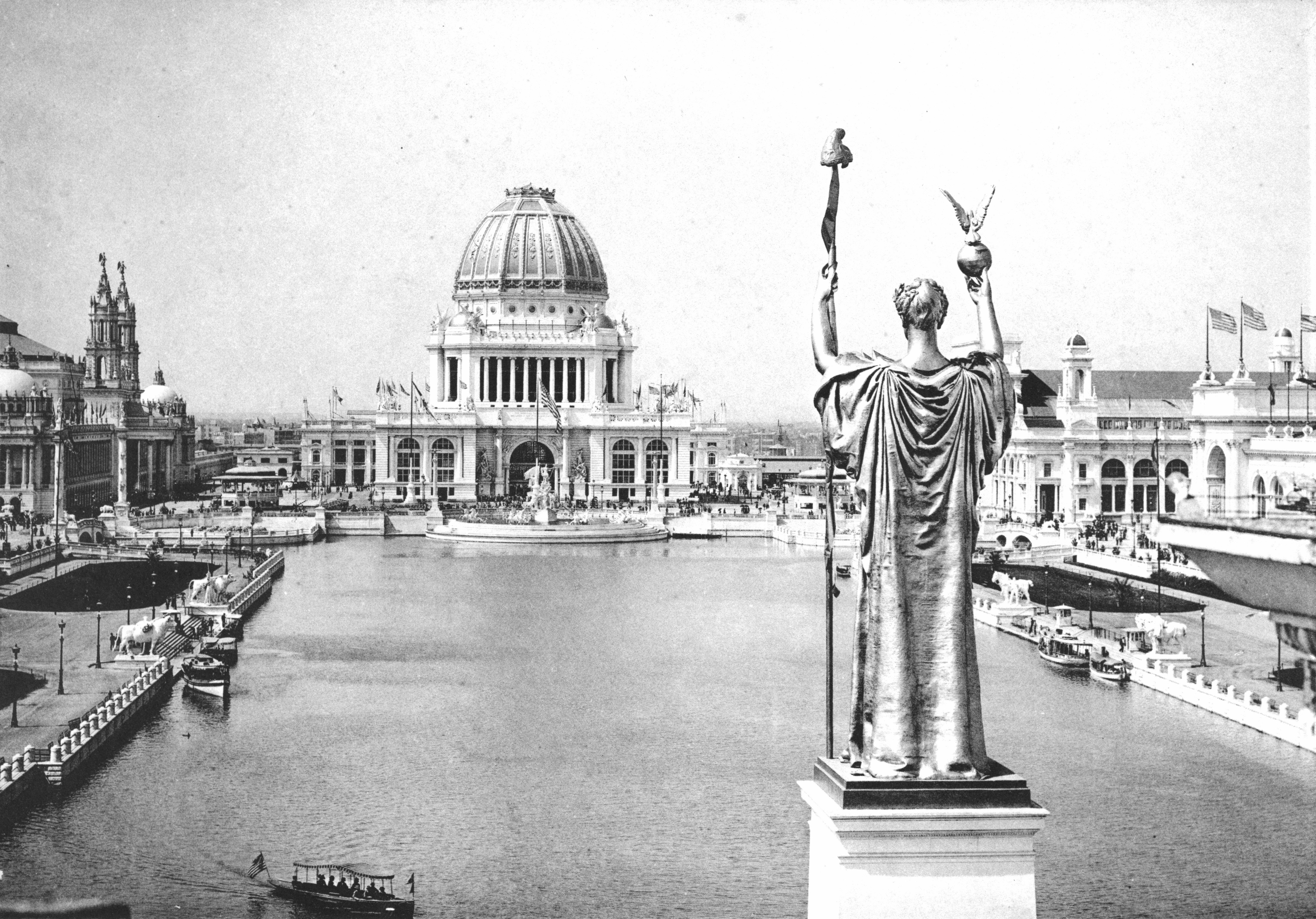
Daniel Chester French's original statue The Republic at the World's Columbian Exposition of 1893 in Chicago, facing the Administration Building across the Great Basin. This version had a Phrygian cap draped on the staff.

The statue's right hand holds a globe, on which an eagle perches with wings spread. The other hand grasps a staff with a plaque that reads "liberty", partly obscured by an encircling laurel wreath. The original at the Exposition had a Phrygian cap on top of the staff. It was only partly gilded (no gold on the exposed skin of the head, neck and arms), but the replica is completely gilded.

The original statue, constructed in 1893, stood in front of the Court of Honor, inside the Great Basin pool. However, on August 28, 1896 that statue was destroyed by fire on order of the park commissioners. The replacement statue stands in the area between the exposition's Electricity and Administration Buildings (both demolished after the exposition), at the intersection of Richards Drive and Hayes Drive. One of two additional replicas of the statue stands in Forest Lawn Memorial Park in Glendale, California.

The statue is referred to by Chicago historians by the colloquial name, the "Golden Lady". It was designated a Chicago Landmark on June 4, 2003.

== See also ==
- List of public art in Chicago
- Public sculptures by Daniel Chester French
