= Minturn, Colorado =

Town in Colorado, United States

- Home rule municipality
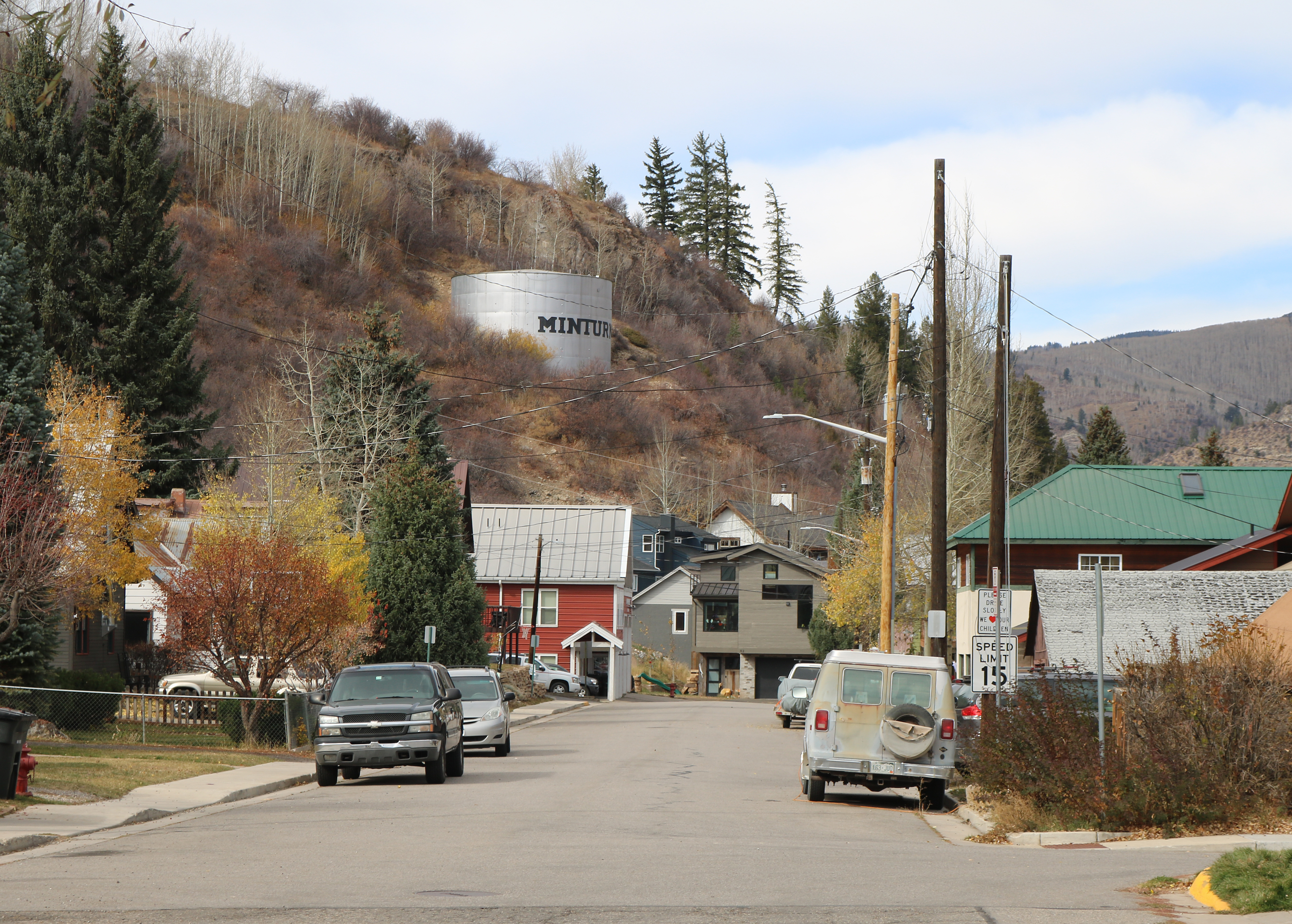
- Looking northwest along Pine Street

- Location of Minturn in Eagle County, Colorado
- Coordinates: 39°32′26″N 106°22′32″W
- Country: United States
- State: Colorado
- County: Eagle
- Incorporated (town): November 23, 1904

Government
  - Type: Home rule municipality

Area
  - Total: 8.20 sq mi (21.23 km^{2})
  - Land: 8.02 sq mi (20.77 km^{2})
  - Water: 0.18 sq mi (0.47 km^{2})
- Elevation: 7,861 ft (2,396 m)

Population (2020)
  - Total: 1,033
  - Density: 128.8/sq mi (49.74/km^{2})
- Time zone: UTC-7 (Mountain (MST))
  - Summer (DST): UTC-6 (MDT)
- ZIP code: 81645 (PO Box)
- Area code: 970
- FIPS code: 08-50920
- GNIS feature ID: 2413005
- Website: www.minturn.org

Minturn is a home rule municipality in Eagle County, Colorado, United States. The town population was 1,033 at the 2020 United States census.

== Geography ==
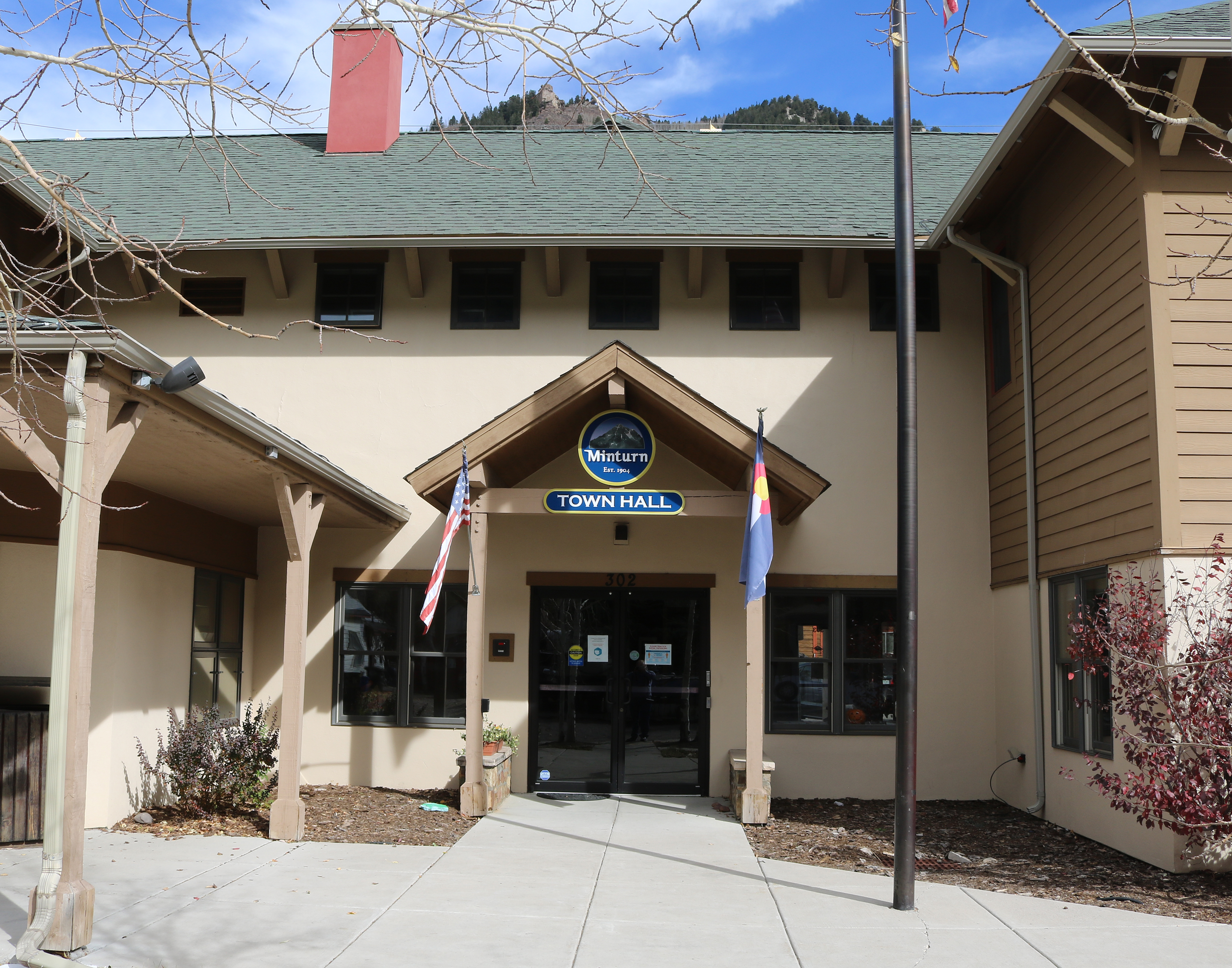
Minturn Town Hall

Minturn is located in southeastern Eagle County on the Eagle River between the resort communities of Vail and Beaver Creek. The town limits extend 2 miles (3 km) northwest along U.S. Route 24 to Interstate 70 at Exit 171, from which point it is 5 miles (8 km) east to Vail and 5 miles west to Avon at the base of Beaver Creek Resort. Eagle, the county seat, is 25 miles (40 km) to the west, and Denver is 101 miles (163 km) to the east. US 24 leads south 30 miles (48 km) over the Continental Divide at Tennessee Pass to Leadville.

According to the United States Census Bureau, the town has a total area of 7.8 square miles (20.1 km^{2}), of which 7.6 square miles (19.6 km^{2}) is land and 0.2 square miles (0.5 km^{2}), or 2.32%, is water.

Minturn is surrounded on three sides by White River National Forest, with the Holy Cross Wilderness bordering the southwest side of the town. The national forest offers hiking, biking, snowshoeing, cross country skiing, and other recreational opportunities. Five huts operated by the Tenth Mountain Hut Association along with their associated trail systems are found in the local Eagle-Holy Cross ranger district. Camp Hale, a World War II winter training site now on the National Register of Historic Places, is situated toward the south end of the district.

The Holy Cross District lies on the northern extent of the Sawatch Range and the western flank of the Gore Range. It includes the forest areas surrounding the towns of Vail, Minturn, Red Cliff and Avon. To the north, the district takes in much of the Piney River and Sheephorn Creek drainages.

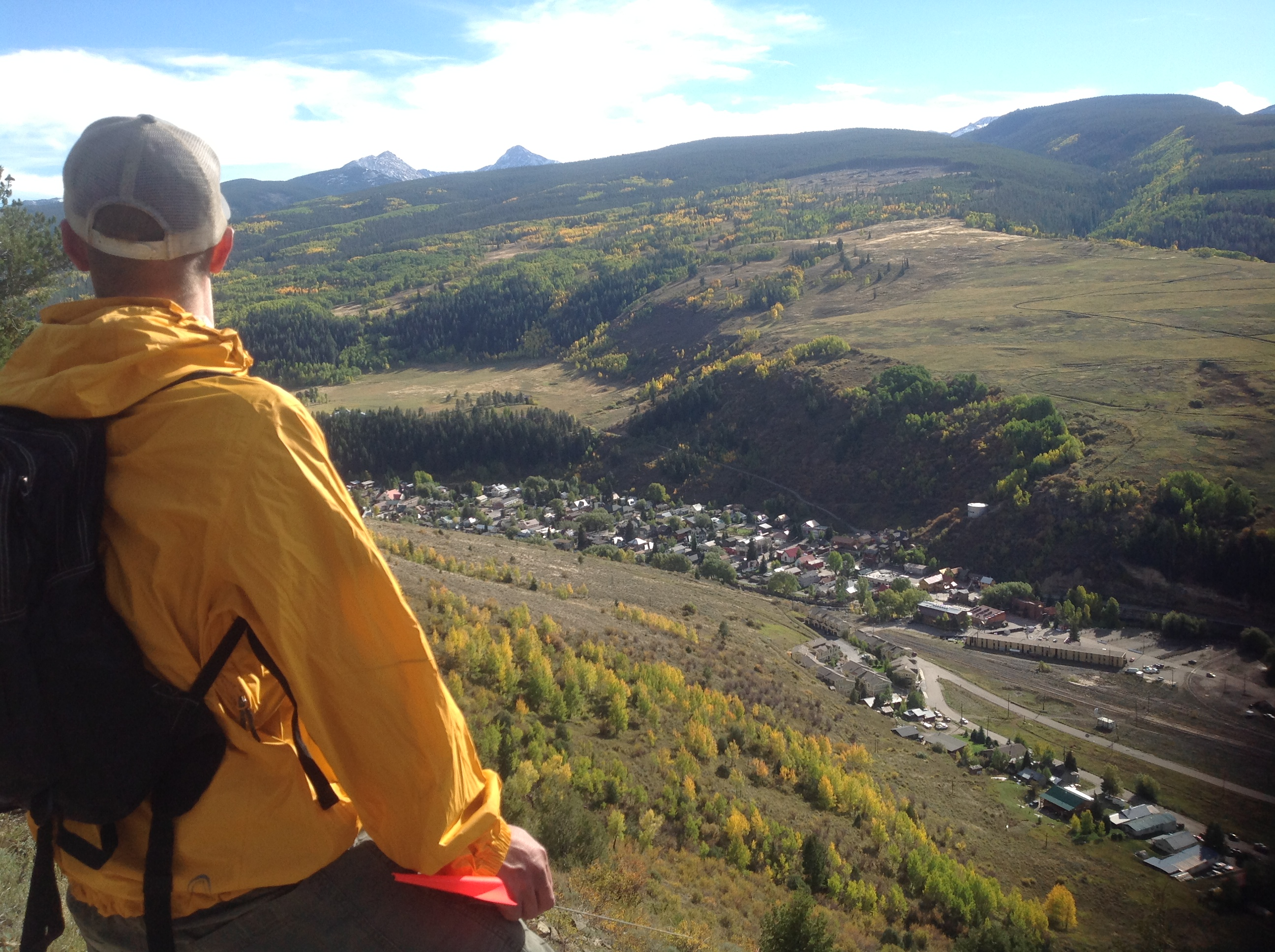
Lionshead Rock Trail

== Demographics ==
Historical population
Census	Pop.	Note	%±
1910	241		—
1920	298		23.7%
1930	400		34.2%
1940	596		49.0%
1950	509		−14.6%
1960	662		30.1%
1970	706		6.6%
1980	1,060		50.1%
1990	1,066		0.6%
2000	1,068		0.2%
2010	1,027		−3.8%
2020	1,033		0.6%
U.S. Decennial Census

The census of 2020 reported that Minturn had 1,033 people living in 365 households. The racial makeup of the town was 82.00% White, 0.48% African American, 1.74% Native American, 0.38% Asian, 0.00% Pacific Islander, 6.10% from other races, and 9.49% from two or more races. Hispanic and Latino people of any race made up 21.58% of the population.

Of the 561 housing units, 80.21% were occupied. The homeownership rate was 61%, and the median rent was $1,898. The median household income was $101,950, while the median family income was $109,196. 4.8% of the population was in poverty.

As for education, 13.8% reached high school or equivalent, 21.1% had some college but no degree, 4.1% had an associate degree, 38.9% had a bachelor's degree, and 21.3% had a graduate degree. The average travel time to work was 17 minutes, and the employment rate was 79.2%.

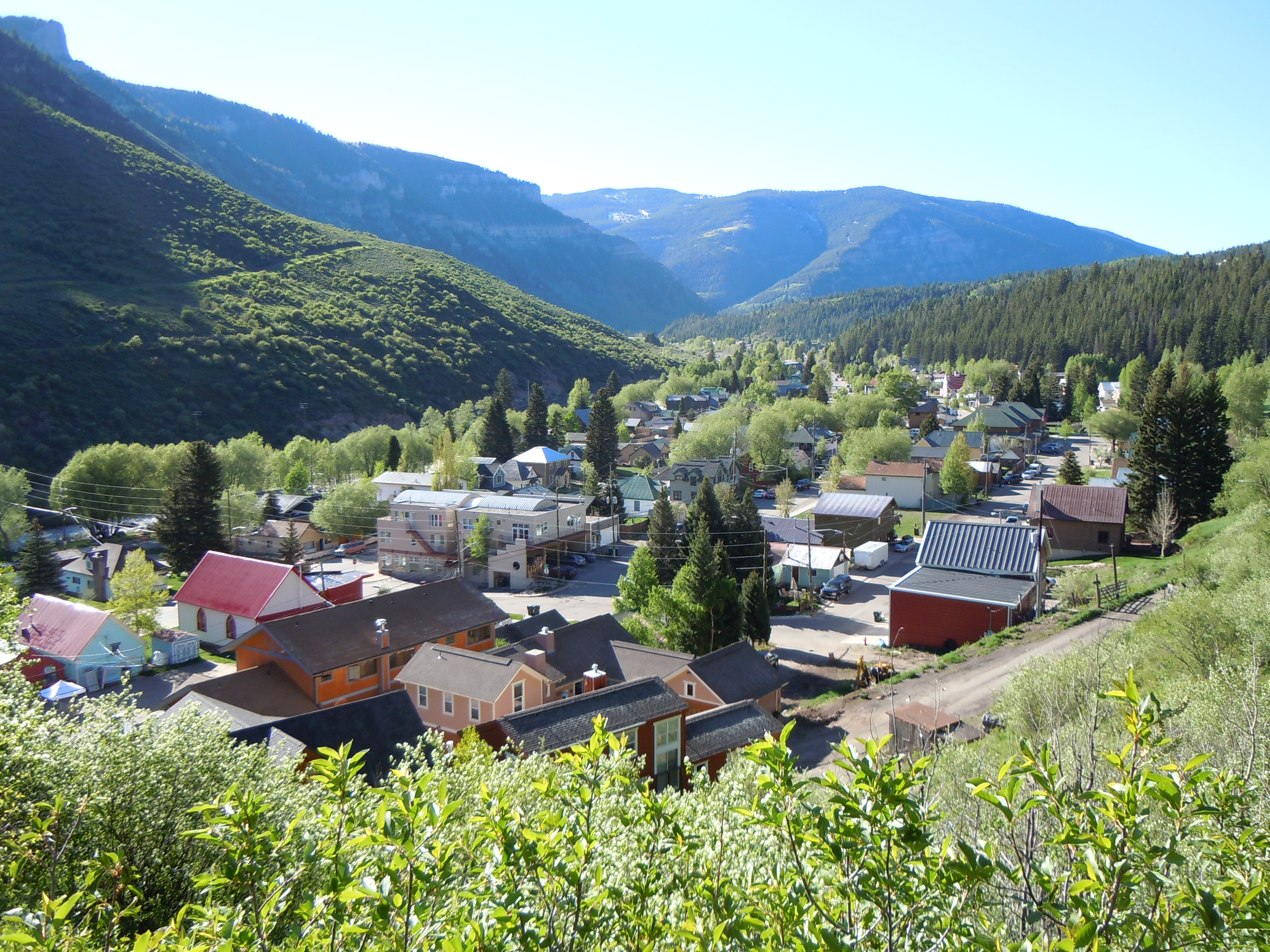
Town of Minturn

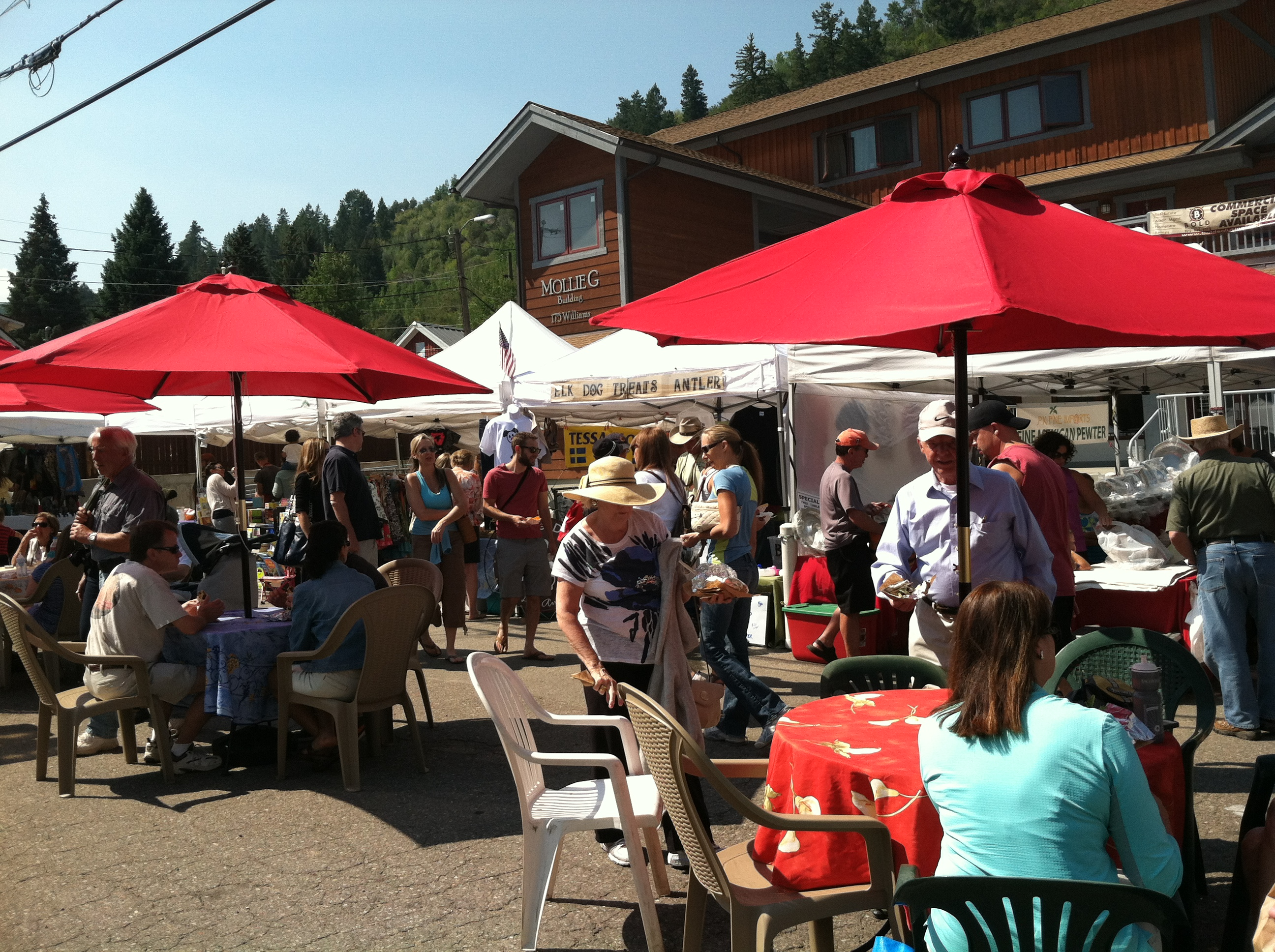
Minturn Summer Market

== History ==
The town is named for Robert Bowne Minturn, Jr., who was vice president of the Denver & Rio Grande Railroad that founded the town. He was also a member of Grinnell, Minturn & Co.

Minturn's oldest families settled at the confluence of Gore Creek and the Eagle River in the late 1800s. Some created homesteads and farmed the land, while others mined silver in the mountains high above town. With the arrival of the Denver & Rio Grande Railroad in 1887, Minturn quickly developed into a booming crossroads for transportation and industry. By the turn of the century, a growing population of mining and railroad workers and their families raised the demand for business and services in town. In response, Minturn was incorporated on November 15, 1904.

Minturn has adapted to several major changes in the local economy over the decades, including the development of Vail and Beaver Creek ski resorts, the closing of the Gilman mine, and the idling of rail lines through Minturn.

== Transportation ==
Minturn is served by Eagle County Regional Airport in Gypsum, 30 miles (48 km) to the west.

Eagle County provides bus service from the Dowd Junction Transit Stop with service to Minturn, Vail, Leadville, Eagle-Vail, Avon, Beaver Creek, Edwards, Eagle, Gypsum and Dotsero.

Interstate 70 runs east–west two miles north of Minturn. Highway 24 runs east–west through Minturn, and to the east leading to the towns of Red Cliff and eventually Leadville.

The railroad line, now owned by the Union Pacific Railroad (UP), has been out of use since 1997 but the tracks remain in place.

== Education ==
It is in the Eagle County School District RE 50.

== See also ==
- List of statistical areas in Colorado
