= Robert Bowne Minturn =

19th c. American merchant and philanthropist of New York City

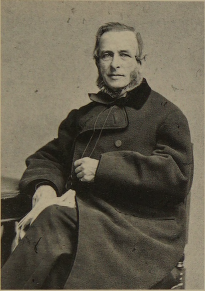
- Born: November 16, 1805
- Died: January 9, 1866

Robert Bowne Minturn (November 16, 1805 – January 9, 1866) was one of the most prominent American merchants and shippers of the mid-19th century. Today, he is probably best known as being one of the owners of the famous clipper ship, Flying Cloud.

== Family ==
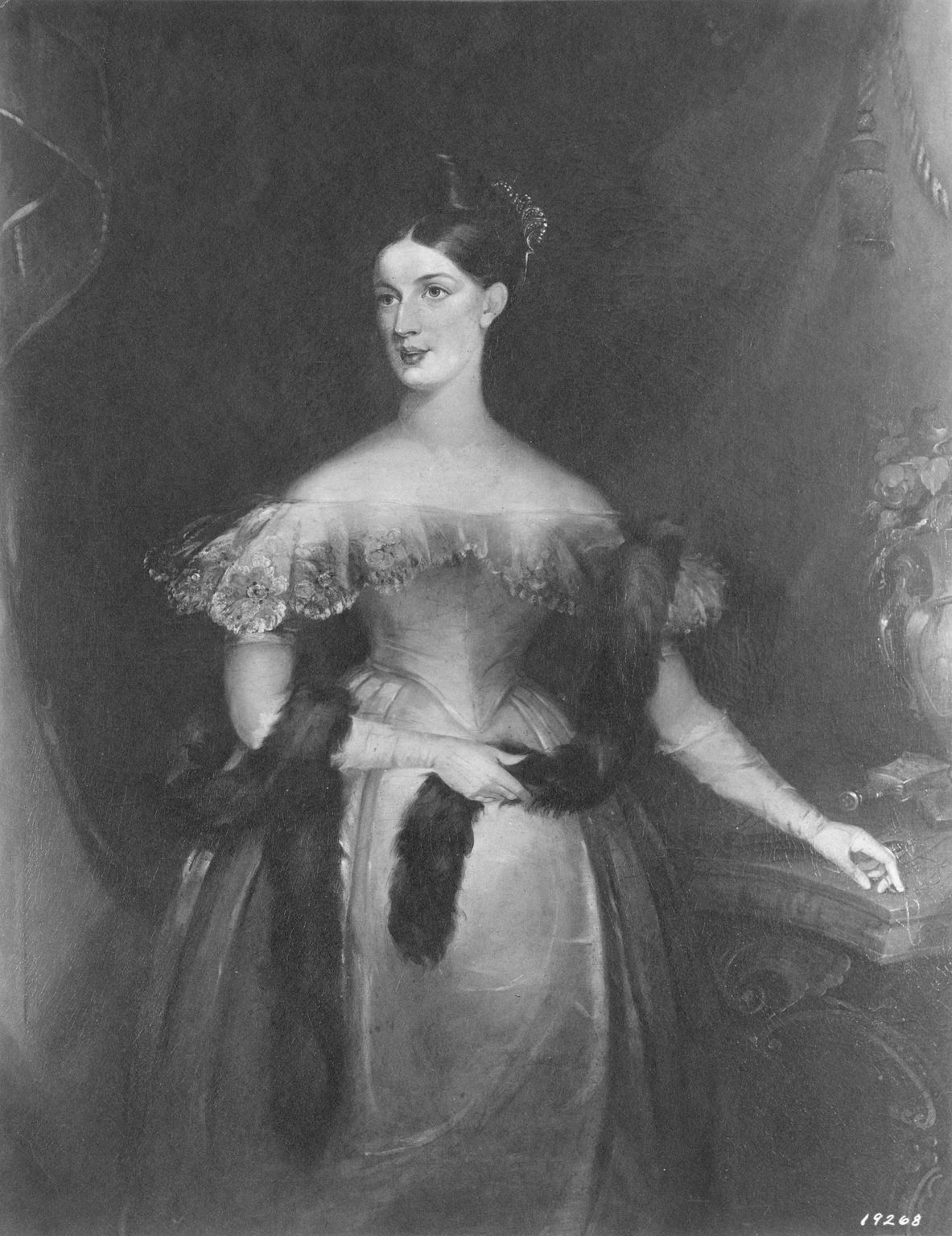
Anna Mary Wendell Minturn

Minturn was born to a family long prominent in New England and New York shipping circles. His father was William Minturn (Jr.); his mother was Sarah Bowne, a descendant of John Bowne. William was "a well-known merchant shipper" and was one of the founders of the Mutual Fire Insurance Company of New York. He is reported to have spent several years in the China trade, where there were enormous profits to be made. He was at various times in partnership with his brother Jonas and in the firm of Minturn and Champlin. After the failure of Minturn & Champlin, he took ill and died soon after, when Robert was in his early teens.

It appears that Robert Minturn's grandfather, William Minturn (Sr.) (born Rhode Island, March 18, 1738; died Newport, Rhode Island, August 23, 1799), was one of the residents of Rhode Island who feared that the British would attempt to re-take their lost colonies after the American Revolution and moved his family and business to New York, believing it would be more protected from seaborne attack. He was one of the founders of Hudson, New York. In 1791 William again moved, this time to New York City, where the opportunities were greater (and shipping distances shorter). Soon he became wealthy: he, his son, grandson, and great-grandson all garnered listings in the Encyclopedia of American Wealth. In 1799, his health failing, William Minturn returned to Rhode Island to retire but he died within the month. His widow (Penelope Greene; born August 21, 1746 - died April 6, 1821, the daughter of Benjamin Greene and Niobe Paul and a third cousin once removed of General Nathanael Greene) returned to New York where she lived among her sons on Pearl Street.

Robert B. Minturn married Anna Mary Wendell (1810-1886) in June 1835. She was the daughter of John Lansing Wendell, a prominent attorney in Albany, New York, and reported to have been involved with Grinnell, Minturn & Co. though Robert joined the firm before his marriage. Anna died in 1886 and left an estate worth about $1 million, worth currently about $2.2 billion in relative output (2023).

Robert's sister Sarah married Henry Grinnell, who later became Robert's business partner.

== Career ==
Robert Minturn received an English education, but he was forced by the death of his father to leave school; at the age of fourteen, he began work in a counting-house. He was received into partnership in 1825 with Charles Green, whose clerk he had been. In 1830, he entered the firm of Fish and Grinnell; his sister Sarah had married partner Henry Grinnell in 1822.

In 1832, the firm was reorganized as Grinnell, Minturn & Co., or simply Grinnell & Minturn. That company was already established in the transatlantic packet trade, but it grew tremendously as Irish fleeing famine led many thousands to emigrate to North America yearly, particularly from 1845 to 1855. When the California "Gold Rush" caused a large increase in traffic to that state, Grinnell & Minturn established a shipping line to serve the market, and bought the Flying Cloud for that line; Robert Minturn actually owned a portion of the ship in his personal capacity. The success of Grinnell & Minturn made Robert Minturn a wealthy man. He became known as one of the merchant-princes of New York with financial interests in retail, wholesale, and manufacturing. In 1845, he was said to be worth $200,000, which is roughly the equivalent today of $173 million in income value or $3 billion in relative output value (2023). His son Robert Jr. joined the firm in 1856 after graduation from Columbia University.

== Other activities ==
In May 1848, an overworked Robert Minturn and his wife, sister-in-law, and six children (with servants) took an extended "grand tour" of Europe and parts of the Middle East. They sailed on one of his many packet ships, the Patrick Henry, Captain Joseph C. Delano, first cousin to Franklin Delano Roosevelt's maternal grandfather Warren Delano Jr., the American merchant who made a large fortune smuggling illegal opium into China.

"[The Patrick Henry] was one of the vessels which had so often before carried invalids, or tired clergymen, or young men broken down by study, sent by Mr. Minturn to recruit their strength by a voyage," Robert B. Minturn, Jr. wrote. "He had so frequently done these kindnesses, that the application for them at last became incessant. Sometimes it was for an individual, sometimes for a family of foreigners, who had come to America in search of what they did not find — a living — and were most thankful to be sent back to their homes across the Atlantic." The Minturns took an eighteen-month tour of England, France, Italy, Switzerland, Germany, Jerusalem and Egypt that was said to have inspired plans that led to the creation of New York's Central Park.

In England, Minturn met the poet William Wordsworth and Lord Palmerston, who is remembered, among other endeavors, for evicting 2,000 tenants on his County Sligo estate and financing the cheapest passages possible on coffin ships to Canada on which many died or became sick and died later. Minturn went also to Scotland, from where he took the shortest route to Portrush in Northern Ireland. He visited the Giant's Causeway, which "excited his imagination", and promptly went on to France.

=== Philanthropy ===
Minturn declined all offers of public office, except the post of the first Commissioner of Emigration, which he accepted, in the newly legislated body in 1847, from "a wish to secure the rights of emigrants." He was an active manager of charitable associations in New York City and was a founder of St. Luke's Hospital. He was the first president of the Union League Club, which was formed when the Union Club membership was divided over support for President Lincoln and the Civil War.

Minturn and his wife donated land for the establishment of New York's Central Park, having been inspired by the beauty of foreign cities and their parks, as seen during his family's trip abroad in 1848–1849. Minturn served as a vice president on the relief committee that eventually sent the Macedonian, June 19, 1847, with supplies to Ireland. He was said to hand out food to the city's growing urban poor, from the front stoop of his New York townhouse before helping found the Association for Improving the Condition of the Poor. Minturn reportedly once noted that the $5 million spent on ship fares in 1847, "substantially reduced the cost of carrying freight" and helped the economy by lowering the price of American cotton and grain for English buyers.."

=== Temperance and abolitionism ===
In 1844, Minturn offered Irish Catholic priest and teetotalist reformer Father Mathew free passage in any of their ships to come visit America, which he accepted in 1849, aboard the Ashburton (1842, 1,015 tons), beginning a two-year visit during which he acquired 600,000 followers who took his temperance pledge to treat alcohol abuse, alcohol dependence and alcoholism. Father Mathew befriended Frederick Douglass when Douglass visited Ireland in 1845. The priest wanted to remain singularly focused on helping people stop drinking alcohol and was criticized for not speaking out against slavery and foregoing the abolitionist cause.

In 1848, Minturn provided evidence before Parliament that teetotalism was encouraged by American shipowners as underwriters offered "a return of 10% off the premium on voyages performed without the consumption of spirits."

Like his Quaker forebears, he was an abolitionist reported to have purchased a number of slaves for the purpose of setting them free. He was a benefactor of the Freedmen's Association and a co-founder (with 23 others) of Children's Village.

He bought a 173-acre estate in Hastings, New York in 1857, "Locust Wood," in what is now Zinsser Park. The home was torn down in 1967.

== Death ==
Minturn died suddenly at age 60 on January 9, 1866. He was "seized with apoplexy, and expired in a few hours,” historian Anne Ayres wrote in 1880:

“Mr. Minturn, though actively engaged in commercial business, never wearied in works of practical benevolence. His thoughtful head and large heart were given to such, with the greatest earnestness and sincerity, even in his hours of relaxation from the counting-house, and he was extensively occupied in helping forward or governing a vast variety of agencies for the benefit of the poor and afflicted.”

Dr. William Augustus Muhlenberg, Episcopal minister, said:

”The loss seems irreparable. Who can repair it? Who now will be our foremost man in enterprises of good? To whom now shall we go first in any new project of humanity?...Who will be his successor, with his adamantine integrity, in places where, alas, such virtue is rare?”

His second-born son, John Wendell Minturn, who joined Grinnell, Minturn & Co at age 24 and was a principal owner with his older brother after their father's death, committed suicide on April 30, 1881, at 78 South Street, the company's headquarters. John was 42 years old. Robert's eldest son died less than eight years later in 1889 at age 53 of a stroke.

Robert Bowne Minturn's granddaughters were immortalized in an 1899 miniature oil painting, "The Daughters of Robert Minturn (Edith, Sarah May, Gertrude, and Mildred)," held by the New-York Historical Society.

== Descendants ==
- Robert Bowne Minturn Jr. (born New York, February 21, 1836); graduated from Columbia in 1856 and joined the family firm soon thereafter. He married Sarah Susannah Shaw (1839–1926), sister of Colonel Robert Gould Shaw; he was the author of New York to Delhi (New York, 1858). Minturn, Colorado, is named for him.
- Susan Carter Minturn (born New York, ca. 1837); she married Thomas Charles Baring in 1859.
- John Wendell Minturn (born New York, ca. 1838).
- Anna Mary Minturn (born New York, March 16, 1841); she married Rev. Charles Penrose Quicke.
- Edith Minturn (born New York, March 27, 1844), who married Mahlon Day Sands
- Sarah Minturn (born New York, ca. 1845).
- Eliza Theodora Minturn (born New York, October 15, 1850).
- William Minturn (born New York ca. 1854).
- Another descendant is Edie Sedgwick, his great-great-granddaughter.

== Bibliography ==
- Kelley, Rev. Edmond, A Family Redeemed From Bondage; Being Rev. Edmond Kelley, (the Author,) His Wife, and Four Children. New Bedford, Massachusetts (published by the author), 1851. (http://docsouth.unc.edu/neh/kelley/kelley.html)
- Lawson, Melinda, "A Profound National Devotion": The Civil War Union Leagues and the Construction of a New National Patriotism; Civil War History Volume 48, Number 4, December 2002, pp. 338–362.
- The Bowne House Historical Society, Inc., History: Bowne Family Biographies, 2006.
