= Grinnell, Minturn & Co =

Shipping company

Grinnell, Minturn & Co. was one of the leading transatlantic shipping companies in the middle 19th century. It is probably best known today as being the owner and operator of the Flying Cloud, arguably the greatest of the clipper ships.

The company was engaged in the Old China Trade in the early 19th century. Afterward, it brought raw materials to the British Isles and emigrants from Ireland to the New World during the Great Famine. With the California gold rush, it reached its pinnacle.

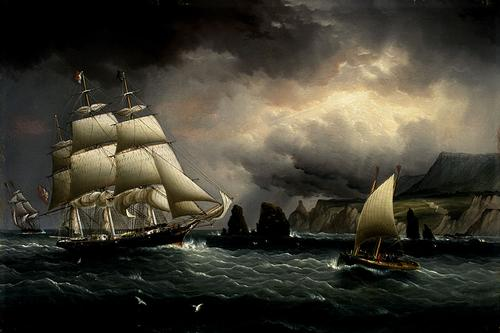
The Clipper Ship "Flying Cloud", by James E. Buttersworth, 1859–60.

== History ==
The company was founded about 1815 as Fish & Grinnell (the senior partner of which had the memorable, if improbable, name of Preserved Fish (1766–1846); the Grinnell was his cousin, Joseph Grinnell, one of six sons of Cornelius Grinnell, a shipper and merchant in New Bedford, Massachusetts. Joseph Grinnell's two younger brothers, Henry (1800–1874) and Moses (1803–1877), became members of the firm in 1825, and the name changed to Fish, Grinnell & Co. In 1828, Joseph retired.

In 1824, a quarter-century before the firm entered the transportation trade of the California gold rush, a captain of one of its whalers, Walter Comstock, said that he brought gold from California, "and that nearly every vessel which put into the harbor of San Francisco Bay brought away samples of gold."

In about 1830, Robert Bowne Minturn (1805–1866), a member of a family long prominent in New England and New York shipping circles, joined the firm (his sister Sarah had married Henry Grinnell in 1822) and, in 1833, it became Grinnell, Minturn & Co., or known simply as "Grinnell & Minturn," a conglomerate of merchant and sailing magnates with New England Quaker roots.

Grinnell & Minturn emerged as one of the six primary New York mercantile firms engaged in the opium trade, which brought vast profits to its stakeholders. Though historians posit that Grinnell & Minturn made for money in the transatlantic passenger trade, especially during an Gorta Mór.

The company stayed "in the family" and remained active until about 1880.

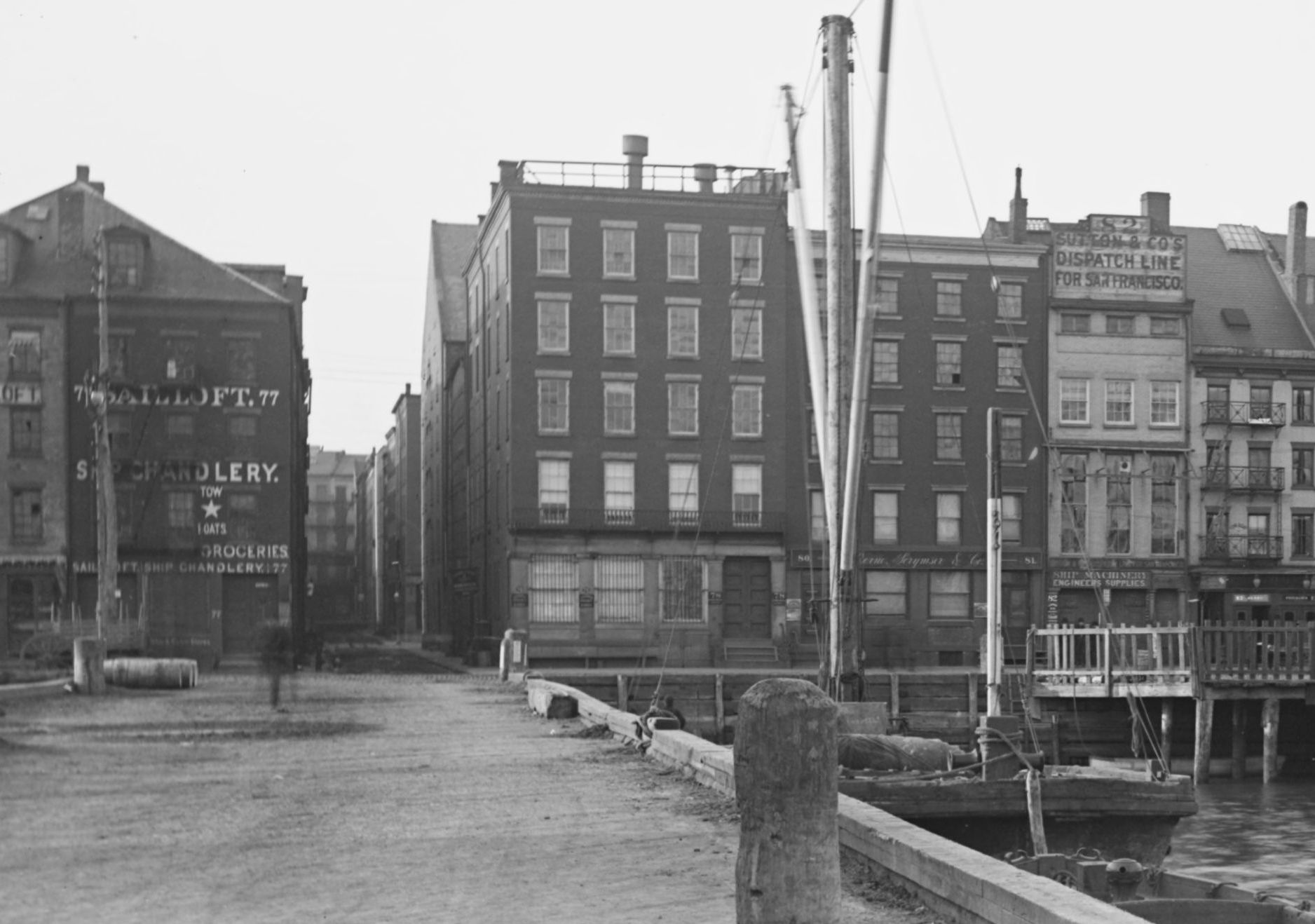
"South Street from Maiden Lane to Burling Slip, New York City, February 23, 1891." Courtesy New-York Historical Society. Depicts the Burling Slip in the foreground (right) and the former five-story headquarters of Grinnell, Minturn & Co.(center), site of the suicide of the son of billionaire Robert B. Minturn as the firm closed down operations.

Partners Robert B. Minturn, Franklin H. Delano, Moses H. Grinnell and brother Henry Grinnell were among the wealthiest of the merchant-prince-kings of New York in their day, who built one of 19th century America's largest transportation empires in the Golden Age of Sail with a one-time fleet of more than fifty ships that sailed to every continent. In 1845, before the height of the emigrant trade from which the firm was profiting, Minturn was reported to be worth $200,000; today's equivalent of more than $2.7 billion in relative output. The Grinnells were worth $250,000, each, or more than $6.8 billion combined; and partner Delano, who had married into the Astor family, was valued at what would be worth $5.76 billion today.

Fellow shipping magnate A.A. Low wrote sarcastically about the two principals, Moses and Robert, in a letter to a sibling: “Our friends, Grinnell, Minturn are heartbroken about the famine. They have a house dinner to celebrate the fortune it is bringing them, and dine on terrapin, salmon, peas, asparagus, strawberries—all out of season, of course—then Mr. Grinnell gives the famine fund $360, which he had lost on a bet with Mr. Wetmore (William S. Wetmore, founder of rival China trade firm Wetmore & Company.)” "Famine" refers to the Great Hunger of Ireland, 1845-1852, which caused more than a million deaths and more than two million to emigrate, many on the ships owned and profited by Grinnell, Minturn & Co.

Minturn served as vice president on the relief committee that eventually sent the Macedonian, June 19, 1847, with supplies to Ireland, and was a Commissioner of Emigration and a founder of the Association for Improving the Condition of the Poor. Minturn reportedly once noted that the $5 million spent on ship fares in 1847, "substantially reduced the cost of carrying freight," and helped the economy by lowering the price of American cotton and grain for English buyers. According to the website, An Irish Passenger, An American Family, And Their Time, profit, "rather than humanitarian impulses" drove immigration, "and because government regulatory agencies and private philanthropies were unwilling or unable to exert much control over that business, 19th century emigrants were often literally treated as human freight."

=== Blue Swallowtail Line ===
The company's first major endeavor was its Liverpool Line, known as the Blue Swallowtail Line (1822–1880) from its distinctive blue and white swallowtailed house flag. This enterprise was originally started by Fish, Grinnell and Co. in cooperation with Thaddeus Phelps and was called the "Fourth Line of Liverpool Packets." The Blue Swallowtail line originally sailed monthly and, like the other Liverpool-New York packet lines, did a thriving business in the wave of Irish immigration in the wake of an Gorta Mor. Its ships included the New World (built 1846, and reported to be the largest merchant ship in the world at the time), Queen of the West, Henry Clay, Ashburton, Patrick Henry, Roscoe, American Union, and Albert Gallatin. In 1851, the line expanded to eight regular packets sailing from Liverpool on the 6th and 21st of each month. In 1854, management divided between Cornelius Grinnell, who took over four ships, and the firm, which operated five ships, as before. The firm added nine more vessels before 1860, including the Packet Aurora (built 1854, 1,639 tons), with three decks and room for 1,000 passengers. This included the massive Ontario (built in 1855 at 1,501 tons burthen), which ran aground off of Holgate, Long Beach Island, New Jersey in 1876.

=== Red Swallowtail Line ===
The "Red Swallowtail" flag

The company entered the New York-London market a year later with its London (Red Swallowtail) Line, which also endured until 1880. The flag was the same as for the Liverpool line, but with red at the hoist instead of blue. The ships included the Columbia, Sir Robert Peel (built 1846), Patrick Henry (after her 1852 transfer from the Blue Swallowtail line), Prince Albert, Yorktown (1847), London (1848), and Rhine. Many of these ships were actually owned by the partners (in shares) individually, and not owned by the company itself.

As its business grew, the company's reputation expanded, even to Canada. In 1835, the Quebec Mercury commented on "[T]he exertions of Messrs. Grinnell, Minturn & Co. . . . to increase the efficiency of the London line" and called for "every encouragement on the part of those of our community who are in the habit of frequently crossing the Atlantic."

=== California Line ===
Later, when the discovery of gold in the Sierra Nevada made California a popular destination for travelers from the East Coast, the company founded a California Line of clippers. The demands of the voyage were such that larger ships were required, and the Flying Cloud (built 1851) was purchased for this route for the phenomenal sum of $90,000 before the ship was even launched. The ship set a record for the New York-to-San Francisco run around Cape Horn in 1851 (despite losing a portion of a mast en route), and improved on its own mark in 1853, setting a record for ships under sail that lasted for over 100 years. The Flying Cloud, like many of the line's ships, had individual ownership. Moses H. Grinnell and Robert Minturn each held 9/32 shares. Henry Grinnell, John E. Williams, and Francis S. Hathaway each held 4/32 shares. Captain Creesy held 2/32 shares.

=== Additional significance ===
Because of its extensive shipping operations, the company (and the Minturn family) was involved in a number of landmark legal cases having to do with ships and shipping, including Minturn v. United States and Lawrence v. Minturn. Another of these cases described the company as "Grinnell, Minturn & Co., large shipping merchants of New York".

Robert Minturn's first cousin, Edward Minturn, partnered with Albert Woodhull, to form Minturn & Woodhull, merchants, in the 1830s. In 1841, the firm launched Woodhull & Minturn's "New Line" of packet ships between New York and Liverpool, for a time headquartered at 87 South Street, New York, which eventually held twelve vessels. "Between 1842 and 1847, inclusive, twenty-nine new Western Ocean lines were formed," according to Queens of the Western Ocean: The Story of America's Mail and Passenger Sailing Lines. The firm's ships included the Hottinguer (1843, 993 tons), Captain Ira Bursley; Queen of the West (1844, 1,161 tons), Captain Woodhouse; Liverpool (1843, 1,077 tons), Captain John Eldridge; the Constitution (1846 by Brown & Bell, 1,327 tons), Captain John Britton. In 1845, they opened a line to Glasgow, Scotland. They sold their holdings to Grinnell, Minturn & Co. in about 1847. On January 12, 1850, the Hottinguer hit a bank off of Wexford, Ireland, near Tuskar Light, and was stranded. Capt. Bursley saved passengers but died, with twelve crew, after a failed rescue attempt.

The Grinnells partnered with John Bowman to form Bowman, Grinnell & Co., agents, which advertised remittance and baggage services, and as "the only authorized passenger agents for the SWALLOW-TAIL LINE OF PACKET SHIPS," with offices through the 1850s, in Liverpool, 5 Regent Road across from the Clarence dock gate, and Fenwick Chambers; in Cork, Ireland, 15 Merchants Quay; and in New York, 83 South Street.

In 1848, Grinnell, Minturn & Co. partner Robert Minturn provided evidence before Parliament that teetotalism was encouraged by American shipowners as underwriters offered "a return of 10% off the premium on voyages performed without the consumption of spirits."

Minturn died in 1866, Grinnell died in 1877 after which Minturn's sons, Robert Bowne Minturn, Jr., and John Wendell Minturn, became principals.

The firm ostensibly closed down a majority of its packet services by 1880.

The following year, John Wendell Minturn, aged 42 and the second-born son of Robert B. Minturn, committed suicide at the firm's New York headquarters at 78 South Street (1881).

== Miscellaneous information ==
The first name of Preserved Fish was properly pronounced with three syllables, and was a reference to being "preserved from sin" or "preserved in grace"; his family, prominent in New York, also gave rise to Hamilton Fish, governor, senator, and secretary of state.

Robert B. Minturn is an ancestor of Edie Sedgwick.

Robert B. Minturn, Jr. (born February 21, 1836) was also vice president of the railroad that founded the town of Minturn, Colorado, giving his name to that town.

== Bibliography ==
- Ross, Donald Gunn III. "Building and launching The New World". The Era of the Clipper Ships.
- Ross, Donald Gunn III. "Era of the Clipper Ships Web Site". Archived from the original on March 30, 2010.
