= John Lansing Wendell =

American judge (1785–1861)

- Born: 2 January 1785
- Died: 19 December 1861
- Children: Anna Mary Wendell Minturn
- Parents: Cornelis Wendell (father); Annatje Lansing (mother)

John Lansing Wendell (2 January 1785 – 19 December 1861) was an American judge.

== Biography ==
Wendell was born in Albany, New York, on 2 January 1785 and died in Hartford, Connecticut, on 19 December 1861, at 76. He was a descendant of one of the Dutch families of New York. He was educated in Albany and Cambridge, New York, and his family had moved to the latter place about 1795. He entered the law office of his brother, Gerritt Wendell, became a member of the Albany bar, subsequently judged Washington County, and was for many years a reporter for the supreme court of the state of New York.

== Publications ==
He published Reports of Cases in the Supreme Court of Judicature of New York, 1828-'41 (26 vols., Albany, 1829-'42), and Digest of Cases, Supreme Court of New York, 1828-'35 (1836); and edited Starkie's Law of Slander (2 vols., Albany, 1843), and Blackstone's Commentaries (4 vols., New York city, 1847).
