= Felice Stampfle =

American art historian

Felice Stampfle (25 July 1912 – 31 December 2000) was an American Curator of Drawings and Prints at the Morgan Library for nearly 40 years, and editor of the scholarly journal Master Drawings.

== Biography ==
Stampfle was born in Kansas City, Missouri, in 1912. She received a BA in Art History and an MA in Art and Archaeology from Washington University in St. Louis. She attended Paul Sach's training class “Museum Work and Museum Problems” at the Fogg Art Museum, Harvard University (1943–45). She was appointed the first Curator of Drawings and Prints at the Morgan Library by Pierpont Morgan's librarian and its first director, Belle da Costa Greene, in 1945.

As Curator, Stampfle oversaw acquisitions of art that more than doubled the size of the library's collection. She organised exhibitions that revealed the strengths of the collection, beginning in 1949 with an exhibition to showcase her discovery of more than 100 previously unknown sheets by Giovanni Battista Piranesi that had recently come to the Morgan from the collection of Frances Louise Tracey Morgan, wife of J. P. Morgan. In 1963, Stampfle founded the quarterly journal Master Drawings to promote the study and connoisseurship of drawings. She remained Editor until 1983. Beginning in 1965, Stampfle organized three seminal exhibitions of Italian drawings from New York collections in collaboration with Jacob Bean, curator of drawings at the Metropolitan Museum of Art.

Stampfle published widely on Dutch and Flemish art, and co-authored the catalogue to 'Rembrandt: Experimental Etcher', an exhibition organized in 1969 by the Morgan Library and the Museum of Fine Arts, Boston. In 1978, she published Giovanni Battista Piranesi: Drawings in the Pierpont Morgan Library, a catalogue of the Morgan's Piranesi drawings.

Stampfle retired in 1983, but continued to work on a large catalogue of the Morgan's fifteenth and sixteenth century Netherlandish drawings and seventeenth and eighteenth century Flemish drawings, published in 1991. Her catalogue, Dutch Drawings in the Pierpont Morgan Library: Seventeenth to Nineteenth Centuries. Vol. 2, was written with Jane Shoaf Turner and published in 2006. Art work by Rembrandt and Dürer were gifted to the Morgan in Stampfle's honour.

Stampfle was described by contemporaries as 'a formidable presence with a serious and unflappable demeanor'. She was a leader in a male-dominated field, and retained a formal manner - she was always addressed, even by her staff, as Miss Stampfle. She died at the age of 88 at her home in Kennet Square, Pennsylvania.
