= Bartholomew Voorsanger =

American architect (born 1937)

- Born: March 23, 1937 (age 89); Detroit, Michigan
- Occupation: Architect
- Awards: AIA Housing Award; Society of American Registered Architects, Pennsylvania, Design Award of Excellence, 2012; New York Art Commission, Office of the Mayor Award for Excellence in Design
- Practice: Voorsanger Architects PC
- Buildings: The National World War II Museum New Orleans, LA (formerly the D Day Museum); The United Arab Emirates National Military Museum, Abu Dhabi Mudon City, Dubai; Wildcat Ridge Residence, Aspen CO; Elli Tahari Offices, Milburn, NJ; Brooklyn Museum Master Plan Competition, Brooklyn, NY

Bartholomew Voorsanger (born March 23, 1937) is an American architect.

== Early life ==
Bartholomew (Bart) Voorsanger was born in Michigan and raised in San Francisco. He graduated with honors from Princeton University in 1960, and received his Masters in Architecture from Harvard University in 1964. He received a Doctor Honoris Causa from the University for Architecture and Urbanism “Ion Mincu” in Bucharest, Romania in 2005.

== Notable works ==
Beyond international and national recognition, the built public architecture of Bartholomew Voorsanger, such as the Garden Court at Pierpont Morgan Library (completed in 1994 - demolished 2001), as well as The Asia Society Museum overall and particularly its public space on the ground floor (completed in 2001), which represents a "fluid space where nature meets high tech"; have received steady acclaim from the general public.

His residential buildings include consistent elements designed to capture nature and light through carefully calibrated and restrained architectonic gestures, and bringing them inside his houses, wherever they may be: Colorado, Arizona, Virginia, California, or Dubai. Often inspired by Frederic Edwin Church's depiction of the landscape of the Americas.

The New York architect Voorsanger received a bachelor's degree with Honors from Princeton University, a master's degree in Architecture from Harvard University, and accepted in 2005 the title of Doctor Honoris Causa from the University of Architecture and Urbanism “Ion Mincu”, Bucharest, Romania. Prior to opening his practice, Voorsanger worked for three years with urban planner Vincent Ponte in Montreal, Quebec, Canada, followed by a decade as an Associate with I.M. Pei & Partners in New York.

The firm Voorsanger & Mills (est. 1978), was restructured as Voorsanger Architects PC in 1990, with Voorsanger as the Principal of the firm responsible for the design. Voorsanger’s architecture projects have been published widely both nationally and internationally, in volumes, magazines, and articles. Earlier projects include studies for New York University, such as Midtown Center (with Edward Mills), the Graduate and Undergraduate dormitories, and the Center for Advanced Digital Studies. Notable later projects include the International Competition for The Brooklyn Museum Master Plan, The Pierpont Morgan Library Garden Court, Eugenio Maria de Hostos Community College (with Hirsch Danois Architects), the Air Traffic Control Tower at LaGuardia, the Asia Society and Museum in New York, Terminal B at Newark International Airport, and the Master Plan for the University of Virginia Art Museum.

Among the notable residential projects, the firm has built are: Wildcat Ridge in Snowmass, Colorado, the Blue Ridge Residence in Charlottesville, villa in Tucson, villas and apartment complex in Dubai and just completed residence in the Napa Valley. A major public building, the National World War II Museum in New Orleans, was commissioned as a result of a competition. The first three phases (with Mathes Brierre Architects) have been completed and already open to the public; additional phases are still under construction. with additional phases under construction. In the new National Military Museum in Abu Dhabi of the United Arab Emirates design competition, Voorsanger's proposal has been selected.

The Firm’s projects have been recognized internationally, nationally, and locally through the numerous awards and exhibitions at prestigious museums and galleries, which include the Museum of Modern Art in New York, the Frankfurt Museum of Architecture, the Museum of Finnish Architecture, Ministerio de Obras Publicas Gallery in Madrid/Spain, the AA School of Architecture in London, Harvard University, the Hudson River Museum, the National Academy of Design, the AIA/NYC Center for Architecture, and New York University.

Voorsanger, a Fellow of the AIA since 1985, has served on national and international design awards juries and has been a speaker at numerous professional symposia. He has authored many articles published in national and international design and art periodicals, in addition to academic lectures, juries, and adjunct faculty appointments at the Rhode Island School of Design, Harvard University, Columbia University, and the University of Pennsylvania. The architect’s interest in public service translated into past involvements such as Chair of the Board of Advisors of the Temple Hoyne Buell Center for the Study of American Architecture at Columbia University, President of the AIA/New York Chapter, and the New York Foundation for Architecture. In addition, he has served as a member of the editorial board of the Harvard University Graduate School of Design Magazine, Chair of Design Review for the Port Authority of New York & New Jersey, and on the Board of the Society of Architectural Historians.

In late 2016, Oro Press published a monograph on Voorsanger's life and work, UNFOLDED: How Architecture Saved My Life, written by Alastair Gordon.

== Selected Projects ==
- The United Arab Emirates National Military Museum, Abu Dhabi
- Mudon City, Dubai
- Napa Valley Residence, Napa, California
- The National World War II Museum (with Mathes Brierre Architects), New Orleans, Louisiana (formerly the D Day Museum)
- Olana Museum & Visitor Center, Hudson, New York
- University of Virginia Art Museum, Charlottesville, Virginia
- Elie Tahari Fashion Design Office, Milburn, NJ
- Asia Society & Museum, New York, NY
- Wildcat Ridge Residence, Snowmass, Colorado
- Blue Ridge Residence, Charlottesville, Virginia
- Coronado Ridge Residence, Tucson, Arizona
- Birch Creek Residence, Lima Montana
- Waldron Residence, Martha’s Vineyard
- LaGuardia Air Traffic Control Tower, New York, NY
- JFK Airport/Impact Studies of AGT
- Pedestrian Distribution Systems to Selected Terminals
- The Pierpont Morgan Library Master Plan and Expansion
- Brooklyn Museum Master Plan Competition
- AGT Project/Port Authority (Monorail) Manhattan-JFK
- CBS Theatrical Film
- Friede Residence
- Eugenio Maria de Hostos Community College Allied Health Complex (with Hirsch Danois Architects), Bronx, New York
- Park Tower Reality
- Le Cygne Restaurant
- AGT Project/Port Authority: (Monorail) Environmental, Impact Statement
- NYC/AIA Headquarters
- New York University: Graduate & Undergraduate Dormitories
- New York University Midtown Center

== Select Awards ==
Napa Valley Residence

The Chicago Athenaeum & The European Centre for Architecture Art Design
The American Architecture Award

The National World War II Museum

Society of American Registered Architects, Pennsylvania,
Design Award of Excellence, 2012
The Chicago Athenaeum & The European Centre for Architecture Art Design, The American Architecture Award
The Precast/Prestressed Concrete Institute Design Award

Wildcat Ridge Residence Snowmass, Colorado

Residential Architect Grand Award
American Institute of Architects (AIA) Housing Award
American Institute of Architects/NY State Merit Award
American Institute of Architects/NYC Merit Award
The National Academy of Design
2007 Lenard Kester Annual Prize & The Samuel F.B. Morse Medal

Blue Ridge Residence Charlottesville, Virginia

American Institute of Architects/NY State Excellence Award
American Institute of Architects/NYC Merit Award

Elie Tahari Fashion Design Offices & Warehouse

Chicago Athenaeum American Architecture Award
National AIA Interior Architecture Award
American Institute of Architects/New Jersey Honor Award
American Institute of Architects/NYC Merit Award

Asia Society and Museum

The National Academy of Design, Cannon Prize

Hostos Community College Allied Health Complex

The American Institute of Architects National Honor Award
New York Art Commission, Office of the Mayor Award for Excellence in Design
New York State Association of Architects Design Award
City Club of New York: Albert S. Bard Award

Le Cygne Restaurant

Interiors Magazine Fifth Annual Interiors Award
American Institute of Architects New York Chapter
Architecture Magazine National Design Award
AIA/NYC Chapter Distinguished Architecture Citation

NYU Graduate School of Business

Administration Library National AIA Library Buildings Award

NYU Midtown Center

NY State Association of Architects Excellence in Design Award

Pierpont Morgan Library

Landmarks Preservation Commission Award
Tucker Award of Design Excellence, Building Stone Institute

Waldron House, Martha’s Vineyard, Mass.

American Institute of Architects National Better Homes for Living Competition
