= Morgan Library & Museum =

Institution in Manhattan, New York

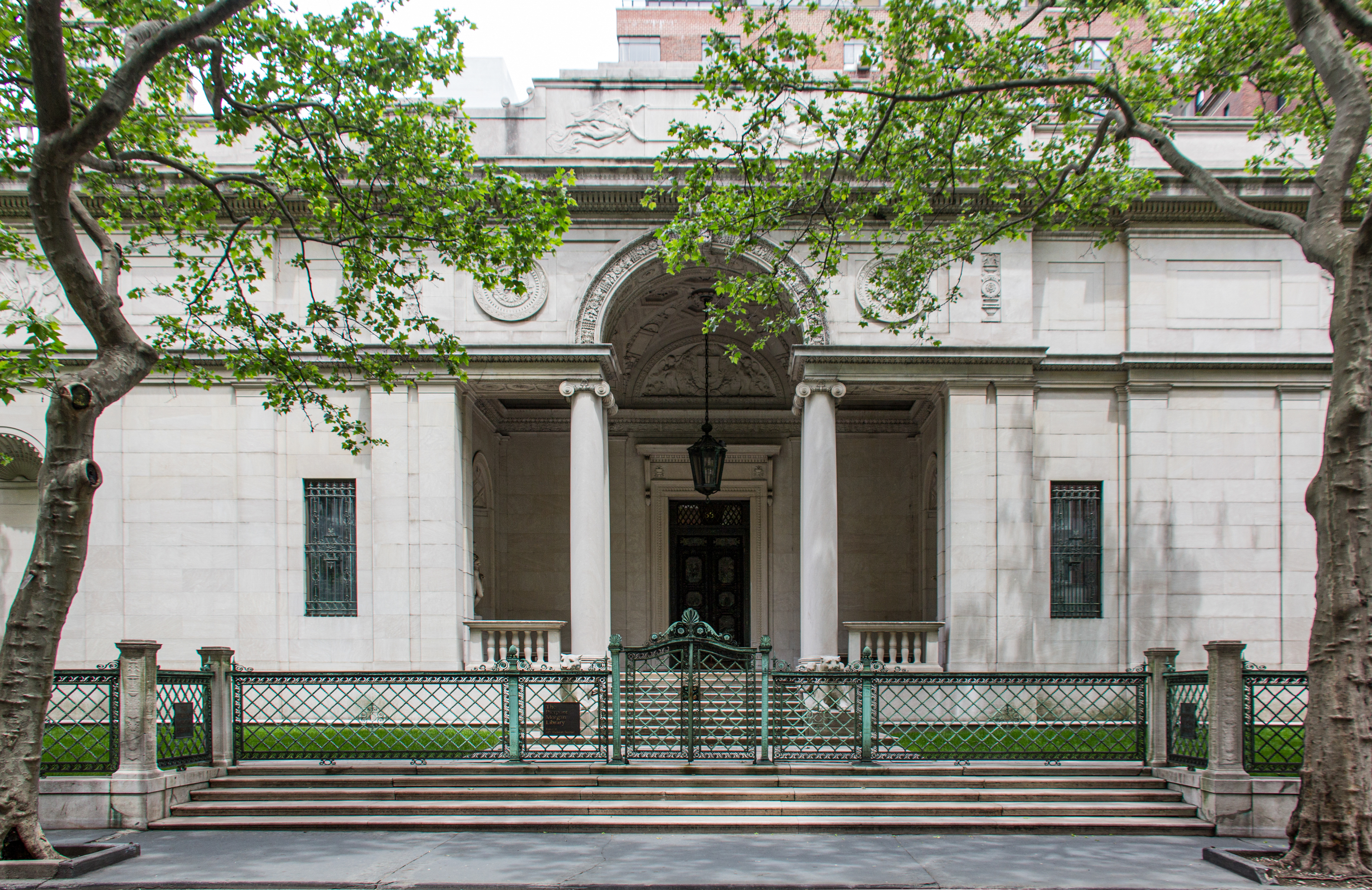
- The museum's entrance in 2017
- Former name: Pierpont Morgan Library
- Established: 1906 (private library); March 28, 1924 (public institution)
- Location: 225 Madison Avenue (at East 36th Street), Manhattan, New York, U.S.
- Coordinates: 40°44′57″N 73°58′53″W
- Type: Museum and research library
- Collection size: 350,000
- Visitors: 274,000 (fiscal year 2019)
- Founder: J. P. Morgan
- Director: Colin B. Bailey
- Architects: Charles Follen McKim (main building); Benjamin Wistar Morris (main building annex); Isaac Newton Phelps (231 Madison Avenue); Renzo Piano and Beyer Blinder Belle (expansion)
- Public transit access: Subway: at Grand Central–42nd Street at 33rd Street; Bus: M1, M2, M3, M4, M34 SBS, M34A SBS, M42, Q32
- Website: themorgan.org
- J. Pierpont Morgan Library
- U.S. National Register of Historic Places
- U.S. National Historic Landmark
- U.S. Historic district – Contributing property
- New York State Register of Historic Places
- New York City Landmark
- Part of: Murray Hill Historic District (ID03000997)
- NRHP reference No.: 66000544
- NYSRHP No.: 06101.000434
- NYCL No.: 0239, 1119, 2114

Significant dates
- Added to NRHP: November 13, 1966 (main building)
- Designated NHL: November 13, 1966 (main building)
- Designated CP: February 27, 2013
- Designated NYSRHP: June 23, 1980
- Designated NYCL: May 17, 1966 (main building exterior); March 23, 1982 (main building interior); February 26, 2002 (231 Madison Avenue exterior)

The Morgan Library & Museum (formerly the Pierpont Morgan Library; colloquially the Morgan) is a museum and research library in New York City, New York, United States. Completed in 1906 as the private library of the banker J. P. Morgan, the institution is housed at 225 Madison Avenue in the Murray Hill neighborhood of Manhattan. As of 2024, the museum is directed by Colin B. Bailey and governed by a board of trustees.

The site was formerly occupied by several Phelps family residences, one of which was sold to J. P. Morgan in 1880. After collecting thousands of objects in the late 19th century, Morgan erected the main building between 1902 and 1906, with Belle da Costa Greene serving as its first librarian for more than four decades. The library was made a public institution in 1924 by J. P. Morgan's son John Pierpont Morgan Jr., in accordance with his father's will, and further expansions were completed in 1928, 1962, and 1991. The Morgan Library was renamed the Morgan Library & Museum after the completion of a major expansion in 2006. Further renovations were completed in 2010 and 2022.

The Morgan Library & Museum is composed of several structures. The main building was designed by Charles McKim of the firm of McKim, Mead and White, with an annex designed by Benjamin Wistar Morris. A 19th-century Italianate brownstone house at 231 Madison Avenue, built by Isaac Newton Phelps, is also part of the grounds. The complex includes three additional structures, including a glass entrance building designed by Renzo Piano and Beyer Blinder Belle. The main building and its interior is a New York City designated landmark and a National Historic Landmark, while the house at 231 Madison Avenue is a designated city landmark.

The Morgan Library & Museum's collection has more than 350,000 objects, which include illuminated manuscripts, authors' original manuscripts, books, and sheets of music. The Morgan also houses collections of drawings, photographs, paintings, maps, and other objects. In addition to its permanent collection, the museum has hosted temporary exhibitions, as well as events such as concerts and lectures. Both the collection and the original building's architecture have received praise over the years, while the annexes' architecture has received mixed commentary.

== History ==
=== Background ===
==== Phelps Stokes/Dodge houses ====
In the second half of the 19th century, the Morgan Library & Museum's site was occupied by four brownstone houses on the east side of Madison Avenue, between 36th Street to the south and 37th Street to the north. The houses were all built in 1852 or 1853 by members of the Phelps Stokes/Dodge merchant family. Three houses were built along Madison Avenue on lots measuring 65 feet (20 m) wide by 157 feet (48 m) deep, while a fourth house to the east measured 18 feet (5.5 m) wide and stretched 197.5 feet (60.2 m) between 37th and 36th Streets. All the houses were designed in an Italianate style with pink brownstone. A driveway and stables were located behind the homes. The Madison Avenue houses, from north to south, were owned by Isaac Newton Phelps, William E. Dodge, and John Jay Phelps, while the 37th Street house was owned by George D. Phelps. The houses were separated from each other by gardens. The surrounding neighborhood of Murray Hill was not yet developed at the time, but began to grow after the American Civil War.

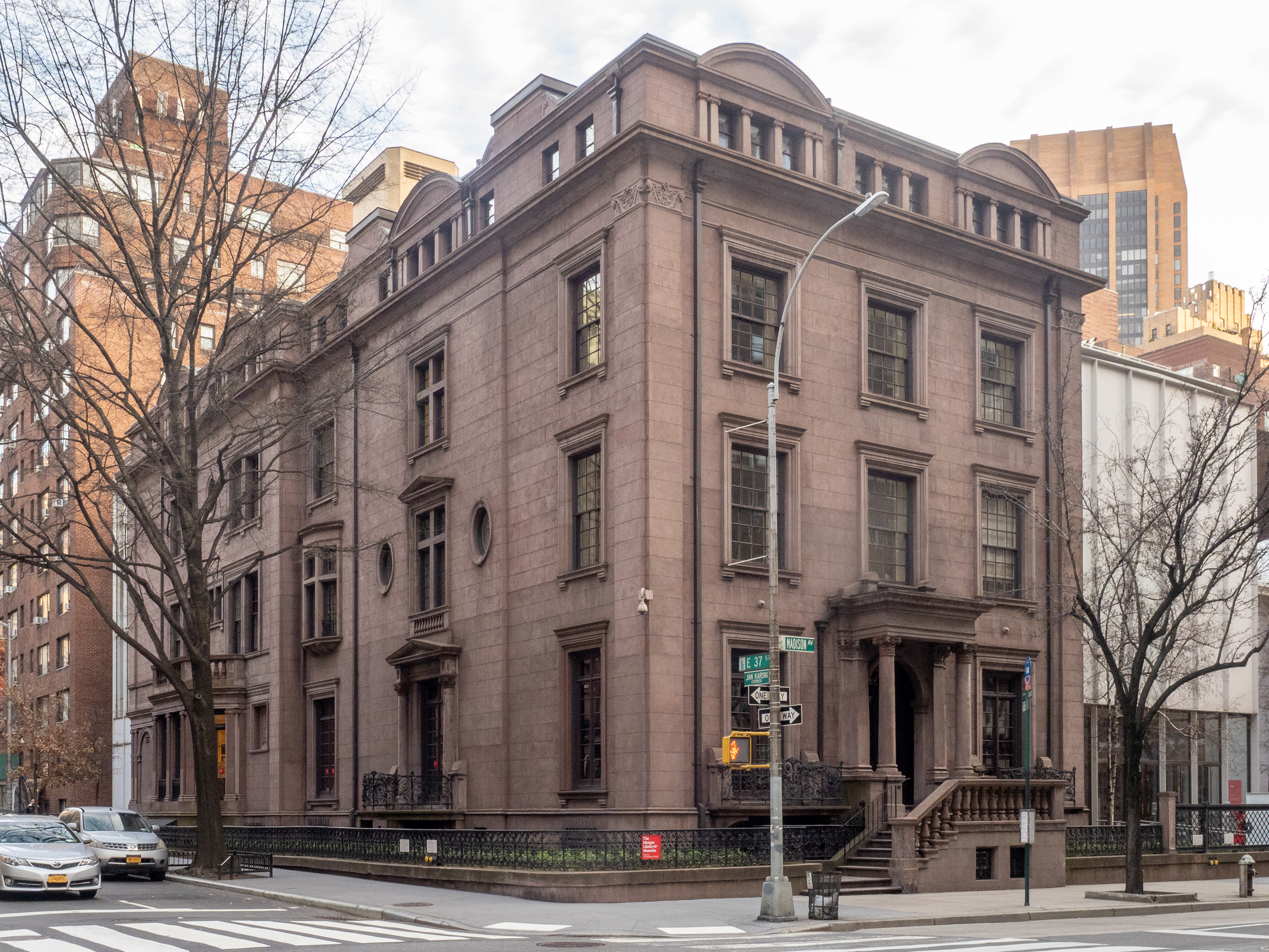
The Isaac Newton Phelps house at 231 Madison Avenue predates the rest of the Morgan Library & Museum.

Isaac Newton Phelps's daughter Helen married Anson Phelps Stokes in 1865. Their son, the architect Isaac Newton Phelps Stokes, was born in the Isaac Newton Phelps house at 231 Madison Avenue two years later. Helen Phelps inherited the house following her father's death. In 1888, she doubled the size of her house and added an attic; the architect R. H. Robertson designed the expansion.

The banker John Pierpont Morgan, who lived at 6 East 40th Street in the 1870s, was looking to buy his own house by 1880. He wished to live in Murray Hill, where many of his and his wife's friends and business contacts lived. Morgan sought to buy John Jay Phelps's house at 219 Madison Avenue, at the corner with 36th Street, which was offered for $225,000. He acquired the house in 1880 and renovated it over the following two years, moving there in 1882. The exterior design was largely retained, but the interior was extensively renovated by the Herter Brothers.

==== Morgan collection ====
Morgan had collected handwriting samples as early as the 1850s, and he also acquired pictures and stained glass pieces throughout the years. In the late 19th century, Morgan became one of the most influential financiers in the United States. As his wealth grew, Morgan amassed a collection of fine art, inspired by the collection of his father Junius Spencer Morgan, and he also began collecting rare books and other bindings at his nephew Junius's suggestion. The fine art was subject to import taxes and was stored in England; since books were not subject to import taxes, they were stored in the basement of his New York residence. J. P. Morgan's collection included 160 titles by 1883.

The collection grew quickly after his father died in 1890. Morgan began acquiring historically important manuscripts after his father obtained Walter Scott's original manuscript of the book Guy Mannering. From 1899 to 1902 alone, he took over three collectors' libraries, which included hundreds of illuminated manuscripts, prints, and other manuscripts. Morgan also acquired smaller collections, such as French literature, medieval chivalry, and American manuscript collections. Morgan may have collected these objects exclusively for pleasure and not for investment purposes. Morgan brought his art collection to the U.S. because an 1897 law allowed him to do it without paying import taxes, and also because he wanted to preserve the objects for the American people.

=== Development of library ===
By 1900, Morgan's collection took up more space than was available in his residence, and his son-in-law described the basement as being packed with piles of objects. Some of his collection had to be stored at the Lenox Library. Morgan was unable to expand the house due to an 18-foot-wide (5.5 m) driveway east of it. While part of Morgan's collection was stored in the basement of his house, other items were loaned to institutions or placed in storage.

==== Site acquisition ====
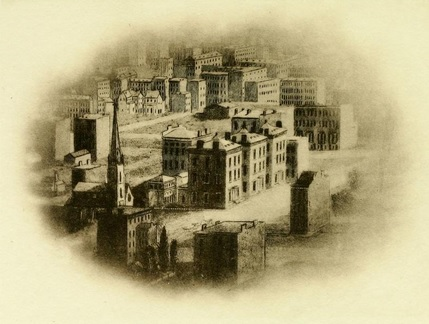
Early view (c. 1855) of 229, 225 and 219 Madison Avenue before the street was paved

In 1900, the plots north and east of J. P. Morgan's house were placed for sale after the death of Melissa Stokes Dodge, who lived in the Dodge mansion just north of Morgan's house. That January, he bought a 75-by-100-foot (23 by 30 m) plot of land on 36th Street, for a library. The site had been occupied by two brownstone homes at 35 and 37 East 36th Street, which Morgan promptly razed. In 1902, Morgan acquired two more lots on 36th Street with a total frontage of 50 feet (15 m). On the far eastern side of that plot, McKim, Mead & White designed a six-story house at 33 East 36th Street for Morgan's daughter Louisa and her husband Herbert Satterlee. The Satterlees' house was made of limestone, as contrasted with the brownstones on Madison Avenue, and was connected to Morgan's own home by tunnels. The Satterlee residence measured 28 feet (8.5 m) wide, and Morgan used the 135-foot-wide (41 m) plot between his house and the Satterlees' home for his new library.

Morgan acquired William E. Dodge's home in April 1903. While the Satterlee house was under construction, the couple moved into the Dodge mansion. By late 1904, Morgan had also purchased the old Isaac Newton Stokes house at 229 Madison Avenue for his son J. P. Morgan Jr., who was known as "Jack". Jack initially lived nearby at 22 Park Avenue. When Jack and his wife Jane Norton Grew moved into 229 Madison Avenue in 1905, he commissioned a major renovation of the interior and renumbered it as 231 Madison Avenue. Jack Morgan also performed $1,900 in changes to the house's exterior. J. P. Morgan came to own two-thirds of the city block; his holdings by 1907 included the whole 197.5-foot (60.2 m) frontage on Madison Avenue, stretching 300 feet (91 m) on 36th Street and 167 feet (51 m) on 37th Street.

==== Construction ====
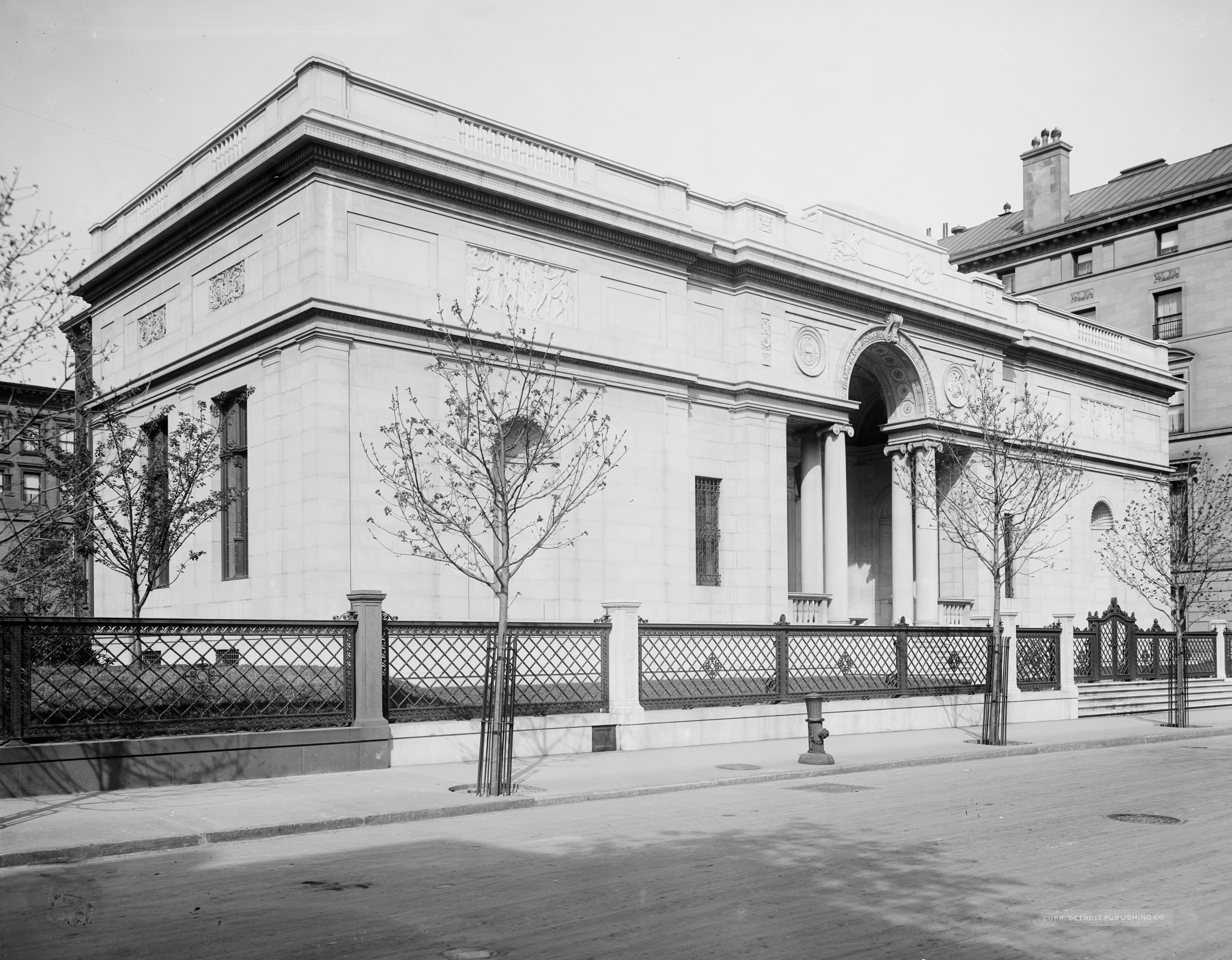
The library c. 1910, shortly after its completion

Morgan first hired Warren and Wetmore to design a Baroque-style library, which would have had a heavily decorated upper section. Whitney Warren of Warren and Wetmore had then just completed the elaborately decorated New York Yacht Club Building, and Warren had wanted to design a domed structure. Morgan's preference for an austere structure may have led him to reject Warren and Wetmore. He instead hired Charles McKim of McKim, Mead & White to design the library in 1902. C. T. Wills was hired as the builder. The library was to be a classical marble structure with a simple design; Morgan had told McKim that he wanted "a gem". McKim's designs were traditional for their time, while those who wanted more fashionable designs typically hired McKim's partner Stanford White.

At the time of the library's planning, restrictive covenants in Murray Hill prohibited the construction of museums there, but the library was originally not planned as a museum. While McKim was responsible for the overall design, Morgan had final say over the aspects of the plan. An initial proposal called for a projecting central mass flanked by recessed wings, which Morgan deemed unwieldy. The second version of the plan reduced the size of the central mass and added a recessed entrance. Morgan also rejected a proposal for a Greek temple–like structure topped by a portico. The final designs called for the central section and wings to be the same distance from the street. Morgan insisted the library be made of marble, even though his whole family except for his daughter Louisa lived in a brownstone house. Morgan originally planned to use white marble, but he used pinkish-gray Tennessee marble instead after a neighbor told him that white marble would make the building look like a mausoleum.

By early 1903, workers were laying the foundation for the library. Construction began that April, and the library was being dubbed as "Mr. Morgan's jewel case" by the next year. Few details of the library were given out during construction, as Morgan prohibited the workers from talking to the press. The Wall Street Journal reported in June 1906 that Morgan had "wanted the most perfect structure that human hands could erect and was willing to pay whatever it cost". For example, the usage of dry masonry marble blocks, an uncommon construction method that eliminated the need for joints made of mortar, added $50,000 to the cost of construction. McKim had suggested the dry masonry blocks to Morgan, who readily agreed to pay the extra cost. To fit New York City's climate, tinfoil sheeting was placed between the blocks. In addition, the stonework contractor nearly went out of business because the builders would not use any stones with cracks.

Morgan was impressed with the quality of the work and often upheld the library as an accomplishment of McKim's. This was because McKim was not only responsible for selecting the marble from Rome but also for hiring the library's decorators and craftsmen. The final design was more representative of the work of William M. Kendall from McKim, Mead & White. Morgan acquired two hundred cases of books, which were temporarily stored in the Lenox Library and moved to Morgan's personal library starting in December 1905. Around the same time, Morgan hired Belle da Costa Greene as his personal librarian; she remained in charge of the collection for the next four decades. Toward the library's completion, Morgan reportedly requested that the entire library be shortened by one foot.

=== Private library ===
==== Opening and early years ====
Morgan first used his office in November 1906 with a reception for the Metropolitan Museum of Art's purchasing committee. The decorative details were not completed until January 1907, and the collection was relocated into the library later that year. Morgan's library had cost $1.2 million (equivalent to $31.305 million in 2024 (Note: Johnston, Louis; Williamson, Samuel H. (2023). "What Was the U.S. GDP Then?". MeasuringWorth. United States Gross Domestic Product deflator figures follow the MeasuringWorth series.)). During the Panic of 1907, the presidents of the city's banks and trust companies were locked in the library overnight until they agreed on a plan to stop the financial crisis. To allow people to see his new library from Madison Avenue, Morgan demolished the Dodge house in 1907–1908 and replaced it with a garden designed by Beatrix Farrand.

As the librarian, Greene was tasked with expanding the collection, as well as cataloging and researching the history of each item. She frequently searched for rare volumes in back alleys, but initially tended to avoid auctions and rarely spent more than $10,000 on a book without permission. Greene tended to acquire items created before the 16th century, since Morgan believed that other libraries were able to adequately care for newer items. Morgan also decided to import the rest of his collection and display it at his library. To avoid paying import taxes, he was required to open the library to the public on certain days of the week. Morgan sometimes acquired art on short notice; in one case, he bought a Vermeer painting minutes after learning about the artist. He also refused to buy works that he believed were too expensive, and, although Morgan sometimes bought whole collections, in other instances he acquired a small number of pieces from a collection.

Morgan frequently met with foreign bankers in the library's study, and he often opted to work in the library rather than in his downtown office. Among Morgan's larger acquisitions in the late 1900s and early 1910s was a collection of rare American authors' manuscripts from merchant S. H. Wakeman in 1909. The Wall Street Journal wrote in 1911 that "Mr. Morgan buys books as some financiers buy a thousand shares of stock"; in some years, he spent half his income on the collection. Acquisitions continued until his death in March 1913. Morgan had bought thousands of objects since 1899, including 600 manuscripts and 3,000 medieval items.

==== After J. P. Morgan's death ====
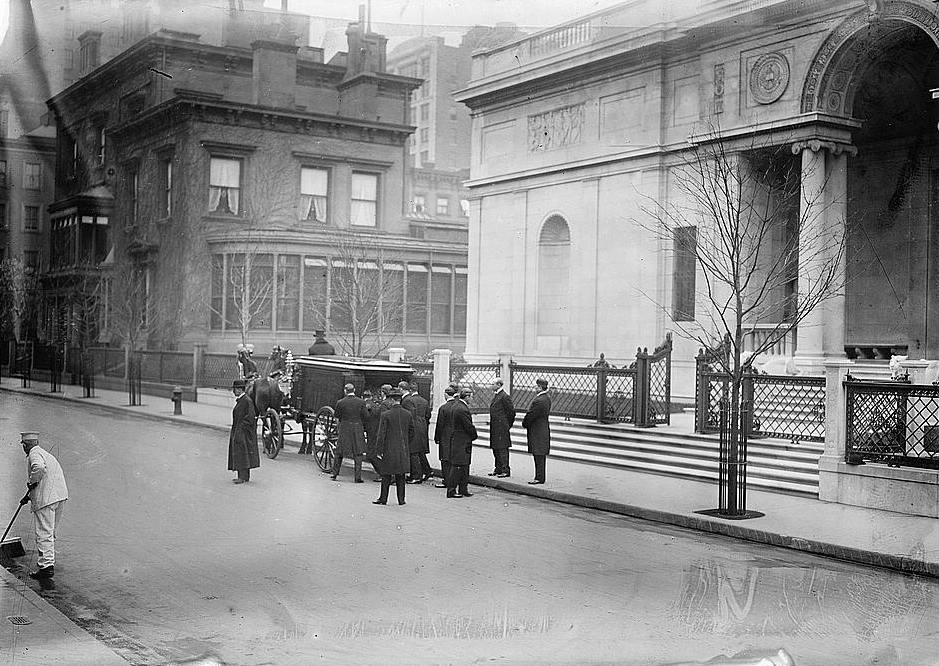
J. P. Morgan's body being brought to his home and library after his death in Rome

Morgan's estate was valued at $128 million (about $2.980 billion in 2024), over half of which lay in the worth of his collection. J. P. Morgan bequeathed all except one piece in the collection to the library, with the request that Jack make the collection "permanently available for the instruction and pleasure of the American people". The month after J. P. Morgan's death, the New York state legislature granted a two-year exemption enabling Jack to import his father's overseas collection without having to pay import duties. Jack did not publicly show interest in his father's art collection and reportedly did not expand it in the year after his father died. Jack sold off much of the overseas collection rather than importing it, but he decided to keep the items that were already in his father's library. During 1914, the collection was displayed in full at the Metropolitan Museum of Art, the only time the whole collection was displayed.

The import duty exemption expired in April 1915, and Jack sold various items in the collection to pay the inheritance taxes and to raise money for the cash bequests in his father's will. The next year, the collection was valued at $7.5 million for taxation purposes. Jack and Jane Morgan continued to employ Greene as the librarian, adding items that personally interested them. Frances Morgan, Jack's mother and John Pierpont's widow, lived at J. P. Morgan's old residence until her death in November 1924. By then, despite Jack's opposition, the surrounding stretch of Madison Avenue was being redeveloped as a business street. Although Jane Morgan died in 1925, Jack continued to live at 231 Madison Avenue until his death in 1943, and the Satterlee home remained in the Morgan family until 1944. The United Lutheran Church in America bought 231 Madison Avenue for its headquarters in 1943 and built a five-story annex there in 1957, after demolishing an old carriage house behind the residence. 231 Madison Avenue was the only remaining brownstone house along the Murray Hill section of Madison Avenue by the 1960s.

=== Public institution ===
==== 1920s to 1940s ====
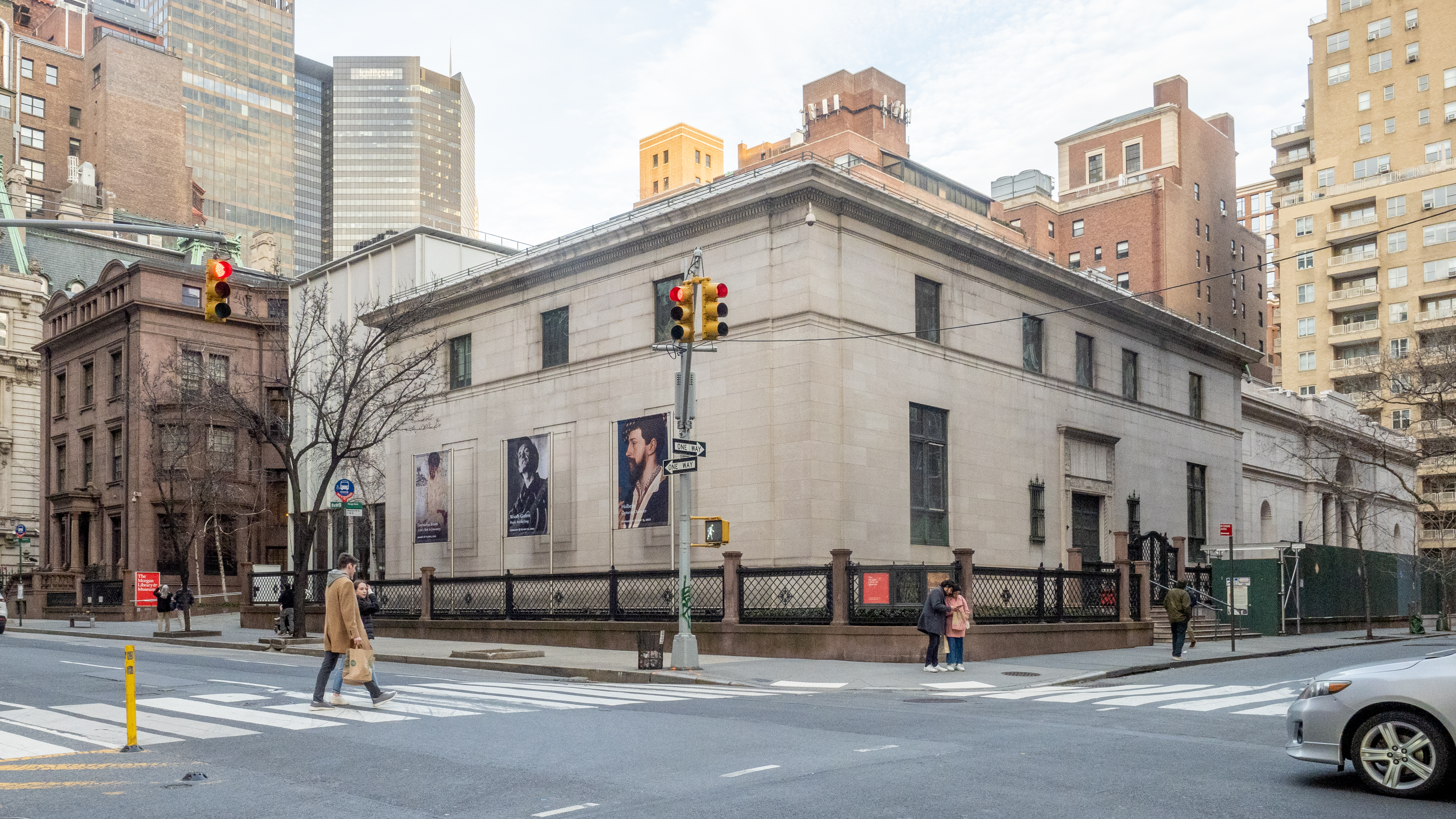
The 1928 annex

The Pierpont Morgan Library was incorporated as a public institution in March 1924, a month after Jack Morgan announced that he would transfer the collection to a board of trustees and provide a $1.5 million endowment for the library. The library's name reflected the fact that the elder J. P. Morgan had disliked being called by his first name and even his first initial. The Morgans transferred the library building, and the land under 219 Madison Avenue, to the Morgan Library. Greene was retained as the librarian. The Morgan Library was not a public library and initially only allowed researchers into the space; as Jack Morgan said, "one soiled thumb could undo the work of 900 years". Only ten scholars could initially enter the building at once. The library's collection continued to grow, with emphasis placed on rare items; for example, though only four items were acquired in 1926, all of these were unique manuscripts.

To accommodate additional scholars, the Morgan Library announced plans for an annex in January 1927. Though Jack initially denied that 219 Madison Avenue would be demolished, that house was ultimately razed. Benjamin Wistar Morris was hired to design the annex, while Marc Eidlitz & Son was hired to build it. The annex was completed in 1928. The Morgan Library continued to expand its collections; for instance, between 1936 and 1940, it acquired twelve manuscripts and dozens of drawings. In the 25 years after it became a public institution, the Morgan Library acquired 200 total manuscripts, 83 books, and hundreds of autographed letters and papers.

Through the early 1940s, the Morgan Library continued to limit access only to researchers, prompting city officials to request that the library's tax-exempt status be removed because it was not a public library. In December 1942, Morgan Library officials agreed to open the library to the general public, and city officials agreed not to fight the library's tax-exempt status. Many of the library's most valuable artifacts were transported to other locations in the U.S. in 1942 to protect them from possible World War II airstrikes; the objects were returned to the library in December 1944. The Fellows of the Pierpont Morgan Library was formed in 1949 to raise funds for the collections and distribute funds to scholars and publications. After Belle da Costa Greene retired from the library in 1948, Frederick Baldwin Adams Jr. was appointed as the Morgan's second director.

==== 1950s to mid-1980s ====
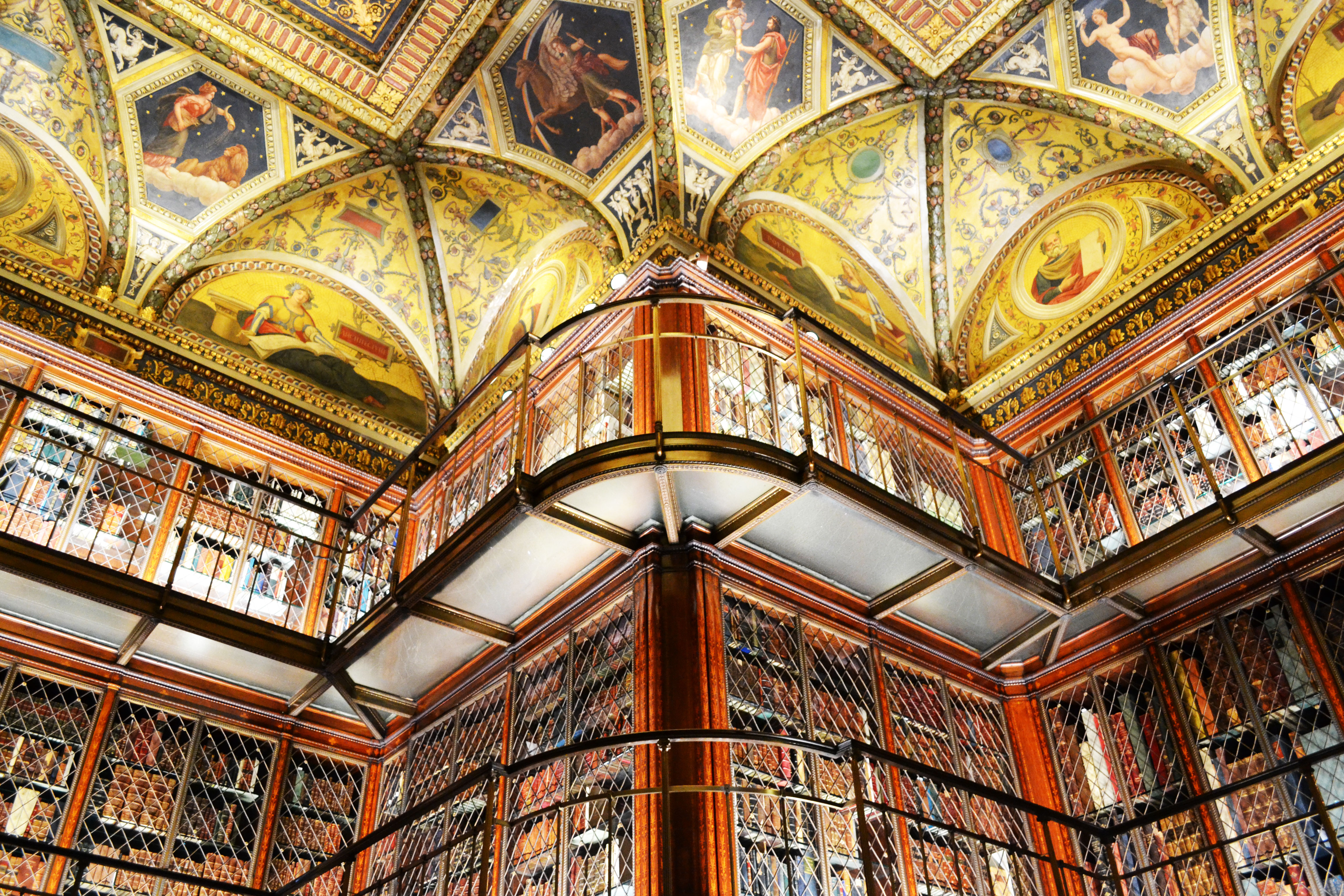
Interior of the East Library

The Morgan Library started to host concerts and tours during the 1950s, and it also acquired items such as a collection of 1,375 letters from a British dealer. Officials began raising $3 million for an expansion of the library in 1959; the money was to fund modifications to the annex and a new lecture hall, as well as artifact purchases and new programs. By that November, the library had raised $550,000. In 1960, the main library and its annex were connected by a cloister structure. During the renovation, the operating hours of the east room and west room were expanded from three to six days a week. The renovation, designed by J. P. Morgan's nephew Alexander P. Morgan, was completed in 1962 and included office space, a gallery, and meeting space. In total, the renovation cost $1.4 million. By the early 1960s, the library was open six days a week (five days during the summer), and it charged no admission fee. Access to parts of the collection was limited to authorized researchers.

Adams retired as the Morgan's director in 1969 and was succeeded by Charles Ryskamp. During Ryskamp's 17-year tenure, the $11 million endowment was expanded to $38 million. By the early 1970s, the Morgan Library had several hundred fellows, or members, and Ryskamp wanted to attract more visitors to the library. The Morgan Library constructed a five-story addition with storage vaults and offices in 1975.

The library continued to acquire other collections in the 1970s and 1980s, including the musical manuscript collection of Mary Flagler Cary; 1,500 Italian drawings from János Scholz; Dannie Heineman's collection of letters, books, and newspaper clippings; part of Robin Lehman's music manuscript collection; and 75 rare manuscripts from William S. Glazier. Ryskamp also arranged various temporary exhibitions. During the 1980s, the library raised $1.5 million each year for its operating budget, in addition to funding for repairs. The institution received a $1 million grant for the preservation of its printed books (the largest donation it had ever received at the time) and a $600,000 matching grant for its conservation department in 1981. In the mid-1980s, the institution was officially renamed the Morgan Library.

==== 1980s and 1990s expansion ====
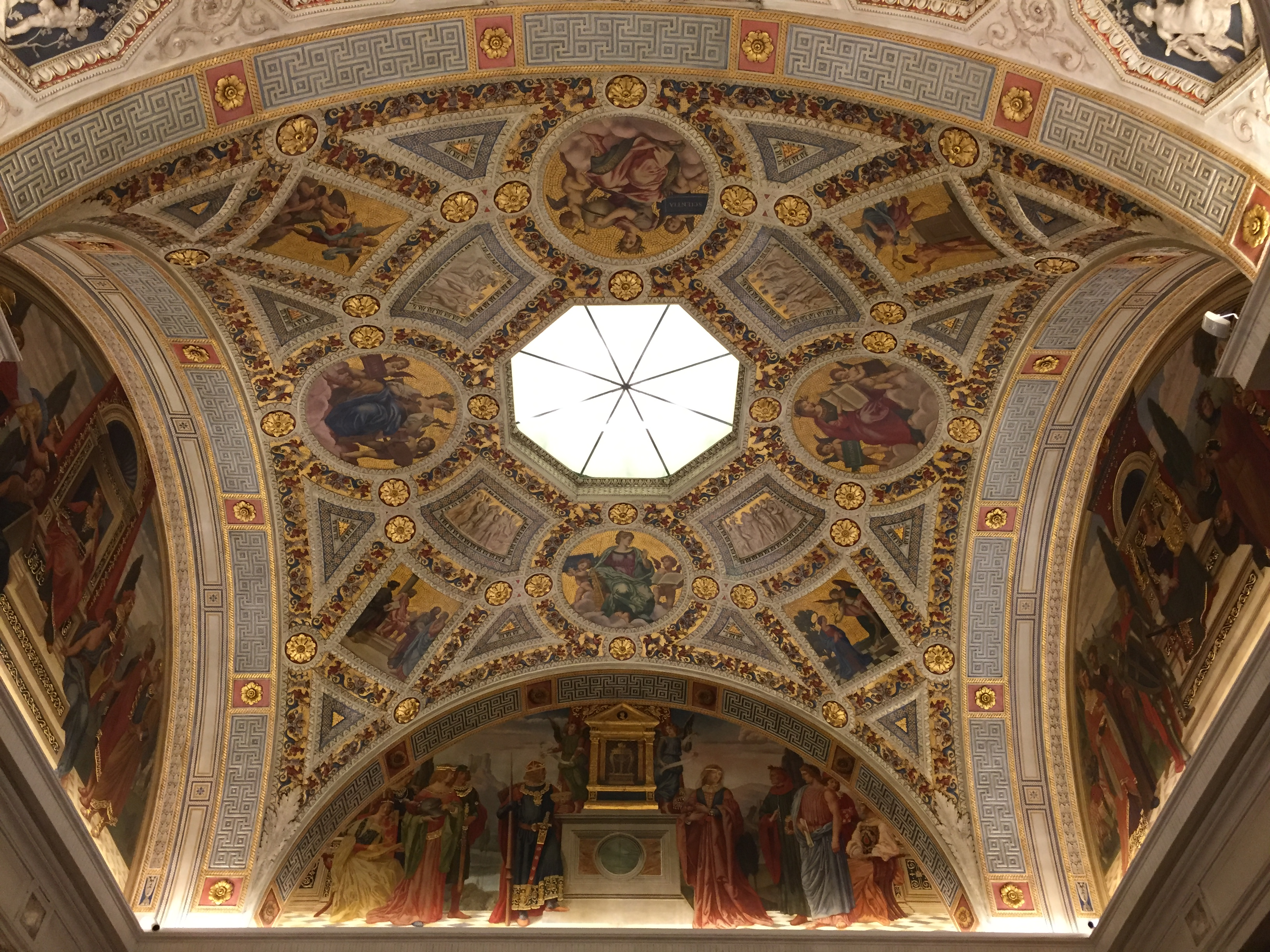
Ceiling of the main building's rotunda

Ryskamp resigned as director in 1986 and was replaced the next year by Charles Eliot Pierce Jr. Pierce was the first director of the Morgan who was not associated with Princeton University. After he was appointed, Pierce sought to attract visitors; he would later recall that he was "disconcerted" by reports that previous visitors had been turned away from the library. In 1988, the Morgan Library bought 231 Madison Avenue from the Lutheran Church for $15 million. The library planned to spend $5 million restoring the house, and it also announced that it would raise $40 million for a capital campaign. The original buildings could display only one percent of the total collection at once, and the entire exhibition space consisted of two rooms and a corridor.

In 1989, the firm of Voorsanger and Mills designed a glass conservatory connecting 231 Madison Avenue and the main building's annex. The conservatory would expand the library's space to 45,000 square feet (4,200 m^{2}), add a walled terrace on Madison Avenue, and make the structures wheelchair-accessible. Because the original building was a city landmark, the New York City Landmarks Preservation Commission (LPC) had to approve the plans. An early plan called for converting 231 Madison Avenue to exhibition galleries, but the house's internal structure made this impossible, so 231 Madison Avenue became offices and a bookstore. The library's artworks were also extensively cleaned, display cases were added to the original East Library, and the West Study was opened to the public. The expansion was finished in October 1991, initially with 275 pieces from the permanent collection, along with temporary exhibition space in the main building. The project was originally planned to cost $9–10 million, but it ultimately cost either $15 million or $30 million. The Morgan finished raising $40 million in November 1992.

Visitor numbers had increased by the mid-1990s, and the library had pay-what-you-wish admission fees. At the time, the library still had a reputation for being a rich enclave, and many board members were part of rich families. The library's acquisitions in the 1990s included part of Alice Tully's art collection, Carter Burden's collection of over 30,000 American literary volumes, and Pierre Matisse's collection of 2,000 letters from artists. The Morgan opened a drawing center on the second floor of the annex, designed by Beyer Blinder Belle, in 1999. The same year, the Morgan received $10 million from Eugene V. Thaw and Clare E. Thaw; these funds were used to establish the Thaw Conservation Center, completed in 2002. By the beginning of the 21st century, the library's facilities had become dated. Pierce said later: "We had a lecture hall, not a concert hall; a reading room that owed more to 1928 instead of 2006."

==== 2000s expansion ====
The Morgan's board began planning another expansion in the late 1990s. The board hosted an architectural design competition and selected three finalists, all of whose plans involved demolishing the 1991 conservatory. Ultimately, the board hired the Italian architect Renzo Piano (who had not participated in the original competition), along with Beyer Blinder Belle. Although Piano had not previously designed a building in New York City, he had been selected because of his experience designing buildings in various styles and geographical contexts. The plans called for new exhibit areas, a reading room, an auditorium, and more storage space. The Morgan planned to raise $25 million for maintenance and $100 million for the renovation itself. Despite the September 11 attacks, the Morgan decided to proceed with the expansion. The library presented preliminary plans to the LPC in January 2002. The LPC approved the proposal shortly afterward, despite concerns about the design from Manhattan Community Board 6 and the architect Robert A. M. Stern.

In May 2003, the Morgan Library's buildings were closed for construction and expansion, and the collection was placed into storage or moved to other institutions. At the time, the museum recorded about 200,000 annual visitors but wanted to accommodate twice that number. The library sponsored numerous traveling exhibitions around the country. All of the post-1928 annexes were demolished. Workers built most of the new spaces underground, excavating nearly 50,000 short tons (45,000 long tons; 45,000 t) of bedrock. The entrance was also relocated to Madison Avenue. In conjunction with the renovation, Pierce planned to rebrand the institution as a museum. The Morgan also continued to acquire objects during the renovation, such as the collection of the lyricist Fred Ebb. The project cost $106 million in total; (Note: One source gives a conflicting figure of $109 million.) the renovation did not include the main building.

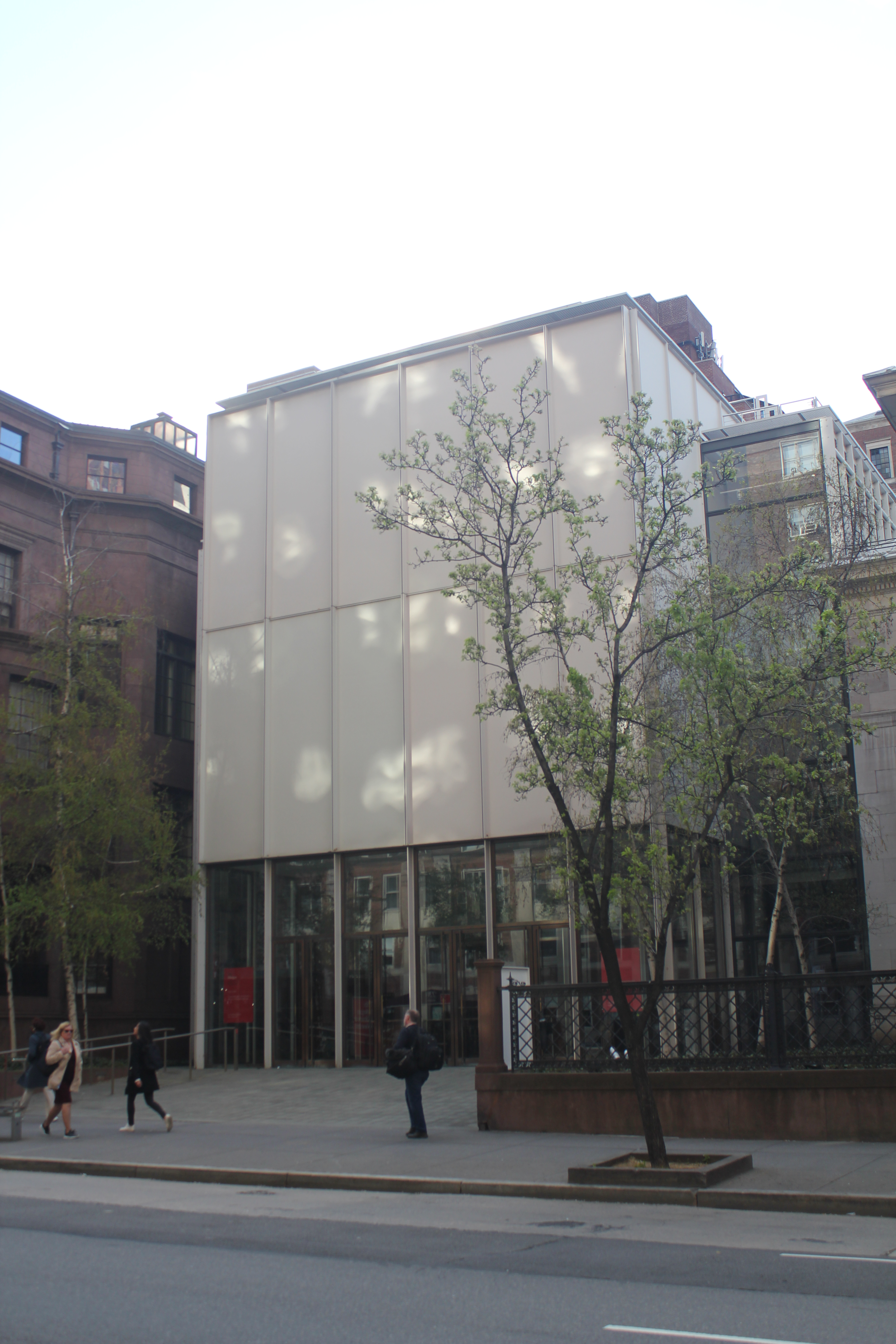
The Madison Avenue entrance building, which was completed in 2006

The library reopened on April 29, 2006, and was renamed the Morgan Library & Museum. J. P. Morgan's private office and vault were also opened to the public. Following the renovation, the number of annual visitors increased to 223,000, but this number had declined to 150,000 by 2010. The museum also hosted concerts in its new auditorium, and it hired Restaurant Associates to operate a cafe there. Pierce retired as the museum's director in early 2007, saying that some museum members had opposed changes made during his tenure. William M. Griswold was hired as the museum's next director that April, overseeing the growth of its collections, exhibition programs, and curatorial departments. By the late 2000s, there was still not enough space for the museum's permanent collection. The museum began planning to restore the main building c. 2008.

==== 2010s to present ====
In May 2010, Griswold announced that the main building would be renovated, and the museum started providing audio guides about its collections. The renovation cost $4.5 million and included cleaning the marble facade, replacing electrical systems and lighting, and opening the North Room to the public. Beyer Blinder Belle designed the restoration, which was completed in October 2010. Alongside the main building's renovation, Griswold wanted to digitize the collection. The Morgan established a photography department in 2012. Griswold resigned as the Morgan's director in 2014, and Colin Bailey was appointed as the director of the Morgan Library & Museum the next year.

The Morgan Library & Museum announced in February 2019 that it would renovate the main building's facade. Integrated Conservation Resources restored the main building, completing the facade's restoration later that year. The landscape designer Todd Longstaffe-Gowan designed a garden surrounding the original building, since the neighborhood, at the time, lacked parkland. The LPC had initially opposed the garden, as the original building had never had a garden, but approved the project after learning that J. P. Morgan had wanted a garden around the library. The museum was temporarily closed from March to September 2020 during the COVID-19 pandemic, and the renovation was delayed as a result. The garden opened to the public in June 2022; the renovation had cost $13 million.

The Morgan Library & Museum celebrated its 100th anniversary as a public institution in 2024. To celebrate its centennial, the museum began raising $50 million in 2023, including $35 million for its endowment and $15 million for capital improvements. The heiress Katharine Rayner donated $10 million to endow the director's position, which was renamed in her honor in early 2024, and the Jerome L. Greene Foundation donated another $5 million.

== Collection ==
John Pierpont Morgan's original collection included porcelains, triptychs, books, and manuscripts. The collection of the Morgan Library & Museum contained more than 350,000 objects by the early 21st century. One late-20th-century reporter described the collection as including a variety of "almost random treasures". The library's online catalog, Corsair, contains records for many of the collection's objects.

=== Manuscripts and letters ===
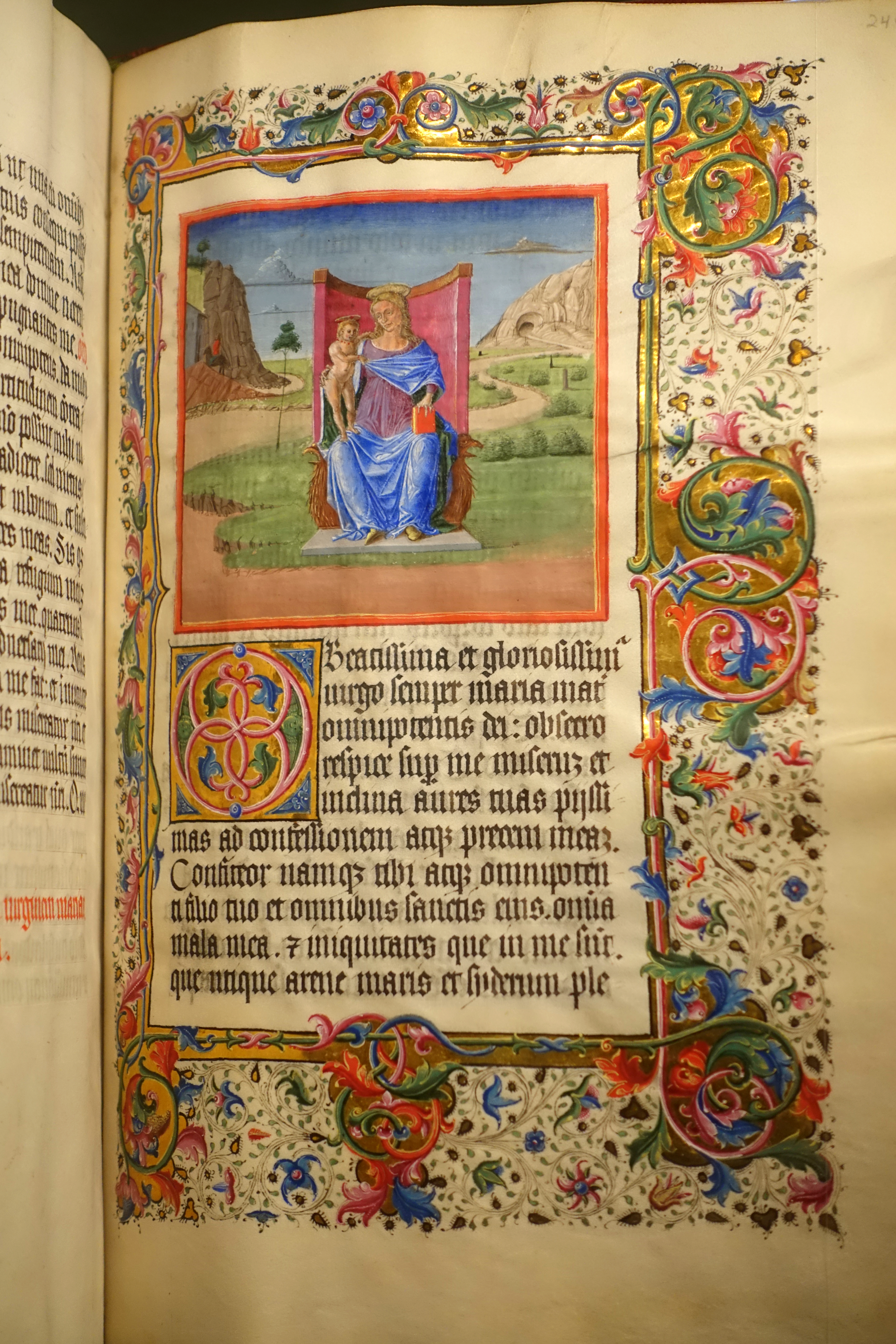
One of the illuminated manuscripts

The Morgan Library & Museum has long contained a collection of illuminated manuscripts, which date from the sixth to sixteenth centuries. As early as 1923, the Morgan Library counted 560 illuminated manuscripts in its collection, a number that had grown to over 1,100 by the 21st century. Among the manuscripts are the Morgan Bible, Morgan Beatus, Hours of Catherine of Cleves, Farnese Hours, Morgan Black Hours, and Codex Glazier, as well as an Anglo-Saxon Gospels manuscript.

The manuscript collection also contains authors' original manuscripts, many of them autographed. The library's early acquisitions included a Charles Dickens manuscript of A Christmas Carol; a J. M. Barrie manuscript; and original drawings for The Pickwick Papers and the Book of Job. The collection also includes manuscripts of poems by Robert Burns; nine of Walter Scott's novels; Alexander Pope's poem An Essay on Man; John Keats's poem Endymion; Francis Bacon's book Novum Organum, Edgar Allan Poe's short story "A Tale of the Ragged Mountains"; and Ernest Hemingway's short story "Three Stories and Ten Poems". There are also writings from Émile Zola, Victor Hugo, Marie Antoinette, George Sand, Alexandre Dumas, Thomas Moore, Jane Austen, John Milton, John Ruskin, and Honoré de Balzac. Other documents in the Morgan's collection are a collection of 64 Central European manuscripts and one of about two dozen original prints of the United States Declaration of Independence.

There are many letters in the collection, some dating as far back as ancient Babylonian times. The Morgan holds original letters by Napoleon, Horace Walpole, Voltaire, Francesco Filelfo, John Cheever, Thomas Pynchon, Vincent van Gogh, and George Beaumont. There is also a rare 1516 letter from Andrea Corsali with the first description of the Southern Cross.

The collection includes notebooks and journals as well. These include the notebooks of Percy Bysshe Shelley, Nathaniel Hawthorne, Tennessee Williams, and Henry David Thoreau. Diaries are also displayed, including those of Queen Victoria, pirate Bartholomew Sharp, writer E. B. White, and J. P. Morgan Sr. himself.

=== Musical collection ===
The Morgan Library & Museum also houses a sizable musical manuscript collection. A 1998 magazine article about the collection described it as containing 1,250 music manuscripts; 1,900 pieces of music-related literature; and 7,000 letters written by musicians. The music collection includes autographed and annotated libretti and scores from Ludwig van Beethoven, Johannes Brahms, Luigi Cherubini, Frédéric Chopin, Charles Gounod, George Frideric Handel, Joseph Haydn, Gustav Mahler, Gioachino Rossini, and Giuseppe Verdi. It also contains letters by Wolfgang Amadeus Mozart, Felix Mendelssohn, and Richard Wagner, among other musicians.

The only significant music manuscript that Morgan bought in his lifetime was Beethoven's Violin Sonata in G major, Opus 96, which he acquired in 1907. Notable specific pieces include two sets of Schubert's Impromptus manuscripts; Andrea Antico's Motetti e Canzone, and Mozart's Haffner Symphony. The collection also contains the scraps of paper on which Bob Dylan jotted down "Blowin' in the Wind" and "It Ain't Me Babe". There are several pieces of Victorian-era musical artifacts, such as Gilbert and Sullivan manuscripts and related artifacts. In 2024, museum staff discovered an unpublished waltz by Chopin, dating from the 1830s, in the collection.

=== Books ===
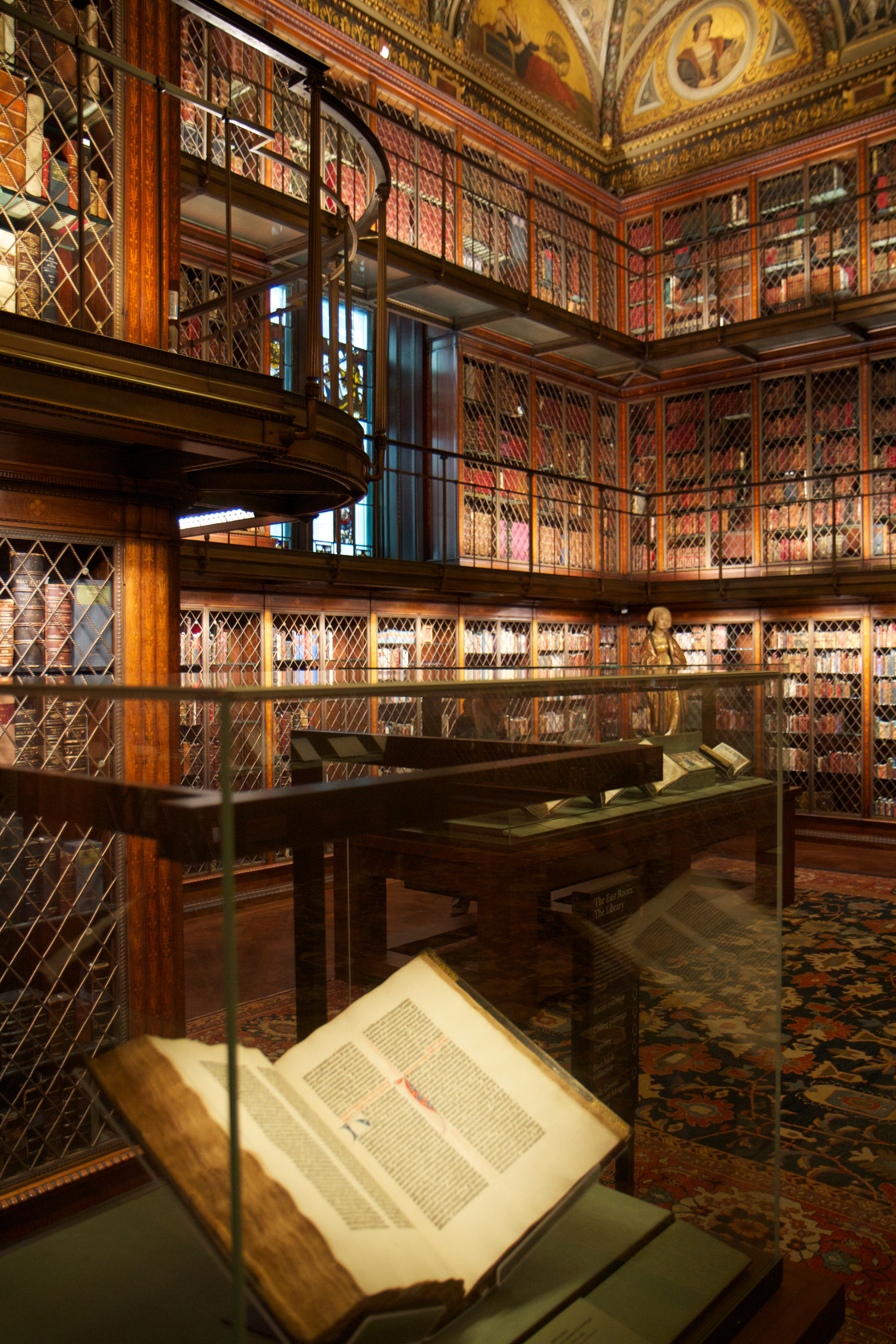
A Gutenberg Bible on display at the Morgan Library

The collection includes early printed Bibles and other religious works, among them three Gutenberg Bibles, one of six original copies of the first Italian Bible, one of three known copies of the Constance Missal, a rare copy of the Mainz Psalter, and the Golden Gospels of Henry III. The Morgan also contains material from ancient Egypt and medieval liturgical objects (including Coptic literature examples); William Blake's original drawings for his edition of the Book of Job; and concept drawings for Saint-Exupéry's The Little Prince. The Morgan has a collection of ancient Near Eastern cylinder seals: small stone cylinders finely engraved with images for transfer to clay by rolling.

The Morgan contains various examples of Latin and Greek literary classics, along with more modern American and European printed books. The collection includes numerous examples of fine bookbinding. These include various bindings of Coptic manuscripts from the 9th and 10th centuries, the metalwork covers of the Lindau Gospels, copies of books by early British printer William Caxton, and a binding made for Christina, Queen of Sweden.

There are also children's books. For example, the collection includes a book with the first known printing of the rhyme "This Is the House That Jack Built". In addition, the collection contains the first editions or proofread versions of Struwwelpeter, Alice's Adventures in Wonderland, and Max and Moritz.

=== Visual art ===
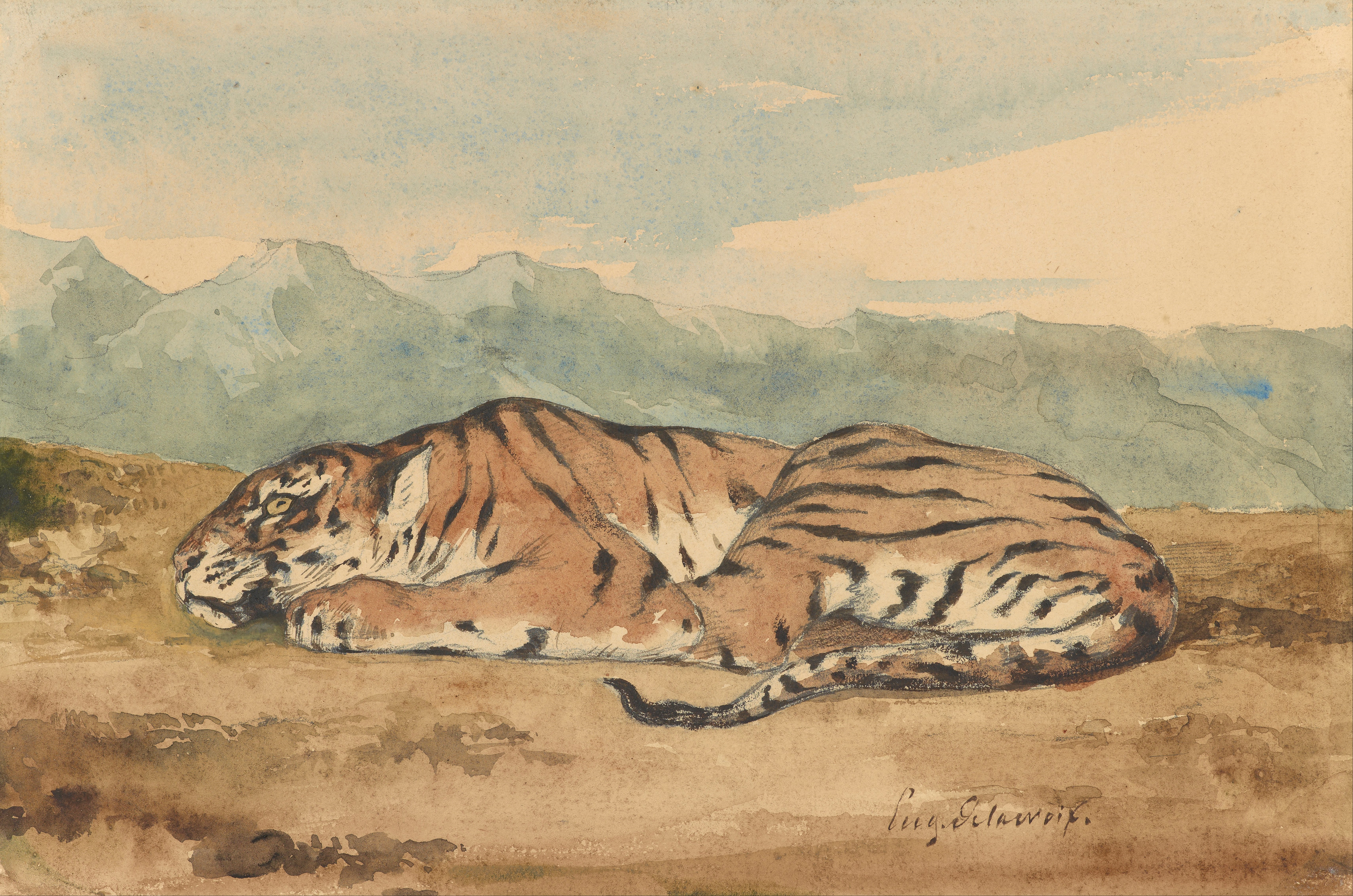
Royal Tiger by Eugène Delacroix, one of the paintings in the collection

The Morgan contains a large collection of incunabula, prints, and drawings. The collection includes some Old Master paintings collected by Morgan, as well as objects like wedding portraits. The Old Master paintings include works by Hans Memling, Perugino, and Cima da Conegliano. Some Old Master works have been sold off over the years, such as Domenico Ghirlandaio's masterpiece Portrait of Giovanna Tornabuoni. The collection also includes numerous drawings from 13th-to-19th-century French masters such as Antoine Watteau, François Boucher, Jacques-Louis David, and Jean Auguste Dominique Ingres. The Morgan also holds a set of miniature Rajput paintings. Other notable artists of the Morgan Library & Museum include Jean de Brunhoff, Paul Cézanne, Gaston Phoebus, and Rembrandt van Rijn.

The Morgan's collection includes around 12,000 drawings and watercolors dating as far back as the 14th century, including 1,000 sheets from British artists and 3,000 sheets from Italian artists. Notable specific objects include twelve William Blake watercolors, the drawing Bathers by Renoir, eight Rembrandt etchings, and 54 drawings by Eugène Delacroix. The Morgan also has a photography department. The collection includes work from such photographers as Dennis Oppenheim and Henri Cartier-Bresson, and the photographs themselves are collected from various genres and time periods.

=== Other objects ===
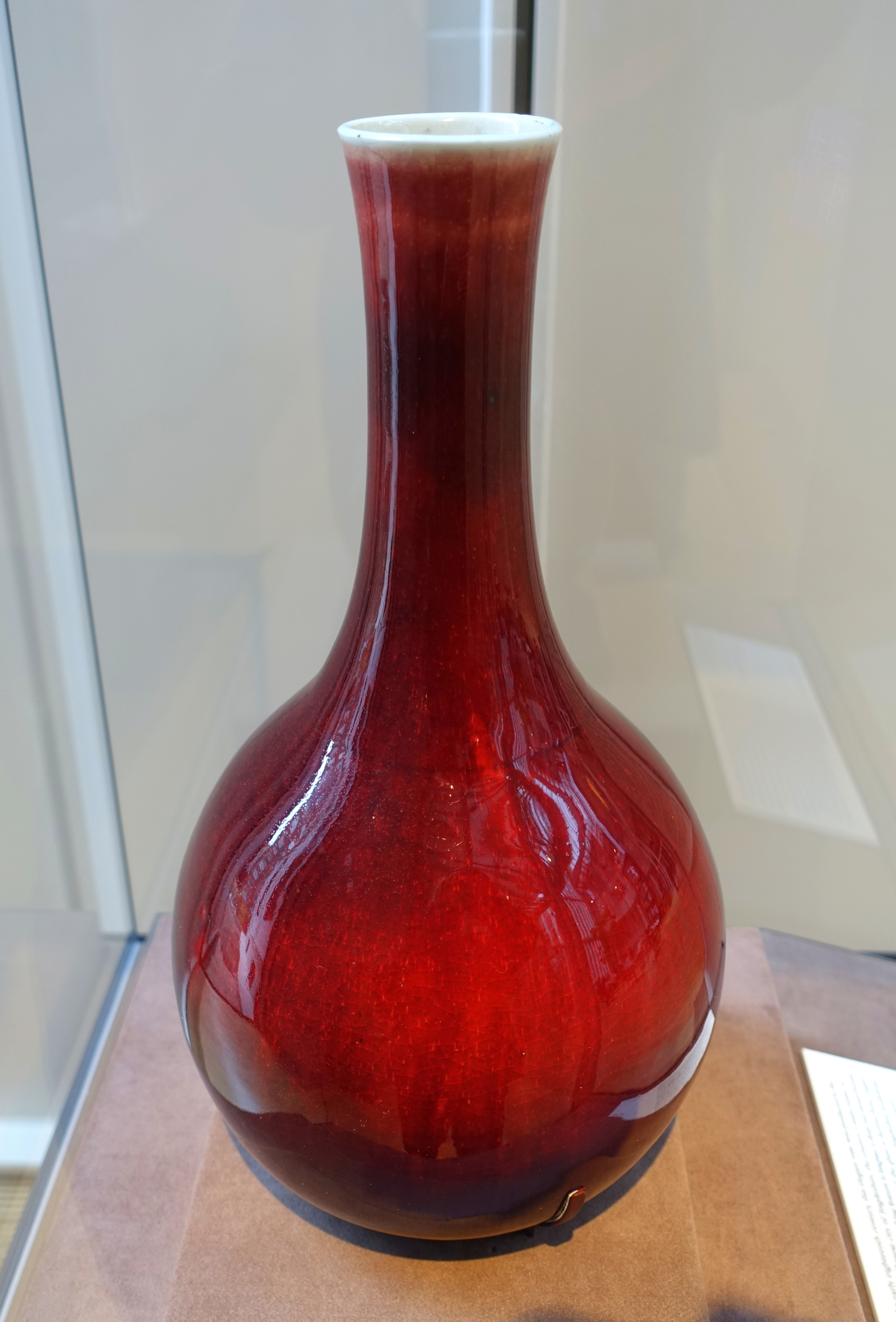
A vase in the Morgan Library & Museum's collection

Before J. P. Morgan died, he had acquired a variety of decorations such as a Persian carpet, Genoese and Chinese vases, and an Egyptian carved-stone group. The Washington Post reported in 1914 that the collections included "tapestries, bronzes and silver, Greek antiques, jeweled miniatures, porcelains, ancient jewelry, and wonderful books and manuscripts". Among these were royal jewels, 70 pieces of old German silver, 64 miniatures, a set of 15th-century marble and bronze objects, Chinese porcelain, and watches. Morgan also kept various "knickknacks" such as a four-thousand-year-old Babylonian figure found near Pompeii. The institution once had a reliquary that supposedly included Mary Magdalene's tooth, as well as Renaissance-era bronze medals, which have been sold off.

The modern-day museum has a silver-gilt figure of Le Roi de Bourges, and the 12th-century Stavelot Triptych. Other notable objects include stage and costume designs from the collection of Donald Oenslager and a map of the Palestine region from around 1300. The museum's Gilder Lehrman Collection also contains various maps.

=== Restitution claims ===
Over the years, there have been several restitution claims regarding alleged stolen artwork in the Morgan's collection. The Morgan returned two items to Germany in 2001 after the Morgan's officials confirmed that they had been stolen. In 2019, an Italian prosecutor claimed that the museum hosted a sacramentary that was stolen in 1925 from the municipality of Apiro. In 2023, the Morgan and several other institutions surrendered seven pieces painted by Egon Schiele after the New York County District Attorney determined that the works had been looted from the collection of Fritz Grünbaum, who was murdered in the Holocaust.

== Programming and events ==
Various events and programs are hosted at the Morgan, such as concerts, films, and lectures. The museum has hosted concerts and tours since the 1950s, and it began hosting regular concerts and recitals in Gilder Lehrman Hall in 2006. In addition, guided tours of the permanent collection are hosted each afternoon except Monday. The Morgan also operates several classes for school groups, including the "Exploring with the Morgan" course for humanities and the arts. Parties are hosted at the Morgan annually, such as the Young Fellows Summer Cocktail Party and Mr. Morgan's Winter Gala.

The Morgan hosts exhibits on a variety of topics throughout the year. In the mid-20th century, the Morgan's annual exhibits included showcases of recent acquisitions (Note: See, for example:) and rare books. Temporary exhibitions were staged in the annex buildings, while the main building was reserved for Morgan's main collection. Until the Morgan Library's expansion was completed in 1991, the institution had so little space that parts of the permanent collection had to be hidden from view whenever there was a temporary exhibition. Although the 1991 expansion allowed for more temporary exhibitions, the museum could host only one exhibition at once, and it often could not display its permanent collection. After the 2006 expansion, it could host multiple exhibitions at once.

== Buildings ==
=== Main building ===
The main building (also known as the McKim Building) was constructed between 1902 and 1906 as the original structure in the complex. It was designed in the Classical Revival style by Charles Follen McKim of McKim, Mead & White. The original building occupies a lot of 117 by 50 feet (36 by 15 m) and was intended to be built in a similar scale to contemporary New York Public Library branches. The center of the original structure contains an extension measuring 73.5 feet (22.4 m) long, giving the structure a "T" shape; this small wing was intended to connect to a similar structure along 37th Street. The original library building is placed behind a solid-bronze fence with hand-twisted bars.

==== Facade ====
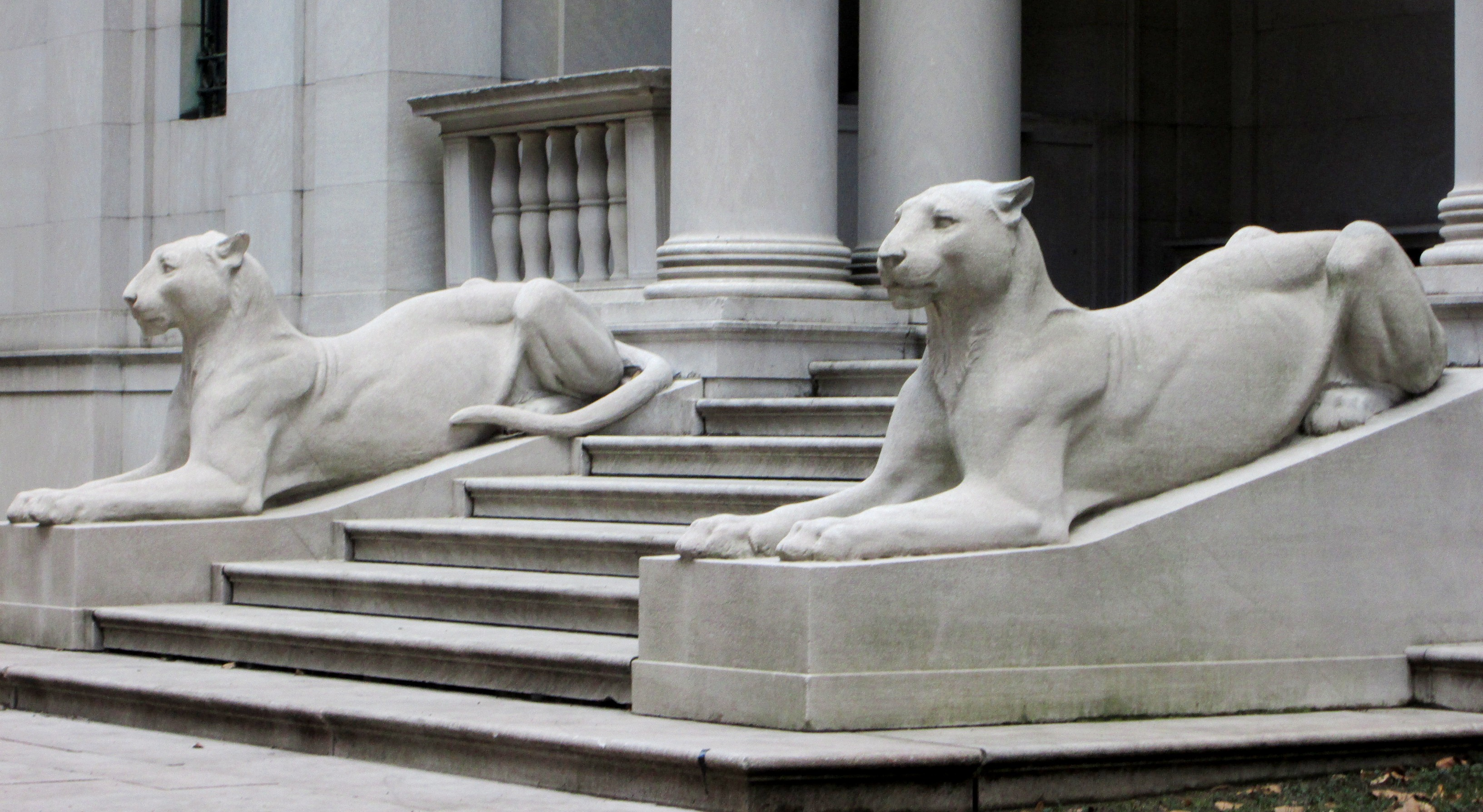
Edward Clark Potter's lionesses flank the main entrance.

The building has a facade of Tennessee marble, behind which is an air gap and an interior brick wall. McKim took his inspiration from the Villa Giulia, particularly the attic of its Nymphaeum. Further inspiration came from the 16th-century Villa Medici in Rome. The exterior walls are made of dry masonry, which allowed the marble blocks to be set evenly, thus requiring a minimal amount of mortar. Tinfoil sheeting was placed between the blocks to prevent moisture buildup; the tinfoil sheeting measures 1/64 inch (0.40 mm) thick and is laid between the horizontal joints. Charles T. Wills was responsible for the dry masonry construction. The Wall Street Journal reported upon the library's completion, "No other building in Europe or America was ever erected with this care."

The main entrance is a Palladian arch at the center of the 36th Street facade. It is composed of an arched opening 14 feet (4.3 m) wide, flanked by two openings under flat lintels, each of which is 9 feet (2.7 m) wide. There are two recessed niches on that facade, one on each side of the entrance. Surrounding the library is a garden, which covers 5,000 square feet (460 m^{2}) and contains artifacts from J. P. Morgan's collection. The garden also contains pathways embedded with pebbles, which Sicilian craftsman Orazio Porto laid manually.

The central archway contains a portico with a groin vaulted ceiling, supported by two Ionic columns on each side. A flight of steps, leading to the main entrance, is flanked by two lionesses sculpted by Edward Clark Potter, who would later create the two lions that guard the New York Public Library Main Branch. Above the entranceway are allegorical roundels and panels, which was originally given to Andrew O'Connor and then reassigned to Adolph Weinman after O'Connor could not complete his contract. These panels depict tragic and lyric poetry. The portico has a geometric mosaic tile floor with marble. Inside the portico is a 16th-century pair of bronze doors, imported from Florence and made in the style of Lorenzo Ghiberti's doors at the Florence Baptistery. Each door contains five carved bronze panels, which depict allegorical scenes. By the 21st century, the doors were opened extremely infrequently. There are six Doric style pilasters flanking the main entrance.

==== Interior ====
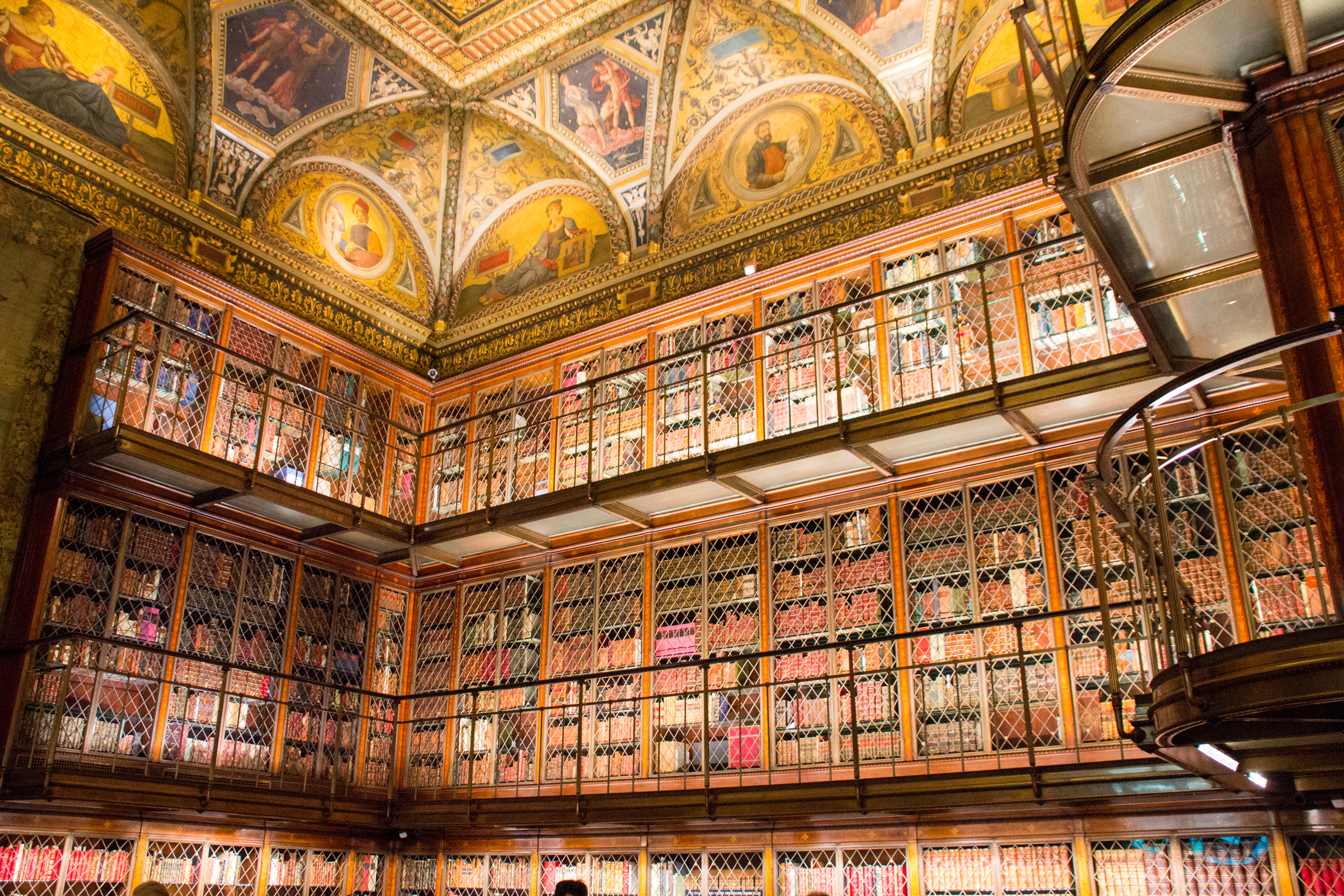
Library (east) room

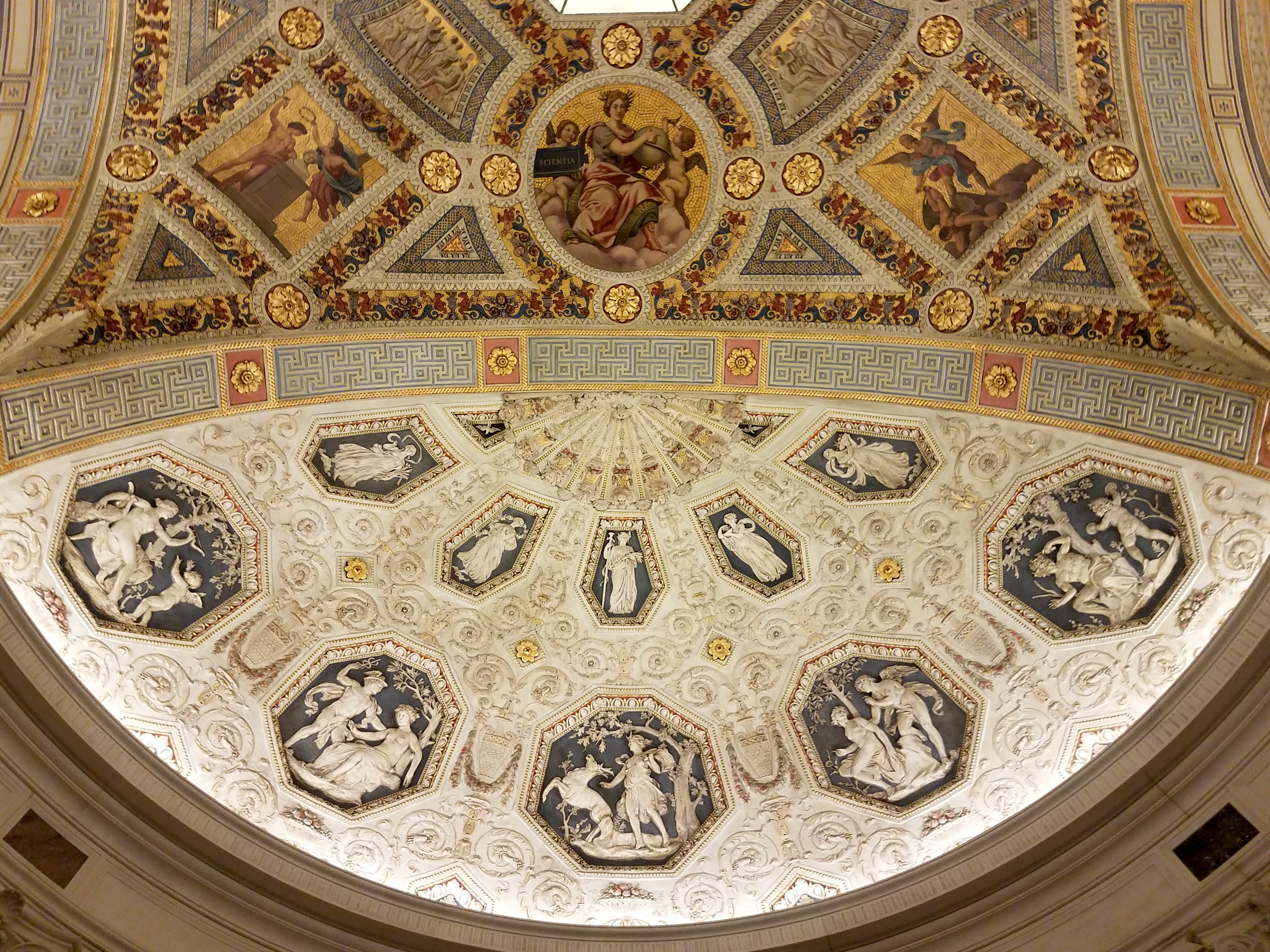
Rotunda (center) room

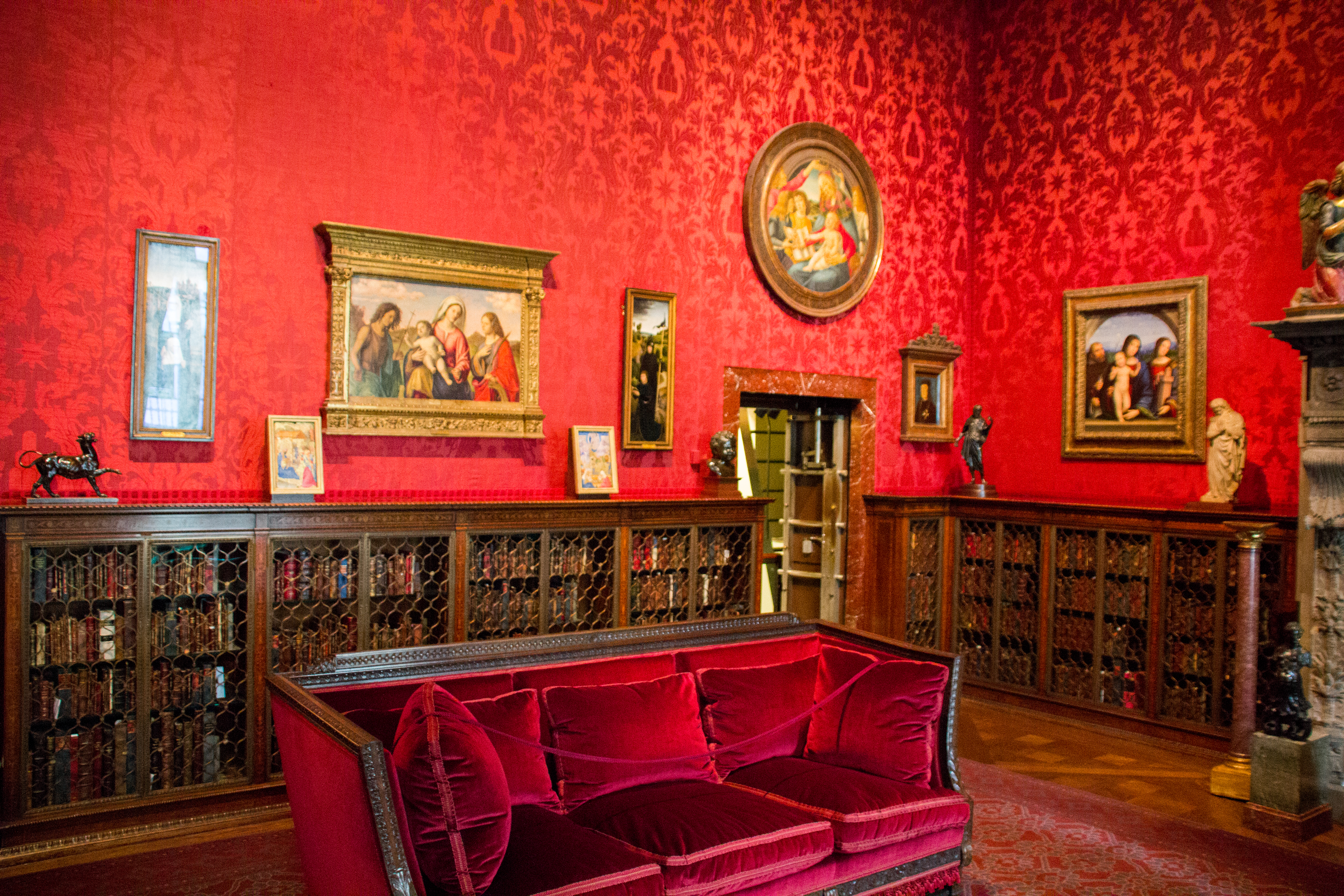
Study (west) room

The interior of the main library building is richly decorated, with a polychrome rotunda. It leads to three public rooms: Morgan's private study to the west, the librarian's office to the north, and the original library to the east. Each of the three rooms had dozens of bookcase doors. As a fireproofing measure, almost nothing in the library was made of wood, except for the bookcases' frames and some doors. The bookcases had glass shelves and were covered with steel grilles. Morgan also had a steel vault where he kept his most valuable manuscripts, such as about 600 Renaissance and medieval manuscripts. There were asbestos shutters that could seal off the building's windows if necessary. The main building contains 14,700 square feet (1,370 m^{2}) of space and has displayed over 300 objects since 2010.

The rotunda has a ceiling with murals and plasterwork inspired by Raphael, created by H. Siddons Mowbray. On the north side of the ceiling is a half-dome with ten relief panels in a blue-and-white color scheme. The lunette panels on the west, east, and south sides of the ceiling, measuring 23 feet (7.0 m) high, allude to material in Morgan's collection. There is also a dome with roundels and decorative rectangular panels, as well as an octagonal central skylight. The rotunda floor is clad with multicolored marble, patterned after the floor of the Villa Pia in Vatican City, and features a porphyry centerpiece. The walls contain mosaic baseboards and are separated into panels with vertical pilasters, topped by Composite style pilasters. When the library opened, the rotunda was furnished with two 15th-century chairs and a bronze bust by Benvenuto Cellini. Following a 2010 renovation, the rotunda has several display cases. The doorways to the rooms on the east and west are made of white marble, topped by marble entablatures and flanked by green marble columns.

Morgan's study is the West Room. The design of the study reflected Morgan's tastes; as his son-in-law Herbert Satterlee said, "No one could really know Mr. Morgan at all unless he had seen him in the West Room." The West Room contains low wooden bookshelves as well as a fireplace with a marble mantelpiece. The decorative elements include stained glass panels in the study's windows, as well as a wall covering of red damask. The current damask covering replicates a pattern that was displayed at Rome's Chigi Palace. The coffered ceiling was reportedly purchased in Italian cardinal's palace. The artist James Wall Finn painted coats-of-arms onto the ceiling based on Italian bookplates from Morgan's collection. Finn's work was designed in such an authentic manner that it was frequently mistaken as part of the ceiling's original design. By 2010, the room displayed some of the objects that Morgan collected.

To the north or rear of the rotunda is the original librarian's office. During the mid-20th century, the room was also used as a directors' office. Since 2010, the office has been open to the public as a gallery known as the North Room. The space hosts ancient Roman, Greek, and Near Eastern objects, as well as items such as Egyptian figures and ancient seals. Bookcases are placed on a mezzanine, while the main level includes display cases.

The East Room (also the library room) is the largest room in the main building and has triple-tiered bookcases. The bookcases were lined with asbestos and encased in glass; the original Plexiglas was replaced with acrylic in 2010. Some of the bookcases can be moved, providing access to a stairway to the upper tiers and to a secret compartment. On the east wall of the East Room is a fireplace with a tapestry showing the "Triumph of Avarice". The fireplace itself dates from the 15th century and was imported from Italy. Mowbray designed eighteen lunettes and spandrels atop each wall, modeled after the work of Pinturicchio. The figures in the lunettes alternate between allegorical female muses and notable artists, explorers, or teachers. Zodiac symbols are placed on the spandrels, as the signs of the zodiac were particularly important to J. P. Morgan. Two additional spandrels contain allegorical motifs that depict changing seasons.

=== Madison Avenue and 36th Street annex ===
The corner of Madison Avenue and 36th Street contains a two-story Italianate style structure designed by Benjamin Wistar Morris, with space for offices, exhibitions, and a research library. The annex, made of the same Tennessee marble as the original, was completed in 1928. It measures 90.67 by 60.5 feet (28 by 18 m), with a later 26-by-30-foot (7.9 by 9.1 m) addition. The Morris annex is accessed by a 22-foot-wide (6.7 m) stair facing 36th Street. Compared with the main building, the Morris annex is simpler in design.

The Morris annex included a bookstore until 1991, when it became a gallery space. After 2006, the gallery space was split up, and the partitions there were removed. At the center of the Morris annex is the Marble Hall, flanked by the Morgan Stanley Galleries West and East.

=== 231 Madison Avenue ===
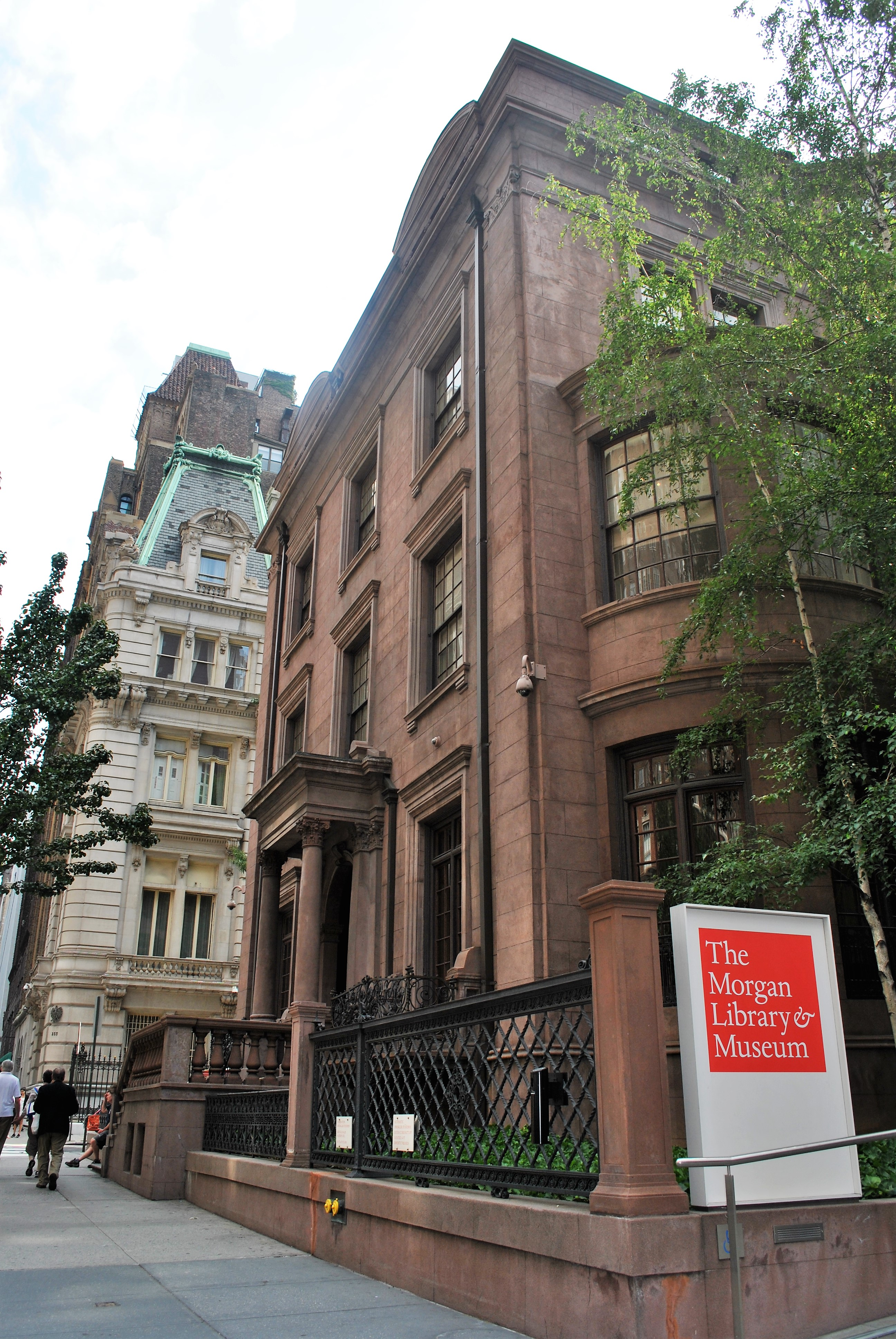
231 Madison Avenue

Also part of the library grounds is 231 Madison Avenue, an Italianate brownstone house on the southeast corner of Madison Avenue and East 37th Street, which was the home of Isaac Newton Phelps and later J. P. "Jack" Morgan Jr. The house contains the Morgan Shop on its northern side, facing 37th Street, and the Morgan Dining Room on its southern side. The house is set behind a barricade composed of a wrought-iron fence atop a brownstone ledge. The house was originally three stories tall and faced with pink stone, but after R. H. Robertson's renovation of 1888, became four stories tall with a raised basement. An office annex to the east, built in 1957, was originally faced with brick. Before the Morgan acquired it in 1988, it was a headquarters of the Lutheran Church.

==== Facade ====
The New York Herald Tribune wrote in 1943 that the facade had "a slight suggestion of French Renaissance influence". The Madison Avenue facade is divided vertically into three bays. An entrance stoop with a balustrade leads up to a central portico with two Corinthian columns flanked by rectangular sash windows. The second and third stories each have three rectangular windows, and a cornice runs above the third story. The attic contains small Ionic colonettes and pediments.

Along 37th Street, the water table containing the raised basement is topped by a molding. The original 1853 house to the west and the 1888 extension to the east are divided by a pier. The original section of the house is three bays wide, with a balcony and pediment on the first floor, and oval windows and an oriel window on the second. Within the 1888 extension, the first floor contains a projecting three-sided bay and a windowless arch, and the other two stories contain various windows. The cornice above the third floor, as well as the attic, in both the original house and its extension are similar to on Madison Avenue.

The southern facade of the house faces the rest of the library and is mostly obscured behind the 2006 addition. The westernmost portion of that facade, near Madison Avenue, contains rounded first- and second-story windows. There are also three-sided angled windows at the center of that facade.

==== Interior ====
Inside the house were 45 rooms. These spaces included a ballroom and 12 restrooms; in addition, the house had 22 fireplaces. After the museum's 1991 expansion, the house contained offices, conference rooms, meeting areas, and a gift shop. In addition, the ground-floor spaces were converted to lecture spaces. Following a 2006 renovation, one of the house's first-floor rooms was converted to a dining room, while the shop was relocated to another space. Inside the residence's attic is the 5,600-square-foot (520 m^{2}) Thaw Conservation Center, which is composed of spaces such as a library, reception area, and conservation rooms.

=== Entrance building and other annexes ===
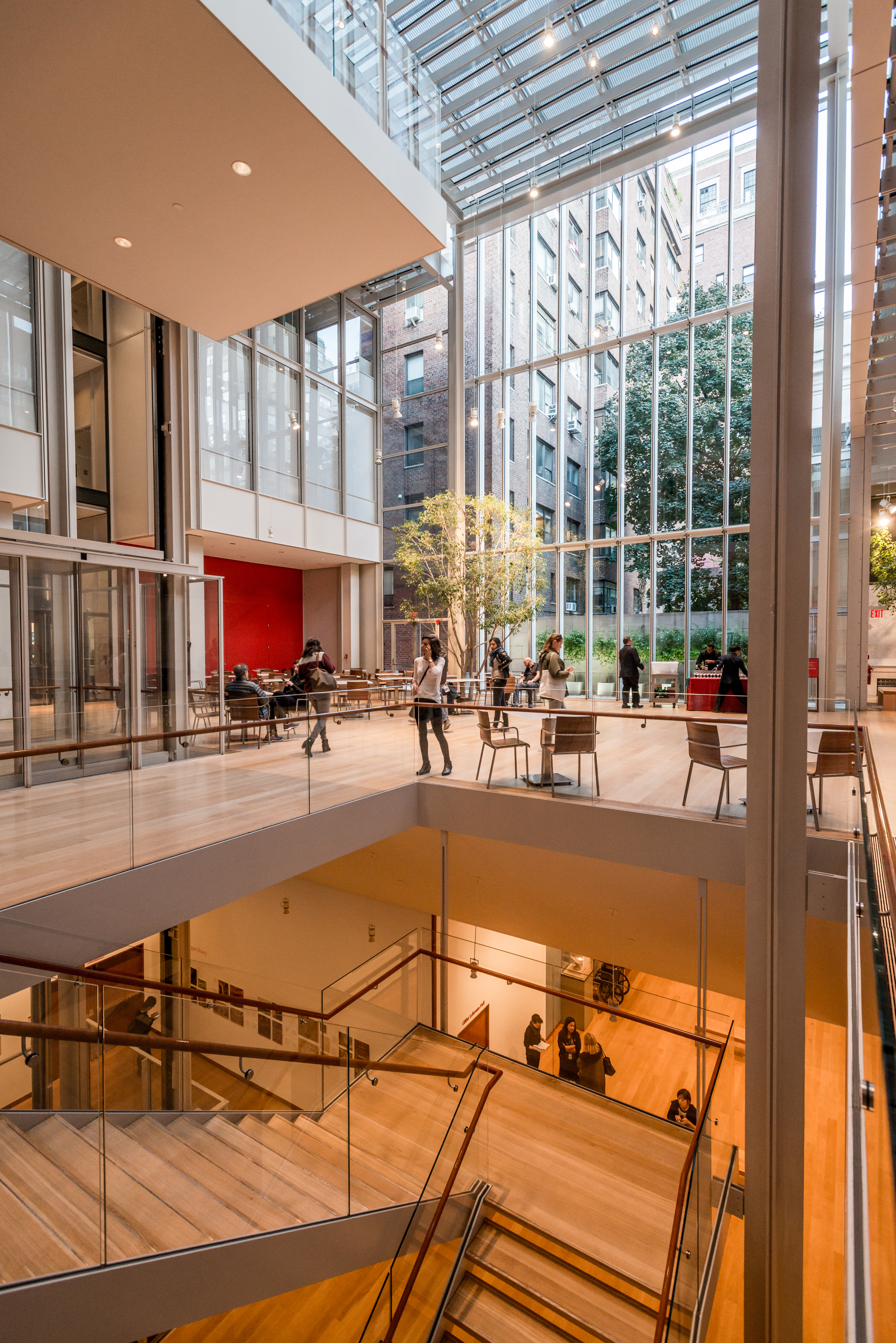
The interior of the Renzo Piano addition

In 2006, three structures were completed to designs by Renzo Piano, who worked alongside preservation architect Beyer Blinder Belle. There are four galleries in this section of the museum: the Clare Eddy Thaw Gallery, the Morgan Stanley Galleries West and East, and the Engelhard Gallery. The facades of the new above-ground buildings contain pinkish steel-and-glass curtain walls and are set back slightly from the museum's other structures. The buildings expanded the Morgan Library's area by 75,000 square feet (7,000 m^{2}), much of which is below ground.

==== Entrance building ====
The primary structure in that grouping is a four-story, steel-and-glass entrance building on Madison Avenue. The structure links McKim's library building, the annex, and the Phelps Stokes/Morgan house. The steel structural members are covered in rose-tinted paint as an allusion to the designs of main library and Phelps Stokes/Morgan house. Although externally inconspicuous, the building links the interior spaces of the complex. Inside the structure, a glass elevator links the different levels.

The entrance building contains the JPMorgan Chase Lobby, a space clad in cherry wood. Stairs lead up to the Morgan Shop and Morgan Dining Room, and there is an admission counter and coat room. The south wall has a corridor to the Morris annex and stairs to the second-floor Engelhard Gallery, the latter of which is a temporary-exhibition space. The Sherman Fairchild Reading Room, the museum's research library, is located on the top floor of the Madison Avenue pavilion and has balconies and a skylight. At the northeast corner of the entrance building is Gilder Lehrman Hall, an auditorium about 65 feet (20 m) below street level. Lehrman Hall has 280 seats. (Note: Other sources give conflicting figures of 260 or 299 seats.) New storage rooms were also created by drilling into Manhattan's bedrock schist. The underground rooms exten 55 feet (17 m) deep and contain much of the Morgan Library's collection.

==== Adjacent structures ====
Gilbert Court, a covered courtyard at the center of the complex, surrounds the entrance building on the north, east, and south. The courtyard is topped by a 50-foot-tall (15 m) glass roof. On the south wall of the court is the Clare Eddy Thaw Gallery, a 20-by-20-by-20-foot (6.1 m × 6.1 m × 6.1 m) space inspired by Renaissance chambers that Piano observed in Italy. At the court's southeast corner, stairs lead up to the original Morgan Library building, connecting to a vestibule between Morgan's study (the West Library) and the rotunda. There is also a structure next to 231 Madison Avenue, with ancillary areas and offices, in addition to a loading dock.

=== Former structures ===
The 2006 annexes replaced all of the additions built after 1928. These included a glass conservatory called the Garden Court, which was designed by Bartholomew Voorsanger of Voorsanger & Associates and completed in 1991. The Garden Court had a curved roof measuring 42 feet (13 m) tall. Under the roof was a vaulted space with plants selected by landscape architect Dan Kiley. The roof was supported by a 55-foot-long (17 m) truss and was covered by clear laminated glass to allow the plants to grow. The space also had metal-and-translucent-glass wall panels and a limestone wall on Madison Avenue. There was a vestibule connecting with the Morris annex to the south.

The post-1928 annexes also included a cloister structure between the main building and the Morris annex, built in 1960. A five-story, 26-by-30-foot (7.9 by 9.1 m) expansion was built in 1975 and designed by Platt, Wyckoff & Coles, with storage vaults and offices.

== Operation ==
=== Management ===
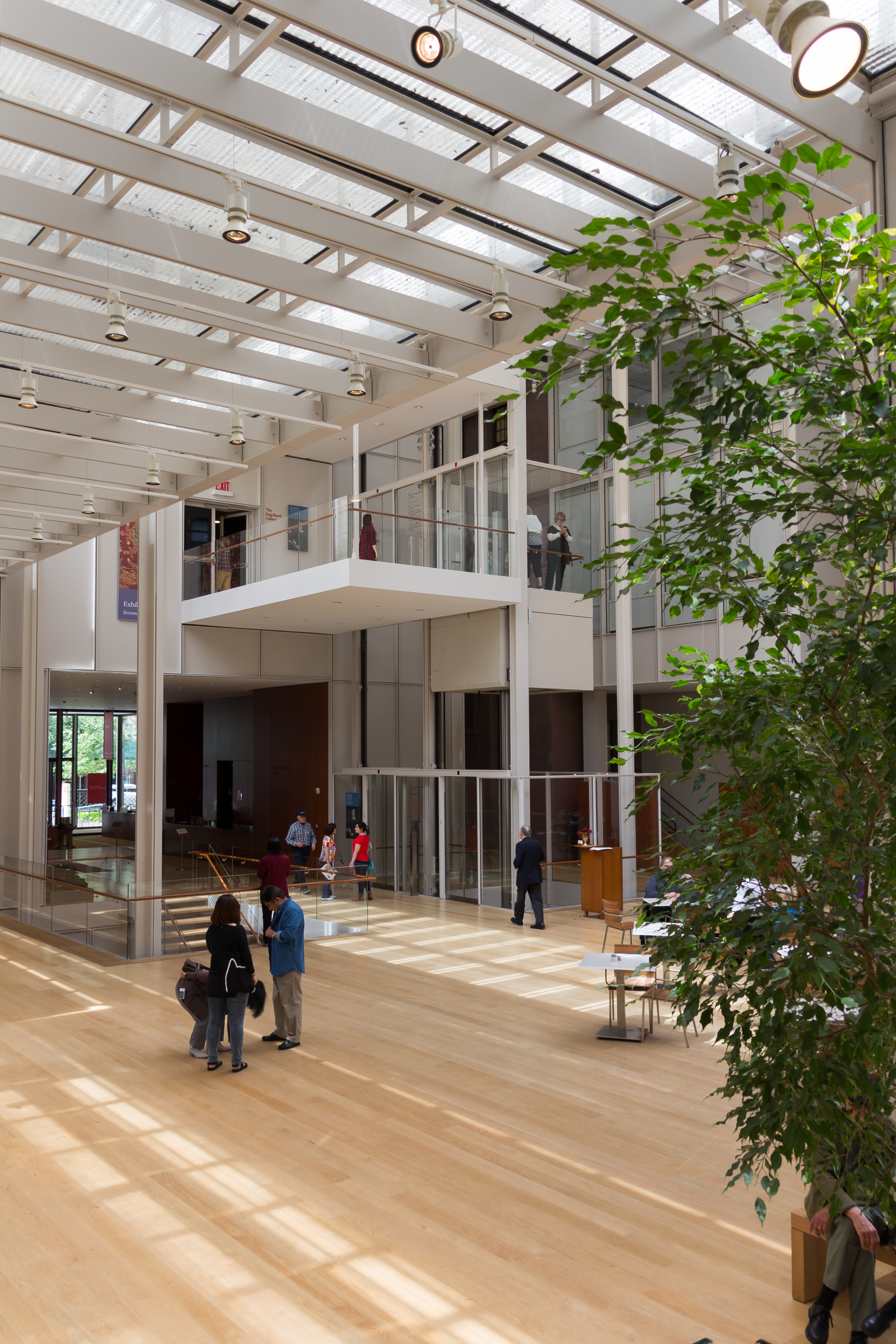
Interior of Piano's 2006 annex, which includes the lobby between Morris's 1928 annex and 231 Madison Avenue

The Morgan Library & Museum is operated by a nonprofit organization of the same name, which is dedicated to conserving the artworks in the museum's collection. Colin Bailey has been the director of the Morgan Library & Museum since 2015. Following a 2024 donation from Katharine Rayner, the director's position was renamed the Katharine J. Rayner Director until 2049. The museum is administered by a board of trustees. As of 2026, Robert K. Steel and G. Scott Clemons are the co-presidents of the museum's board of trustees.

Until 1981, the president of the museum was a Morgan family member. Previous museum presidents have included Jack Morgan's sons Junius Spencer Morgan III and Henry Sturgis Morgan. Other notable people in the museum's history have included Felice Stampfle, who was appointed the first Curator of Drawings and Prints at the Morgan Library in 1945. Some of the museum's past staff have donated objects to the collection, such as longtime librarian Curt F. Bühler, who donated illuminated manuscripts upon his death in 1985.

=== Attendance and funding ===
As of 2024, the museum accommodates 250,000 in-person visitors annually, while its online programming serves seven million additional people each year. Starting in January 2024, college students have been able to visit for free on the first Sunday of each month. The museum also allows visitors to reserve tickets for free admission on Friday evenings. According to the Condé Nast Traveler, most visitors are tourists, though local residents also visit the museum whenever there was an event or new exhibition.

Jack Morgan established a $1.5 million endowment fund for the Pierpont Morgan Library when it was opened to researchers in 1924. The endowment had grown to $53.5 million by the mid-1990s and $105 million by the early 2000s. In 2023, the museum recorded revenue of $23.7 million, expenses of $31.4 million, total assets of $386 million, and liabilities of $19.5 million.

== Reception and commentary ==
=== Collection commentary ===
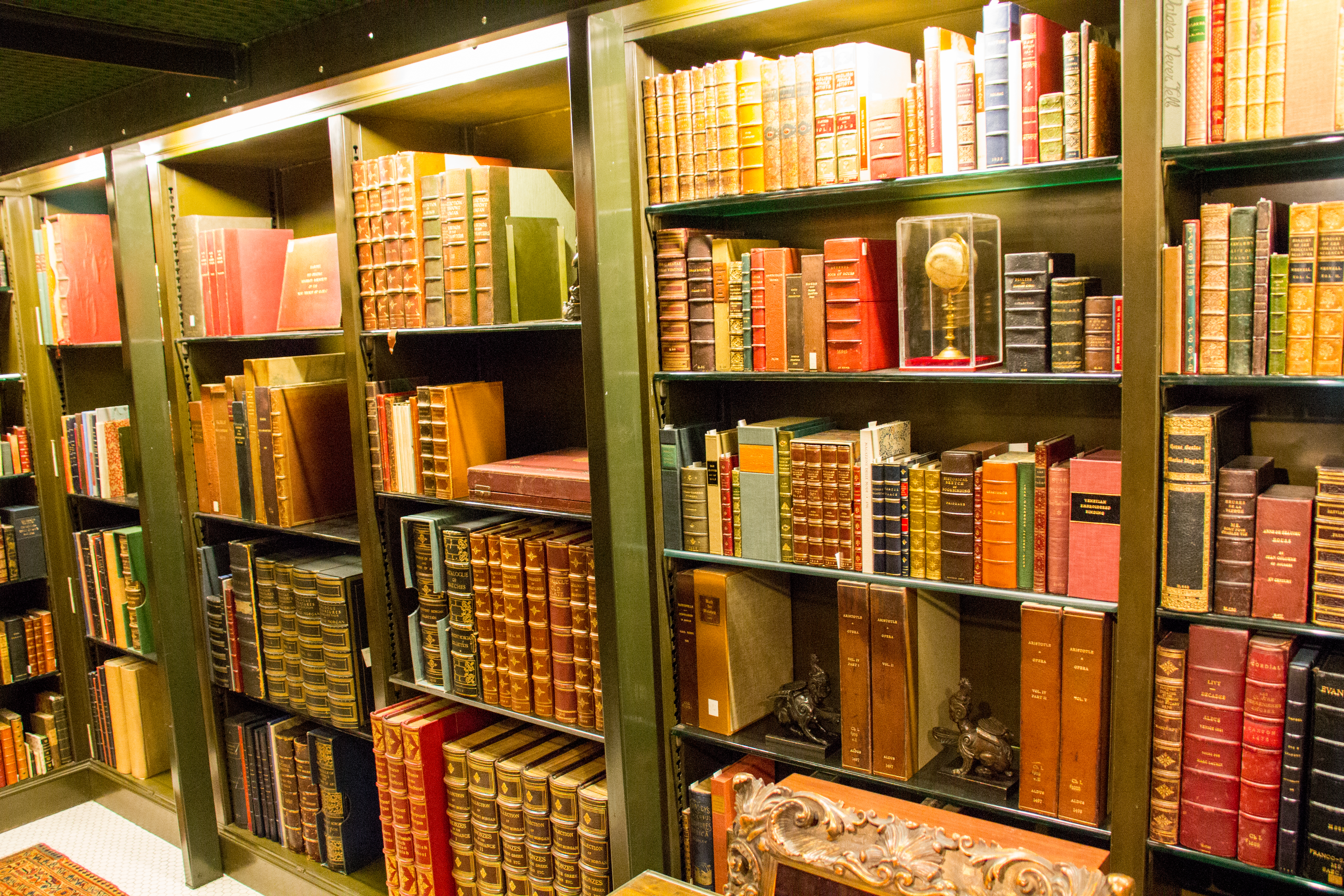
Bookshelves in the Morgan Library

A correspondent for the London Times, in 1908, characterized John Pierpont Morgan as "probably the greatest collector of things splendid and beautiful and rare who has ever lived". In 1927, after the library became a research institution, one writer for the New York Herald Tribune called it "a temple of white marble, most fair and proportionate yet with an air of secret exclusiveness". A writer for The Christian Science Monitor said in 1961 that the library housed "one of the most important private art collections in the world", and the Los Angeles Times wrote in 1966 that the Morgan Library was "a source of aesthetic refreshment and intellectual stimulation in any season". Another writer in 1969 described the Morgan as shunning publicity and that the collection of illuminated manuscripts, book bindings, and drawings was "unsurpassed in the Western Hemisphere".

A Newsweek article from 1970 described the library as having a "regal atmosphere", and a 1974 article from the same magazine called the library a symbol of the "patronage and connoisseurship" of the early 20th century. The Globe and Mail described the library in 1980 as a "treasure trove of early art". A writer for The New York Times Magazine said in 1994 that she felt the library was inviting, despite its formidable appearance.

In 1998, a reporter for The Journal News described the library as "a hushed and shady refuge from the city's sweltering asphalt". During the 2000s, a writer for the Chicago Tribune said that, although the Morgan was "a bibliophile's vision of paradise on Earth", it had a lower profile than other New York City museums because of its location. A 21st-century review from the Condé Nast Traveler said: "The Morgan is like a multi-hyphenate millennial—only instead of actress/model/influencer/whatever leads to early retirement, it's museum/library/landmark/historic site/music venue." A Fodor's review described the museum as having an "exceptional" collection of artifacts.

=== Architectural reception ===
==== Architectural commentary ====
Several publications praised the library after its completion. In 1906, the Real Estate Record and Guide wrote of McKim, Mead & White: "the new Morgan Library, in Thirty-sixth street, is among their most carefully studied designs." The library building was described in another publication as "one of the Seven Wonders of the Edwardian World", while Architectural Review called it "icy and exquisite". In a 1932 survey of 50 American architects, eleven ranked the Morgan Library as the United States' best building. A 1969 news article described the interiors' opulence as "almost indescribable", and Newsweek called Morgan's study as emblematic of "his taste, his power and his vanity". Morgan's private study was described by historian Wayne Andrews as "one of the greatest achievements of American interior decoration". Paul Goldberger wrote in 1981 that the main building's facade represented "rigorous, not fanciful, classicism" and the interiors were "very rich and very cold".

Ceiling of Pierpont Morgan's Study.

The annexes received mixed reviews. Architectural historian Robert A. M. Stern said the 1928 addition "did not frame McKim's jewel box so much as sidle up to it like an unattractive sibling", and Washington Post reporter Benjamin Forgey said it was "not nearly so exquisite" as the original structure. Conversely, Norval White and Elliot Willensky thought the 1928 annex "modestly defers to its master". Goldberger described the Garden Court in 1991 as having "a sleek, almost brittle quality", and Forgey described the conservatory as helping create "a definable low-rise historical place in high-rise New York".

When the Piano annex opened in 2006, Ada Louise Huxtable wrote that the museum was "cool in its understated excellence, its laid-back drama, the refinement of its details", as opposed to the old museum, which was "hot" because it was outwardly extravagant. Although Newsday and the Wall Street Journal both described the new entrance atrium as inviting, the Architectural Record criticized the atrium as not being distinctive. The Financial Times wrote that the 2006 annex's "luminous steel and glass spaces, was as radically different to the heavy stone and dense ornament of the library as was possible". Zachary Woolfe of The New York Times wrote of Lehrman Hall in 2025: "The space is precipitously raked and feels stifling, with flinty acoustics."

==== Landmark designations ====
231 Madison Avenue was designated by the New York City Landmarks Preservation Commission (LPC) in 1965, being one of the first structures protected under New York City's landmarks law. The Lutheran Church, then the owner of 231 Madison Avenue, had hoped to erect an office structure on the site of the Phelps Stokes/Morgan house and heavily opposed the house's designation. As a result, in 1974, the landmark status was removed from that house following a New York Court of Appeals ruling. After the Morgan acquired 231 Madison Avenue, that house was re-designated as a city landmark in 2002; the Morgan did not oppose the designation.

In 1952, the Municipal Art Society and the Society of Architects' New York chapter published a list of 20 buildings in the city that should "be preserved at all costs". The main library building on 36th Street was the only 20th-century building on that list. The LPC designated the exterior of the library's main building as a city landmark in 1966, and that structure was declared a National Historic Landmark the same year. In 1982, the main library building's interior was designated a city landmark. After the 1991 renovation made the main building wheelchair-accessible, the LPC gave the library an excellence award.

=== Media ===
The Morgan has also occasionally appeared in works of popular culture. E. L. Doctorow's 1975 novel Ragtime and its 1981 film adaptation depicted the library as a symbol of the wealthy. In addition, part of the Netflix TV series Dash & Lily was filmed in the museum.

== See also ==
- List of museums and cultural institutions in New York City
- List of National Historic Landmarks in New York City
- List of New York City Designated Landmarks in Manhattan from 14th to 59th Streets
- National Register of Historic Places listings in Manhattan from 14th to 59th Streets
