= Barry Streek =

South African journalist and activist

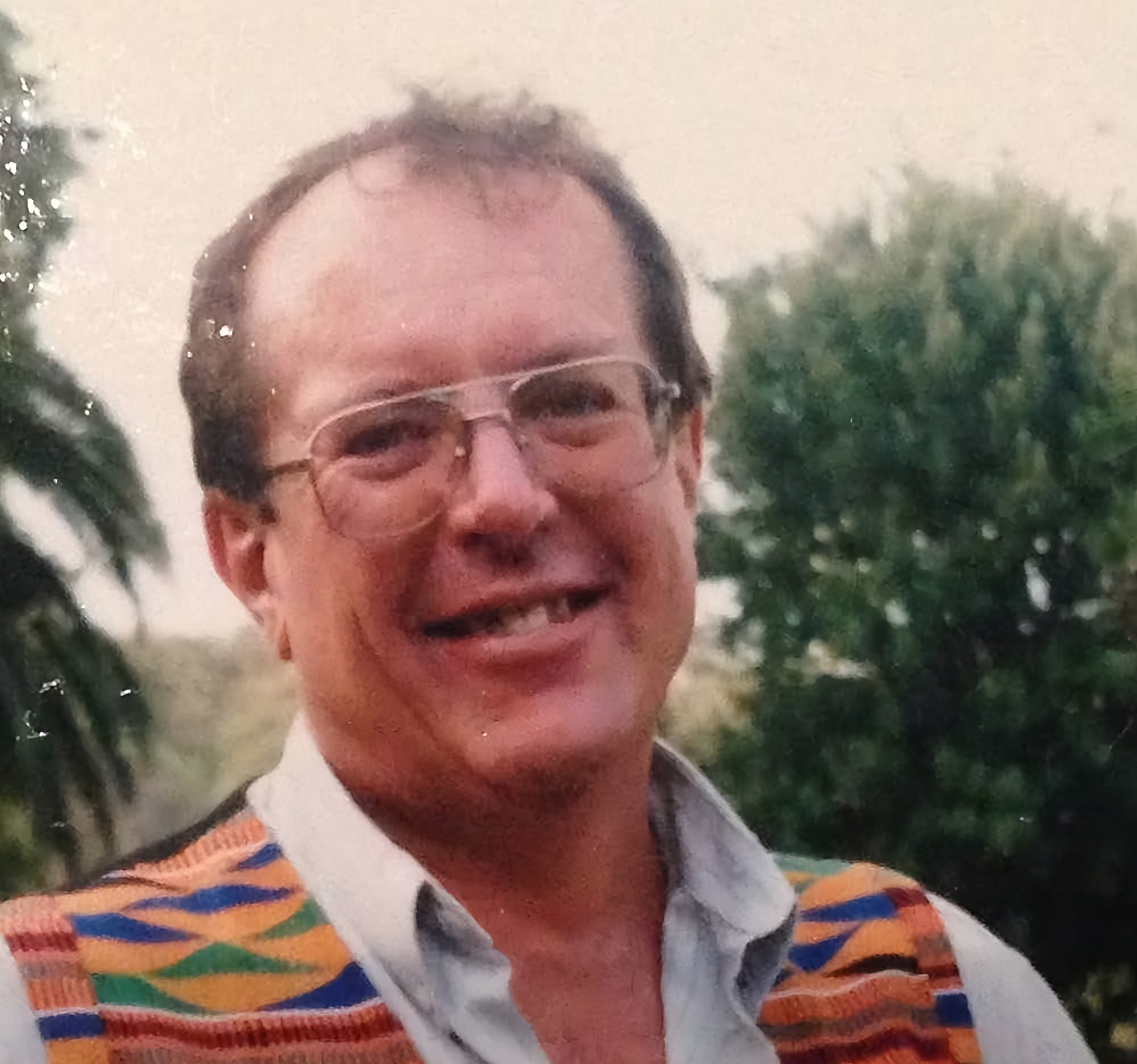
- Born: 30 August 1948; Pietermaritzburg, Kwazulu Natal, South Africa
- Died: 21 July 2006 (aged 57); Kenilworth, Cape Town, Western Cape, South Africa
- Occupations: journalist, author, parliamentary media manager
- Writing career
- Genre: non-fiction

Barry Streek (30 August 1948 – 21 July 2006) was a liberal South African political journalist and anti-apartheid activist.

== Early life and education ==
Barry Streek was educated at Michaelhouse in Kwazulu-Natal where he wrote for and was a member of the board of the Beacon, a student run journal. After which he completed his mandatory national service in the South African Navy in 1966. From 1967 to 1970 Streek studied politics and law at Rhodes University in Grahamstown, while contributing to the Daily Dispatch and other publications.

== Anti-apartheid activities ==
At Rhodes he joined the anti-apartheid National Union of South African Students and was involved in many anti-apartheid activities at the university for which the then South African government later put a banning order on him. It was revealed in later years that the police special branch, with direct assistance from the university, had compiled a substantial file on Streek's anti-apartheid activities. While at Rhodes Streek also worked for the local committee of Helen Suzman's Progressive Party.

After graduation in 1971 Streek assumed duty as secretary-general of the National Union of South African Students in Cape Town. In July he issued a circular to the executive members of NUSAS describing the development of the post-1953 imposition of university apartheid based on a letter written for the annual student assembly in July 1968. By 1971 black tertiary students in South Africa were isolated and, some might say, offered at best a mediocre parody of a university education, on ethnically segregated campuses which deprived them of regular contact with South Africans whose ethnicity, and even mother-tongue, was different from theirs. These were the so-called 'tribal colleges'. With Streek's prompting, NUSAS was seeking to raise the awareness of its predominantly 'white' membership of the conditions under which other South Africans lived and studied while at university, a necessary strategy since students belonging to different 'population groups' were effectively barred from one another's campuses.

As a journalist for a number of South African newspapers Streek was known for detailing and exposing the negative impact of the apartheid government.

In 1984 he founded the Social Change Assistance Trust (SCAT), a non-profit organisation that works to assist and help develop poor rural communities in South Africa. SCAT's mission was, and still is, to assist rural communities in improving their quality of life and living standards. SCAT's focus is on human rights, gender and racial equity, as well as local economic development in the poorest communities of South Africa, which also tend to be predominantly black communities, was not popular with the apartheid government of South Africa. Through SCAT he helped establish the civil society and trade union center at Community House where he was chairperson of the centre's board of directors.

In 1985 Streek met with the then banned African National Congress in Lusaka, Zambia.

In 1999 Streek co-founded the Ditikeni Investment Company to help fund non-profit civil society organisations that had declined due to a lack of donor funding in the post-apartheid era.

== Career as a journalist ==
25 years of Streek's long career as a political journalist was spent in the Parliamentary Press Gallery in Cape Town. In that role he was especially noted for his ability to find and legally publish news about the apartheid government that the government wanted to keep hidden from the public.

For most of this time Streek worked for South African Associated Newspapers which at the time included the Cape Times, the Eastern Province Herald, the Rand Daily Mail, the Sunday Express, and the Sunday Times. Streek was, at different times, chairperson, vice chairperson and president of the Cape Town Press Club. He became Parliament's media manager in 2001 before returning to the press gallery as a correspondent for the Mail & Guardian newspaper. After which he became editor-in-chief for publishing house Jonathan Ball.

== Death and legacy ==
He died after an 18-month battle with brain cancer in 2006.

In March 2006 SCAT renamed SCAT House, the organisation's headquarters in Cape Town city center, Barry Streek House and initiated a series of awards in honour of him. The Cape Town Press Club initiated a scholarship for people from previously disadvantaged backgrounds to study journalism at Rhodes University. In 2019 the Barry Streek Commemorative Garden was opened at Community House, Cape Town.

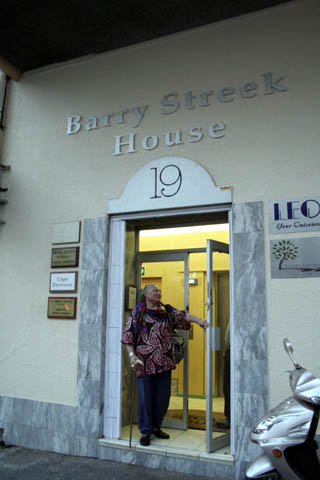
Barry Streek House at 19 Loop Street, Cape Town, South Africa.

== List of books ==
- Render Unto Kaiser: A Transkei Dossier. Ravan Press. 1981. ISBN 0-86975-206-5. Archived from the original on 23 May 2020.
- Survey of Race Relations in South Africa, 1983. Carole Cooper, Muriel Horrell, Barry Streek. South African Institute of Race Relations. ISBN 9780620076630
- The Rural Crisis in South Africa: Some Issues. SALDRU, School of Economics, University of Cape Town. 1984. ISBN 0-7992-0840-X.
