= South African Institute of Race Relations =

Organisation for socioeconomic policy and research in South Africa

- Abbreviation: IRR
- Formation: 1929; 97 years ago
- Registration no.: 1937/010068/08
- Legal status: Nonprofit; Public Benefit Organisation
- Purpose: Public policy advocacy
- Headquarters: 222 Smit Street, Braamfontein, Johannesburg, South Africa
- Coordinates: 26°10′51″S 28°00′45″E
- Region served: South Africa
- Chief Executive Officer: John Endres
- Staff: 30-50
- Website: irr.org.za

The South African Institute of Race Relations (IRR) is a research and policy organisation in South Africa. The IRR was founded in 1929 to improve and report upon race relations in South Africa between the politically dominant white group and the black, coloured, and Indian populations, making the Institute "one of the oldest liberal institutions in the country".

The Institute investigates socioeconomic conditions in South Africa, and aims to address issues such as poverty and inequality. It also aims to promote economic growth through promoting a system of limited government, a market economy, private enterprise, freedom of speech, individual liberty, property rights, and the rule of law. The IRR tracks trends in every area of South Africa's development, ranging from business and the economy to crime, living conditions, and politics.

Throughout most of its history of opposing segregation and Apartheid, the IRR has been regarded as liberal. In 1958, Gwendolen M. Carter wrote that "the Institute keeps close touch with non-European groups and over a long period of time has constituted itself as a spokesman for their interests." In more recent years the IRR and its work has also been variously labelled as right-wing (for instance by the academic Roger Southall and former Johannesburg mayor Herman Mashaba), conservative (in a New Frame editorial and by NEHAWU Western Cape secretary Luthando Nogcinisa), and reactionary (by former NUMSA spokesperson Irvin Jim), although it describes itself as adhering to classical liberalism.

During the periods of segregation and Apartheid, the IRR mostly drew its support from urbanites, tending to be from United Party-dominated parliamentary wards, who had a more "liberal" view on South Africa's race question.

Historian JP Brits argues that the IRR and its spiritual predecessor, the Joint Councils of Europeans and Africans, were the "most important extra-parliamentary organisations” to take an interest in the welfare of black South Africans. Both the Joint Councils and the IRR supported and had "native representatives" (whites chosen to represent blacks in Parliament) as their members and functionaries.

The IRR, alongside the Liberal Party, the Progressive Party, the Black Sash, the Civil Rights League, and the National Union of South African Students, according to Timothy Hughes, formed "the core of the 'liberal establishment'" in South Africa from the 1950s. In 1996, the academic Hugh Corder, and later critic, described the IRR as an important “national asset.”

== History ==
=== Inspiration and precursors ===
Charles Templeman Loram and Maurice Evans established the Native Affairs Reform Association in Natal in 1910. The association consisted only of whites. Loram was Chief Inspector of Native Education in Natal from 1917 to 1920, when he was appointed as a member of the South African government's Native Affairs Commission in 1920.

In 1921, Thomas Jesse Jones of the Phelps Stokes Fund and James Emman Kwegyir Aggrey visited South Africa, bringing with them the idea of the “inter-racial commissions” spearheaded by Will Winton Alexander in the Deep South of the United States. Alexander's Commission on Interracial Cooperation sought to “promote harmony” between white and black Americans toward the end of the First World War. John David Rheinallt Jones became the honorary secretary of the first "Joint Council" in South Africa, in Johannesburg, and is regarded as a founder of the Joint Council movement.

The Joint Councils replaced the Natal Native Affairs Reform Association and were multiracial in composition. Brits notes that the Joint Councils brought together church groups, including the prominent Dutch Reformed Church, university departments, the educational sector, journalists, civil servants, municipalities, and business. The members were from black groups, and it was mostly conservatives and moderates from the middle class that participated, even though the sentiment that led to the establishment of the councils was a liberal one.

The Joint Councils hosted National European African Conferences in 1924, 1929, and 1933, and one European and Coloured Conference in 1933.

=== Founding ===
Journalist Errol Byrne recounts the formation of the IRR as follows:

“On May 9, 1929 eight South African liberals met at the house of the Rev. Ray Phillips and his wife in Berea, Johannesburg. It was Ascension Thursday and a public holiday in South Africa. The meeting was called to order at 11 o’clock in the morning, and by the time it ended at 5 o’clock in the afternoon the Institute of Race Relations had been formed.”

The founders, according to Byrne, were Rheinallt Jones, Charles Loram, J Howard Pim (a government official), Edgar Brookes, Johannes du Plessis (a missionary and theologian), Davidson Don Tengo Jabavu (one of the first professors at the University of Fort Hare), JH Nicholson (Mayor of Durban), and JG van der Horst. Loram was chairman, Pim treasurer, and Jones secretary. According to Colin de Berri Webb the founders also included Alfred Hoernlé and Leo Marquard [af]. Michael Morris additionally writes that Thomas W Mackenzie, editor of The Friend newspaper of Bloemfontein, was present at the founding. At the founding meeting the organisation's name was planned to be the “Committee on Race Relations,” but the executive committee changed this after the meeting had ended to the “Institute of Race Relations.”

=== Bursary program ===
The IRR ran a bursary scheme between 1935 and 2023, which had by 1980 awarded 3,685 bursaries to primarily black students. By 2013 this program had awarded in excess of R230 million worth of bursaries. Nelson Mandela was awarded a bursary from the IRR in 1947 to complete his legal studies.

The program was discontinued on 31 December 2023.

=== Pride parade ===
South Africa's inaugural pride parade began with speeches at the IRR office on 13 October 1990. It was organized by former IRR employee, Simon Nkoli, an anti-apartheid, gay rights, and AIDS activist.

== Controversies ==
In June 2013, the IRR published a policy bulletin that challenged the concept of anthropogenic climate change, which gained significant media traction. The organisation has consistently advocated a position of climate change denial, stating in a 2023 Parliamentary stakeholder engagement on the proposed climate change bill that the IPCC is "a political advocacy group with a powerful vested interest in spreading climate fear"

In 2016, the IRR published a study whose results were critical towards South Africa's proposed Sugar Sweetened Beverage tax. Upon enquiry by journalists, it was revealed that the study was funded by Coca-Cola. IRR CEO Frans Cronje said that the IRR chose not to disclose this source of funding as "it was not at any stage considered exceptional, noteworthy or controversial". The IRR's public affairs officer Kelebogile Leepile said that the IRR intentionally approached groups who were likely to be negatively affected by the sugar tax and asked them to fund this research.

In December 2018, the IRR announced that it would be working with controversial cartoonist, Jeremy Talfer Nell, known as Jerm after he was fired by the civic organisation Organisation Undoing Tax Abuse for publishing a cartoon that discussed the link between race and IQ. The IRR defended their decision to hire Jeremy by saying that even though the link between race and IQ has been disproved, Asian-Americans still outperform Americans of other races with regards to income and education levels despite historically being victims of racism, and called Jeremy's firing “cowardly and disgraceful”. In May 2021, the IRR also fired Jeremy.

In March 2019, the IRR was criticized for working with columnist David Bullard after they announced that they were hosting an event with him at Stellenbosch University. The IRR went on to hire Bullard as a columnist for their online publication The Daily Friend. Bullard had previously attracted controversy for referring to black people as "darkies". The IRR's head of media Michael Morris defended the decision to platform Bullard, citing freedom of speech. Morris said "It takes courage to be willing to be offended and reply with reason. That is what freedom means. Outlawing what might offend us only enfeebles and disables reason itself."

In March 2020, David Bullard was fired from the IRR after he made a tweet defending the use of the racial slur kaffir.

In March 2019, the IRR called on lobby group AfriForum to retract a documentary that "seemingly sanitises the motives behind Apartheid and the brutality of its practices". When asked why AfriForum was listed as a funder in the IRR's 2015 and 2016 annual reports, as well as on their website, IRR CEO Frans Cronje stated "AfriForum have never funded the IRR. Someone put their name under funders in some of our documents and website which I only discovered once it was reported in the media."

On 1 June 2020, Cronje was forced to distance the IRR from comments made by one of its council members. IRR council member Unathi Kwaza tweeted: "Black people were better off under apartheid. It's time we admit this - at least those of us with honour." Cronje responded in a statement that "The broader IRR has always harboured a diversity of opinion among its structures and staff. However, the tweeted comment that apartheid was better than democracy does not accord with the position of the organisation or that of the great majority, almost without exception, of staff and office-bearers.".

== Leadership ==
=== Presidents ===
No.	Image	Presidents	Term of office	Notes
1		Charles Templeman Loram	1930-1931	
2		Edgar Harry Brookes	1931-1933	
3		Reinhold Friedrich Alfred Hoernlé	1933-1943	
4		Maurice Webb	1943-1945	
5		Edgar Harry Brookes	1945-1948	
6		Agnes Winifred Hoernlé	1948-1950	
7		John David Rheinallt Jones	1950-1953	
8		Ellen Hellmann	1953-1955	
9		Leo Marquard [af]	1955-1957	
10		Johannes Reyneke	1957-1958	
11		Donald Barkly Molteno	1958-1960	
12		Edgar Harry Brookes	1960-1961	
13		Oliver Deneys Schreiner	1961-1963	Retired judge of the Supreme Court of South Africa known for his liberal jurisprudence.
12		Denis Eugene Hurley	1963-1965	Roman Catholic Archbishop of Durban and opponent of Apartheid.
13		Ernst Gideon Malherbe	1965-1967	Educator and principal of the University of Natal.
14		Leo Marquard	1967-1968	
15		ID MacCrone	1968-1969	Professor of Psychology at the University of the Witwatersrand.
16		Sheila van der Horst	1969-1971	
17		William Frederick Nkomo & Duchesne Cowley Grice	1971-1973	Nkomo was a doctor and activist who co-founded the ANC Youth League, and Grice was a Durban attorney.
18		Duchesne Cowley Grice	1972-1973	
19		Bernard Friedman	1973-1975	Doctor and co-founder of the Progressive Party.
20		Ezekiel Mahabane	1975-1977	
21		Christopher John Robert Dugard	1977-1979	Professor of International Law.
22		René de Villiers	1979-1980	Journalist and Progressive Party MP.
23		Franz Auerbach	1980-1983	Educator and founder of Jews for Social Justice.
24		Lawrence Schlemmer	1983-1985	Professor of Social Sciences, University of Natal, and founder of the Centre for Social and Development Studies.
25		Stuart John Saunders	1985-1987	Medical researcher and Vice-Chancellor of the University of Cape Town.
26		Mmutlanyane Stanley Mogoba	1987-1989	Methodist minister and President of the Pan Africanist Congress.
27		Helen Suzman	1989-1992	Progressive Party MP.
28		William D (Bill) Wilson	1992-1994	
29		Hermann Giliomee	1994-1996	Historian.
30		Themba Sono	1996-2003	Academic and former President of the South African Student Organisation.
31		Elwyn Jenkins	2003-2007	Educator and principal of the Mamelodi Campus of Vista University.
32		Sipho Seepe	2007-2009	Professor, University of Zululand.
33		Jonathan Jansen	2009-2020	Professor of Education, University of Stellenbosch.
34		Russell Lamberti	2020-2024	Economist.
35		Mark Oppenheimer	2024-Present	Advocate of the High Court of South Africa.

=== Chief executives ===
No.	Image	Presidents	Term of office	Notes
1		John David Rheinallt Jones	1930-1947	1930-1944 as Adviser, thereafter Director.
2		Quinton Alexander Whyte	1947-1970	Director
3		Frederick Johannes van Wyk	1970-1979	Director
4		John Charles Rees	1979-1983	Director Said to have changed the IRR's focus from pure research to community participation.
5		John Kane-Berman	1983-2014	Chief Executive Officer
6		Dr Frans Cronje	2014-2021	Chief Executive Officer
7		Dr John Endres	2021-Present	Chief Executive Officer

== Other notable people ==
- Gwen Ngwenya – chief operating officer
- Peter Ralph Randall – assistant director
- Gareth van Onselen – head of politics and governance
- Helen Zille – senior policy fellow
- Simon Nkoli (1957-1998) – former employee who is known for his anti-apartheid, gay rights, and AIDS activism
- Muriel Horrell (1910-1994) - Annual Survey researcher for 27 years and author of 41 IRR publications

== Sponsors and donors ==
The IRR has received donations and funds from:

- Anglo American Chairman's Fund
- Friedrich Naumann Foundation
- Graham McIntosh
- Haggie Charitable Trust
- Jack Silson Charitable Trust
- Johannes van der Horst Trust
- Julian Ogilvie Thompson
- Lombard Insurance Company
- Millennium Trust

The IRR also claims to receive significant crowdfunding through its Friends Initiative, having recorded some 9,537 active "friends" at the end of 2023 with an average donation of R74.39 ($4.11).

== See also ==
- Bantu Men's Social Centre
- Jan H. Hofmeyr School of Social Work
