= Phelps Stokes Fund =

Nonprofit fund

Phelps Stokes

The Phelps Stokes Fund (PS) is a nonprofit fund established in 1911 by the will of New York philanthropist Caroline Phelps Stokes, a member of the Phelps Stokes family. Created as the Trustees of Phelps Stokes Fund, it connects emerging leaders and organizations in Africa and the Americas with resources to help them advance social and economic development.

Some organizations Phelps Stokes has influenced or supported the founding of are UNCF, the Booker Washington Agricultural and Industrial Institute (BWI), the American Indian College Fund, the American Indian Higher Education Consortium, the Jackie Robinson Foundation, and the Association of Black American Ambassadors.

Phelps Stokes has contributed to education in the U.S. South and British colonial Africa.

The Phelps Stokes Fund may be no longer active or terminated. Either the organization has not filed a Form 990 in many years and appears to no longer be active, or they marked in their most recent Form 990 that they have closed down.

== Work in the United States ==
Phelps Stokes has published studies on social issues. In the United States, it commissioned studies of black intellectual potential for college education at the University of Virginia and the University of Georgia. Phelps Stokes also supported the Jeanes Teachers Program, which became a model for education in the rural South.

Edward Berman writes that between 1911 and 1945, Phelps Stokes "played a role in American Negro and especially in African education disproportionate to the rather meagre financial resources it contributed directly to these endeavors between 1911, when it was incorporated, and 1945. [Phelps Stokes'] endowment of slightly less than $1 million was small when compared with other philanthropic organizations established early in the twentieth century."

The original charter of Phelps Stokes (PS) included a focus on the needs of American Indians, particularly for the educational and human development of those who were historically underrepresented and marginalized. Throughout its history, PS has built upon this foundation in a variety of ways.

=== 1911–1941 ===
During the first thirty years, PS made small grants totaling approximately $19,000 for Indian schools, organizations, and scholarships. Its first grant was allocated in 1915 with $1,000 to Reverend Henry Roe Cloud and Professor F.A. McKenzie to conduct a preliminary survey of the state of Indian schools.

In 1926, PS gave a $5,000 grant to the Institute for Government Research (now the Brookings Institution) to conduct a research project under the leadership of Lewis Meriam. John Rockefeller Jr. provided primary financial underwriting for that program. The report, The Problem of Indian Administration, commonly known as the Meriam Report, served as the basis in the 1930s for the Roosevelt Administration's policy towards American Indians. This policy, a break from previous policies, urged the U.S. government to allow American Indians to exist as culturally unique peoples and to retain reservation land bases in their control. The policy also established most of the contemporary tribal governments through the Indian Reorganization Act.

In 1939, the Indian Rights Association (IRA) requested assistance to study the controversy over range management on the Navajo Reservation. Phelps Stokes provided $1,800 for the study. This inquiry was eventually published by Thomas Jesse Jones as The Navajo Problem: An Inquiry. One aspect of that study was Ella Deloria's The Navajo Indian Problem. That year, PS also helped found the American Indian Institute in Wichita, Kansas under the leadership of Henry Roe Cloud.

=== 1942–1969 ===
Phelps Stokes' involvement in American Indian communities waned after World War II until the appointment of Dr. Wilton Dillon as Executive Secretary and Director of Research in 1957. During the initial years of Dillon's leadership, PS became involved in planning studies and conferences related to American Indian development. This assistance typically came in the form of $1,500 grants to organizations such as Arrow, Inc., An affiliate of the National Congress of American Indians.

In 1958, Phelps Stokes provided $1,500 for a group of American Indian leaders to travel to Puerto Rico. There, the group studied a local community development program, which resulted in scholarships for Indian students to study at the University of Puerto Rico. On a smaller scale, PS informally helped the Museum of Primitive Art in New York to organize an art exhibit.

In 1960, Dillon organized a symposium on American Indian economic development during the annual meeting of the Society for Applied Anthropology held at the University of Pittsburgh. Over the next several years, PS continued to provide small grants for projects, such as a1961 grant of $500 for a photographic study of Navajo education. In 1963, Dillon represented PS at the National Congress of American Indians Leadership Conference where PS- sponsored discussions focused on juvenile delinquency, law enforcement, land tenure problems and relationships with state governments.

=== 1970s ===
In 1970, Franklin Williams became president of Phelps Stokes. Williams arranged communication with organizations, such as the American Indian Community House, to improve Phelps Stokes' presence in American Indian communities. He also secured grants from US AID to support two programs to bring Africans to US universities.

The following year, PS began work on the American Indian Reference Book, modeled after its American Negro Reference Book, using a $7,500 Ford Foundation grant. Fred Dockstader, Director of the Museum of the American Indian in New York, was a member of the committee. The Museum was later absorbed by the National Museum of the American Indian (NMAI). Because the Smithsonian Institution was launching a more extensive Native American Reference Book, PS ceased its efforts and returned the remaining grant money to the Ford Foundation in 1975.

In 1973, Tom Katus joined PS as Program Coordinator. Katus assisted the development of the American Indian Higher Education Consortium (AIHEC) and initiated PS's Indian Educational Development Internship Program. Discussions began with the Bureau of Educational and Cultural Affairs at the U.S. Department of State to develop International Indigenous Educational Exchange Programs for American Indians and indigenous groups throughout the world.

Phelps Stokes implemented an international Indian educational exchange conference by enabling a Navajo Community College staff member to participate in an exchange with Caribbean and African educators. It also helped found the Turtle Mountain Community College in Belcourt, North Dakota. In 1974, PS started to develop the American Indian College Fund, based on the model of the United Negro College Fund whose creation Phelps Stokes supported. Barbara Bratone, Development Officer at PS, helped AIHEC launch AICF, and offices were initially located at the Phelps Stokes headquarters in New York City.

PS, the Johnson Foundation, and AIHEC co-sponsored the first philanthropic conference ever held in "Indian Country." More than 40 philanthropists from throughout the United States attended a conference at the Chief Gall Inn on the Standing Rock Sioux Reservation. As a result of that meeting, PS and AIHEC published a report on Indian Higher Education and Philanthropy. Baker, Martin and Katus conducted the research and wrote The Directory of American Indian Private Funding Sources, published by AIHEC. This directory was reviewed by The Foundation News as "the best [funding directory] ever published."

In 1975, Paige Baker Jr. became the Director of American Indian Programs at PS, where he continued to develop international exchange programs with Ghana, South Africa's Bantustans, Kenya, and Latin American Indians.

In 1976, Phelps Stokes secured an initial grant to launch the Native-American Philanthropic News Service (NAPNS), to be directed by journalist Rose Robinson (Hopi). She published The Exchange, a quarterly publication for information exchange between Indians and the philanthropic world; The Roundup, news briefs and opportunities for Indian groups; Bulletins, an information piece on meetings and events; and the famed Red Book, a pocket-sized directory updated quarterly of all key federal officials with an interest in Native American programs. In 1977, Robinson succeeded Baker as Director of Phelps Stokes' Native American programs.

In 1977, Katus established the western office of Phelps Stokes, located in Rapid City, South Dakota, and launched the Rural Ethnic Institute. One Feather and Katus co-hosted the Red-White TV Dialogue. For seven years, this program was broadcast on over 20 commercial television stations in eight states, reaching an audience of 4.3 million viewers. In 1977, PS created an Indian Advisory Board, which toured Mexico and Guatemala to assess an exchange program between Central and North American Indian groups.

The Phelps Stokes' American Indian Program relied primarily on grants from foundations and corporations, including General Mills Foundation, Donner Foundation, Aetna Foundation, Rockefeller Foundation, New Land Foundation, Edna McConnell Clark Foundation, AMAX Corporation and Union Carbide. By the end of the 1970s, the Phelps Stokes budget for American Indian programs was $114,000.

From the USAID grants, PS enacted programs to bring civil servants in Departments of Agriculture from Botswana, Lesotho, and Swaziland to US universities, aiming to improve their understanding and knowledge of agricultural policies and economics. A second grant brought students from west Africa to US community colleges to learn the basics of becoming paramedics. PS also managed a program to help African students across the US at colleges and universities with short-term financial emergencies through the African Student Aid Fund. Students could apply for emergency money less than $500 per grant for unexpected expenses, allowing many of them to stay in school.These programs continued through the 1980s.

=== 1980s and 1990s ===
In the 1980s, PS continued doing international exchanges. In 1983, PS staff traveled to West Africa (Nigeria, Ivory Coast, Sierra Leone, and Morocco) to study legal and educational institutions in those countries in comparison to American Indian institutions. Rose Robinson became a Vice President of Phelps Stokes. PS worked with the Native American Science Association as on the suicide prevention work of Zelma Minthorn. Phelps Stokes' involvement with American Indian issues waned again in the 1990s. Under leadership of Ambassador Franklin Williams, the Fund acted against apartheid by hosting members of the ANC and the Africa Roundtable as well as publishing talks by Bishop Desmond Tutu, Nelson Mandela and Wole Soyinka. The Arts and Letters Series initiated public programs with writers and artists, including Toni Morrison, John Oliver Killens, Catherine James Catti and John Williams. Fundraising events like the annual African Art Auction and the Gala at the United Nations took place.

=== 21st century ===
Badi Foster became Phelps Stokes' sixth president in 2001. In 2007, Phelps Stokes hosted a three-day conference and film festival at the Fond du Lac Ojibwe School in Cloquet, MN. One of the other major projects of Phelps Stokes was its involvement as a national programming organization for the State Department's International Visitor Leadership Program.

== Work in Africa ==
=== General ===
Phelps Stokes convened several commissions to study the educational conditions and needs of Black Africans, and made recommendations for improving access and quality. Dr. James E. K. Aggrey, known as "the Booker T. Washington of Africa," helped to lead the commissions and formulate a comprehensive model for education.

Phelps Stokes supported the DuBois Center for Pan-African Culture in Accra, established in 1985 as a national monument of Ghana.

Phelps Stokes' relationship with South Africa began in 1929 with the establishment of the South African Committee on Race Relations, which later became the South African Institute of Race Relations. The Fund also operated the Archbishop Desmond Tutu Southern Africa Refugee Scholarship Fund and the Southern African Scholarship Fund, which in the 1980s provided free college education to hundreds of black young adults from southern Africa.

=== Liberia ===
The Phelps Stokes family assisted freed U.S. slaves to settle in Liberia, and the first flag of Liberia was sewn in the home of Anson Phelps Stokes in the mid-nineteenth century. The first President of Liberia, Joseph Jenkins Roberts, knew both Anson Greene Phelps and Thomas Stokes. Anson Phelps provided funding for a theological department in Liberia, which led to the founding of Liberia College in 1851. Between 1911 and 1946 many African students passed through the office, receiving almost $21,000.00 in educational support.

In 1898, Caroline Phelps Stokes, Anson's granddaughter, endowed the Roberts Memorial Scholarship at Tuskegee College in honor of the first president of Liberia. In addition to the scholarship Caroline also left money to support the creation of the Phelps Stokes Fund upon her death in 1909. Through this bequest, the Phelps Stokes Fund was officially established in 1911. Phelps Stokes has maintained, with only brief interruptions due to war, an official presence in Liberia since the 1920s.

In 1924, the Fund convened an Advisory Committee on education in Liberia led by James Sibley, a proponent of the Booker Washington education philosophy. The Committee concluded that most of the work conducted by religious missions was superficial and lacked contact with the community. Sibley later organized a teacher lecture series attended by 95% of teachers in Liberia and ultimately persuaded the government to contribute money towards publication of textbooks adapted to Liberian and West African conditions. In 1927, Sibley organized the Association of Jeanes Teachers for Liberia which supported the expansion of the Methodist Episcopal's St. Paul River Industrial Institute and changed its name to the Booker Washington Institute. In late 1927, the Liberian Legislature granted a charter to the Association to incorporate the Booker T. Washington Agricultural and Industrial Institute. At the same time, Ms. Olivia Egleston Phelps Stokes, whose bequest established the Phelps Stokes Fund, provided significant financial support to the newly established Booker Washington Institute, and the fund has continued to work with the institute. Phelps Stokes President Badi Foster accepted appointment to the BWI Board of Governors in spring 2008.

Phelps Stokes also contributed to the development of other postsecondary education institutions in Liberia. Specifically, Phelps Stokes helped to develop the curricula and training faculty at Cuttington College and hosted Cuttington College in exile at the Phelps Stokes offices in New York City during the height of the Liberian civil war. Phelps Stokes supported the development of the Ricks Institute in Virginia, Liberia. When the Liberian civil war ceased temporarily in 1997, the Fund implemented a training program for former combatants at the Booker T. Washington Institute (BWI) in collaboration with USAID. As a result of this program nearly 2,500 Liberians were trained as artisans and skilled technicians. In addition to this training program, the library and several buildings at BWI were also renovated.

In 2006, the Phelps Stokes Fund created the Girls and Women's Empowerment and Leadership program using radio and information communications technology aiming to give a voice to victimized girls and women of Liberia. The program delivered non-formal and formal educational information to individuals, particularly women and young people, who lacked access to traditional schools. Phelps Stokes partnered with local organizations to form radio clubs whose members learned the technical components of producing content for dissemination via community radio stations, satellite radio, and other media outlets. In 2007, this program expanded to free computer and adult literacy courses to the underserved population of Monrovia. Other Phelps Stokes initiatives in Liberia include convening a joint advisory committee on education, appointing an educational advisor to support the Liberian government, performing multiple third-party needs assessments on education in Liberia, and fielding and funding proposals for private sector projects.

== Presidents ==
- 1911–1946 Anson Phelps Stokes II
- 1946–1947 Jackson Davis
- 1947–1958 Isaac Newton Phelps (Ike) Stokes II
- 1958–1969 Frederick Douglass Patterson
- 1970–1990 Franklin Williams
- 1990–2000 Wilbert J. LeMelle
- 2000–20?? Badi Foster
- 2012–2013 Pape Samb

In 1958, the Phelps Stokes Board of Trustees changed the title of president to Chairperson of the Board and changed the title of Educational Director to President. Educational directors prior to this transition were:

- 1917–1945 Thomas Jesse Jones
- 1946–1953 Channing Tobias
- 1953–1958 Frederick Patterson

== Notable trustees ==
- Ralph J. Bunche
- The Most Rev. Desmond Tutu (Honorary)
