= Winifred Hoernlé =

South African anthropologist and social reformer

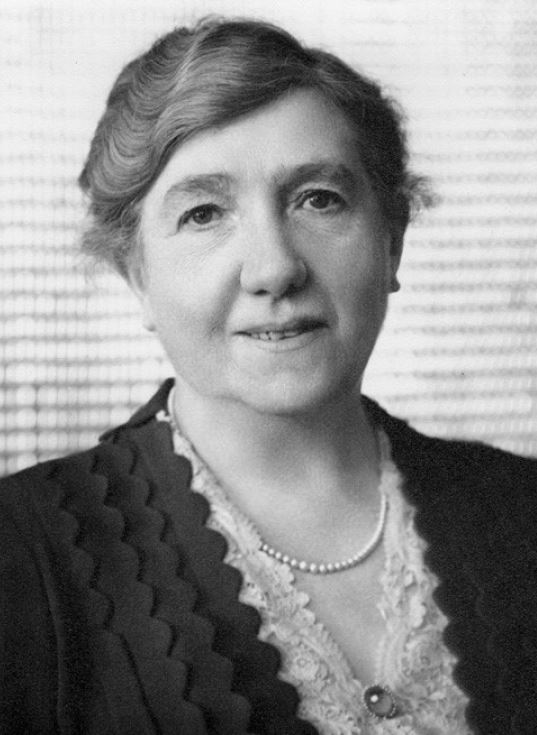
- Hoernlé in 1944, by Leon Levson
- Born: Agnes Winifred Tucker; 6 December 1885; Kimberley, Cape Colony, British Empire
- Died: 17 March 1960 (aged 74); Johannesburg, South Africa
- Other names: A. Winifred Hoernlé, Agnes Winifred Hoernlé, Winifred Hoernle, Winifred Tucker Hoernle
- Education: South African College; Newnham College; Leipzig University; University of Bonn; College of Sorbonne
- Occupation: Anthropologist
- Spouse: Reinhold Friedrich Alfred Hoernlé (m. 1914)
- Father: William Kidger Tucker

Agnes Winifred Hoernlé née Tucker (6 December 1885 – 17 March 1960) was a South African anthropologist, widely recognized as the "mother of social anthropology in South Africa". Beyond her scientific work, she is remembered for her social activism and staunch disapproval of Apartheid based on white supremacy. Born in 1885 in the Cape Colony, as an infant she moved with her family to Johannesburg, where she completed her secondary education. After earning an undergraduate degree in 1906 from South African College, she studied abroad at Newnham College, Cambridge, Leipzig University, the University of Bonn, and the Sorbonne. Returning to South Africa in 1912, she undertook anthropological research among the Khoekhoe people, until she married in 1914.

After settling with her husband in Boston from 1914 to 1920, Hoernlé returned to South Africa to resume her research. She partnered with Alfred Radcliffe-Brown in a collaborative effort to establish social anthropology as an academic discipline. In 1926, embarking on an academic career, she established both a library and an ethnological museum to facilitate her students' learning. Introducing innovative teaching ideals, she encouraged her students to evaluate social change, as well as the roles of women in society. On her retirement from teaching in 1937, she spent the rest of her life focusing on social reforms. Hoernlé's anthropological studies and teaching had informed her world view, leading her to become an opponent of separatist Apartheid policies. She argued in reports submitted to the government that all cultures which were part of the greater single society of South Africa had intrinsic value and that no race was superior. She espoused protection of fundamental principles such as equal opportunity without conditions of race and colour, supporting freedom of conscience and expression and the rule of law for all Africans.

In her lifetime, Hoernlé was honoured with numerous awards for her academic work and her social reform programmes. She received an honorary Doctor of Laws in 1945, which recognized both aspects of her career. She is remembered for training most of the leading South African anthropologists of her era and for laying the foundations for the development of social anthropology in South Africa.

== Early life ==
Agnes Winifred Tucker was born on 6 December 1885 in Kimberley in the Cape Colony of the British Empire to Sarah Agnes (née Bottomley) and William Kidger Tucker. She was the second child in a family of eight children. Soon after her birth, attracted by the Witwatersrand gold discoveries, her father relocated the family to Johannesburg, South Africa, where he worked as a surveyor and miner. He later became mayor of Johannesburg and a federal Senator of Transvaal. Tucker was a sickly child and suffered from diphtheria, measles, and pneumonia, which left her with a life-long susceptibility to bronchitis. Her father, who supported women's education, kept her supplied with books to read when she was confined.

=== Education ===
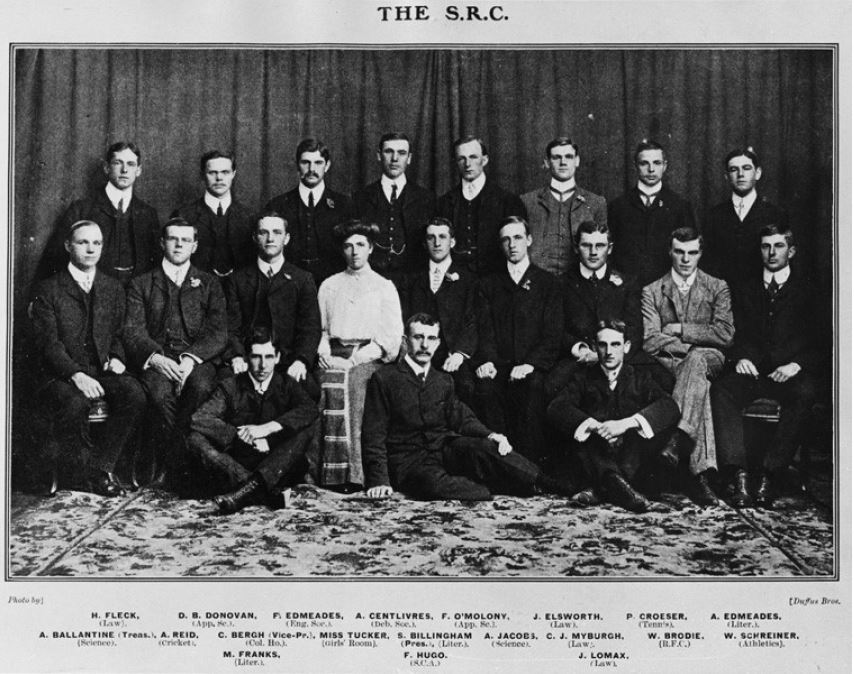
Members of the Student Council of South African College in 1905.

Tucker attended Fanny Buckland School but at the beginning of the Second Boer War was evacuated with her family to East London. When they returned to South Africa in 1900, she studied at the Wesleyan High School for Girls in Grahamstown, matriculating in 1902. Hoping to become a teacher, with encouragement from her father, Tucker enrolled the following year at Cape Town's South African College (later the University of Cape Town), studying classics, French and philosophy. A "star student", she won prizes in both English and philosophy and in 1906 became the first and only woman to serve on the student council. As a spinal nerve condition impacted her ability to write, her work was typed with the assistance of an amanuensis, and she was given extra time to write her bachelor's examinations, which she passed with honours.

Influenced by her philosophy professor, Thomas Loveday, Tucker decided to continue her studies at Cambridge. Before she left South Africa, she met Reinhold Friedrich Alfred Hoernlé, who had been appointed professor of philosophy at South African College in 1908. Upon receipt of the Porter Scholarship, which provided her with a three-year funding of £150 annually, she enrolled in Newnham College in 1908. Studying anthropology and philosophy under Alfred Cort Haddon and W. H. R. Rivers, she attended lectures by James George Frazer and Alfred Radcliffe-Brown and worked in Charles Samuel Myers' laboratory. As there was no diploma available for anthropology at that time at Cambridge, Tucker did not sit for exams when she finished her studies in 1910. Moving to Leipzig University in 1911, she studied under Wilhelm Wundt and then with his student and structural psychologist, Oswald Külpe, at the University of Bonn. In 1912, she completed her education in Paris at the Sorbonne under Émile Durkheim, founder of the academic discipline of sociology.

== Career ==
=== Fieldwork and domestic life (1912–1922) ===
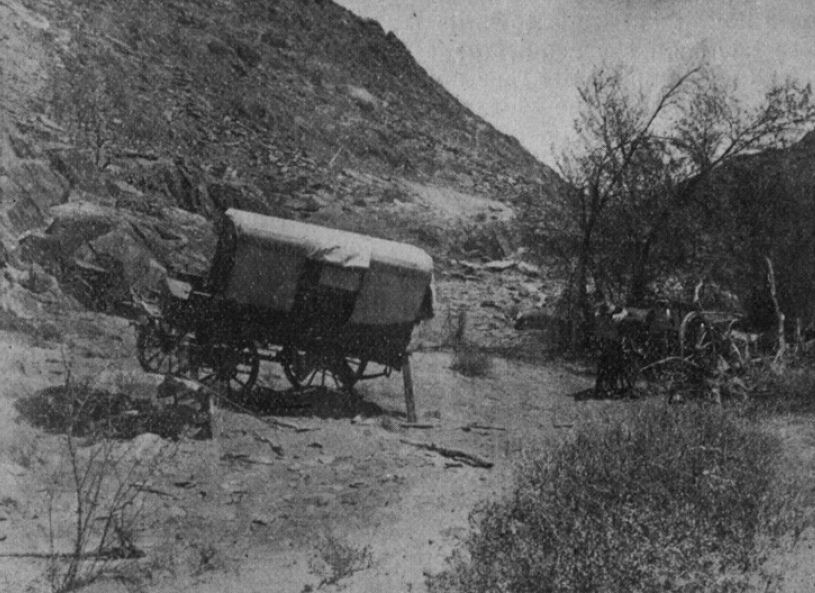
Broken-down wagon used by Hoernlé on her 1912 expedition

Returning to South Africa in 1912, Tucker applied to replace "Alfred" Hoernlé as philosophy chair at the South African College. Though he had moved to Durham University, the selection committee at the College asked Alfred to explain to Tucker that she was unsuitable because of her gender. Rekindling their acquaintance, the two became correspondents. When she turned down the selection committee's offer of an unpaid lectureship, she was awarded the college's Croll Scholarship to enable research among the Khoekhoe people. She made two expeditions, one to Richtersveld and the other to Berseba between 1912 and 1913, taking notes on the Nama and San people along the Orange and Kuiseb Rivers. She encountered many difficulties travelling from place to place in a horse-drawn wagon. She found it even more difficult to gain consent for her to measure the limbs of her subjects, test them for colour perception, or compile general cultural information. Though her field work was supposed to last for three years, in 1913 Tucker accepted a proposal of marriage from Alfred, resigned her scholarship, and joined him in England in 1914.

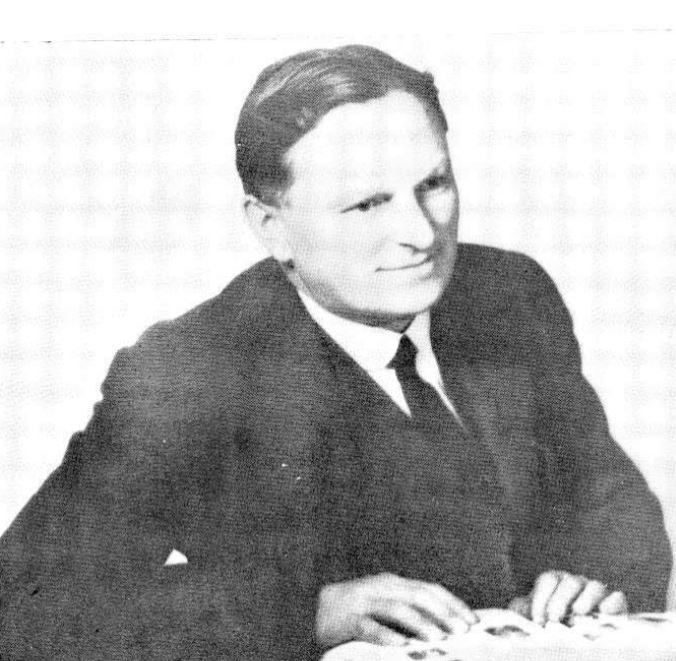
Alfred Hoernlé

The couple married in Oxford and in April 1914, moved to Boston, Massachusetts, where Alfred had taken a post as a philosophy professor and chair at Harvard University. Their only child, Alwin, was born in 1915 and Hoernlé spent most of her time in the United States in domestic pursuits, although she did contribute an article "Certain Rites of Transition and Conception of !Nau among the Hottentots" to the journal Harvard African Studies in 1918. The work represented the first time that Van Gennep's model on rites of passage had been applied to ethnographic data in southern Africa. As the severe winters in Boston caused Hoernlé repeated bronchial problems, in October 1920 she returned to Johannesburg where she lived with her parents, while Alfred remained in Boston for two more years.

In 1921, Hoernlé became a founding member of the publication committee of the journal Bantu Studies, becoming the only woman to serve on the editorial board until the 1930s. While planning an expedition to South West Africa for December 1922, the month before her departure, she met Radcliffe-Brown, who encouraged her to abandon physical examination of her subjects and focus on collecting data relating to kinship. The trip was sponsored by the government and was intended to provide evidence of the need to establish segregated land reserves for the rural Nama people. South Africa had recently acquired the League of Nations mandate to govern the former German colony, after German losses in World War I and five years of military rule. Instead of evaluating rural environments, Hoernlé's report focused on urban Nama and their grievances over taxation by authorities and missionaries in the shift of government. Dismissing her report as irrelevant, the government implemented land reserves as an official policy in 1923.

=== University faculty (1923–1937) ===
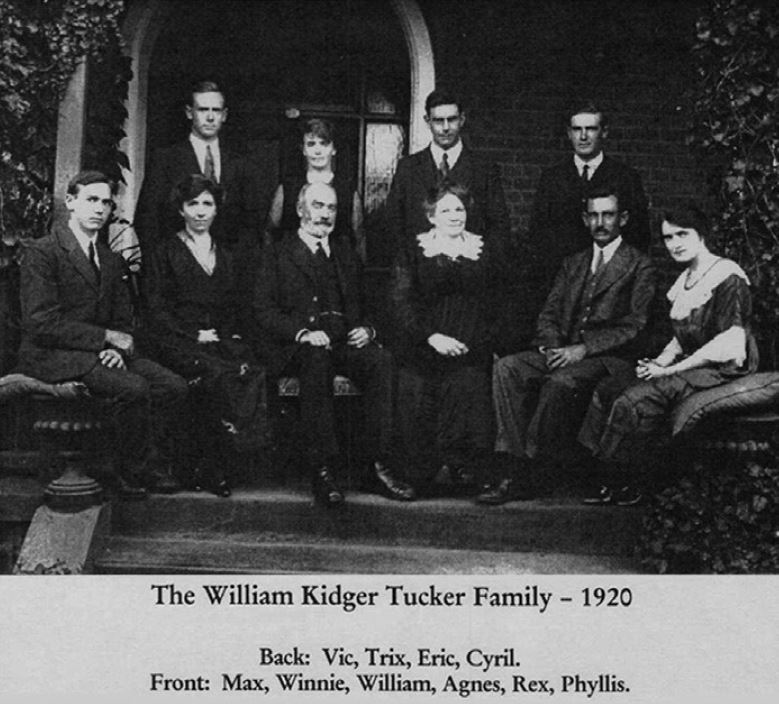
Tucker family, 1920 — back l-r: Vick, Trix, Eric, and Cyril; front, l-r: Max, Winifred Hoernlé, William Kidger Tucker, Sarah Agnes (née Bottomley), Rex, and Phyllis

In 1921, the University of Cape Town had hired Radcliffe-Brown as the first full professor of social anthropology at any British university throughout the Empire. He and Hoernlé carried out extensive correspondence regarding the formation of the new academic field of study and how it should be structured as a scientific discipline in South Africa. In 1922, Alfred was offered a post as head of the philosophy department at the University of the Witwatersrand. As an inducement to secure him, the university offered to hire his wife as a researcher and develop a social anthropology department. Hired in 1923, Hoernlé and Radcliffe-Brown's correspondence confirms that they were working until 1924 on several joint papers, covering ancestry and marriage rites, cattle, joking relationships, kinship terms, and sacrificial rituals. Radcliffe-Brown's decision to accept a position at the University of Sydney as head of the social anthropology department in 1925, led Hoernlé to abandon her field research in favour of teaching.

Hoernlé was appointed as a lecturer in January 1926 at the University of the Witwatersrand. As early as 1912, she had given lectures arguing that primitive or indigenous people had the same mental capacity as more sophisticated members of society, that their cultures should be examined with empathy and consideration of their perspective, and that social organization played a major role in indicating which societies survived and which societies failed. Her teaching style was "stimulating and thorough", and she inspired her students, "among the first in the field" to research cultural contacts and the problems associated with social change. She taught her students that traditional cultures were not separately operated and contained societies, but instead part of the greater single society of South Africa. Her views and those of her students who followed her lead were increasingly at odds with Afrikaner anthropologists and the later apartheid government, who accepted a static, primitivist model of traditional cultures.

Hoernlé challenged her students with innovative theories which laid the groundwork for development of the field of social anthropology. She encouraged them to observe and preserve social and cultural aspects of women's lives. Dora Earthy, a missionary in Mozambique, wrote a unique monograph focused solely on Valenge women, but other students incorporated information on female rituals within the family into their works, including initiation rites and those associated with marriage and conjugal relations. Their studies caused her students to compare the lives of indigenous women with the restrictions placed on Western women, and they discovered African women did not typically have the same social curtailments.

In addition to her focus on building an anthropological department, to facilitate her students' studies, Hoernlé created a library and an archaeological specimen and cultural museum. To provide them with a thorough grounding, she sent her best students to the London School of Economics to study ethnographic field work methods and functionalism with Bronisław Malinowski. As an external examiner on anthropological theses, Hoernlé came in contact with Isaac Schapera in 1925. He used her early research in his thesis and upon his graduation, they worked together to promote social anthropology grounded in field work. She took a leave and went to study with Malinowski herself in 1929.

While she was away, Schapera taught Hoernlé's classes and from her return in 1930, they collaborated on the Inter-University African Studies Committee. In their work, they shaped the committee in developing a national project to further ethnographic studies through adequate funding and cooperation among scholars throughout the continent. Hoernlé was promoted to senior lecturer in 1934. Under her guidance, pioneering urban anthropological studies were undertaken in South Africa and first published in 1935. That year, Bantu Studies dedicated their September 1935 issue as a "homage to Winifred Hoernlé" and she was granted the unusual distinction of being "made an Honorary Fellow of the Royal Anthropological Institute". She resigned from her post in 1937 to care for her and Alfred's ageing parents.

=== Social activism (1932–1960) ===
During her time at university in Cape Town, Hoernlé (Tucker at the time) had begun developing a liberal attitude towards race relations. Unlike her father, she believed that educated Africans should be able to vote. In her field work, she developed empathy for the people she was studying, especially in urban communities. Thanks to her fluency in Afrikaans, English, and German, she was able to communicate more intimately with her subjects. By 1932, when she joined the Committee of the Johannesburg Child Welfare Society, Hoernlé had developed not only a commitment to justice, but a sense of responsibility for social service. She served as president in 1938 and 1939 of the National Women's Organisation and upon her husband's death in 1943, became president of the South African Institute of Race Relations for two years, serving subsequent terms from 1948 to 1950 and from 1953 to 1954.

Rapid industrialization and urbanization in the 1930s and 1940s challenged the existing systems of legal jurisdiction in South Africa, which had formerly allowed rural people to indirectly govern themselves. As people moved in large numbers to urban areas to work in factories, security became a major issue, as did fear of crime. Several commissions — the Elliot Commission (1943), the Fagan Commission (1946), and the Sauer Commission (1947) — each attempted to deal with crime, laws regulating mobile populations, and potential threats to the communities. During this period, Hoernlé became a vocal advocate of liberal universalism. In 1945, she was appointed as one of the founding members of the Penal and Prisons Reform Commission. The commission became an important sounding board for conceptualising ideas about race in a reform-minded platform incorporating paternalistic models of governance. It later became the Penal Reform League of South Africa, on which Hoernlé served as president for many years.

Hoernlé was one of the most prominent activists of the period in social welfare campaigns, stressing the need for collaboration between African, Indian and white women. She helped to establish clinics for mothers, she improved educational facilities and welfare services for children, and she worked on penal reform. Concerned for the depressed conditions in Indian communities, she opened the first schools for Indian girls and chaired the Committee of the Indian Social Welfare Association. In 1949, Hoernlé was given an honorary Doctorate of Laws from the University of the Witwatersrand in recognition of her contributions to academics and social welfare. (Note: Bank notes the significance of the degree being in law rather than anthropology, suggesting her importance in social reform and Gordon wrote that her moral stances were as important to her legacy as her academic contributions.) That year, the National Welfare Board appointed her as a member and her contributions to the Landsdown Penal Reform Commission Report were presented. They would be one "of the most important sections of the Commission's Report". In 1952, Hoernlé was honoured by the International Council for Child Welfare with their Medal of Merit and was recognized for her service to Africa with a medal from the Royal African Society. After the Bantu Education Act was enacted in 1953, she worked to reform its repressive language and argued that educational systems which did not take into consideration social customs practiced within communities estranged students from their communities. In 1955, the journal Race Relations of the South African Institute of Race Relations published a special issue to commemorate her 70th birthday.

== Racial views and "Christian Trusteeship" ==
In 1923, Hoernlé wrote that to be successful in implementing change and European-style administration among traditional populations, officials needed "a sound knowledge of the outlook and beliefs of the natives". She recognized that because the mechanisms of power in South Africa favoured white society, white culture was dominant. In her 1948 article, Alternatives to Apartheid, Hoernlé argued that any solution implemented to control racial relations must protect fundamental principles such as equal opportunity without conditions of race and colour, freedom of conscience and expression, and in accordance with the rule of law. While she acknowledged that traditional societies and western civilization might each have reasons to protect their culture and racial purity, Hoernlé maintained that no race was superior and each should mutually respect the other, guaranteeing to protect fundamental principles. She stated that if assimilation was unlikely, implementation of Apartheid required granting sovereign independence to traditional societies. By implementing such a plan, she reasoned societies could develop separate but equal institutions and customs which allowed each group to govern themselves and share the fundamental tenets of citizenship.

However, Hoernlé reiterated that the test of commitment to basic rights was to recognize that they applied to people who had previously followed different traditions, but were now members of a society that had such principles. She argued that failure to recognize that they were all one society and attempting to create separate but equal facilities would damage the economy, as well as humanity. Her seemingly contradictory approaches recognized that the situation was complex and might require employing various methods and policies in a period of "Christian Trusteeship" in order to reach solutions that supported the ethical beliefs of the society and provided stewardship to indigenous members who were part of that society. Along with other academics, many of whom were her former students, she was in favour of assimilation of all races into one society. In 1952, amid political unrest and pressure from black activists, Hoernlé joined 21 other white liberals in issuing a statement calling on the government to support equal rights and equal opportunities for "educated, politically conscious non-Europeans".

== Death and legacy ==
Hoernlé died on 17 March 1960 in Johannesburg. After her death, her contributions were obscured by scholars who claimed her scholarship was directed by Radcliffe-Brown and her social involvement was an extension of her husband's work. Letters from Radcliffe-Brown make it clear that Hoernlé's work was original scholarship and though she and Alfred were both liberals, her ideas on social reforms differed from his and predated her relationship with him. According to Robert Gordon, professor of anthropology at the University of Vermont, "she was the first trained female social anthropologist in the world". The historian Andrew Bank, of the University of the Western Cape has referred to her as the central figure in the development of social anthropology in South Africa in the interwar period, as she introduced a collaborative "series of methodological innovations that led to the creation of a professional, scientific, and... field-based ethnographic tradition". Coupled with her influence on the students she taught and mentored, including Max Gluckman, Ellen Hellmann, Eileen Krige, Hilda Kuper, Audrey Richards, and Monica Wilson, she shaped the field of social anthropology in South Africa. She has often been called the "Mother of Social Anthropology in South Africa", as most of the leading South African anthropologists of her era trained with her. Her tenure marked a shift in the make-up of scientists studying social anthropology from a male-dominated field to one where women were in the forefront.

== Selected works ==
- Hoernlé, A. W. (1918). "Certain Rites of Transition and the Conception of !Nau among the Hottentots". Harvard African Studies. 2. Cambridge, Massachusetts: The African Department of the Peabody Museum: 65–82. OCLC 37146621.
- Hoernlé, Mrs. R.F.A. (July 1923). "The Expression of the Social Value of Water among the Naman of South-West Africa". South African Journal of Science. 20. Johannesburg: South African Association for the Advancement of Science: 514–526. ISSN 0038-2353. OCLC 37146674.
- Hoernlé, Mrs. A. (December 1923). "South-West Africa as a Primitive Culture Area". The South African Geographical Journal. 6 (1). Johannesburg: South African Geographical Society: 14–28. Bibcode:1923SAfGJ...6...14H. doi:10.1080/03736245.1923.11882239. OCLC 896610309.
- Hoernlé, A. Winifred (January–March 1925). "The Social Organization of the Nama Hottentots of South West Africa". American Anthropologist. 27 (1). Washington, D. C.: American Anthropological Association: 1–24. doi:10.1525/aa.1925.27.1.02a00020. ISSN 0002-7294. OCLC 37146643.
- Hoernlé, Mrs. A. W. (November 1925). "The Importance of the Sib in the Marriage Ceremonies of the South-Eastern Bantu". South African Journal of Science. 22 (11). Johannesburg: South African Association for the Advancement of Science: 481–492. ISSN 0038-2353. OCLC 896452032.
- Hoernlé, A. W. (April 1931). "An Outline of the Native Conception of Education in Africa". Africa. 4 (2). Edinburgh: Edinburgh University Press for the International African Institute: 145–163. doi:10.2307/1155972. ISSN 0001-9720. JSTOR 1155972. OCLC 5546470135. S2CID 144061400.
- Hoernlé, A. W. (January 1948). "Alternatives to Apartheid". Race Relations. 15. Johannesburg: South African Institute of Race Relations: 90–91. OCLC 18819055.
- Hoernlé, A. W. (1950). Penal Reform 1950: A Review of the Development of Penal Reform since the Publication of the Teport of the Penal and Prison Reform Commission (Lansdown) (Report). Pretoria: Van Schaik's Publishing. OCLC 1037651838.
- Hoernlé, Mrs. A. W. (July 1968). "New Aims and Methods in Social Anthropology: Presidential Address to Section E, Delivered 4 July 1933". South African Journal of Science. 30 (7). Johannesburg: South African Association for the Advancement of Science: 74–92. ISSN 0038-2353. OCLC 8132668137.
