= Harriet Ngubane =

South African anthropologist (1929–2007)

Member of the National Assembly
- In office May 1994 – April 2004

Personal details
- Born: 11 November 1929 Inchanga, Natal Province; Union of South Africa
- Died: October 2007 (aged 77)
- Party: Inkatha Freedom Party
- Spouse: Jethro Sibisi
- Relations: Ben Ngubane (brother)
- Children: 7, including Sibusiso Sibisi

Academic background
- Education: University of Natal; University of Cambridge (PhD)

Academic work
- Discipline: Social anthropology
- Notable works: Body and Mind in Zulu Medicine (1977)

Harriet Ngubane (11 November 1929 – October 2007), formerly known as Harriet Sibisi, was a South African social anthropologist best known for her work on Zulu belief systems. Though educated in England, Ngubane spent the latter years of her career as a professor at the University of Cape Town. She represented the Inkatha Freedom Party (IFP) in the National Assembly from 1994 to 2004.

== Early life and education ==
Ngubane was born on 11 November 1929 in rural Inchanga near Pietermaritzburg in the former Natal Province. She was the third eldest of six siblings, among them former cabinet minister Ben Ngubane. She was raised on a Roman Catholic mission but in a Zulu family.

After matriculating at St Francis College in Mariannhill, she earned a bachelor's degree and then a master's degree in anthropology at the University of Natal, where she was mentored by Eileen Krige. She taught part-time at her former high school while studying at the university's Durban campus. She later studied social anthropology on a scholarship at Cambridge University, where she completed her PhD in 1972.

== Academic career ==
After completing her PhD, Ngubane returned to the University of Natal, where she worked as a research fellow at the Institute for Social Research. However, her professional prospects in South Africa were hindered by apartheid laws, and Ngubane spent a year in Birmingham, England as William Paton lecturer at Selly Oak. She received the Ioma Evans-Pritchard Fellowship in 1974 and spent another year at St Anne's College, Oxford, where she revised her PhD thesis for publication. Thereafter she was a lecturer at the University of Edinburgh in 1975 and a Ford Foundation research fellow at the Institute of Commonwealth Studies of 1976.

Ngubane's doctoral thesis was published as Body and Mind in Zulu Medicine (1977), an influential ethnographic study of conceptions of health and illness among the Nyuswa-Zulu. The book argued that Zulu conceptions of bodily health were closely related to notions of spiritual health and social wellbeing. Another central interest of Ngubane's research was social change, including as a result of colonialism and apartheid, and its effects on Zulu belief systems and cultural practices.

From 1978 to 1984, Ngubane worked for the United Kingdom Ministry of Overseas Development in Swaziland, and in 1985 she was an adviser to the United Nations's International Labour Office on policy regarding women's issues in Lesotho. In 1988, she returned to South Africa to become a professor of social anthropology at the University of Cape Town. Upon her return to South Africa, which coincided with the beginning of the country's democratic transition, she became involved in land reform activism and policy, including as a member of the Advisory Commission on Land Allocation, to which she was appointed by President F. W. de Klerk in 1991.

== Post-apartheid career ==
In South Africa's first post-apartheid elections in 1994, Ngubane was elected to represent the Inkatha Freedom Party (IFP) in the National Assembly. She served two terms, gaining re-election in 1999. In later years, she was involved in the design of Freedom Park and continued her academic research, which became increasingly political in the late 1990s.

== Personal life and death ==
Ngubane was married to Jethro Sibisi. They had seven children together, one of whom is Sibusiso Sibisi, a former chief executive officer of the Council for Scientific and Industrial Research. Ngubane published under her married name, Harriet Sibisi, for the early years of her marriage, but later went by her maiden name in a conscious identification with Zulu custom.

She died in October 2007 after a lengthy illness.
