= Jeremy Nell =

South African cartoonist

- Born: Jeremy Talfer Nell; 1979 (age 46–47) Cape Town, South Africa
- Area: Cartoonist
- Pseudonym: Jerm
- Notable works: Jerm Warfare

Jeremy Talfer Nell (born 1979) is a South African cartoonist who writes under the pen name Jerm. In 2020, his public page was removed by Facebook after repeatedly violating the social network's policies against hate speech. He was previously requested to retract a homophobic statement made on another social network, Twitter.

== Early life and education ==
Jeremy Talfer Nell was born in 1979 in Cape Town, South Africa. Nell attended Fairmont High School. After graduating, Nell went to study art and sculpture at the University of Cape Town but failed the course and dropped out.

== Career ==
Nell became a cartoonist in November 2005, after being retrenched. Nell did not complete formal art training.

Nell's first commercially published work and nationally syndicated comic strip Urban Trash (first published November 2005), ended 27 June 2008.

In 2010, Nell became the first political cartoonist for the newly launched The New Age, a pro-ANC daily newspaper. He was dismissed in 2012.

In 2012, Nell became the first political cartoonist for Eyewitness News. That year he cited Zapiro and Quentin Blake as being among his favourite cartoonists.

In 2013, Nell became the first political cartoonist for the eNCA television network.

In February 2014, Nell voiced his support for David Bullard when Bullard donated to a rape charity (who returned his donation) after being criticised for accusing rape survivor and activist Michelle Solomon of having faked her rape.

In December 2014, Nell was forced to apologise for making a homophobic remark online. After receiving heavy criticism for a tweet regarding the trial of Shrien Dewani, during which the prosecution heard that Dewani was bisexual, Nell apologised and retracted his statement.

In January 2020, after Democratic Alliance chairperson Helen Zille shared a controversial racial cartoon created by Nell, Facebook closed Nell's public page, which had nearly 60,000 followers. Nell said he had previously violated the site's rules against hate speech. According to Mail & Guardian critic Christopher McMichael, Nell's political cartoons portray black politicians as "baying for white genocide" and reveal crypto-fascist ideas about racial intelligence.

Nell worked for the South African Institute of Race Relations's online publication The Daily Friend between 2019 and 2021.

Nell joined TNT Radio in 2022 and hosts his own show. Jeremy Nell

== Publishing and awards ==
Penguin Books have published two cartoon collections by Nell, Jerm Warfare (2013) and Comedy Club (2014). Additionally, some of his work features in (and on the front cover of) the 2009 edition of the South African political cartooning annual Don't Joke: A Year in Cartoons, as well as in the 2010 edition, Just For Kicks.

Nell won the national 2011 Vodacom Journalist of the Year Cartoon of the Year award for his cartoon Africa 2.0.

The Mail & Guardian named Nell as one of their "Top 200 Young South Africans" in 2012.

Nell was a finalist at the 2014 Standard Bank Sikuvile Journalism Awards.
