= Ben Ngubane =

South African politician (1941–2021)

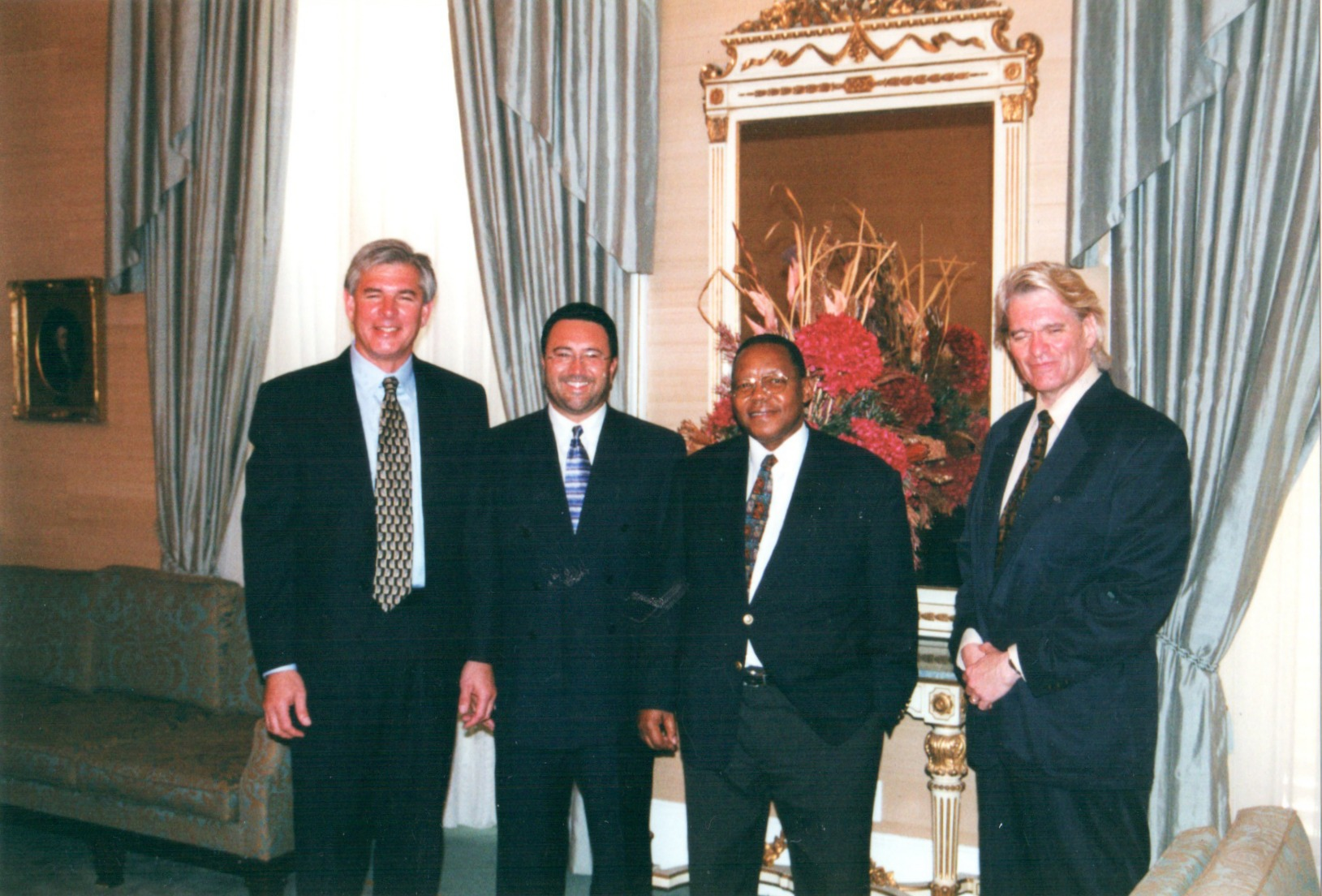
- Richard Hollis and Ben Ngubane

Ambassador to Japan
- In office 2004–2008
- President: Thabo Mbeki
- Succeeded by: Gert Grobler

Minister of Arts and Culture
- In office February 1999 – April 2004
- Succeeded by: Pallo Jordan

2nd Premier of KwaZulu-Natal
- In office 1 March 1997 – 9 February 1999
- Preceded by: Frank Mdlalose
- Succeeded by: Lionel Mtshali

Minister of Arts and Culture
- In office 11 May 1994 – 31 August 1996

Personal details
- Born: 22 October 1941 Camperdown, KwaZulu-Natal
- Died: 12 July 2021 (aged 79)
- Party: Inkatha Freedom Party (1976–2006); African National Congress
- Spouse: Sheila Ngubane
- Relations: Harriet Ngubane (sister)Nkanyeziyokusa Sihawukelwe Baldwin Ngubane (Grandson)
- Children: Zamabomvu Mary-Anne Annastasia Ngubane
- Education: University of Natal

Baldwin Sipho "Ben" Ngubane (22 October 1941 – 12 July 2021) was a politician from South Africa. He held multiple positions in the post-apartheid government of the country. In particular, he was Premier of KwaZulu-Natal from 1997 to 1999 and Minister of Arts, Culture, Science and Technology from 1994 until 31 August 1996 and from February 1999 until April 2004.

== Early life and career ==
Baldwin Sipho "Ben" Ngubane was born in 1941 at Inchanga Roman Catholic Mission in Camperdown outside Pietermaritzburg in what later became KwaZulu-Natal province. After attending St Francis High School, a mission school in the Durban suburb of Marianhill, he went to the Durban Medical School at the University of Natal in Durban, where he obtained an MBChB in 1971. He subsequently obtained diplomas in Tropical Medicine in 1982 and Public Health in 1983 from the University of Witwatersrand in Johannesburg, South Africa. He furthermore received a master's degree of Family Medicine (M Prax Med) from Natal Medical School (now the Nelson Mandela Medical School) in 1986 and a postgraduate diploma in Economics from the University of London in 2003.

While at the University of Natal, Ngubane was engaged in student politics, including through the National Union of South African Students, and he joined Inkatha in 1976. In 1991 he was appointed Minister of Health in the government of the KwaZulu homeland, a post he held until 1994. In 1992 Ngubane was part of Inkatha's delegation to CODESA; he served on a working group which dealt with constitutional principles and constitution-making. In 1993 he was involved in negotiations with the African National Congress (ANC) on behalf of Inkatha.

== Career in government ==
He was the first Minister of Arts, Culture, Science and Technology in the post-apartheid period from 1994 to 1996 in Nelson Mandela's Government of National Unity. Between 1997 and 1999, he was Premier of KwaZulu-Natal; after that, he returned to the Arts and Culture portfolio until 2004.

In 2004 he was appointed Ambassador to Japan, until 2008. He was viewed as having fallen out with Inkatha's Mangosuthu Buthelezi after he left the Premier's office, and in 2006 he defected to the ANC during a floor-crossing period.

He later served as chairperson of the South African Broadcasting Corporation (SABC) board and as chairperson of the Eskom board between 2015 and 2017.

In 2020, Ngubane was twice called to testify before The Judicial Commission of Inquiry into Allegations of State Capture in his capacities as, first, former SABC board chairperson, then, secondly, as the chairman of Eskom.

Ngubane died in Richards Bay on 12 July 2021 at the age of 79 from COVID-19 complications.

== Honours ==
He received an honorary LLD degree from the University of Natal in 1995. In 2010, Ngubane was awarded an honorary PhD degree from the University of the Free State for his "contribution towards positioning South Africa as a major and an influential player in the development of arts, culture, science and technology internationally". Later that year he also received the Grand Cordon of the Japanese Order of the Rising Sun for his contributions "to the enhancement of the relationship and the cooperation in science and technology between Japan and South Africa". He furthermore received an honorary PhD degree from University of Zululand, an honorary PhD degree from Sefako Makgatho Health Sciences University, and an honorary DHL degree from International Christian University (Tokyo, Japan).

== Personal life ==
Ngubane was Catholic.

| Preceded by Tsotsi, Z.A. | Chairperson of Eskom board 2015–2017 | Succeeded by Khoza, Z. |
