= Social Change Assistance Trust =

South African non-profit organisation

- Founded: November 1984; 42 years ago
- Founders: Barry Streek; Gordon Young; Di Oliver
- Type: Nonprofit organization
- Purpose: Community rights, activism, and rural poverty alleviation
- Location: Elta House, 3 Caledonian Road, Mowbray, Cape Town, 7700, South Africa
- Region served: Western Cape; Eastern Cape; Northern Cape; Free State
- Expenses: R7.2 million (2014) roughly equivalent to US$507,000
- Website: www.scat.org.za

The Social Change Assistance Trust (SCAT) is a South African non-profit advocacy organisation established in 1984 to advocate for human rights and social justice philanthropy.

SCAT focuses its projects in the rural areas of four South African provinces. The Western Cape, Eastern Cape, Northern Cape, and the Free State. It focuses on projects that are community centred and community driven with a primarily focuses on projects that tackle inequality and injustice. SCAT's primary function is as a grant making organisation that also provides capacity building and conducts project assessments of supported projects in rural areas.

== History ==
SCAT was established by Barry Streek, Gordon Young and Di Oliver in 1984 to help provide resources to poor rural communities that have been their right since the establishment of democracy in South Africa in 1994. Initial funding for the organisation came from the Church of Norway. SACT played an important role in the establishment of the Cape Town-based civil society center Community House in the mid-1980s.

African National Congress politician Nomaindiya Mfeketo worked for SCAT between 1991 and 1992 before entering politics.

== Activities ==
SCAT Assisted projects (1984–2014)
Province	Number of assisted projects
Western Cape	109
Eastern Cape	86
Northern Cape	35
Free State	3
Kwa-Zulu Natal	6
North West Province	1

As of 2006 the organisation worked with 58 rural partners. In 2005 the organisation experienced a short fall in funding due to declining commitments from established donors and inadequate fund-raising capabilities. This required the organisation to change its method of operation. This led the organisation to start scaling down operations, reduce administration staff, and balance budgets to rely on committed income streams. Between 1984 and 2014 SCAT reportedly supported 515 Local Development Agencies.
