= Eileen Krige =

South African anthropologist

- Born: 12 November 1904; Pretoria, Transvaal Colony
- Died: 1995
- Education: University of the Witwatersrand
- Spouse: Jack Krige
- Scientific career
- Fields: Social anthropologist
- Workplaces: University of Natal
- Thesis: Medicine Magic And Religion of the Lovedu (1940)

Eileen Jensen Krige (12 November 1904 – 1995) was a prominent South African social anthropologist noted for her research on Zulu and Lovedu cultures. Together with Hilda Kuper and Monica Wilson, she produced substantial works on the Nguni peoples of Southern Africa. Apart from her research she is considered to be one of the 'pioneering mothers' of the University of Natal, Durban, South Africa, where she taught from 1948 until retirement in 1970. She inspired many women to devote themselves to research. Krige is also associated with a group of South African anthropologists who were strongly against the segregation policies of apartheid in South Africa. These include amongst others, Isaac Schapera, Winifred Hoernlé, Hilda Kuper, Monica Wilson, Audrey Richards and Max Gluckman.

== Personal life ==
Krige married Jack Daniel Krige in 1928. Jack a nephew of J.C. Smuts and an advocate at the Transvaal Supreme Court, shared Krige's anthropological interests and subsequently accompanied her on most of her field trips. This might be closely linked to his earlier position as lecturer in Bantu Studies at Rhodes University College in Grahamstown. Together they were very successful in encouraging an interest in anthropology amongst African students. These include Absolom Vilikazi whose thesis Zulu Transformations was later published and Harriet Ngubane, famous for her book, Body and Mind in Zulu Medicine.

== Education and early career ==
Krige, who initially started a degree in economics, obtained a part-time honors degree in social anthropology from the University of the Witwatersrand in 1929. It was under the influence of Winifred Hoernlé, who started the formal teaching of social anthropology at the University of the Witwatersrand in 1923, that Krige decided to pursue her studies in anthropology. Krige later referred to Hoernle, as 'the mother of Social Anthropology in South Africa'. For her honor degree thesis, Krige focused predominantly on the Zulu which was published in 1936 entitled: The Social System of the Zulus During the course of her honors degree, Krige also pursued her interest in the Lovedu people of Modjadje in the northern region of South Africa. This led to a private visit in 1926 during which time she met the then reigning Rain Queen, Queen Majaji. Krige remained interested in the Lovedu and the tales she heard about their queen who is the rain-maker par excellence of South Africa. Thanks to a Fellowship of the International Institute of African Languages and Cultures obtained in 1936, Krige and her husband could do a detailed study of the Lovedu people which lasted until 1938. Krige obtained her DLitt from the University of the Witwatersrand in 1940 and in 1943 she and her husband published The Realm of a Rain-Queen: A Study of the Patterns of Lovedu Society.

=== The Realm of a Rain-Queen: A Study of the Patterns of Lovedu Society ===
In The Realm of a Rain-Queen Krige, in collaboration with her husband Jack, describes the cultures of the Lovedu people. According to Krige, the sacred Lovedu Queen is center to Lovedu society. Their culture emerges "as a structure supporting and in turn supported by the Rain-Queen". In this book Krige pays attention to amongst others the royal institutions, legal procedure of compromise and appeasement, magic, witchcraft, and religion.

== Later career ==
In 1948 Krige started her teaching career at the University of Natal, Durban. Her knowledge of Zulu society and culture enhanced the value of her teaching and contributed to her inspirational career as University professor and scholar. In addition she and her husband "instilled standards of integrity that went beyond the academic". Throughout her career Krige continued to do fieldwork amongst the Lovedu people. Even after her retirement as Chair of Social Anthropology in 1970, she continued to engage in ethnographic research. This included an interest in Zulu female fertility rituals as well as her lifelong interest in kinship and marriage. This led to a collaboration with John L. Comaroff entitled: Essays on African Marriage in Southern Africa which was published in 1981.

== Publications ==
1931 Agricultural Ceremonies and Practices of the Balobedu. Johannesburg: University of the Witwatersrand.

1936 The Social System of the Zulu. London: Longmans Green and Company.

1940: Medicine, Magic and Religion of the Lovedu. Johannesburg: University of the Witwatersrand.

1943 The Realm of a Rain-Queen: A Study of the Patterns of Lovedu Society. (Written with Jack Krige) London: Oxford University Press.

1954 The Lovedu of Transvaal. (Written in collaboration with Jack Krige).

1965 Report on an Ecological Study of the Thembe-Thonga of Natal and Mozambique (authored by W.S Felgate, Social Anthropology Honours Student of Krige) Durban: Institute for Social Research, University of Natal.

1962 The Social System of the Zulu. Pietermaritzburg: Shuter and Shooter Publishers.

1963 Culture Contact in Africa South of the Sahara. Johannesburg: South African Institution of Race Relations.

1975 Tradition and Christian Lovedu Family Structures.

1978 Social System and Tradition in Southern Africa: Essays in honour of Eileen Krige. (Written in collaboration with William John Argyle and Eleanor Preston-Whyte) London: Oxford University Press.

1980a Medicine, Magic and Religion of the Lovedu. Johannesburg: University of the Witwatersrand.

1980b African Techniques of Domination and State Formation: Their Relevance Today. Johannesburg: Witwatersrand University Press for the Institute for the Study of the Man of Africa.

1981 Essays on African Marriage in Southern Africa. Written with John L. Comaroff. Cape Town: Juta Publishers.

1985 Aspects of Change in the Social and Political Organization of the Lovedu, with special Reference to Re-Settlement and Family Structure.
