= Community House (Salt River, Cape Town) =

Historic site of living heritage

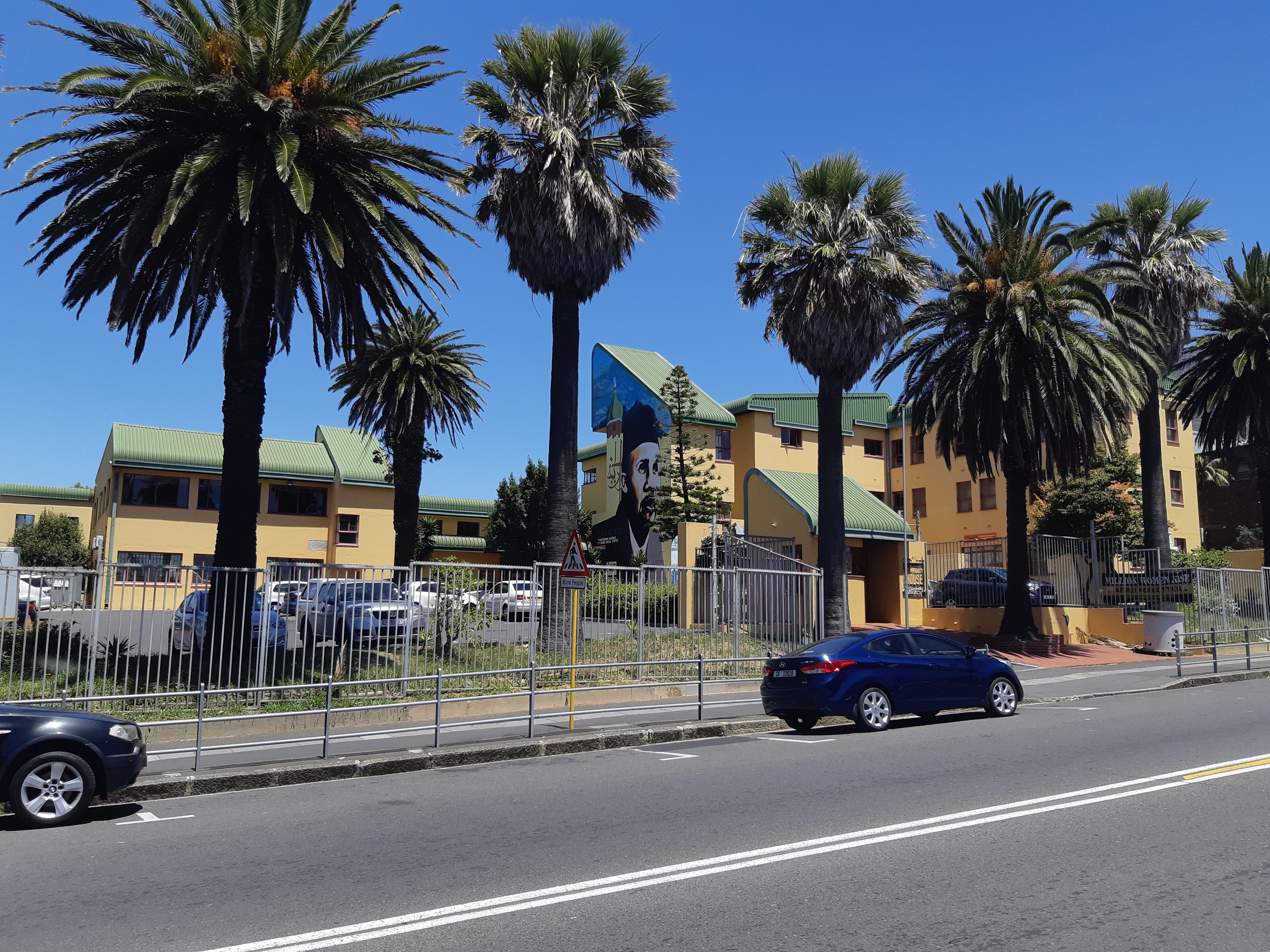
- Community House in 2020.

- Location within Cape Town

General information
- Location: Salt River, Cape Town, 41 Salt River Road, Salt River, Cape Town, 7925
- Coordinates: 33.929998°S 18.4576°E

Website
- communityhouse.org.za

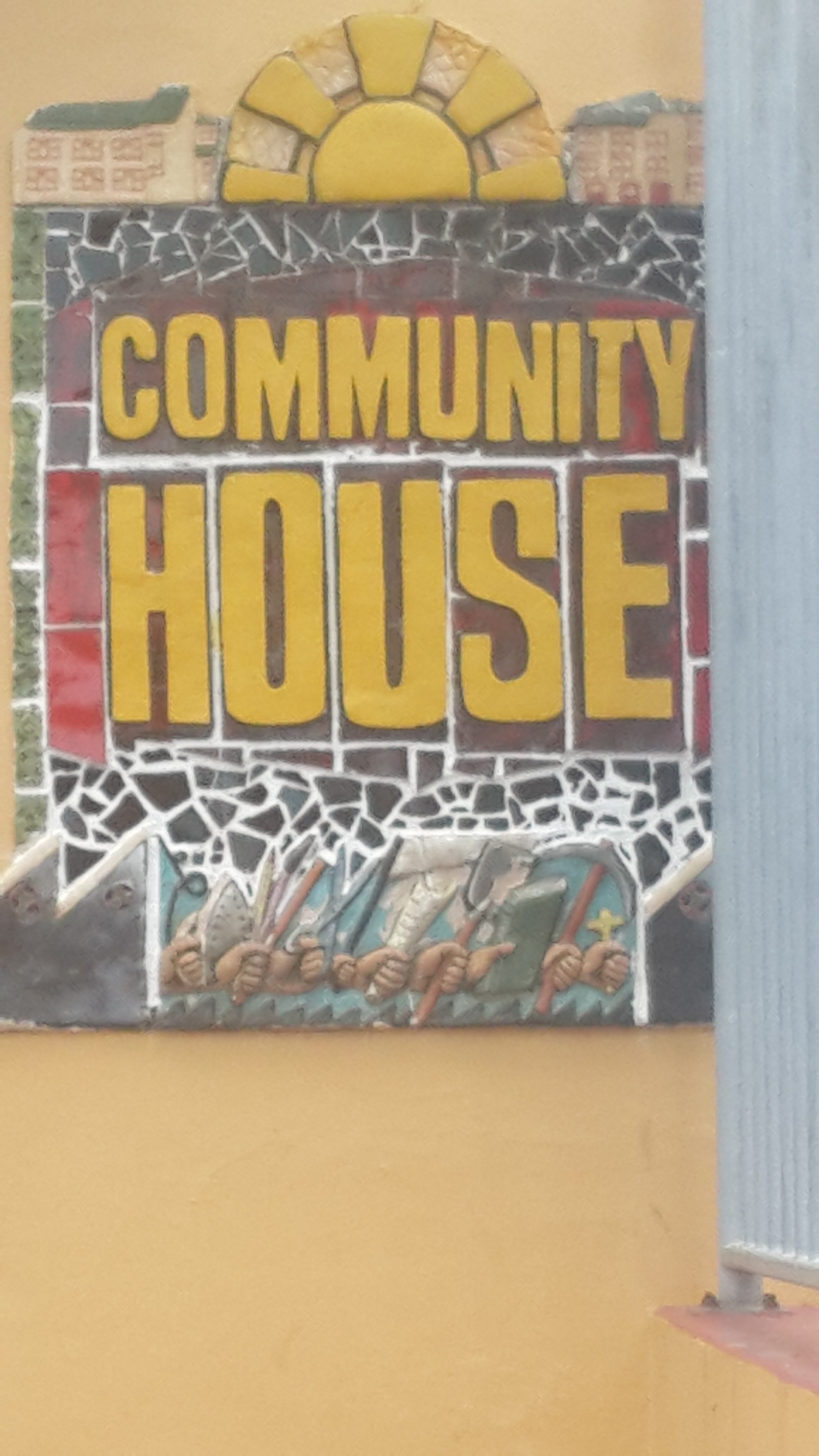
Name placard in front of Community House.

Community House situated in Salt River, Cape Town is a unique and historic site of living heritage. It has always been known as a site of activism from around the mid-1980s which has shaped and continues to shape the socio-political landscape of its extended communities. The building itself houses NGO's and Trade Unions as well as a labour and community history museum centered on the Trade Union Library and its archive. It presently houses twenty-four organizations that focus on labour research, popular education, gender advocacy, HIV/AIDS education, environmental issues, youth development, media production and union organization.

== History ==
In the mid-1980s, anti-apartheid trade unions and civic and service organizations began searching for a new headquarters for their resistance campaign. The Western Province Council of Churches (WPCC) and an NGO, the Social Change Assistance Trust (SCAT) met this need. They purchased a dilapidated auto workshop in Salt River, an area known for its textile and light metal factories and which marks the origins of industrial unions in the province.

== Heritage Significance ==
As a living heritage or intangible cultural heritage site, the significance if the site has the potential to change over time as new information arises and perspectives and interpretations change. The site was declared a provincial heritage site in 2010.

Apartheid South Africa in the mid-1980s experienced increasing levels of repression by the state. This led to a revival of the worker's movement and an increased effort in the struggle for liberation. Community House was the building used by the organisations that formed the backbone of the anti-apartheid and labour movement. From this site some of the largest strikes and anti-apartheid campaigns were organised. Most notably the historic Purple Rain Protest which took place in September 1989 and saw 100,000 people marching through the streets of Cape Town. This as well as many other meetings mark the building's heritage and historic significance. It is the only site in South Africa that provided and continues to provide a collective home for those involved in the broader labour movement. And, since its inception, the Congress of South African Trade Unions (COSATU), its union affiliates and organisations servicing and supporting workers, have been the backbone of Community House.

Community House is a centre that has preserved and commemorated the memory of many anti-apartheid activists who demonstrated selfless dedication to the struggle for the liberation of the South African people. Some of these heroes played a role in the revival of trade unions while others left the country for military training while others were forced into exile. All those commemorated were detained by apartheid's security police and all with the exception of one were murdered by the apartheid state.

=== Commemorated anti-Apartheid activists ===
- Neil Aggett
- Jeanette Curtis
- Imam Haron
- Elijah Loza
- Ashley Kriel
- Storey Luke Mazwembe
- Wilfred Rhodes
- Barry Streek

Their histories of struggle and sacrifice represent the histories of thousands of others who were detained, tortured and killed by the apartheid regime. That Community House continues to function as a site of activism, reinforcing its legacy, is in itself an act of remembering – promoting ideas that sustained the struggles of the past and reinforcing the memories of those who sacrificed their lives for liberation.

== Notable occupants ==
Civic society groups currently or previously located at Community House include:

- Congress of South African Trade Unions
- Human Rights Media Centre
- International Labour Research and Information Group
- Workers International Vanguard League
- Open Secrets
- Labour Research Service
- Institute for African Alternatives
- South African Domestic Service and Allied Workers Union
- South African Communist Party
- IFWEA

== Provincial Heritage Site ==
Community House was declared a provincial heritage site by Heritage Western Cape on 19 February 2010 in the terms of Section 27 of the National Heritage Resources Ac. This gives the site grade II status and provides the site with protection under South African Heritage law.
