= Isaac Schapera =

British social anthropologist (1905 – 2003)

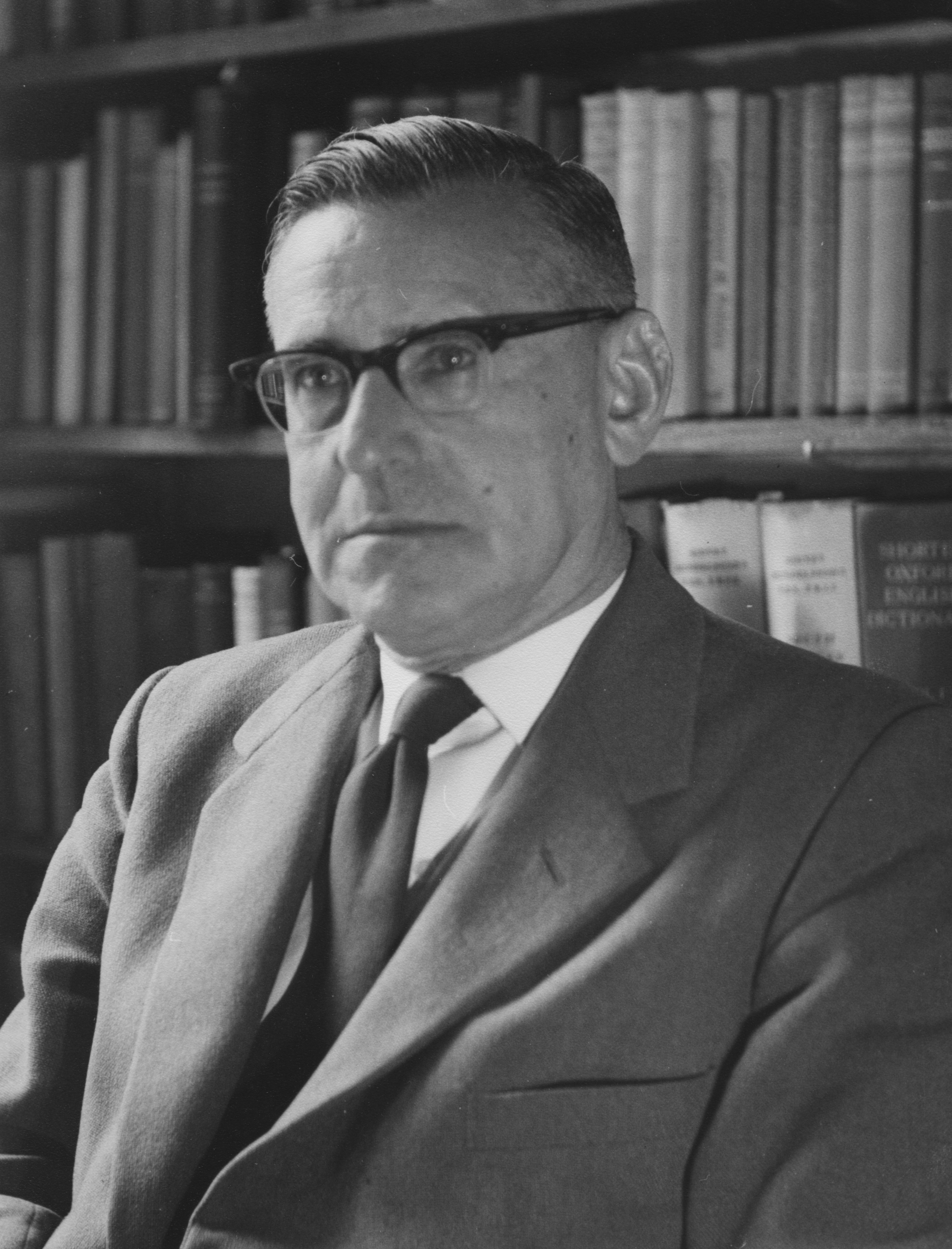
- Schapera in the 1950s
- Born: 23 June 1905; Garies, Cape Colony
- Died: 26 June 2003 (aged 98); London, England
- Education: University of Cape Town; London School of Economics
- Scientific career
- Fields: Social anthropologist
- Workplaces: London School of Economics
- Thesis: The tribal system in South Africa: a study of the Bushmen and the Hottentots (1929)

Isaac Schapera FBA FRAI (23 June 1905 Garies, Cape Colony – 26 June 2003 London, England) was a British social anthropologist at the London School of Economics specialising in South Africa. He was notable for his contributions of ethnographic and typological studies of the indigenous peoples of Botswana and South Africa. Additionally, he was one of the founders of the group that would develop British social anthropology.

Not only did Schapera write numerous publications of his extensive research done in South Africa and Botswana, he published his work throughout his career (1923–1969), and even after he retired. As an anthropologist he focused on the lives and customs of the indigenous peoples of South Africa and was considered to be a specialist in the topic. Early in his career he would focus on studies of the Khoisan of South Africa until the 1930s, when he would begin to focus on Tswana of Botswana.

Schapera also received many honours and titles, such as being the president of the Royal Anthropology Institute. Additionally, he was awarded an honorary doctorate when the University of Botswana was founded in 1985, was elected as Chair of the Association of Social Anthropology, and the Journal of African Law was founded in his honour.

To compile his work for future generations and note his anthropological contributions a bibliography was published in the Botswana Journal of African African Studies. This academic journal has also dedicated an entire issue to the work he had done throughout his career. In 2003 his obituary was published in the academic journal Anthropology Today, titled "The Legacy of Isaac Schapera". In the wake of his death, photographs he had taken of South Africa were published in a book Picturing a Colonial Past; The African Photographs by Isaac Schapera and the Recovering the Botswana project would be dedicated to him.

== Life, education, and career ==
Schapera was born in Garies, Namaqualand, South Africa where his father owned a general store. His parents were of Ashkenazi Jewish origin and had immigrated to South Africa during the Russian Revolution. In his youth he attended school, and later university, in Cape Town, South Africa. During his early university career he was enrolled in law, but would later switch to anthropology. He was a student of Alfred Reginald Radcliffe-Brown, who is considered a founder of structural-functionalism theory in anthropology. After finishing his Bachelor of Arts and Master of Arts in anthropology, Schapera completed his doctorate at the London School of Economics and Politics (LSE) where he would be influenced by Bronislaw Malinowski. His thesis was titled The tribal system in South Africa: a study of the Bushmen and the Hottentots. Thereafter he taught briefly at the University of Witwatersrand before returning to Cape Town. There he worked as a professor of social anthropology before joining the Department of Anthropology at LSE. His continued to work there until he retired in 1969.

Schapera's students would include future important figures of anthropology, such as Eileen Krige, Hilda Kuper, Max Gluckman, John Comaroff, Johan Frederik Holleman and Jean Comaroff. After his death, a research program called "Recovering the Schapera Project" was carried out by the University of Botswana to build upon Schapera's research. As a professor he was noted by Kuper as "not being an inspiring lecturer, but [having] wonderful material".

Schapera's life was his work, and he never married. In his later years, Schapera rarely returned to the place of his studies, but did return to Botswana to receive the honorary degree awarded to him by the University of Botswana. Additionally, because of damage to his vocal cords caused by surgery, he withdrew from socializing, though he maintained contact with students to stay up to date with ongoing anthropological studies.

== His legacy ==
"Recovering the Schapera Project" is the continuation of the extensive research made by Schapera of the people of Botswana. His style of recording and studying was applied to all aspects of life and thus resulted in a wealth of unpublished material. This material includes unpublished genealogies, history, and other culturally significant data. The Shapera Project is funded by the Faculty of Social Sciences at the University of Botswana for the university overtook assessing this data and building upon it after Schapera's death.

== Published material ==
He published numerous journal articles, nearly 200, as mentioned in the academic Journal of African Studies, which published a bibliography in 1998. Notable titles include: "The Khoisan Peoples of South Africa" (Schapera; 1930), "A Handbook of Tswana Law and Custom" (Schapera; 1938), "Married Life in an African Tribe" (Schapera; 1940), "The Ethnic Composition of Tswana Tribes" (Schapera; 1952); "The Tswana" (Schapera; 1953), "Government and Politics in Tribal Societies", (Schapera; 1956), "Praise Poems of Tswana Chiefs" (Schapera; 1965), "David Livingstone's Journals and Letters" (Schapera; 1841–1856 (6 vols), 1959–1963), "David Livingstone: South African papers" (Schapera; 1849–1853, 1974).

== Archives ==
- Catalogue of the papers of Isaac Schapera held at LSE Archives
- Catalogue of books from the library of Isaac Schapera, mainly on the subject of David Livingstone
