= Thomas Jesse Jones =

Thomas Jesse Jones (1873-1950) was a Welsh-American sociologist and educational administrator. He was Educational Director of the Phelps Stokes Fund from 1917 to 1946. W. E. B. DuBois accused Jones of systematically working to replace Black leaders with white and labelled Jones "that evil genius of the Negro race".

== Life ==
Thomas Jesse Jones was born on 4 August 1873 in Llanfachraeth, a village in Wales. His father was the village saddler, his grandfather the village blacksmith, and his mother was the local innkeeper. In 1884 the family emigrated to the United States, settling in Middleport, Ohio. Jones attended Washington and Lee University, and graduated from Marietta College, Columbia University and Union Theological Seminary. His Columbia PhD, under the direction of Franklin H. Giddings, looked at the Italian and Jewish communities in a city block in New York City.

From 1902 to 1909 Jones directed the research department at Hampton Institute. In 1906 he was appointed director of research and organizer of the Hampton Negro Conferences. From 1909 to 1912 he worked as a statistician at the US Bureau of the Census, where he organized data collection on blacks for the 1910 census. In 1913 he became an agent for the Phelps Stokes Fund. In 1916 he completed the first federal study of black schools, and in 1917 became educational director of the Phelps Stokes Fund.

In 1921, W. E. B. Du Bois critiqued Jones claiming that he had been systematically replacing black leaders in various organizations with white leaders. Du Bois noted Jones's activity in the Y.W.C.A., the Y.M.C.A., the Phelps-Stokes Fund, and even international missionary work like that of Max Yergan in South Africa. Du Bois wasn't sure how he came to this practice, but: "The point is that he did come to the place where he definitely and persistently began to work so as to displace Negro leaders, and gather into his own hands such an amount of information and power as would gradually give him the position of arbiter and patron of the Negro race in America." Du Bois was adamantly opposed: "we have no enmity against Mr. Jones and are not stopping to question his motives or purposes, as American Negroes, and as men, we propose to speak for ourselves and to be represented by spokesmen whom we elect; and whenever in any case this policy is contravened we are going to fight that decision in every civilized way, and to the last ditch."

== Works ==
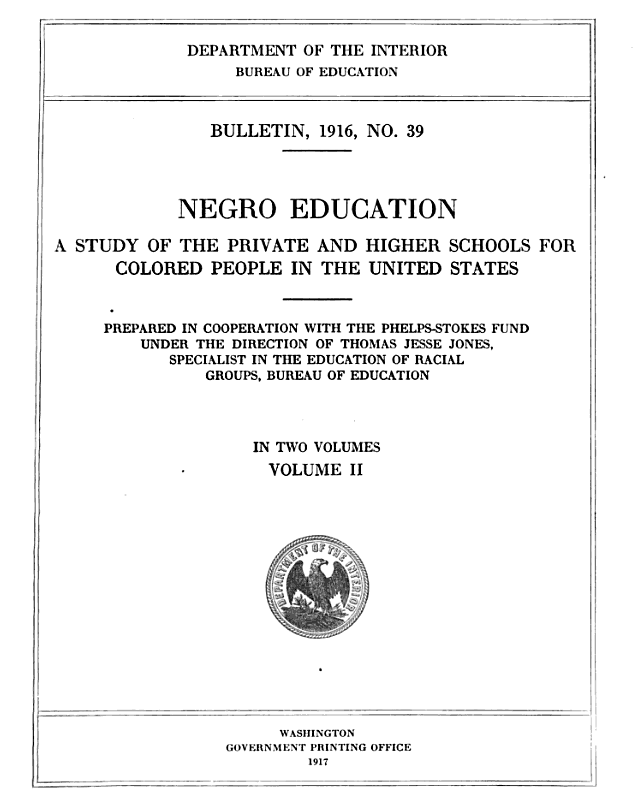

- The sociology of a New York city block. New York: Columbia University Press, 1904.
- Negro education: a study of the private and higher schools for colored people in the United States. 2 vols. Washington: Government printing office, 1916.
- Educational adaptations: report of ten years' work of the Phelps-Stokes Fund, 1910-1920. New York : Phelps-Stokes Fund, 1920.
- Education in Africa; a study of West, South, and equatorial Africa by the African education commission, under the auspices of the Phelps-Stokes fund and foreign mission societies of North America and Europe. New York, Phelps-Stokes Fund, 1922.
- Education in East Africa : a study of East, Central and South Africa by the Second African Education Commission under the auspices of the Phelps-Stokes Fund, in cooperation with the International Education Board. New York: Phelps-Stokes Fund; London: Edinburgh House Press, 1925.
- Four essentials of education. New York: Charles Scribner, 1926.
- Essentials of civilization: a study in social values. New York: H. Holt and Co., 1929.
- (with Charles T. Loram, Harold B. Allen and Ella Deloria) The Navajo Indian problem: an inquiry sponsored by the Phelps-Stokes Fund. New York, 1939.
