= Muriel Horrell =

South African researcher

Muriel Agatha Horrell (13 December 1910 – May 1994) was a South African pilot, military officer and race relations researcher. She served in the South African Women’s Auxiliary Air Force (WAAF) during the Second World War, attaining the rank of major and serving in South Africa, Kenya, Egypt and Italy. She was appointed a Member of the Order of the British Empire (MBE) in 1947 for her wartime service. After the war, Horrell worked for the South African Institute of Race Relations (IRR) for almost four decades, where she researched apartheid legislation and compiled the Institute's annual Survey of Race Relations, which became a widely used reference on South African social, political and economic conditions. She received honorary degrees from the University of Natal and the University of the Witwatersrand in recognition of her contributions to race relations research.

== Early life ==
Horrell was born on 13 December 1910 in Pretoria, South Africa, to Katherine (née Sutherns) and Lloyd Leslie Horrell, the eldest of five children. She attended Pretoria High School for Girls and then completed a Bachelor of Science at the University of the Witwatersrand, followed by a teacher’s diploma at the Johannesburg Teacher Training College. She taught for just over eight years in Pretoria and helped develop a geography syllabus as a member of a provincial committee. She was also an active Girl Guide leader serving as a District Captain, keen sports woman, and accomplished rider.

== WAAF and wartime service ==
Horrell developed an early passion for aviation and is reputed to have been the first South African woman granted an airline pilot’s licence qualifying as a Flight Officer in 1938. She was active in the South African Women’s Aviation Association (SAWAA) and was a flight officer and lecturer. At the outbreak of World War ll on 1 September 1939, Egerton-Bird, a prominent member of the (SAWAA) had telegraphed General Jan Smuts offering the SAWAA’s services to the government. On 10 May 1940, the establishment of the South African Women’s Auxiliary Air Force (WAAF) was gazetted, and Horrell was enlisted in 1940. The WAAF’s wartime activities included communications, intelligence, link-trainer instruction, armament training, and technical work on aircraft, in addition to clerical and logistical roles such as dispatch riding and administration.

In December 1940, Horrell led the first detachment of WAAFs to be sent north where they established a camp in Nairobi, Kenya. She was posted to Cairo in 1941 as deputy director of the WAAF in the Middle East.

In April 1942, the WAAF and South African Air Force (SAAF) administrative functions were merged, with only a few officers remaining in the directorate. With the El Alamein offensive toward Alexandria and Cairo in June 1942, Horrell oversaw the evacuation of around 800 WAAF personnel from Cairo to Aswan.

In December 1943, Horrell was appointed as WAAF Staff Officer responsible to Air Headquarters Services back in Pretoria with the rank of Major. When mobilisation began, she visited WAAF contingents in Algeria and Italy in 1945 as part of a demobilization team.

== Demobilisation and postwar work ==
After being demobilised on 15 May 1946, Horrell began working as a technical officer for the National War Memorial Health Foundation. The Foundation originated with a proposal to establish a living war memorial that provided health services to all South Africans, including non-European communities. Its guiding principles were that it be living, national, and support fundamental human rights. In this role, she helped to plan health promotion projects and travelled widely throughout the country.

On 14 November 1947, Horrell was appointed a Member of the Order of the British Empire (MBE) for her wartime service in recognition of her organisation and evacuation of WAAFs from Cairo during the El Alamein campaigns.

Following the election of the National Party (South Africa) in 1948 the government announced that the Foundation would receive no further grants other than those promised by the defeated Prime Minister, Jan Smuts. Due to dwindling funds, staff were advised to seek other employment, and Horrell accepted a post as Technical Assistant at the South African Institute of Race Relations (IRR).

The IRR, founded in 1929, is an organisation dedicated to researching socio-economic issues and improving race relations in South Africa. In a 1989 interview, Horrell stated: “I’ve always believed that one must be involved to effect change.”

In 1949, Horrell began at the IRR in the newly established role of technical assistant (renamed as research officer from 1959). One of Horrell’s first tasks at IRR was to document the effects of the Group Areas Act. Horrell travelled extensively across South Africa to observe the social and economic consequences of this legislation.

She took over compiling the annual Survey of Race Relations, and is named as initiating the change of the Survey to a report on the state of the nation and making the report essential to all students of South African Affairs. From 1959, this role was that of research officer which she executed alone until the last six years of her twenty-eight year service when she had assistance. The Survey of Race Relations is an annual publication documenting socio-economic, demographic, and political trends in South Africa, including politics, employment, industrial relations, education, health, living conditions, and crime. The Surveys were objective and rigorous with facts fully authenticated, referencing ministerial statements, official reports and parliamentary records. Horrell extended the IRR’s research and collection of factual information, producing 41 booklets and fact papers on topics such as the homelands, trade unions, passive and violent resistance, and the rights of black women. In addition to research, she prepared parliamentary questions, reported on legislation affecting race relations, met with local and international visitors, and gave lectures when invited.

In her 1994 obituary, John Kane-Berman, executive director of IRR, called her “the Queen of a Million Footnotes”, noting that “her name appears in more academic books and journal articles in more languages than any other person who has written about South Africa”. An editorial in the Cape Times in 1976 stated that in the Survey, “the facts speak for themselves, too often with spine-chilling eloquence, but their presentation is rigorous and objective.”

In 1964, she received a travel grant from the Carnegie Foundation to study underdeveloped communities in Africa and the United States. She visited Kenya, Northern Rhodesia, Rhodesia and Tanganyika, newly independent nations, examining the challenges and opportunities of postcolonial development. Her research included political, social and economic analysis of each African country she visited. In the United States, she researched Native American reservations and compared them with African reserves/homelands, and an in depth analysis of the Civil Rights movement. During her time in the United States, she embarked on a speaking tour, and attended many meetings with academics, senior human rights, political and church leaders as well as South African exiles.

== IRR and apartheid-era research ==
In 1971, Horrell was awarded an honorary Master of Social Science degree by the University of Natal, and in 1974, she received an honorary Doctor of Philosophy from the University of the Witwatersrand “for her contributions to the study and improvement of race relations in South Africa.”

In 1972, she was sponsored by the University of Gothenburg, the Scandinavian Institute of African Affairs (now called the Nordic Africa Institute) and the Swedish Mission Board to give a series of addresses in Sweden.

In 1973, the IRR was one of four anti-apartheid civil society organisations investigated by the Schlebusch Commission. The SAIRR Council stated that the Schlebusch Commission was a ‘totally unsuitable vehicle for a task of this nature’. They criticised the use of a select committee of Parliament, the in-camera nature of hearings, and the inability of affected entities to review the evidence against them.

== Later life and death ==
Horrell retired from full-time work at the Institute in 1977 but continued contributing chapters on religion to The Survey of Race Relations until her 80s. She remained active in improving race relations through the St John’s Ecumenical Church. Horrell died in May 1994 in Johannesburg, South Africa, aged 83.

== Selected publications ==
- Horrell, Muriel. An Outline of the Systems of Government and the Political Status of Non-European Peoples in Africa South of the Sahara (1953)
- Horrell, Muriel. Non-European Policies in the Union and the Measure of Their Success (1954)
- Horrell, Muriel. The Group Areas Act: Its Effect on Human Beings (1956)
- Horrell, Muriel. South Africa’s Non-White Workers (1956)
- Horrell, Muriel. Racialism and the Trade Unions (1959)
- Horrell, Muriel. Days of Crisis in South Africa: Events up to 15 May 1960 (1960)
- Horrell, Muriel. Group Areas: The Emerging Pattern with Illustrative Examples from Transvaal (1960)
- Horrell, Muriel. The “Pass Laws” (1960)
- Horrell, Muriel. The Liquor Laws as They Affect Africans and Coloured and Asian People (1960)
- Horrell, Muriel. South African Trade Unionism: A Study of a Divided Working Class (1961)
- Horrell, Muriel, assisted by Mary Draper. Facts and Figures about Non-White Labour (1963)
- Horrell, Muriel. African Education: Some Origins and Development until 1953 (1963)
- Horrell, Muriel. Legislation and Race Relations (1963; 1966)
- Horrell, Muriel. Action, Reaction and Counteraction: A Companion Booklet to “Legislation and Race Relations” (1963)
- Horrell, Muriel, assisted by Mary Draper. The New Look in the African Reserves (1963)
- Horrell, Muriel. A Decade of Bantu Education (1964)
- Horrell, Muriel. Study Tour (1964)
- Horrell, Muriel. Days of Crisis in Rhodesia (1965)
- Horrell, Muriel. Visit to Bantu Areas of the Northern Transvaal (1965)
- Horrell, Muriel. South-West Africa (1967)
- Horrell, Muriel. Bantu Education to 1968 (1968)
- Horrell, Muriel. Introduction to South Africa: Basic Facts and Figures (1968)
- Horrell, Muriel. South Africa and the Olympic Games (1968)
- Horrell, Muriel. Terrorism in Southern Africa (1968)
- Horrell, Muriel. The Rights of African Women: Some Suggested Reforms (1968; 1975)
- Horrell, Muriel. The African Reserves of South Africa (1969)
- Horrell, Muriel. Bantu School Education, 1955 to 1968: A Review and Assessment (1969)
- Horrell, Muriel. South Africa’s Workers: Their Organizations and the Patterns of Employment (Undated; 1969)
- Horrell, Muriel. South Africa: Basic Facts and Figures (1973)
- Horrell, Muriel. The African Homelands of South Africa (1973)
- Horrell, Muriel. A Brief Guide to Some Laws Affecting African Women (1975)
- Horrell, Muriel. Population of the Union of South Africa (Undated)
- Horrell, Muriel. Reserves and Reservations: A Comparison of Plans for the Advancement of Under-Developed Areas in South Africa and the United States (Undated)
- Horrell, Muriel. Systems of Government and Political Status of Non-Europeans in Southern Africa (Undated)
- Horrell, Muriel. The Education of the Coloured Community in South Africa 1652 to 1970 (Undated)
