= Alfred Hoernlé =

South African philosopher (1880–1943)

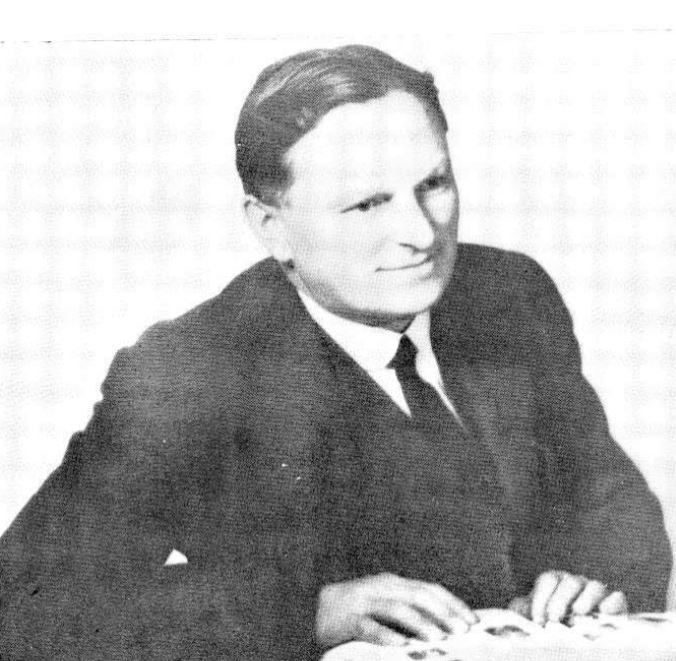
Hoernlé

Reinhold Friedrich Alfred Hoernlé (1880–1943), usually referred to as Alfred Hoernlé, was a South African philosopher and social reformer.

== Early life ==
Hoernlé was born in Bonn, Germany, and was the son of the Indologist A.F.R. Rudolf Hoernlé (1841–1918). His father was a missionary-scholar associated with the London Missionary Society and, therefore, Alfred was a British subject by birth.

Alfred spent his early years in India, but returned to Germany for his schooling. He studied at Balliol College, Oxford, receiving first class honours in literae humaniores (1903) and, later an M.A. (1907) and a B.Sc. (1907) from Oxford with a thesis on “Modern Theories of the Will.”

== Career ==
He served briefly as assistant to philosopher Bernard Bosanquet at the University of St Andrews, in Scotland, before being selected as Professor of Philosophy at the South African College in Cape Town (1908-11). After teaching at Armstrong College in Newcastle (England) and at Harvard University, he took up the Chair of Philosophy at the University of the Witwatersrand in Johannesburg, South Africa in 1923.

At Witwatersrand, Hoernlé lectured on Plato, Aristotle, logic, psychology, and ethics and political philosophy. Hoernlé published prolifically. In 1924 Hoernlé published one of his major philosophical texts, Idealism as a Philosophical Doctrine, that offered a survey of a number of the different idealist 'schools’, distinguishing the idealism of Berkeley, for example, from that of Hegel. In addition to his philosophical work, he was the author of many articles and several books engaging contemporary social and political debates, such as Race and Reason and South African Native Policy and the Liberal Spirit.

He died in Johannesburg in 1943.

== Philosophy ==
Hoernlé was strongly influenced by British idealism - particularly J.A. Smith, Edward Caird, and Bernard Bosanquet. He (along with his wife, Agnes Winifred Hoernlé) were active in the movement for racial justice in South Africa, but both were eminent scholars in their own right. Alfred believed that both practical and philosophical issues could be addressed through the kind of idealism - sometimes later called ‘speculative philosophy’ - represented by Bosanquet.

Hoernlé had a close interest in practical affairs, and early became concerned with the situation of the native populations in South Africa and the impact of Western culture on them. He was regarded as a major figure of the liberal movement in South Africa, and is referred to, with great respect, in Alan Paton’s famous novel Cry the Beloved Country.

== Selected publications ==
- Hoernlé, R.F.A. (1920) Studies in Contemporary Metaphysics, New York: Harcourt, Brace & London: Kegan Paul, Trench, Trubner.
- (1923) Matter, Life, Mind, and God. Five lectures on contemporary tendencies in thought, London: Methuen & New York: Harcourt, Brace.
- (1924) Idealism as a Philosophical Doctrine, London: Hodder & Stoughton.
- (1925) ‘On the Way to a Synoptic Philosophy’, Contemporary British Philosophy, personal statements (first series), ed. J. H. Muirhead, London, New York: G. Allen and Unwin, Macmillian Co. pp. 129-56.
- (1939) South African Native Policy and the Liberal Spirit. Being the Phelps-Stokes Lectures delivered before the University of Cape Town, Capetown: University of Cape Town, repr. Johannesburg: Witwatersrand University Press 1945.
- (1945) Race and reason; being mainly a selection of contributions to the race problem in South Africa. Edited with a memoir by I.D. Macrone, Johannesburg: Witwatersrand University Press.
- (1952) Studies in Philosophy, Edited with a memoir by Daniel S. Robinson, London: Allen & Unwin.
