= Catherine James Catti =

Visual artist (1940–2009)

- Born: October 8, 1940
- Died: November 7, 2009 (aged 69)

Catherine James Catti (October 8, 1940 - November 7, 2009) was an African American visual artist. She is best known for her paintings, which explore themes of identity, memory, and emotion. Catti’s work is also expressed through mixed media and costume.

== Early life and education ==
Catherine James Catti was born in Mt. Vernon, NY. She grew up surrounded by art and was encouraged to explore her creativity from a young age. Catti attended A.B. Davis High School, Boston University for her B.F.A in 1962, Hunter College Graduate Division in 1967, Columbia University for her M.A. in 1968, The New School for Social Research.

Catti grew up in an integrated neighborhood. Her father was from Bermuda and her mother was from Ireland. She learned how to work with wood in the basement of her childhood home in her father's workshop. She grew up with the encouragement of her parents who took her to museums to see the achievements of people of color. Her multiracial and multicultural background inspired her works.

== Career ==
Catti started off as a painter, and then incorporated other forms into her work. Making costumes interested her because she was able to design for movement. Early on most of the costumes were made for Charles Moore. James primary medium is mixed media constructions. Catti taught at City College, teaching three-dimensional design and art education courses. Growing up Catti designed costumes for theatre productions. Costume and design would later inspire her work. In 1965, James traveled to Africa with her ex-husband who was a bassist for Harry Belafonte. James worked as Belafonte's theatrical designer. James toured with Belafonte around the United States and to Guinea and West Africa.

In 1992 she co-curated with Marian Straw the exhibition, Words and Images featuring 23 contemporary Black artists.

== Awards and recognition ==
Catherine James Catti's work has been exhibited at the Museum of Modern Art, The Whitney Museum of American Art, and MoMA PS1 "The Wild Art Show", Catti was included in the Whitney Biennial, 1972 Annual Exhibition: Contemporary American Painting, and the 1986 group show Progressions: Cultural Legacy at MoMA PS1, along with 28 other artists.

== Collections ==
Her work is in the permanent collection of the State Government of New York, the Indianapolis Museum of Art, and the Studio Museum in Harlem, her work titled "Sister-Ship'' (1983).
