= William Etty =

English painter (1787–1849)

William Etty RA
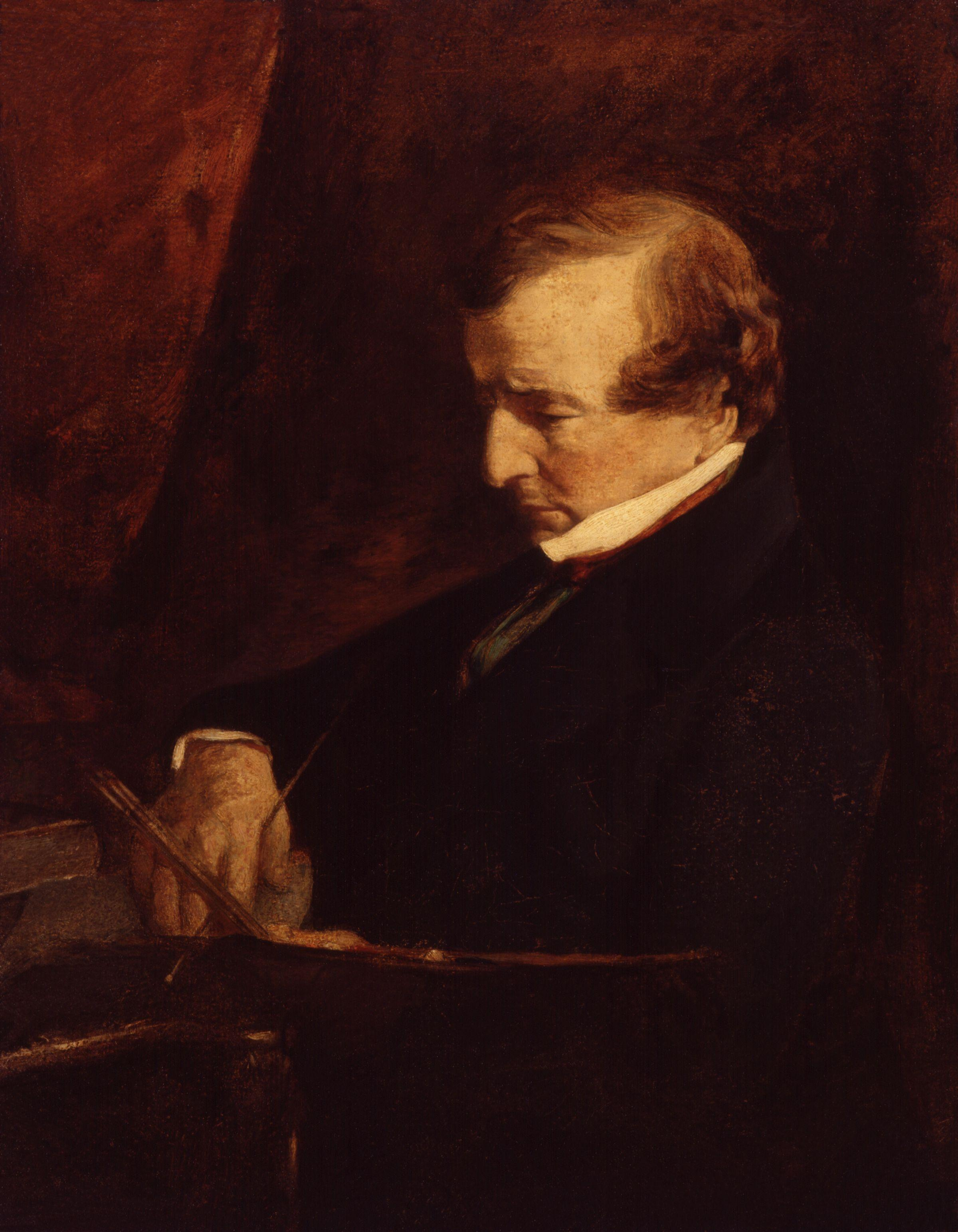
- 1845–1849 self-portrait based on an October 1844 photograph by Hill & Adamson
- Born: 10 March 1787; York, England
- Died: 13 November 1849 (aged 62); York, England
- Resting place: St Olave's Church, York, England
- Education: Thomas Lawrence
- Alma mater: Royal Academy Schools
- Known for: Painting
- Notable work: The Triumph of Cleopatra (1821); The Combat: Woman Pleading for the Vanquished (1825); Youth on the Prow, and Pleasure at the Helm (1832); The Sirens and Ulysses (1837); Musidora: The Bather 'At the Doubtful Breeze Alarmed' (1843)
- Style: English school of painting
- Elected: Royal Academician

William Etty RA (10 March 1787 – 13 November 1849) was an English artist best known for his historical paintings containing nude figures. He was the first significant British painter of nudes and still lifes. Born in York, he left school at the age of 12 to become an apprentice printer in Hull. He completed his apprenticeship seven years later and moved to London, where in 1807 he joined the Royal Academy Schools. There he studied under Thomas Lawrence and trained by copying works by other artists. Etty earned respect at the Royal Academy of Arts for his ability to paint realistic flesh tones, but had little commercial or critical success in his first few years in London.

Etty's Cleopatra's Arrival in Cilicia, painted in 1821, featured numerous nudes and was exhibited to great acclaim. Its success prompted several further depictions of historical scenes with nudes. All but one of the works he exhibited at the Royal Academy in the 1820s contained at least one nude figure, and he acquired a reputation for indecency. Despite this, he was commercially successful and critically acclaimed, and in 1828 was elected a Royal Academician, at the time the highest honour available to an artist. Although he was one of the most respected artists in the country he continued to study at life classes throughout his life, a practice considered inappropriate by his fellow artists. In the 1830s Etty began to branch out into the more lucrative but less respected field of portraiture, and later became the first English painter to paint significant still lifes. He continued to paint both male and female nudes, which caused severe criticism and condemnation from some elements of the press.

An extremely shy man, Etty rarely socialised and never married. From 1824 until his death he lived with his niece Betsy (Elizabeth Etty). Even in London he retained a keen interest in his native York, and was instrumental in the establishment of the town's first art school and the campaign to preserve York city walls. While he never formally converted from his Methodist faith, he was deeply attached to the Catholic Church and was one of the few non-Catholics to attend the 1838 opening of Augustus Pugin's chapel for St Mary's College, Oscott, at that time England's most important Catholic building.

Etty was prolific and commercially successful throughout the 1840s, but the quality of his work deteriorated throughout this period. As his health progressively worsened he retired to York in 1848. He died in 1849, shortly after a major retrospective exhibition. In the immediate aftermath of his death his works became highly collectable and sold for large sums. Changing tastes meant his work later fell out of fashion, and imitators soon abandoned his style. By the end of the 19th century the value of all of his works had fallen below their original prices, and outside his native York he remained little known throughout the 20th century. Etty's inclusion in Tate Britain's landmark Exposed: The Victorian Nude exhibition in 2001–02, the high-profile restoration of his The Sirens and Ulysses in 2010 and a major retrospective of his work at the York Art Gallery in 2011–12 led to renewed interest in his work.

== Background ==
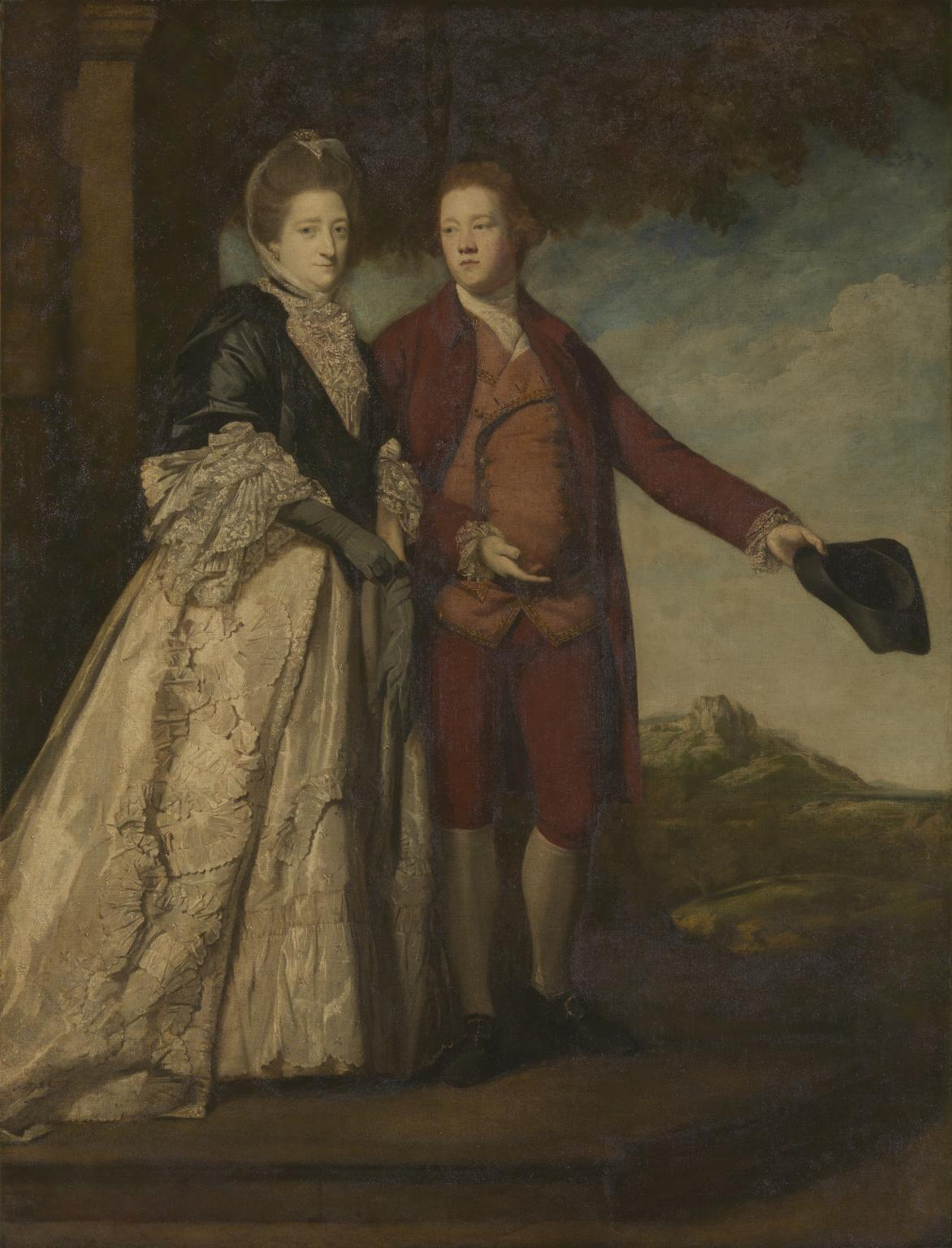
Sir Watkin Williams-Wynn and his mother Frances Shackerley, Joshua Reynolds, c. 1768–69. By the early 19th century Reynolds's style dominated British art.

In the late 18th and early 19th centuries, British painting was strongly influenced by Joshua Reynolds (1723–1792), the first president of the Royal Academy of Arts (RA). Reynolds believed the purpose of art was "to conceive and represent their subjects in a poetical manner, not confined to mere matter of fact", and that artists should emulate Renaissance painters such as Rubens, Paolo Veronese and Raphael and make their subjects close to perfection. After Reynolds's death his Discourses on Art, which extolled the notion of an artist's duty to paint idealised subjects, remained Britain's primary theoretical work on art. The Royal Academy dominated British art, with the annual Royal Academy Summer Exhibition the most important event in the calendar. The Royal Academy also controlled the prestigious Royal Academy art schools, which had an effective monopoly on the training of new artists and which taught with a very narrow focus on approved techniques. While painters such as J. M. W. Turner (a strong supporter of the Royal Academy) were beginning to move away from the influence of the Old Masters to create uniquely British styles, they adhered to principles established by Reynolds.

In the opinions then current at the Royal Academy and among critics, the most prestigious form of painting was considered history painting, in which an artwork illustrated a story. It was thought that such works enabled British artists to show themselves as equal or even superior to those European artists active at the time, as well as to the Old Masters. Other forms of painting such as portraiture and landscapes were considered lesser styles, as they did not give the artist as much opportunity to illustrate a story but instead were simply depictions of reality. Nonetheless, even the most eminent artists would often devote time to portrait painting, as portraits were generally commissioned by the subjects or their families, providing a guaranteed source of income to the artist; two of the first three presidents of the Royal Academy (Joshua Reynolds and Sir Thomas Lawrence) had made their names as portrait painters. (Note: Excluding architect James Wyatt, who was briefly elected to replace Benjamin West in 1805 but whose election was never formally approved, and who resigned in favour of West in 1806.) Owing to a lack of patrons willing to commission history paintings, by the early 19th century history painting in England was in serious decline.

== Childhood and apprenticeship (1787–1805) ==
I counted the years, days, weeks, and hours, till liberty should break my chains and set my struggling spirit free! That hour, that golden hour of 12, on the 23rd of October, 1805, I watched on the dial-plate of Hull High Church, and felt such a throb of delight as for seven long years I had been a stranger to! I was now entirely emancipated from servitude and slavery; I was flapping my young wings in the triumphant feeling of liberty! Not the liberty of licentiousness and jacobinism, but natural rational freedom of body, mind and will, to which for seven long years I had been an entire stranger! [...] Seven long years I patiently bided my time, but the iron went into my soul.

— William Etty on the 1805 completion of his apprenticeship, in his Autobiography written November 1848

William Etty was born in Feasegate, York, on 10 March 1787, the seventh child of Matthew and Esther Etty, née Calverley. Although Matthew Etty was a successful miller and baker, (Note: Matthew Etty was particularly noted in York for the quality of his gingerbread.) he bore a large family and was never financially secure. Esther Calverley's brother unexpectedly inherited the title of Squire of Hayton in 1745, nine years before Esther's birth, but disowned her following her marriage to Matthew, whom he considered as beneath her station. The family were strict Methodists and William was raised as such, although he disliked the spartan appearance of the Methodist chapel and liked to attend his Anglican parish church or York Minster when able.

He showed artistic promise from an early age, drawing in chalk on the wooden floor of his father's shop. From the age of four he attended local schools in York, before being sent at the age of 10 to Mr. Hall's Academy, a boarding school in nearby Pocklington, which he left two years later. On 8 October 1798, at the age of 11, William was apprenticed as a printer to Robert Peck of Hull, publisher of the Hull Packet. (Note: Robert Peck had recently married the daughter of one of the Ettys' neighbours.) While Etty found the work exhausting and unpleasant, he continued to draw in his spare time, and his job gave him the opportunity to broaden his education by reading books. It seems likely that it was working as a printer that led him to realise for the first time that it was possible for someone to make a living drawing and painting.

On 23 October 1805, Etty's seven-year indenture with Peck expired, an event greeted with great happiness as he intensely disliked the job. He remained in Hull for a further three weeks as a journeyman printer. He moved to London "with a few pieces of chalk-crayons in colours", to stay with his older brother Walter in Lombard Street. Walter worked for the successful gold lace manufacturer Bodley, Etty and Bodley, with whom their father's brother, also named William, was partner. He arrived in London on 23 November 1805, with the intention of gaining admission to the Royal Academy Schools.

== Training (1806–1821) ==
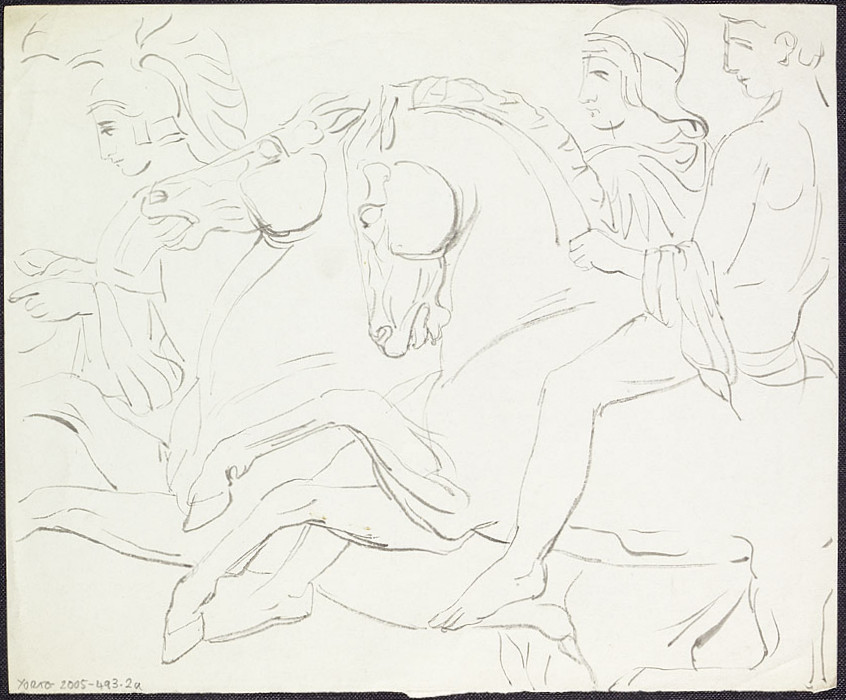
Sketches from the Elgin Marbles by William Etty. Aspiring students were expected to draw from classical sculptures as part of the admission process.

Applicants to the Royal Academy Schools were expected to pass stringent ability tests, and on his arrival in London Etty set about practising, drawing "from prints and from nature". Aware that all successful applicants were expected to produce high quality drawings of classical sculptures, he spent much time "in a plaster-cast shop, kept by Gianelli, in that lane near to Smithfield, immortalised by Dr. Johnson's visit to see 'The Ghost' there", (Note: The "lane near to Smithfield, immortalised by Dr. Johnson's visit to see 'The Ghost' there" was Cock Lane, near the northern edge of the City of London; the Cock Lane ghost was a notorious hoax of 1762, which was investigated by a committee including Samuel Johnson. J. B. Gianelli of 33 Cock Lane is listed as a Plaster of Paris manufacturer in contemporary directories.) which he described as "My first academy".

Etty obtained a letter of introduction from Member of Parliament Richard Sharp to painter John Opie. He visited Opie with this letter, and showed him a drawing he had done from a cast of Cupid and Psyche. Impressed, Opie recommended Etty to Henry Fuseli, who accepted him into the Royal Academy Schools as a probationer. Having satisfactorily completed drawings from casts of Laocoön and "the Torso of Michelangelo", (Note: It is uncertain to what "the Torso of Michelangelo" refers. Dennis Farr's 1958 biography of Etty speculates that it was the Belvedere Torso, which served as the model for some of Michelangelo's figures in the Sistine Chapel.) Etty was accepted as a full student on 15 January 1807.

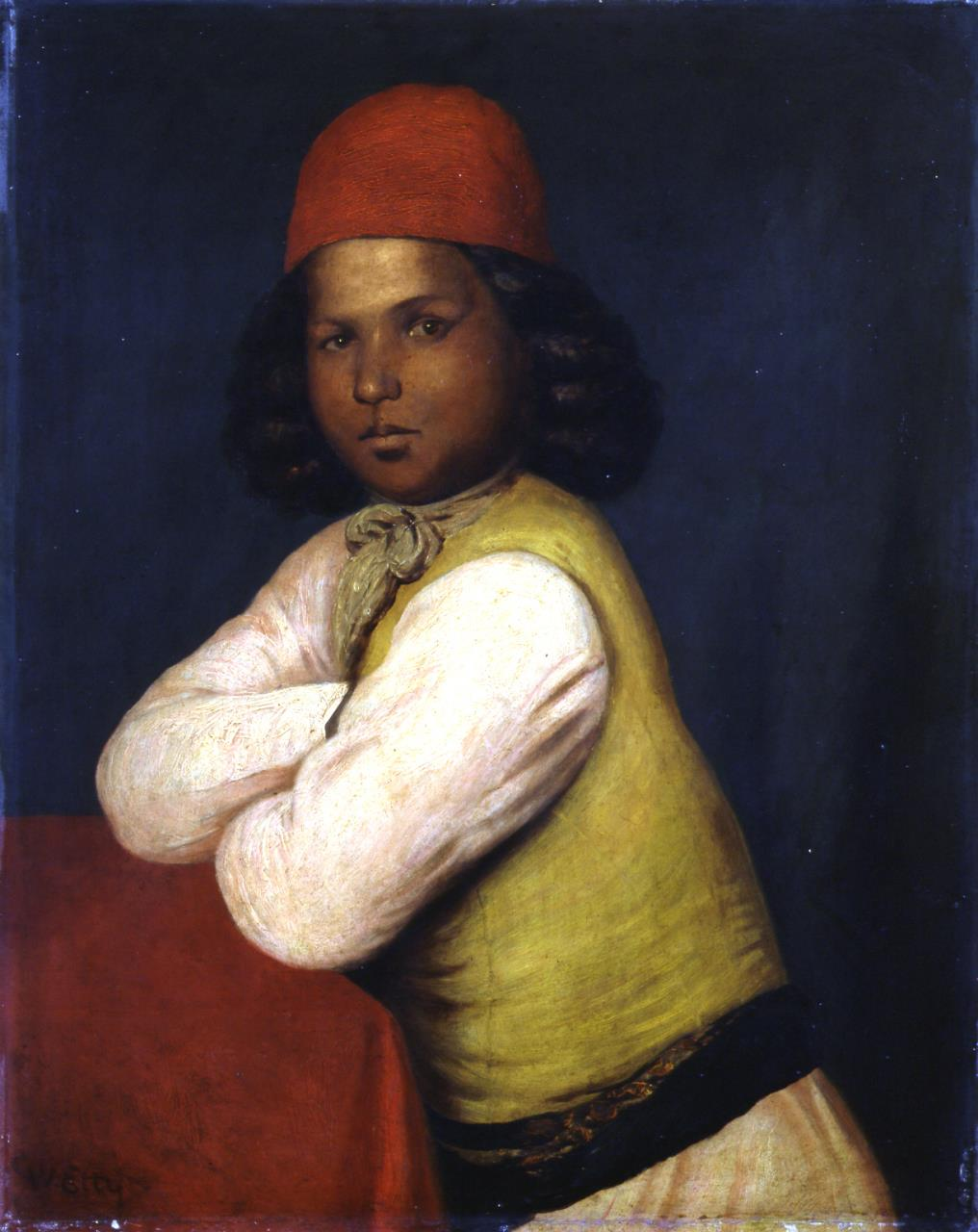
The Missionary Boy (1805–06) is thought to be Etty's oldest significant surviving painting. (Note: The attribution of The Missionary Boy to Etty is unconfirmed, and it was possibly painted c. 1820 by Etty's then assistant George Franklin. A damaged inscription on the back reads "I well remember [...] missionary boy at Hull painted York by W. Etty R.A.". No record of a dark-skinned child preacher appears in contemporary newspaper reports, and the picture possibly depicts a child convert educated by missionaries. The painting is signed "W. Etty" in the lower left corner, but the signature may not be authentic; no other Etty painting is signed on the front.)

Shortly after Etty joined the RA, four major lectures on painting were delivered by John Opie in February and March 1807. In them, Opie said that painting "brings into view the heroes, sages, and beauties of the earliest periods, the inhabitants of the most distant regions, and fixes and perpetuates the forms of the present day; it presents to us the heroic deeds, the remarkable events, and the interesting examples of piety, patriotism and humanity of all ages; and according to the nature of the action depicted, fills us with innocent pleasure, excites our abhorrence of crimes, moves us to piety, or inspires us with elevated sentiments". Opie rejected Reynolds's tradition of idealising the subjects of paintings, observing that he did not believe "that the flesh of heroes is less like flesh than that of other men". Opie advised his students to pay great attention to Titian, whose use of colour he considered unsurpassed, advising students that "colouring is the sunshine of the art, that clothes poverty in smiles [...] and doubles the charms of beauty. Opie's opinions made a deep impression on the young Etty, and he would hold these views throughout his career.

=== Thomas Lawrence ===
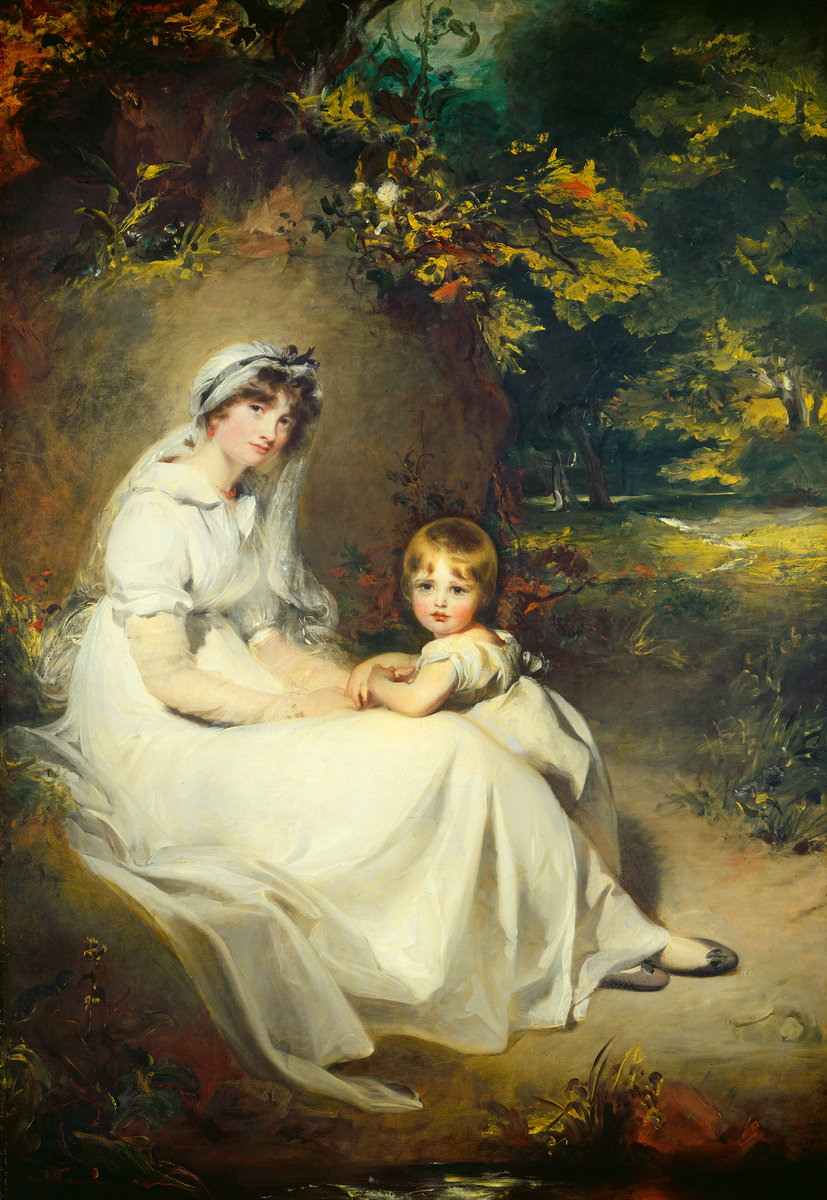
Lady Mary Templetown and Her Eldest Son, Thomas Lawrence, 1802

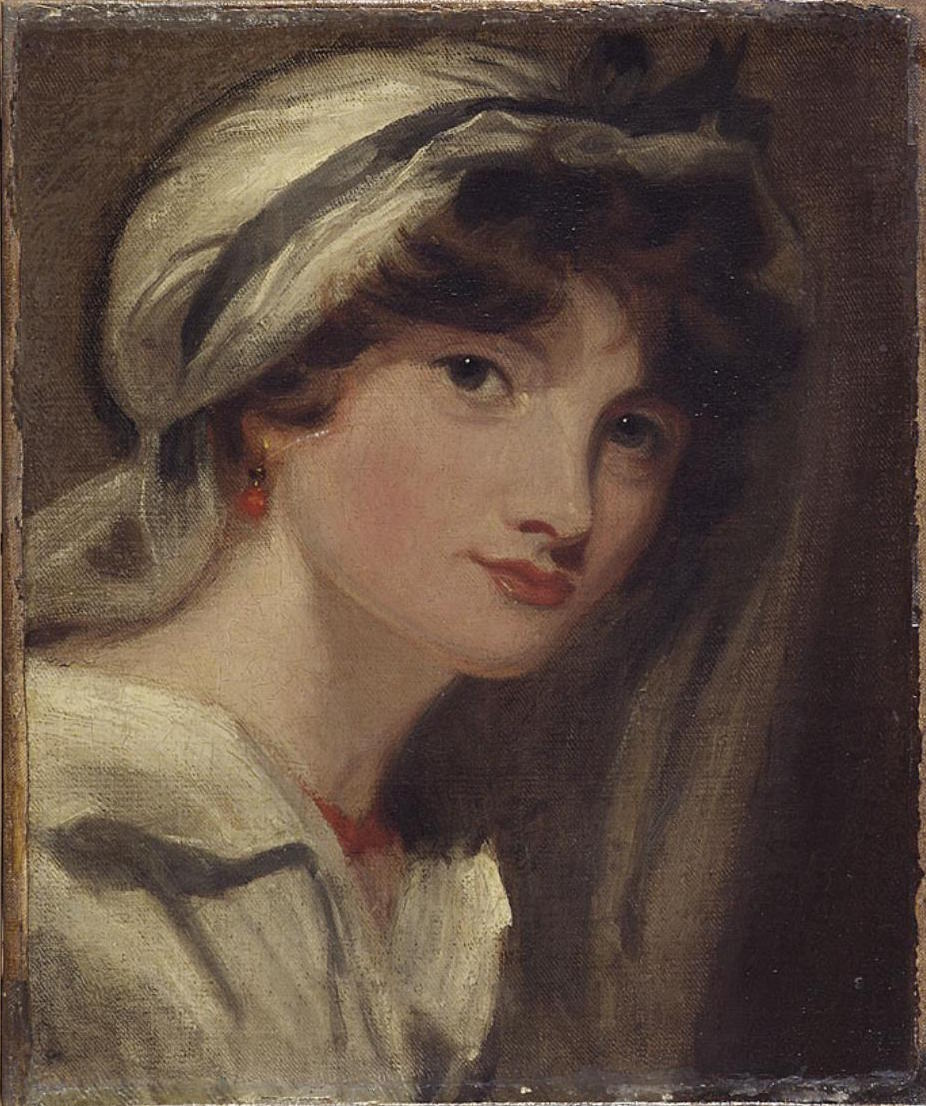
Mary, Lady Templeton [sic], after Thomas Lawrence, William Etty, 1807–08

By the time Etty painted Mary, Lady Templeton the original would no longer have been in Lawrence's possession; he almost certainly copied from one of Lawrence's preliminary sketches.

By this time, Etty had developed a great admiration for the portrait painter Thomas Lawrence, and hoped to learn from him. Having arranged an introduction via Henry Fuseli, Etty's uncle William met with Lawrence and paid him 100 guineas (about £8,300 in 2025 terms) in return for his accepting the younger William as a private pupil for a year.

Under this arrangement Etty did not receive formal tuition from Lawrence. Instead, Lawrence set aside a room in his attic for Etty to copy from his pictures, and agreed to answer questions when he was in a position to do so. Etty found the experience of copying Lawrence's work extremely frustrating, and in his own words "was ready to run away", but he persisted and eventually taught himself to copy Lawrence's work very closely. Although Etty found his year with Lawrence a frustrating experience, his development of the ability to copy other works served him in good stead in future when he came to copy elements from the Old Masters.

Once he had completed his year with Lawrence, Etty returned to the Royal Academy, drawing at the life class and copying other paintings, as well as undertaking commissions and doing occasional work for Lawrence to earn money. He was unsuccessful in all the Academy's competitions, and every painting he submitted for the Summer Exhibition was rejected.

In 1809 Etty's uncle William, with whom he had been staying, died. He was forced into an inconvenient transient lifestyle, moving from lodging to lodging. Etty had been left a significant sum in his uncle's will, and his brother Walter now took over their uncle's position at Bodley, Etty and Bodley, giving Walter the means to support the younger William's work financially. In 1811 Etty's persistence paid off. Two of his paintings were accepted for the Telemachus Rescues Antiope from the Fury of the Wild Boar exhibition at the Royal Academy Summer Exhibition, and Sappho at the British Institution. The latter sold for the respectable sum of 25 guineas (about £1,700 in 2025 terms). (Note: As is the case with almost all Etty's paintings prior to 1819 other than private portraits painted for friends and family—and with every painting exhibited by Etty at the Royal Academy between 1811 and 1818—neither Sappho nor Telemachus Rescues Antiope has survived.) Although from now on Etty had at least one work accepted for the Summer Exhibition each year, he had little commercial success and generated little interest over the next few years. By 1814, Etty was becoming widely respected at the RA for his use of colour and in particular his ability to produce realistic flesh tones.

=== France and Italy ===
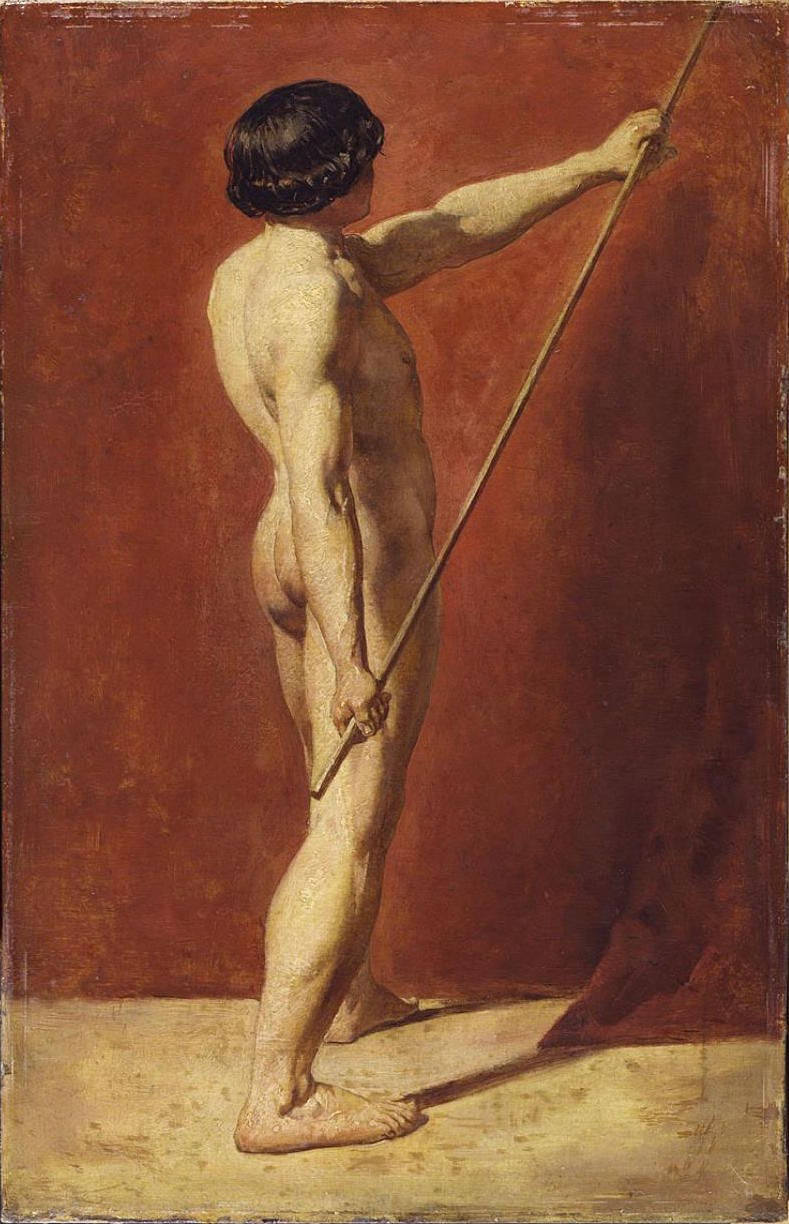
Male Nude with Staff (1814–16). Although a commercial failure in the 1810s, Etty was greatly respected at the RA for his ability to paint realistic flesh tones.

At the time, there were no public art galleries in England with permanent collections. (Note: England's first art gallery was the Dulwich Picture Gallery, opened to the public in 1817. Royal Academy students were permitted to visit the collection from 1815 onwards. Dulwich had no significant works of the Venetian school which Etty so admired.) In 1816, in the face of his continued lack of success, Etty decided to spend a year in Italy to study the artworks held in the great Italian collections. He had made a brief visit to France in early 1815, but other than this had never been abroad. (Note: Little is known of Etty's 1815 visit to France, other than that he arrived in Calais on 3 January 1815. Tourist travel to Continental Europe had become practical for British citizens for the first time in over a decade following Napoleon's surrender on 1 May 1814; Paris at this time was Europe's main artistic centre as the artworks looted by Napoleon's armies had yet to be returned. The war resumed following Napoleon's escape from Elba on 1 March 1815, and if Etty had not returned before then he would have left for England as soon as he heard the news.) The 28-year-old Etty had fallen in love, (Note: The woman's name is not recorded. Etty had difficulties forming relationships with women throughout his life.) and fretted about the difficulties a potential marriage would cause, and whether it would be right to travel to further his career even though it would mean taking his new wife to a foreign country. In the event, the woman rejected him, and he set out for the Continent in early September 1816.

Etty landed in Dieppe, and made his way to Paris via Rouen. Although he admitted to finding France a beautiful country, he was unhappy throughout his stay there, suffering from severe homesickness; shortly after his arrival in Paris he wrote to his cousin Martha Bodley that "I hope I shall like Italy better than Paris, or I think I shall not feel resolution to stop a year. If I don't, I shall content myself with seeing what I think worth while; and then return." He travelled onwards via Geneva, but found Switzerland frustrating; although he had brought his own tea-making equipment with him, in the remoter mountain villages he found it difficult to obtain milk for his tea. Travelling through the Simplon Pass to Piedmont revived his spirits somewhat; he found the variety of colour in the landscapes of northern Italy fascinating, and in late September arrived in Florence.

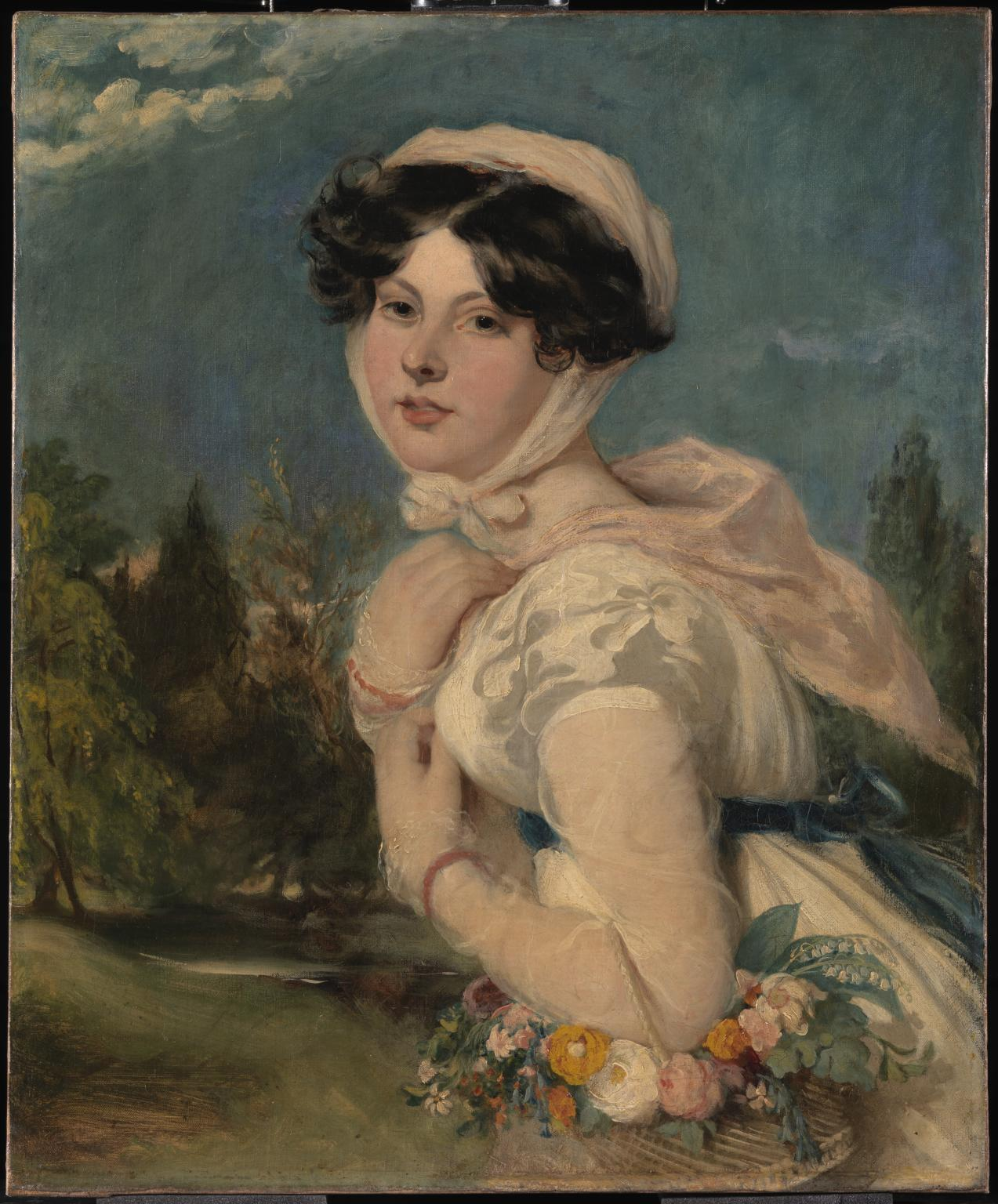
Miss Mary Arabella Jay (1819), one of the earliest paintings exhibited by Etty at the Summer Exhibition to survive. Etty's style at this time was still heavily influenced by Lawrence.

Despite the grandeur of Florence, Etty was severely depressed, writing to his brother on 5 October that "I feel so lonely, it is impossible for me to be happy" and complaining of "the vermin in the bed, the dirt and the filth" which he considered "such as no Englishman can have any idea of, who has not witnessed it". His emotional state made it impossible for him to study, and within a month of his arrival in Italy, he began the journey back to England, stopping in Paris on 26 October 1816. There he enrolled in the atelier of Jean-Baptiste Regnault but found the atmosphere rowdy and the studio too full of Frenchmen, and he left after a week. While in Paris he also attended the Académie des Beaux-Arts, and amassed a large quantity of prints from the art shops of Paris. Still homesick, Etty left Paris, returning to London in November.

Notwithstanding his unhappiness, Etty appears to have developed as a painter during his travels. For the first time, his two paintings exhibited at the 1817 Summer Exhibition (Bacchanalians: a Sketch and Cupid and Euphrosyne) attracted a favourable review in the press, in this case from William Paulet Carey writing in the Literary Gazette who considered Bacchanalians "a fine classical invention" and Cupid as showing "splendid promise". Carey was later to take great pride in being the first critic to recognise Etty's potential, and continued to champion him throughout his career. In 1818 Etty entered a copy of Damiano Mazza's The Rape of Ganymede—at the time thought to be by Titian—in one of the Royal Academy's painting competitions. Easily the most accomplished entry in the competition, Etty was due to win until two of the other contestants complained that he had technically breached RA rules by briefly removing the painting from Academy premises to work on it at home; they further complained that Etty was technically a professional artist and thus ineligible for the contest despite his still being a student. Etty was disqualified from the competition, but the high quality of his work further raised his prestige within the Academy. Although his income was still low and he was surviving on gifts from his brother, at some point by 1818 Etty hired an assistant, George Henry Franklin. (Note: Very little is documented about Franklin other than passing mentions in Etty's correspondence. He is known to have been a painter in his own right, albeit an unsuccessful one, who exhibited at least one painting at the Royal Academy. Etty is only known to have had one formal pupil, James Mathews Leigh in 1828–29.)

==== The Coral Finder ====
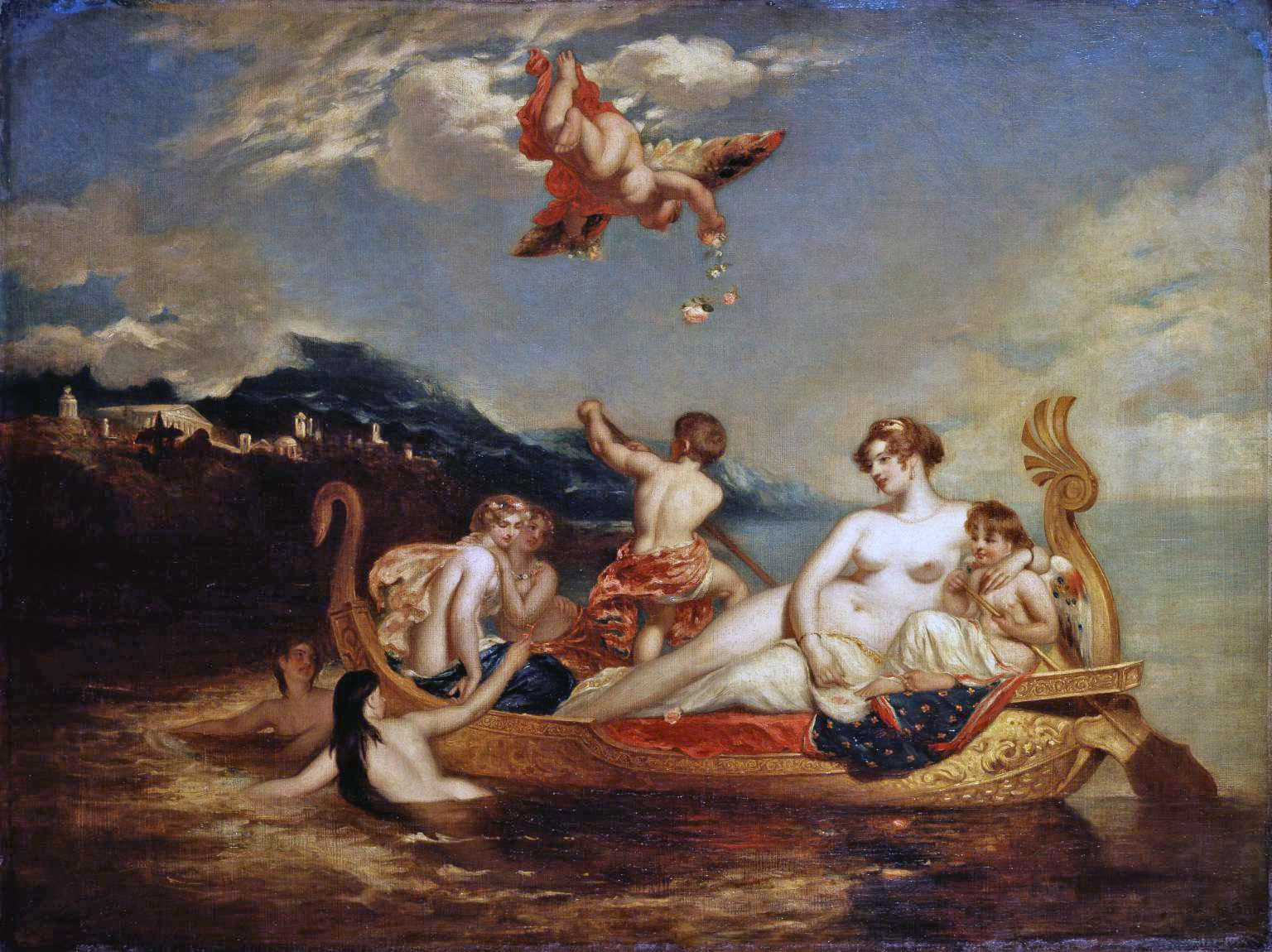
The Coral Finder (1820)

At the 1820 Summer Exhibition, Etty exhibited two paintings: Drunken Barnaby and The Coral Finder: Venus and her Youthful Satellites Arriving at the Isle of Paphos. Drunken Barnaby is a scene of a drunken man being carried away from an inn while a barmaid looks on; the barmaid is shown as sturdily built, plump and rosy-cheeked, a style in which Etty continued to paint women throughout his career. The Coral Finder is strongly inspired by Titian, and depicts Venus Victrix lying nude in a golden boat, surrounded by scantily clad attendants. It was Etty's first use of the combination of nude figures and mythological or literary references for which he was to become famous.

The Coral Finder was sold at exhibition to piano manufacturer Thomas Tomkinson for £30 (about £2,500 in 2025 terms). Sir Francis Freeling had admired The Coral Finder at its exhibition, and on learning that it had already been sold he commissioned Etty to paint a similar picture on a more ambitious scale, for a fee of 200 guineas (about £17,500 in 2025 terms). Etty had for some time been musing on the possibility of a painting of Cleopatra, and took the opportunity provided by Freeling to paint a picture of her based loosely on the composition of The Coral Finder.

== Recognition and travels (1821–1823) ==
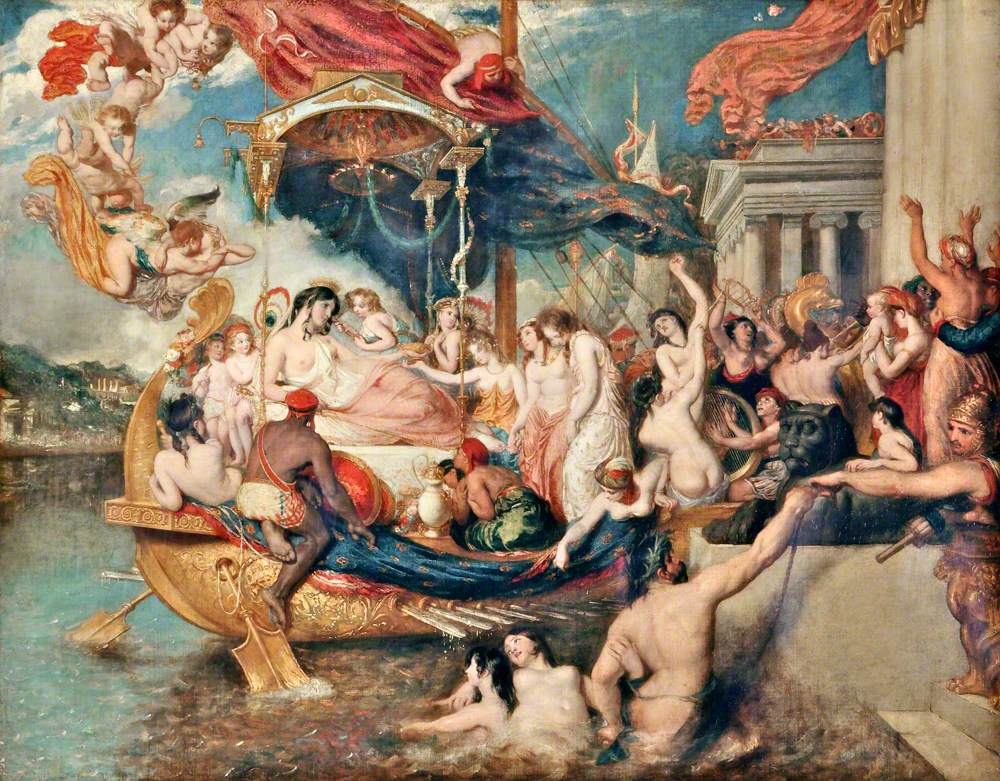
Cleopatra's Arrival in Cilicia (1821)

Cleopatra's Arrival in Cilicia (also known as The Triumph of Cleopatra) is based loosely on Plutarch's Life of Antony and Shakespeare's Antony and Cleopatra, in which the Queen of Egypt travels to Tarsus in Cilicia aboard a grand ship to cement an alliance with the Roman general Mark Antony. While superficially similar to The Coral Finder, Cleopatra is more closely related to the style of Regnault, with its intentionally cramped and crowded composition. The individual figures are out of proportion to each other and the ship, while many figures are tightly positioned within a small section of the painting. As well as from Regnault, the work borrows elements from Titian, Rubens and classical sculpture.

When exhibited in 1821, Cleopatra was generally extremely well received, and considered among the finest paintings of its kind, and its success inspired Etty to paint more works in a similar vein. The exhibition of Cleopatra, coupled with the exhibition in January 1822 of A Sketch from One of Gray's Odes (Youth on the Prow) which also depicted nude figures on a boat, (Note: A Sketch from One of Gray's Odes (Youth on the Prow) was an early sketch on a theme which a decade later provided one of Etty's most significant paintings, 1832's Youth on the Prow, and Pleasure at the Helm.) drew criticism of Etty for his treatment of female nudes. The Times in early 1822 chided Etty, remarking that "We take this opportunity of advising Mr. Etty, who got some reputation for painting "Cleopatra's Galley", not to be seduced into a style which can gratify only the most vicious taste. Naked figures, when painted with the purity of Raphael, may be endured: but nakedness without purity is offensive and indecent, and on Mr. Etty's canvass is mere dirty flesh." Unlike nude studies by other artists of the period, Etty made no attempt to idealise the female nudes in Cleopatra, but instead painted them in realistic poses and realistic flesh tones. Possibly alarmed by the criticism, Freeling persuaded Etty to paint clothes onto some of the figures in Cleopatra, although in 1829 he allowed Etty to return the figures to the state in which he had originally painted them.

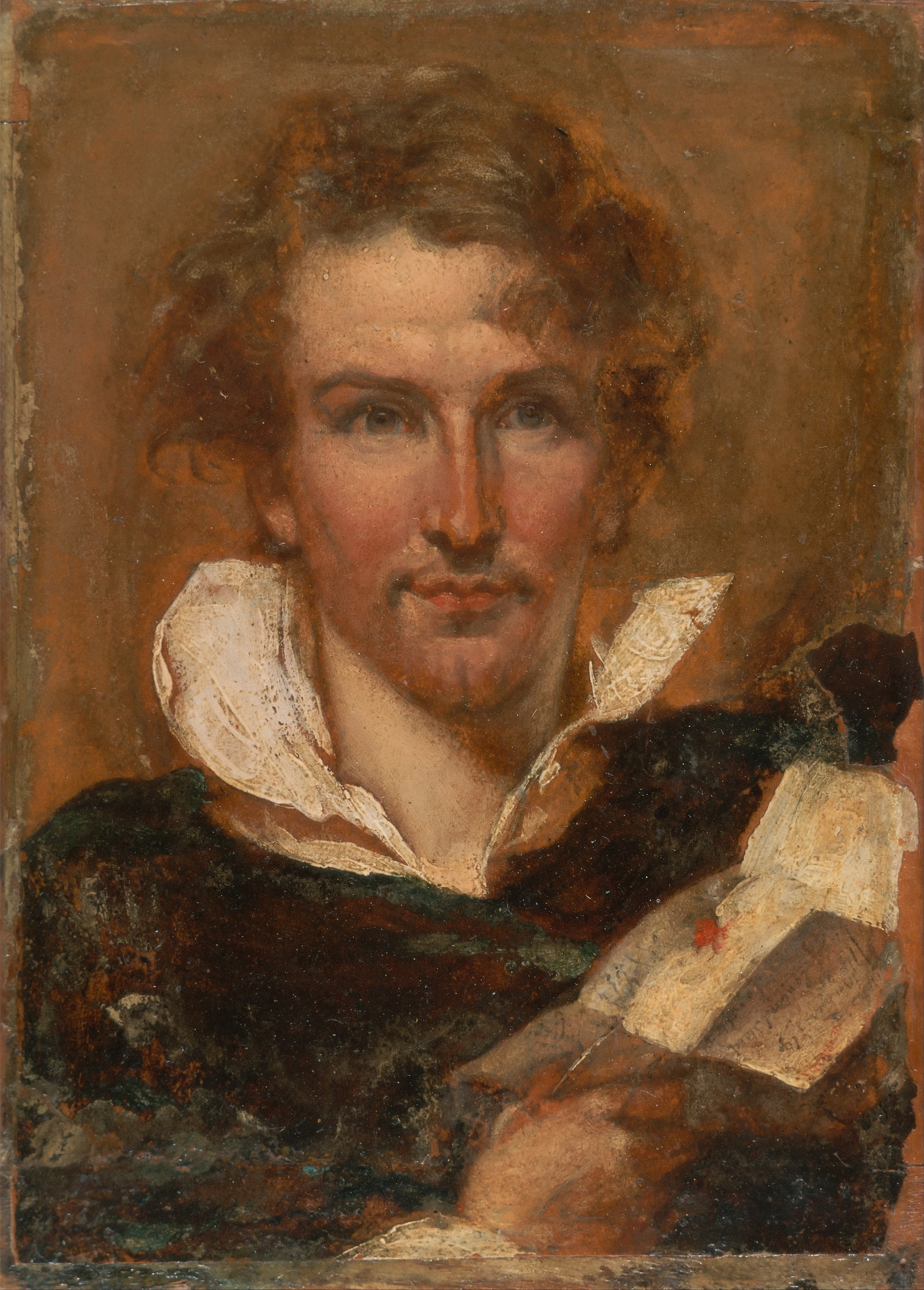
William Etty, self-portrait, 1823

The success of Cleopatra notwithstanding, Etty remained a student at the RA and continued with a rigorous programme of study. Now in his mid 30s, he felt that for his work to progress beyond mere competence he needed a chance to study those European masters whose styles he most admired, despite his unpleasant experiences the last time he left England.

=== Travels in Europe ===
Recalling his homesickness and loneliness the last time he had ventured abroad, for his next foreign trip Etty travelled in the company of Richard Evans, who had been a fellow student of Thomas Lawrence. Despite warnings that Italy would be uncomfortably hot, the two men set out on 23 June 1822 with the aim of reaching Rome. Crossing to France by means of the recently developed steamboat, they arrived in Paris on 26 June. They stayed in Paris for two weeks, visiting Versailles and the city's public art galleries; they also visited the much-reduced remaining exhibits of the Louvre. (Note: By this time, all artworks looted during the wars of the past four decades had been returned to their original owners, leaving the Louvre with a drastically diminished collection.) The Louvre was hosting an exhibition of modern French painting at the time, at which Etty felt a great dislike for the quality of portraiture in France, but he was nonetheless greatly impressed by the permanent collections, in particular Rubens's Marie de' Medici cycle, elements of which he later reused in many of his own works.

Travelling onwards through Dijon and Switzerland, Etty and Evans passed over the Simplon Pass and on to Milan, where they viewed Leonardo's The Last Supper and visited the Brera Gallery. After a sixteen-day cabriolet ride through the gruelling heat of an unusually hot summer, the two men reached Florence, where they stayed for two days visiting the city's galleries. On 10 August, the two men reached Rome.

Although Etty was somewhat disappointed by Rome, comparing the architecture of St. Peter's unfavourably with that of St. Paul's, he was highly impressed with Michelangelo's "almost Venetian" use of colour in the Sistine Chapel. He also met Antonio Canova, to whom he had been recommended by Lawrence, shortly before Canova's death. Rome was at the time suffering badly from malaria, and after two weeks Etty decided to leave for Naples. Evans had contracted malaria and decided to stay in Rome, and so Etty travelled to Naples alone and returned to Rome in the company of actor William Macready, who happened to be making the same journey, and with whom he remained a good friend for the rest of his life. On his return to Rome, Etty toured the city's museums, making copies of various artworks, particularly those of the Venetian artists such as Titian and Veronese whom he so admired.

==== Venice ====
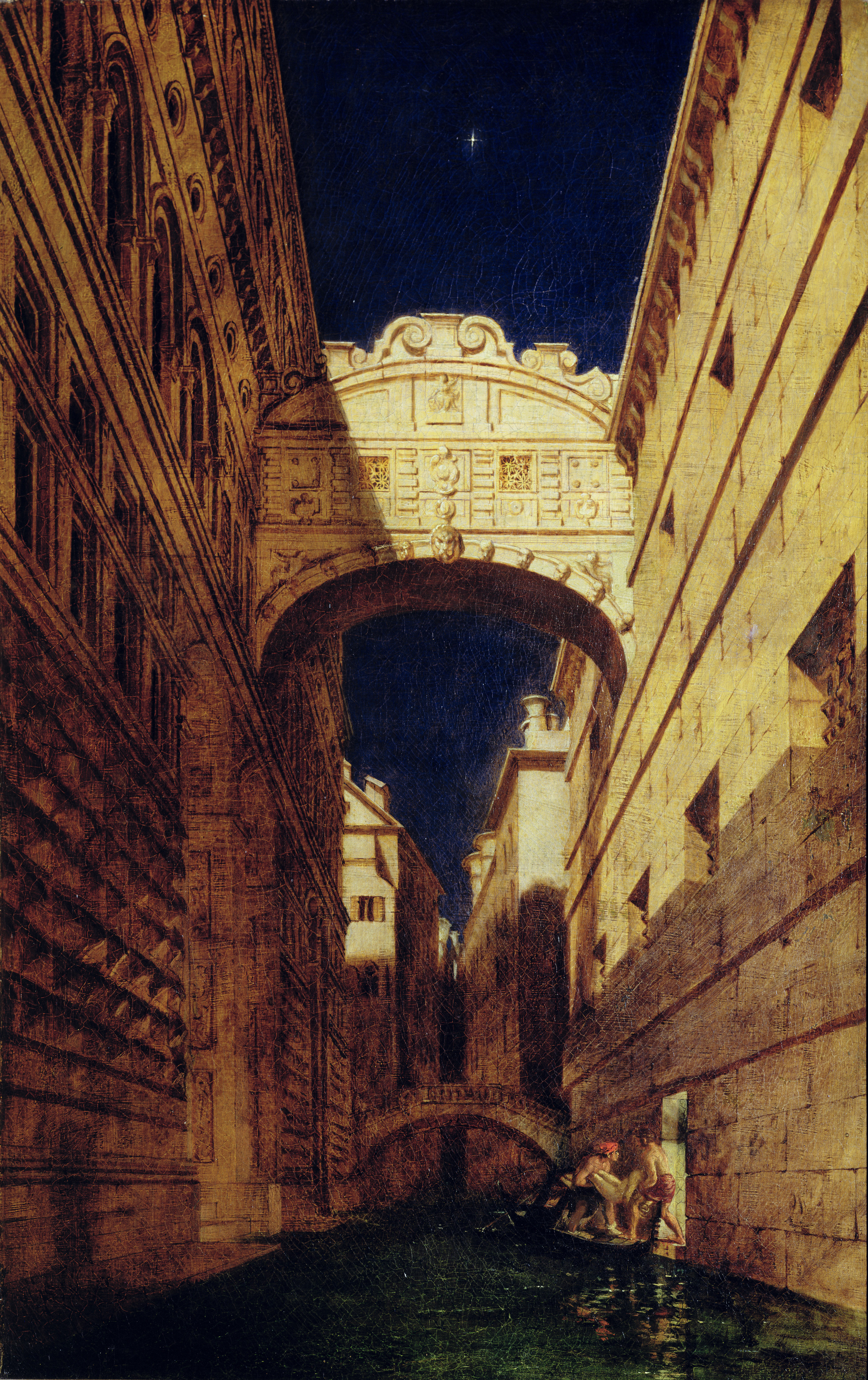
The Bridge of Sighs, Venice (1835), was painted from pencil sketches made by Etty during his 1822 visit. (Note: It is uncertain why Etty waited over 10 years before transforming his preliminary sketches for The Bridge of Sighs into a finished painting. Turner had exhibited a highly acclaimed view of Venice in 1833, and it is possible this inspired Etty to demonstrate that he could depict the same subject with equal skill.)

Feeling unsettled, Etty left Rome for Venice, intending to remain there for 10 days and then return to England. Evans preferred to remain in Rome, so Etty travelled alone, pausing briefly in Florence and in Ferrara (where he stopped to kiss the armchair of Ludovico Ariosto). The painter Charles Lock Eastlake, then resident in Rome, had provided Etty with a letter of introduction to Harry D'Orville, British vice consul in Venice; D'Orville was so impressed with Etty that he arranged for him to stay in his own house, rather than in lodgings. Etty had long considered Venice his spiritual home and "the hope and idol of my professional life", and had often wondered why, given its artistic importance, so few English travellers visited the city. He was not disappointed. Throughout the remainder of his life, he looked back on his visit to Venice with great fondness, writing shortly before his death that "Venezia, cara Venezia! thy pictured glories haunt my fancy now!"

Although Etty had only intended to stay for 10 days, he was so taken with Venice that he remained for over seven months. He fell into a routine of copying paintings in Venetian collections by day, and attending the life class of the Venetian Academy of Fine Arts by night, producing around 50 oil paintings in total as well as numerous pencil sketches. He was extremely impressed with the high quality of the Venetian Academy; the instructors in their turn were extremely impressed with the quality of Etty's work, in particular his flesh tones. He acquired the nickname of "Il Diavolo" owing to the high speed at which he was able to paint, and watching him at work became something of a spectacle in its own right; Gioachino Rossini, Ladislaus Pyrker (then Patriarch of Venice) and others came to watch him paint. So devoted was Etty to his studies in Venice that he exhibited no original work in 1823, writing to his brother that "If one spent all the time in painting originals, one might as well, nay better, be at home". The members of the Venetian Academy were so impressed by Etty that he was elected an Honorary Academician. (Note: The Venetian Academy also named Thomas Lawrence—then highly popular in Italy following the installation of his George IV at the Vatican—as an Honorary Academician, giving Etty the diploma to deliver on his return to England. Etty wrote to Lawrence that "by electing you, they honored their own body; by electing me, they honored only myself".)

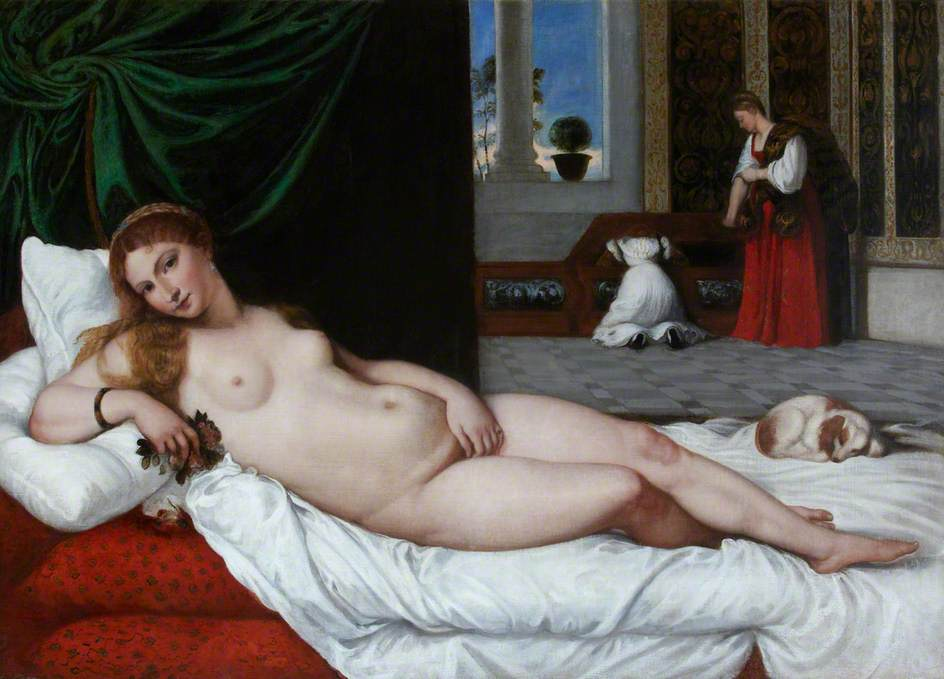
Etty's 1823 copy of Titian's Venus of Urbino was considered among the finest copies of that painting ever made. Etty was particularly pleased with this work and rejected all offers to purchase it, keeping it in his studio until his death.

By 7 June 1823, Etty felt that he had reached the limits of what he could accomplish in Venice, and was considering returning home. Soon afterwards he left Venice for Florence, with the intention of creating a full-size replica of Titian's Venus of Urbino, considered one of the finest works of the Venetian school of painting. Although the Uffizi management were hostile to this proposal, after 10 days of negotiations they allowed Etty to create his copy. His contemporaries considered it among the finest copies ever made of a painting generally considered to be impossible to copy. In late July Etty began the journey home, pausing for a further two months in Venice. On 8 October 1823, Etty left Venice, travelling via Mantua and Geneva to Paris.

Etty had intended to travel to England, but instead remained in Paris, to resume copying works in Paris galleries, collecting prints and buying a lay figure and around 200 paintbrushes, both of which the French made to a higher standard than English manufacturers. In early January 1824, Etty returned to London.

== Success and controversy (1824–1835) ==
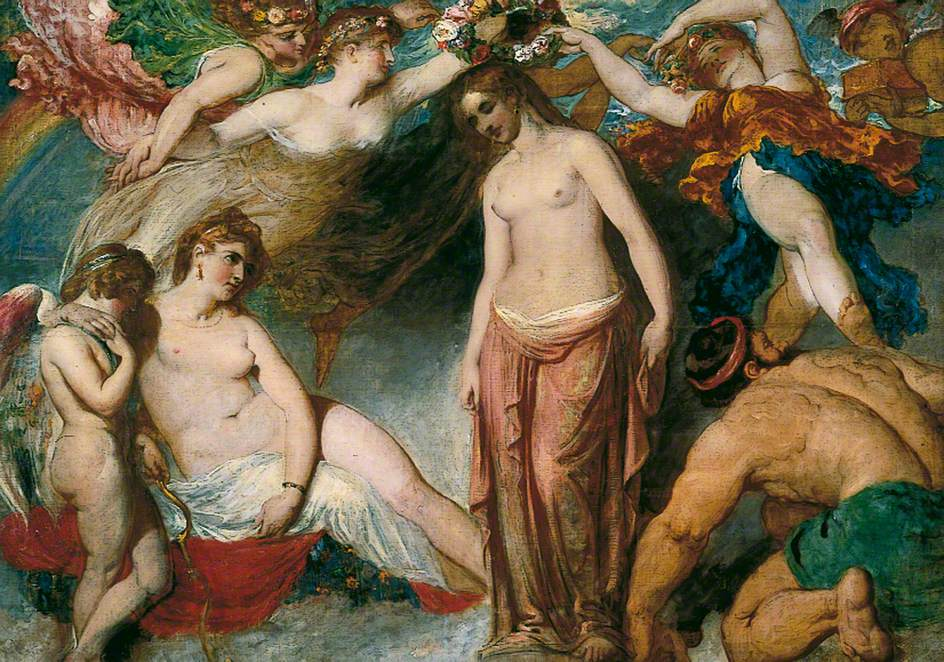
Incomplete first version

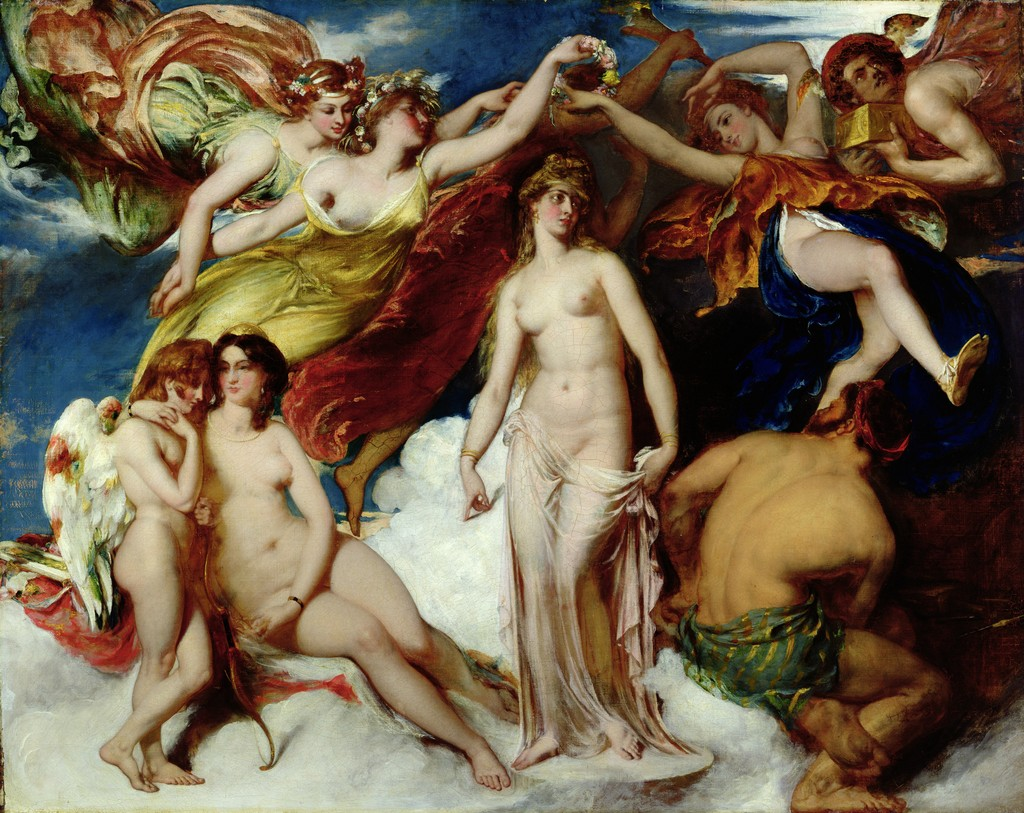
The finished Pandora

Etty abandoned the first of his 1824 Pandora paintings half-complete, and exhibited the second.

As soon as he arrived home, Etty began to work on ensuring he had at least one picture ready for the 1824 Summer Exhibition. He decided to return to a theme for which he had created a sketch in 1820, that of the story of Pandora and in particular the passage in Hesiod in which the seasons crown her with a wreath. He had exhibited a sketch in 1820 on the same theme, and had already decided on the arrangement of the figures. His first attempt in 1824 was abandoned half-finished, and he began again on a smaller canvas with different positioning of the key figures of Pandora, Vulcan and Venus.

Pandora Crowned by the Seasons is an unusual composition, painted to resemble a bas-relief in which the different elements are emerging from a flat background. The figure of Pandora stands in the centre, with Vulcan to one side and Venus and Cupid to the other, each leaning away from her; the figures of Vulcan and Venus, along with the four figures representing the seasons in the upper corners of the canvas, create a diamond shape around Pandora. The foot of Vulcan rests upon the picture frame, a favourite device of Rubens; elements of the picture's composition are also taken from an 1817 engraving on the same subject, drawn by Etty's fellow York artist John Flaxman and engraved by William Blake. As with all Etty's history paintings from this time on, he worked by painting the figures first, and only filling in the background once the figures were complete.

Although recognisably descended from earlier works such as The Coral Finder, Pandora was a far more accomplished work than those Etty exhibited prior to his travels. Although some critics were reluctant to accept Etty's combination of realistic figures and an unrealistic setting (Etty's 1958 biographer Dennis Farr characterises the critical reaction to Pandora as "grudging admiration not unmixed with philistinism"), his fellow artists were extremely impressed with it, to the extent that Thomas Lawrence bought the painting at the 1824 Summer Exhibition.

In the wake of the success of Pandora, Etty moved to an apartment in Buckingham Street near the Strand, where he was to reside for the remainder of his working life. Shortly afterwards he applied to become an Associate of the Royal Academy for the first time, and on 1 November was duly elected, beating William Allan by 16 votes to seven. (The Times, at this time still hostile to Etty for his perceived indecency, sneered that "this cannot be as an honour conferred on Mr. Etty: if it were, he has deserved and should have obtained it long ago". The same reviewer did concede that Etty's copy of Tintoretto's Esther Before Ahaseurus was "the most important picture in the room" in their report on an exhibition held at the British Institution of significant copies of paintings.)

=== Betsy Etty ===
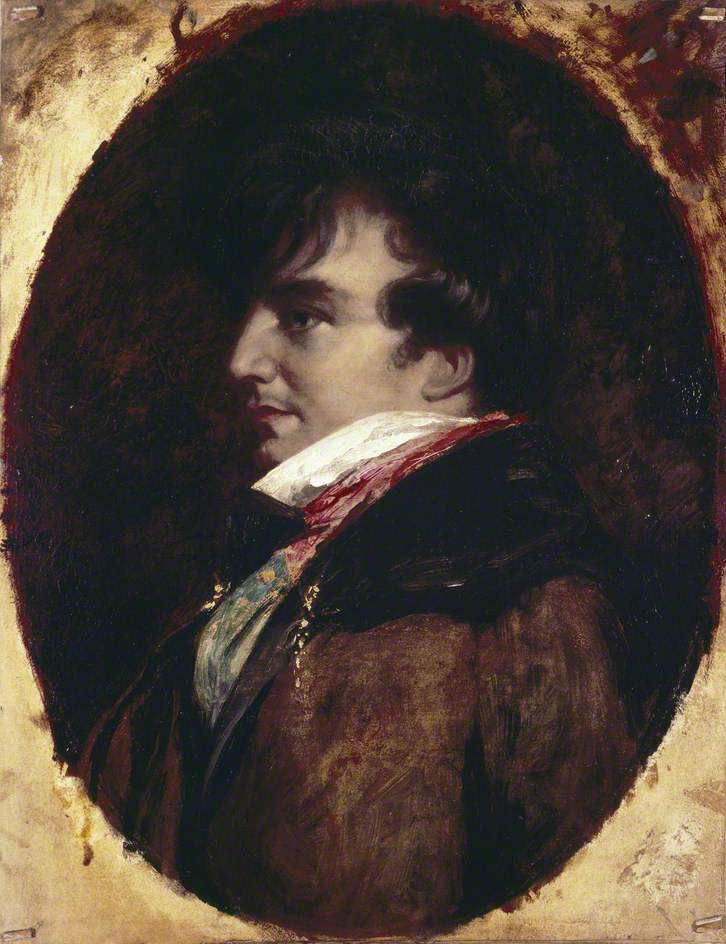
William Etty, self-portrait, 1825. This was painted when Etty was trying to advertise himself as a young and successful artist, and bears little resemblance to his real appearance.

In the years following his return from Italy, Etty had a very limited social life. In a typical day he woke at 7 am, painting from around 9 or 10 am until 4 pm, after which he had a meal. Following the meal he took a walk, and attended life classes between 6 and 8 pm. On returning home he drank two cups of tea, and went to bed at midnight.

Etty was considered extremely unattractive, described by his 1855 biographer Alexander Gilchrist—a great admirer—as "Slovenly in attire, short and awkward in body—large head, large hands, large feet—a face marked with the small-pox, made still more noticeable by length of jaw, and a quantity of sandy hair, long and wild: all, conspired to make him 'one of the oddest looking creatures' in a Young Lady's eyes—what she would call 'a sight'; one, not redeemed (to her), by the massive brow, its revelation of energy and power, the sign-manual of Genius there legible."

One of his few close companions was his niece Betsy (Elizabeth Etty), fifth daughter of his brother John. Betsy was unmarried and 14 years younger than William, and became his housekeeper in 1824. She remained in his service for the rest of his life, and as he grew older William increasingly came to depend on her, suffering distress whenever they were apart and regularly writing to her in panic whenever he did not hear from her. She became his companion and acted as his assistant, alongside his official assistant George Franklin.

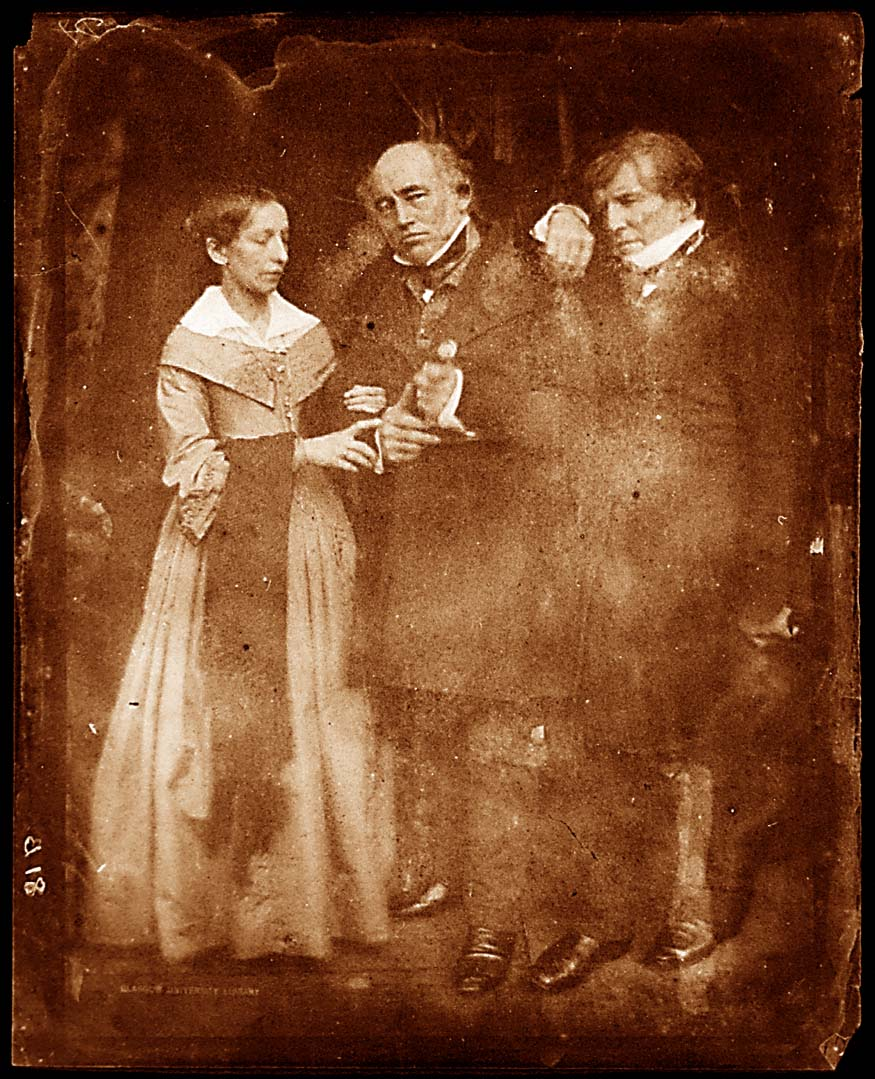
Betsy (left), Charles (centre) and William (right), October 1844

While he appears to have been attracted to young women throughout his life, and there is a strong suggestion in his letters that in his early years he had a sexual encounter with one of his models and possibly also a sexual encounter of some kind while in Venice, there is no suggestion that he ever had a sexual relationship with Betsy of any kind. (Note: Professor Jason Edwards of the University of York, writing in 2011, thinks it likely Etty was secretly homosexual. It is certain that he often met men in public bath-houses and invite them to pose nude for him.) He recorded in his diary in 1830 that "it is best I have not married because I have not noisy Children and can have nice Books, and Pictures etc". He suffered from extreme shyness throughout his life, and when compelled to attend dinner parties would often sit silent throughout, although he was popular with fellow artists and students. Etty rarely socialised, preferring to concentrate on his painting; when on one occasion it was suggested that he had little further need of training and need not continue attending classes, he indignantly replied that "it fills up a couple of hours in the evening, I should be at a loss how else to employ".

As she grew older Betsy suffered from numerous illnesses, the exact natures of which are not recorded but which are known to have caused William great concern. William began to fear that Betsy would marry and leave his service, in 1835 going as far as to have her sign an affidavit that she would never leave him. In 1843 his younger brother Charles, a successful planter in Java, returned to England after over 30 years abroad. William became deeply suspicious that Betsy was becoming too close to Charles, a suspicion intensified when Charles took her on a visit to Holland and the Rhine; Charles returned to Java in 1845. In around 1844 Betsy struck up a close relationship with the pen manufacturer and art collector Joseph Gillott, one of William's regular customers who owned some of his pictures. Gillott was married with children, and the closeness of their relationship caused William concern. In 1848, William retired to York leaving Betsy alone in his London apartment; although aware that Betsy was considering marriage he was confident that he could persuade her to come to York and live with him in his retirement. Betsy did eventually join him in York, and was present at his death.

=== The Combat ===
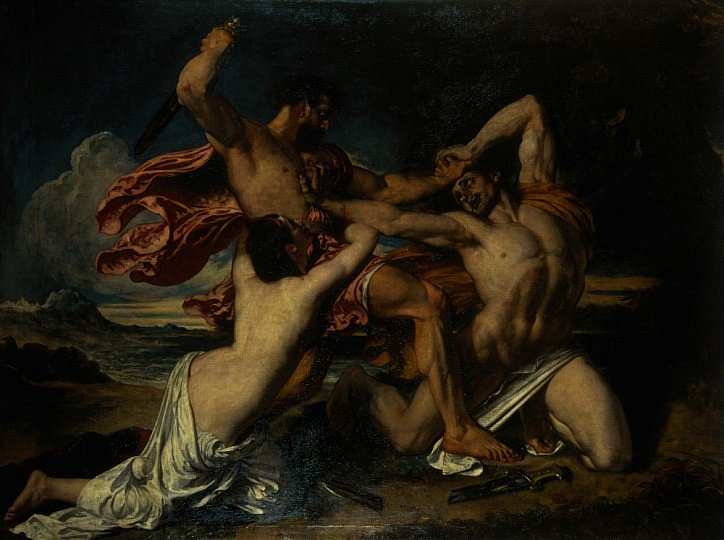
The Combat: Woman Pleading for the Vanquished, William Etty (1825).

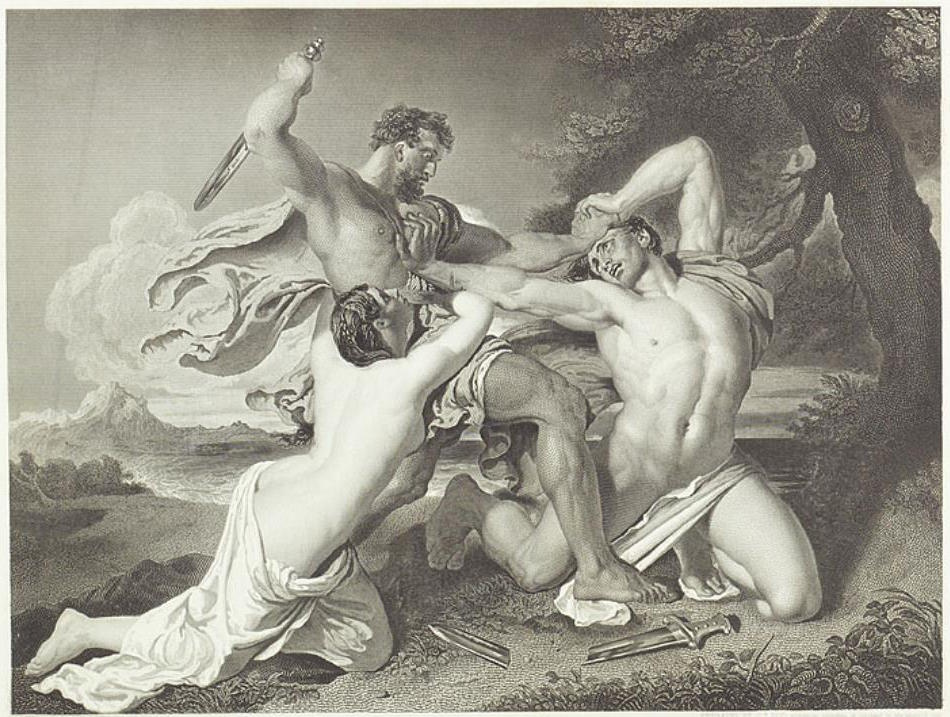
G. T. Doo engraving, 1848, based on a version completed by Etty in 1845.

Spurred by the reception of Pandora, in 1825 Etty exhibited his most ambitious work to date, The Combat: Woman Pleading for the Vanquished. This was a huge canvas, 399 cm (13 ft 1 in) across, showing a woman pleading for the life of a defeated soldier as another soldier prepares to kill him. Highly unusually for a history painting at the time, Etty did not base The Combat on an incident from literature, religion or history, but instead painted a scene entirely from his own imagination, based on an idea which had first occurred to him in 1821. (He was later to describe this type of painting as "that class of compositions called by the Romans Visions, not having their origin in history or poetry".)

The Combat was extremely well received, even by critics who had previously been hostile to Etty. In terms of composition and technique it was considered as equalling or even surpassing Titian and Veronese, and one critic considered it "one of the finest and most masterly works that ever graced the walls of the Royal Academy", while those critics who had previously dismissed Etty for his supposed obscenity reconsidered their opinions in light of it. (Note: Despite the high regard in which it was held, The Combat failed to sell at the Summer Exhibition. It was bought from Etty by fellow artist John Martin for 300 guineas (about £24,000 in 2025 terms), following a promise Martin had made to Etty before the painting was complete. At over 13 feet wide, the painting was too large for Martin's house, and he sold it to the Royal Scottish Academy six years later.) The Combat continued to be one of Etty's best-regarded works, and formed the basis of a successful 1848 engraving by George Thomas Doo.

Following the success of The Combat, Etty painted a further four very large paintings. One was on the well-worn theme of the Judgement of Paris, exhibited in 1826, and three were on the theme of Judith beheading Holofernes, the first of which was exhibited in 1827. (Note: The other two Judith paintings were commissioned in 1829 to form a triptych with the original, by the Royal Scottish Academy who had bought the first painting in that year. Etty used bitumen to accentuate the shadows in the Judith paintings, which over the next century caused them to deteriorate beyond repair.) Unlike other artists who had painted this subject, Etty's Judith paintings did not show the actual beheading, as he hoped to avoid "the offensive and revolting butchery, some have delighted and even revelled in". The first Judith picture in particular was extremely well received critically.

=== Royal Academician ===
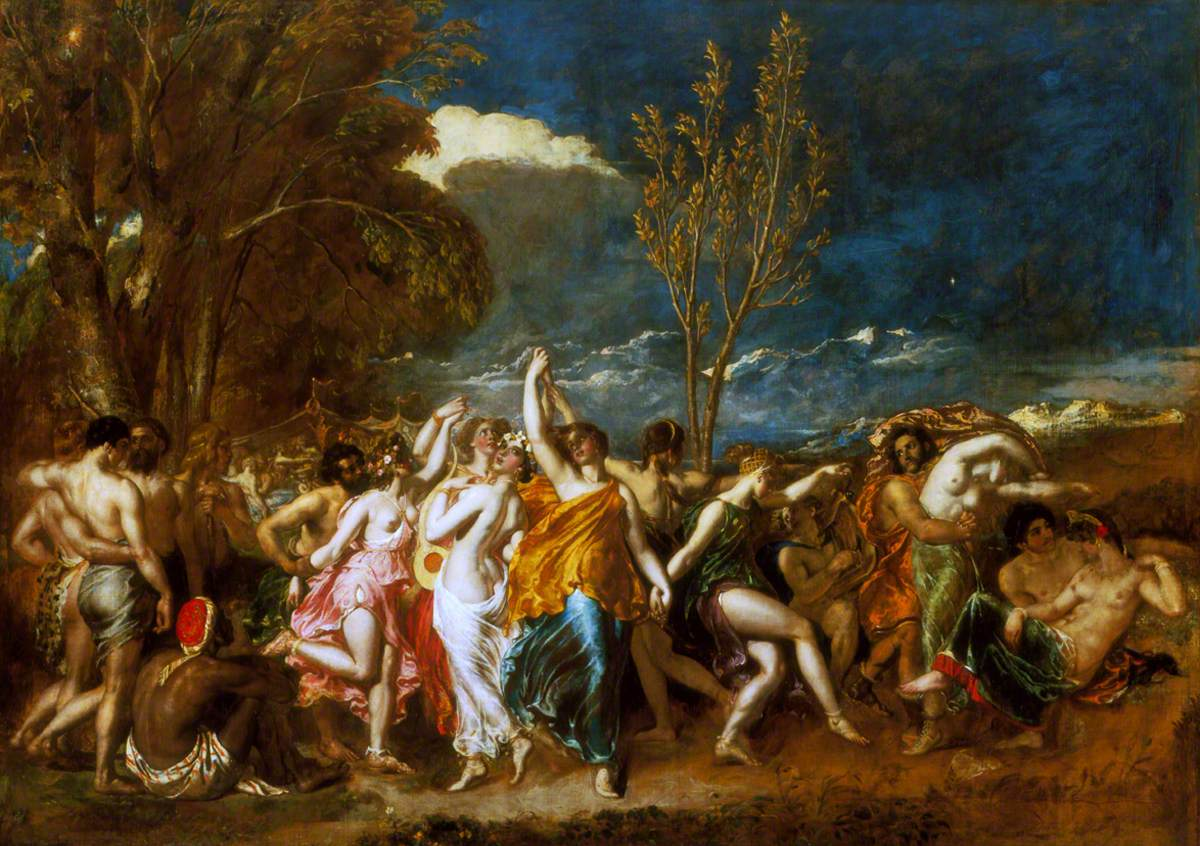
The World Before the Flood (1828) was intended to illustrate John Milton's Paradise Lost.

In February 1828, shortly before his 41st birthday, Etty soundly defeated John Constable by 18 votes to five to become a full Royal Academician, at the time the highest honour available to an artist. (Note: In Etty's time, honours such as knighthoods were only bestowed on presidents of major institutions, not on even the most well respected artists.) By this time, complaints about his supposed indecency were beginning to resurface. All but one of the 15 paintings Etty exhibited at the Royal Academy in the 1820s had included at least one nude figure, and Etty was acquiring a reputation for using respectable themes as a pretext for nudity.

For the 1828 Summer Exhibition Etty exhibited three pictures; The World Before the Flood, Venus, the Evening Star and Guardian Cherubs. (The latter was a portrait of the children of Welbore Agar, 2nd Earl of Normanton, and was the only non-nude painting exhibited by Etty at the RA in the 1820s.) Although similar to his earlier works, they were technically more accomplished. Both The World Before the Flood and Venus attracted positive reviews in the press and were sold during their exhibition for substantial sums, although the purchase by the Marquess of Stafford of The World Before the Flood—a work containing scantily clad figures of both sexes—drew a pointed comment in The Gentleman's Magazine that it "will serve to accompany the private Titians of that nobleman". Despite the increasing number of complaints in the press about his use of nudity, respect for Etty from his fellow artists continued to rise, and in 1828 the British Institution awarded him £100 in recognition of his talent.

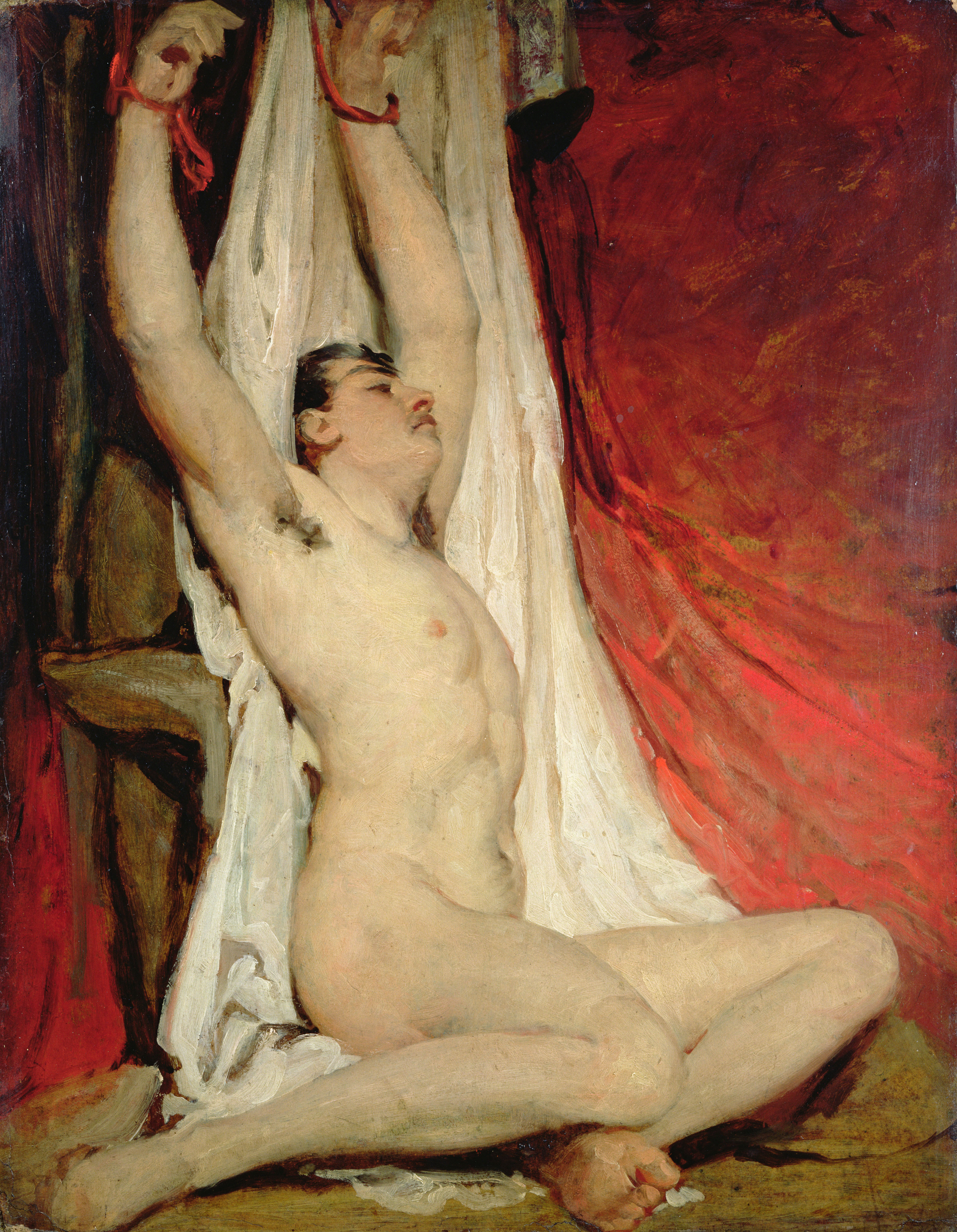
Male Nude, with Arms Up-Stretched (1828). Despite his high status, Etty continued to study at the RA life classes. Professor Jason Edwards of the University of York suggests that this image may have been intended to be hung horizontally with the model on his back, but it is more likely to be a study for a Descent from the Cross. As of 2011, this painting was the York Art Gallery's best-selling postcard.

As soon as the 1828 Summer Exhibition was over, Etty stopped work on other projects to concentrate on a diploma piece, without which he could not become a Royal Academician. This piece, Sleeping Nymph and Satyrs, was presented to the Academy in October, and in December 1828 Etty became a Royal Academician. (Note: Upon election to the Royal Academy, candidates were required to produce a diploma work within a year, to demonstrate their abilities and to leave the RA with a permanent record of the artist's distinctive style and philosophies. While some artists disliked the requirement to produce a significant work for no material reward, Etty took the task of illustrating his ability and style extremely seriously, and Sleeping Nymph and Satyrs combines his distinctive attributes of rich colours, pastiche of Poussin, Reynolds and the Old Masters, and nudes painted from life. The painting was considered morally questionable, and was never publicly exhibited in Etty's lifetime. It remains in the collection of the Royal Academy.)

It appears to me then that virtuous happiness being our lawful aim in life, that having Academic Rank and Fame the next thing to be considered (if God approve) is to seek that Decent Competency which shall make my latter days comfortable and happy, which I hope if it please Him, to be able to do by the time I am fifty—by occasionally mixing with my historic pictures a Portrait or two, and to vary and extend my sphere—a classic Landscape or two so that if I can get about 100 a year I may be enabled to retire to my dear native city and spend my latter days in peace.

— William Etty, writing in around 1830–31.

==== Life classes ====
Even after he had achieved status as a full Royal Academician, Etty regularly attended life classes; fellow artist John Constable sarcastically wrote that "Etty [sets] an excellent example to the Modles [sic] for regularity". His contemporaries considered this at best peculiar and at worst extremely inappropriate, complaining that for someone in his senior position to attend classes as a student was both unprofessional and unnecessary, and that it damaged the standing of the position of Academician; there were complaints that he had far outlasted the official student term of 10 years. Etty refused to give up attendance, offering to resign rather than give up his studies, and the Academy grudgingly allowed him to continue to attend classes. He divided his time between the RA's own life classes and those at nearby St. Martin's Lane.

Etty generally finished life studies during three evenings' sittings. On the first evening he would sketch the model in charcoal or chalk, and then ink in the outline. On the second he used oil paints to fill in the figures. On the third he layered glaze and the final coverings of paint. He usually painted on millboard, re-using the reverse for fresh paintings. His female models were typically shop-girls, prostitutes, actresses or poses plastiques models, while his male models tended to be Life Guards recruited from the nearby barracks, who he thought to have an appropriate muscular physique, or occasionally men Etty met in public bath houses.

==== Hero and Leander ====
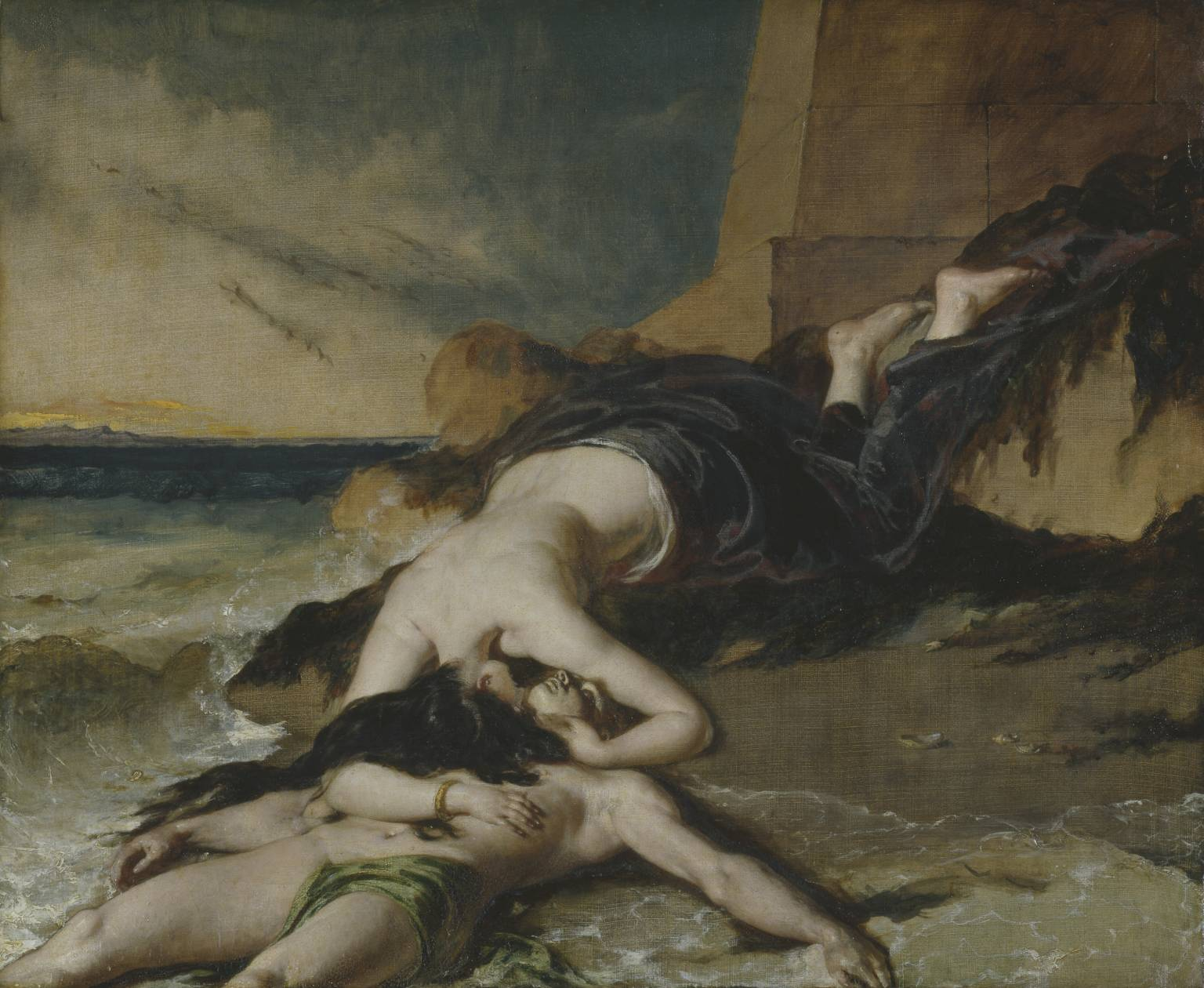
Etty thought Hero and Leander (1829) one of his best works.

In the wake of Etty's elevation to Academician, he exhibited two paintings at the Summer Exhibition in 1829, Benaiah, David's Chief Captain and Hero, Having Thrown Herself from the Tower at the Sight of Leander Drowned, Dies on his Body. Benaiah is on the same large scale as The Combat at 398 cm (13 ft 1 in) wide, and is a very similar composition, although in place of the woman begging for mercy is the body of a dead soldier. Hero recycles the pose of the dead soldier from Benaiah as the dying Hero as she lies on the body of her dead lover. Unusually for Etty, Hero is painted in intentionally neutral tones rather than his usual Venetian colours, and the composition uses foreshortening of the bodies to create a single diagonal across the canvas. For the rest of his life, Etty considered Hero to be "the finest of my fine pictures".

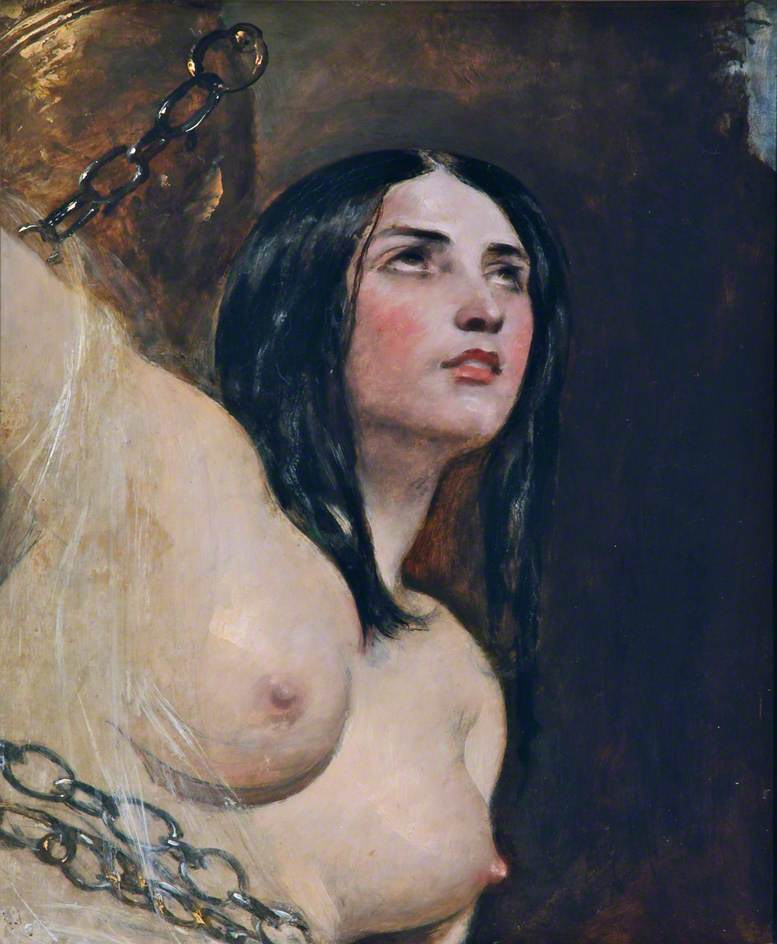
Andromeda (c. 1830). Etty often added elements from literature to his life studies to allow him to sell them as history paintings. The Lady Lever Art Gallery notes that the later addition of chains to transform this nude study into Andromeda "cannot be said to have had precisely the effect intended". (Note: In full: "Etty's reputation suffered from his preoccupation with the female nude, chiefly on account of paintings such as this. It was probably painted as a study from the model in the life class at the Royal Academy. Etty's regular attendance at the class, even when he was a senior Academician, aroused widespread comment, and his subsequent addition of chains—in order to elevate the figure into the classical figure of Andromeda, who was left chained to a rock as a victim for a dragon—cannot be said to have had the precise effect intended.")

On 7 January 1830 Etty's mentor Thomas Lawrence died, followed on 30 July by Etty's mother. Etty was devastated by the loss, and was one of those considered to replace Lawrence as President of the Royal Academy, although in the event he did not stand for election. Possibly distracted by the death of Lawrence, Etty submitted only three paintings to the Summer Exhibition that year. One of these, Judith Going Forth, was an addition to Judith, which had been commissioned the previous year by that painting's new owners, the Royal Scottish Academy.

==== Candaules ====
Of Etty's two original works exhibited at the RA in 1830, The Storm, inspired by Psalm 22, attracted little interest and was dismissed by The Gentleman's Magazine—typically a staunch supporter of Etty's work—as "a sad failure". The other painting exhibited was Candaules, King of Lydia, Shews his Wife by Stealth to Gyges, One of his Ministers, as She Goes to Bed, which was to prove one of the most controversial works of Etty's career. Candaules is based on a story from Herodotus in which king Candaules arranges for his servant Gyges to spy on his wife Nyssia undressing without her knowledge. Gyges is discovered and at Nyssia's behest kills Candaules, marries Nyssia and rules the kingdom in his stead. The painting shows the moment at which Nyssia removes the last of her clothes. By positioning the figures in such a way that none are looking out of the picture, and the viewer is directly behind Nyssia, Etty aimed for the viewer to feel the same sense of voyeurism and intrusion that Gyges would have felt, forced to spy on his master's naked wife against his will and without her knowledge.

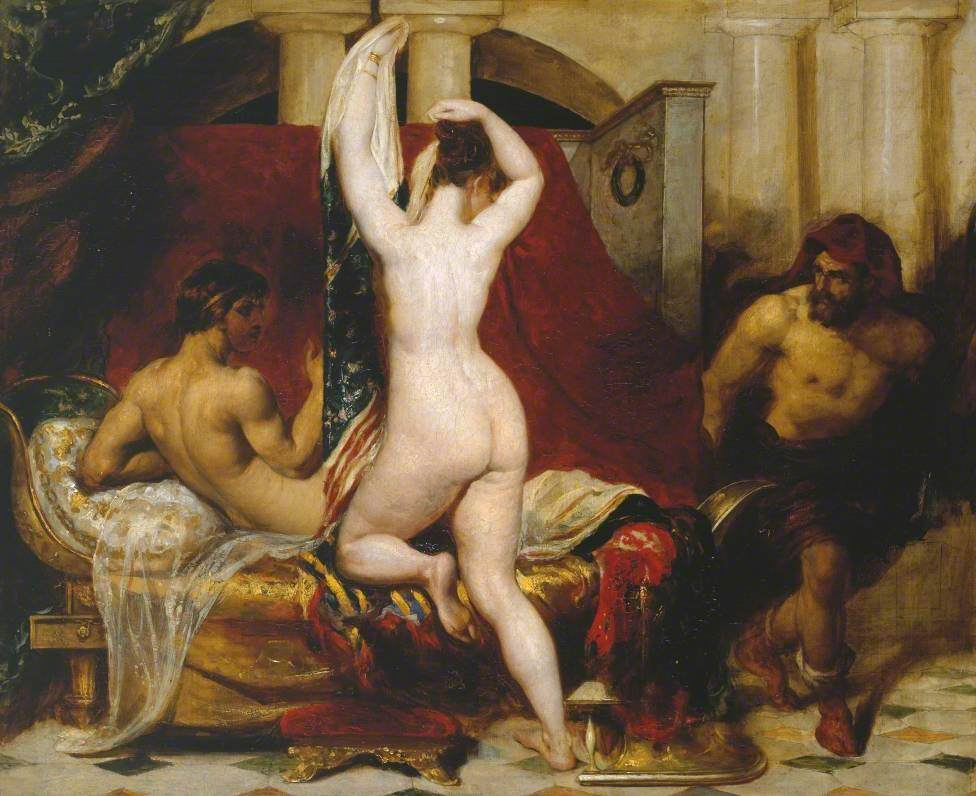
Candaules, King of Lydia, Shews his Wife by Stealth to Gyges, One of his Ministers, as She Goes to Bed (1830)

Etty felt that the work illustrated the moral that women are not chattels, and were entitled to punish men who violated their rights. He made little effort to explain this to his audience, and thus Candaules appeared morally highly ambiguous, inviting the viewer to sympathise either with the sexually immoral Candaules, the murderous Nyssia or the voyeuristic Gyges. From the moment it was unveiled Candaules was condemned as a cynical mix of a distasteful narrative and pornographic images, and there was near-unanimous consensus that it was inappropriate for public exhibition. The piece remained controversial long after Etty's death; Alexander Gilchrist's overwhelmingly flattering 1855 biography of Etty described it as "almost the only instance among Etty's works, of an undeniably disagreeable, not to say objectionable subject", while as late as 2011 Sarah Burnage of the University of York wrote of Candaules that "it is perhaps hard to see the painting as anything but a deliberate attempt by the artist to shock and scandalise". Candaules was bought by wealthy collector Robert Vernon, who was in the process of building a major collection of British art and was to become one of Etty's most important customers.

With the three paintings for the 1830 Summer Exhibition completed, Etty decided to pay another visit to Paris. Etty travelled via Brighton, arriving in Paris in early July 1830. He found the atmosphere of the city had become unpleasantly hedonistic, writing to Betsy that "If I had a daughter, she should not be educated here. Pleasure and amusement are the idols."

France was in constitutional crisis in 1830, which reached a peak in late July as the July Revolution began and riots erupted across Paris. Although moved by the death and destruction taking place around him, Etty felt that the purpose of his visit was to study paintings, and continued to attend the Louvre to copy paintings as the violence raged in the surrounding streets. On 31 July he decided to abandon the trip; abandoning his proposed onward journey to Brussels and Antwerp, he collected the five copies he had made in the Louvre and set off for London.

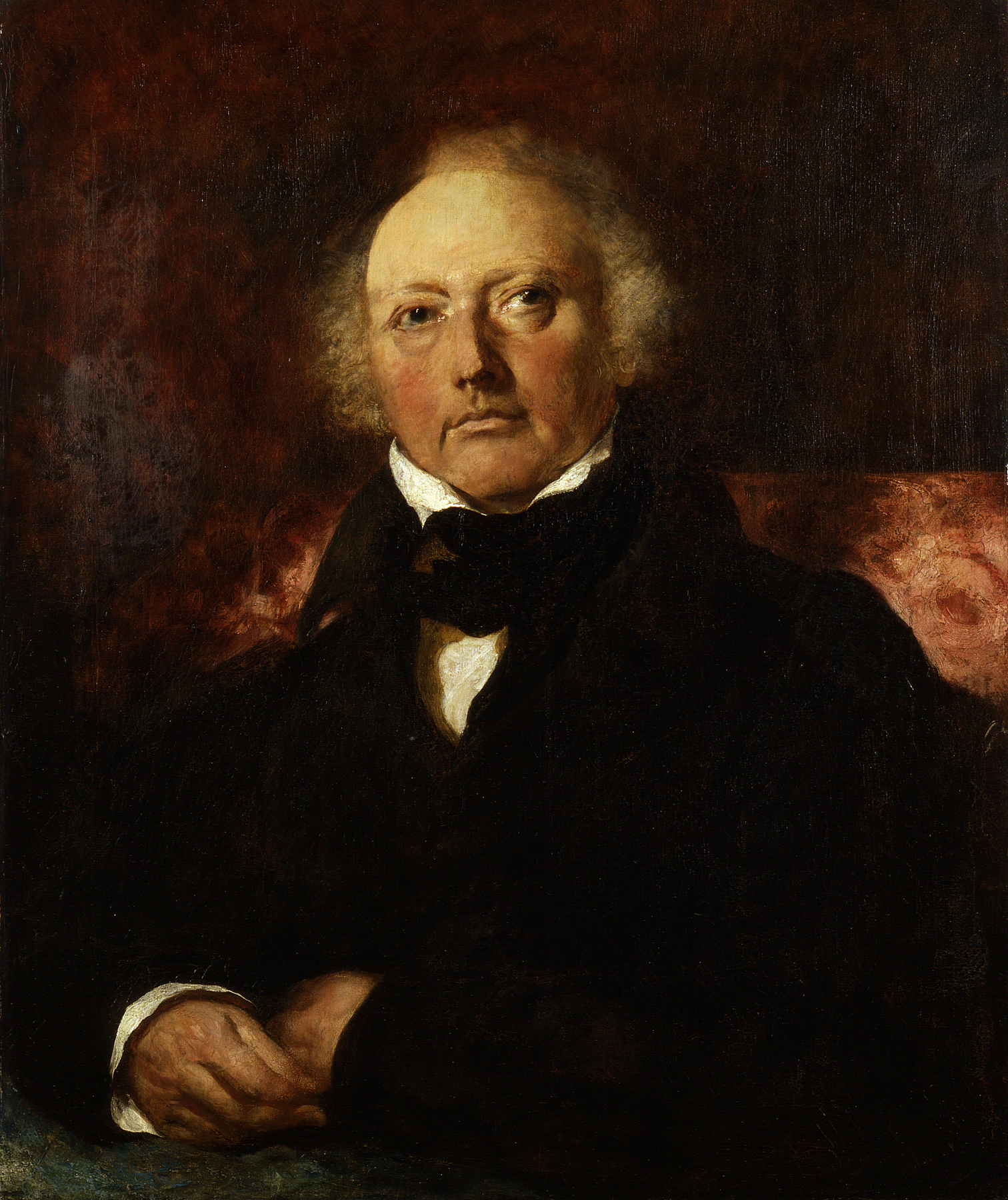
James Atkinson (1832). Surgeon James Atkinson was the founder of the Yorkshire Philosophical Society, of which Etty was a member. David Wilkie thought this one of the best portraits in England.

The works Etty painted following his return began to show a departure in style from his previous efforts. While the figures in his previous original paintings had been painted from sketches of models made in the studio or life classes, from now on he began to work from memory, and as a consequence his figures began to appear more idealised; Farr (1958) describes his figures from now on as "[conforming] less to a particular aspect of the model than to a preconceived notion of what the model ought to look like".

==== Youth and Pleasure and The Destroying Angel ====
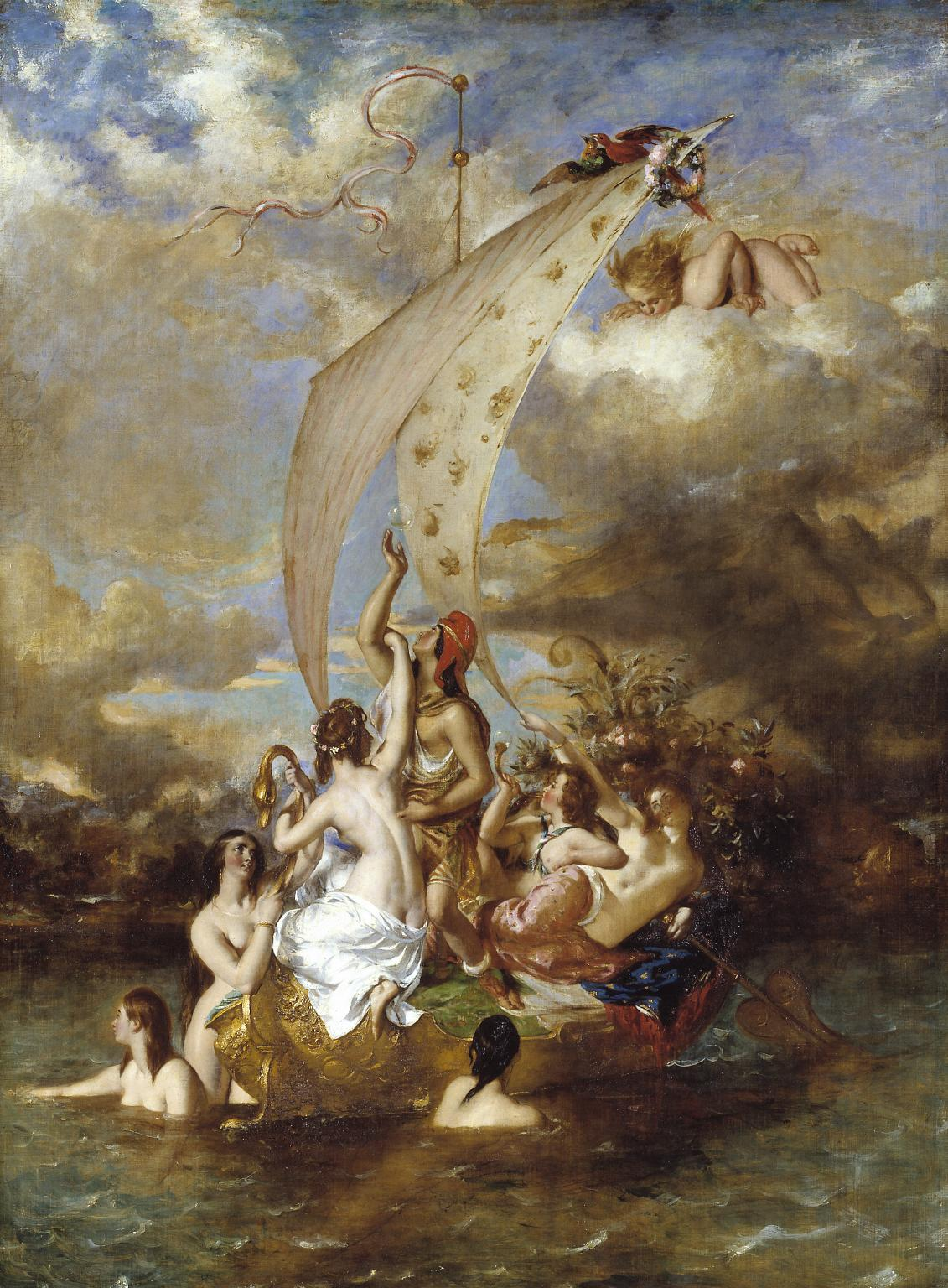
Youth on the Prow, and Pleasure at the Helm (1832)

In 1832 Etty returned to the theme of A Sketch from One of Gray's Odes, exhibited in 1822 to such disdain from the press. The result was Youth on the Prow, and Pleasure at the Helm, which remains one of his best known works. Illustrating a passage from The Bard, a poem by Thomas Gray, Youth and Pleasure has been described as "a poetic romance". It shows a gilded boat being propelled by the breath of a nude child on the sails; one nude figure representing Pleasure languidly holds the helm of the boat. A nude child blows bubbles, which another nude on the prow of the ship, representing Youth, reaches to catch. Naiads, again nude, swim around and clamber onto the boat.

The Bard was about the English destruction of Welsh culture and the subsequent decline of the House of Plantagenet and its replacement by the Welsh House of Tudor, and there was a general feeling among critics that Etty had misunderstood the point of the metaphors used by Gray. Etty claimed that his unusual interpretation of the text was intended to create "a general allegory of Human Life, its empty vain pleasures—if not founded on the laws of Him who is the Rock of Ages", and that the painting served as a moral warning about the pursuit of empty pleasure. This explanation appears to have left critics unconvinced. Even those critics most favourable towards Etty's technical accomplishments in creating the picture found it hard to ascertain what the painting was supposed to represent; other critics were more openly hostile, with The Morning Chronicle condemning it as "indulgence of what we once hoped a classical, but which are now convinced, is a lascivious mind". Purchased for a huge sum by Robert Vernon on its exhibition, (Note: The price Vernon paid for Youth and Pleasure is not recorded, although Etty's cashbook records a partial payment of £250 (about £24,000 in 2025 terms) so it is likely to have been a substantial sum. Vernon's later moving of Youth and Pleasure to make way for John Constable's The Valley Farm prompted the comment from Constable that "My picture is to go into the place—where Etty's "Bumboat" is at present—his picture with its precious freight is to be brought down nearer to the nose." Youth and Pleasure was among the 11 Etty paintings presented by Vernon to the National Gallery in 1847, and in 1949 it was transferred to the Tate Gallery, where as of 2015 it remains.) Youth and Pleasure remained controversial long after Etty's death, with Farr's 1958 biography describing it as "singularly inept".

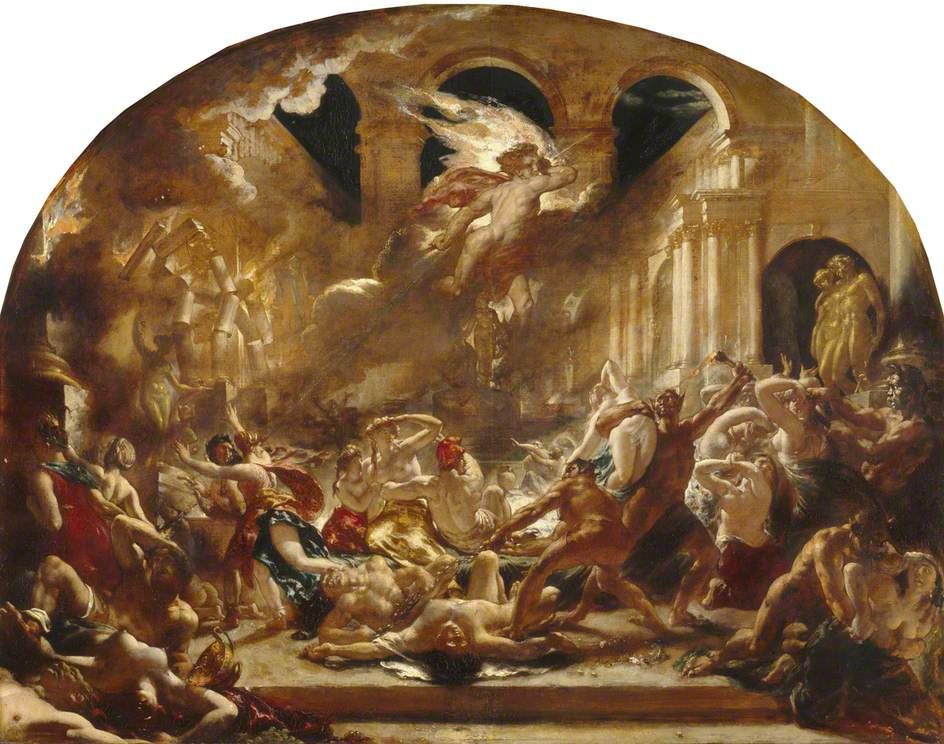
The Destroying Angel (1832)

Also exhibited at the 1832 Summer Exhibition along with Youth and Pleasure was The Destroying Angel and Daemons of Evil Interrupting the Orgies of the Vicious and Intemperate, seen as a riposte by Etty to his critics. Another of what Etty deemed "visions", depicting a wholly imaginary scene rather than one from literature, mythology or history, The Destroying Angel shows an imaginary classical temple under attack from a destroying angel and a group of daemons. The human figures, intentionally painted in paler tones than usual to suggest death, each show their fear in a different way. Painted soon after his 1830 travels, it is thought that the heaped corpses and terrified crowds were directly inspired by events Etty had witnessed in Paris.

Unlike Youth and Pleasure, the critical response to The Destroying Angel was generally favourable even from those critics usually hostile to Etty. The painting generated favourable comparisons to Michelangelo and Rubens, and Etty's early supporter William Carey (writing under the name of "Ridolfi") considered it to be evidence of Etty's "redeeming grace and spirit". The painting was explicitly seen as a renunciation by Etty of his previous nude studies, with Fraser's Magazine described it as "a sermon to [Etty's] admirers ... where he inflicts poetical justice upon his own gay dames and their gallants, their revels being broken in upon, and they themselves being carried off most unceremoniously, like that little gentleman Don Juan, by sundry grim-looking brawny devils".

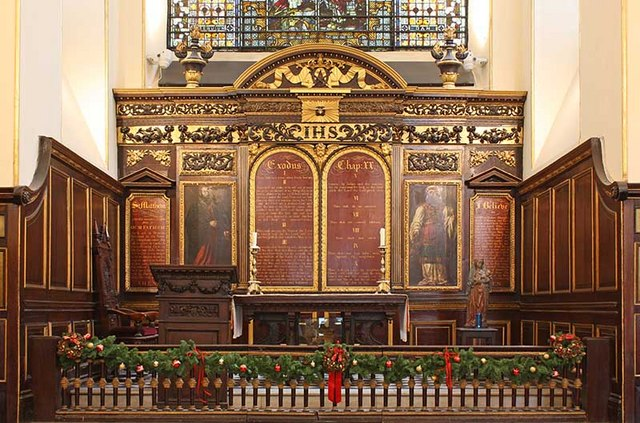
Reredos of St Edmund, King and Martyr, painted by Etty in 1833. The London branch of the Etty family had links to the church from the 1770s onwards. Etty painted Christian paintings throughout his career, in particular Penitent Magdalenes.

At around this time Etty began to receive many unsolicited letters from wealthy Old Etonian lawyer Thomas Myers. Myers was a huge admirer of Etty, and his letters mainly suggest literary topics he felt Etty ought to be painting so as to appeal to the nobility; he wrote regularly between July 1832 and May 1844. Although eccentric and largely incoherent (one of his suggestions was for Etty to raise his profile by painting nude portraits of the wives of the aristocracy), Etty appears to have taken at least some of Myers's suggestions seriously.

=== Illness and recovery ===
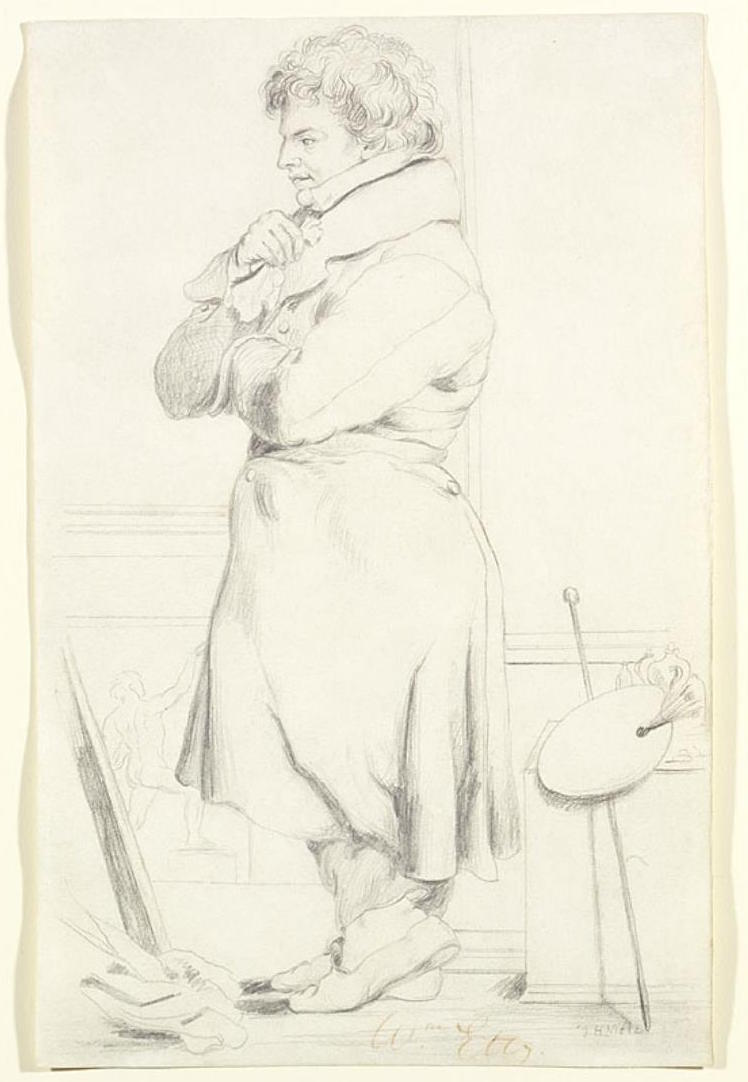
William Etty in his Studio, John Henry Mole, 1834

In mid-1833 Etty began a portrait of the daughters of Charles Watkin Williams-Wynn, the long-serving Conservative Member of Parliament for Montgomeryshire, titled Preparing for a Fancy Dress Ball. Etty was then little-known for portraits, but had recently completed Elizabeth Potts, a portrait of the daughter of a family friend, which although poorly received by some critics was technically highly accomplished. (Note: Elizabeth Potts is listed in catalogues from the time simply as A Portrait, as the Potts family wished to preserve the subject's anonymity.) He said at the time that he hoped his portrait of the Williams-Wynn children would be "one of my best".

In February 1834, Etty became seriously ill, and was incapacitated for four months. (Note: It is not certain what illness Etty suffered in 1834. He described his symptoms as "I feel scarce the strength of a kitten. A severe cough, sore throat, hoarseness, low fever, and soreness all over".) Unable to paint, he exhibited only two already-completed paintings in the 1834 Summer Exhibition, Elizabeth Potts and The Cardinal. In June of that year he left London to convalesce, renting a cottage in York. Weak and unable to concentrate, Etty painted very little, and spent the next few months visiting friends and touring the sights of Yorkshire. Gradually regaining his health, he returned to London in December 1834, and resumed work on those paintings he had left incomplete on the onset of his illness.

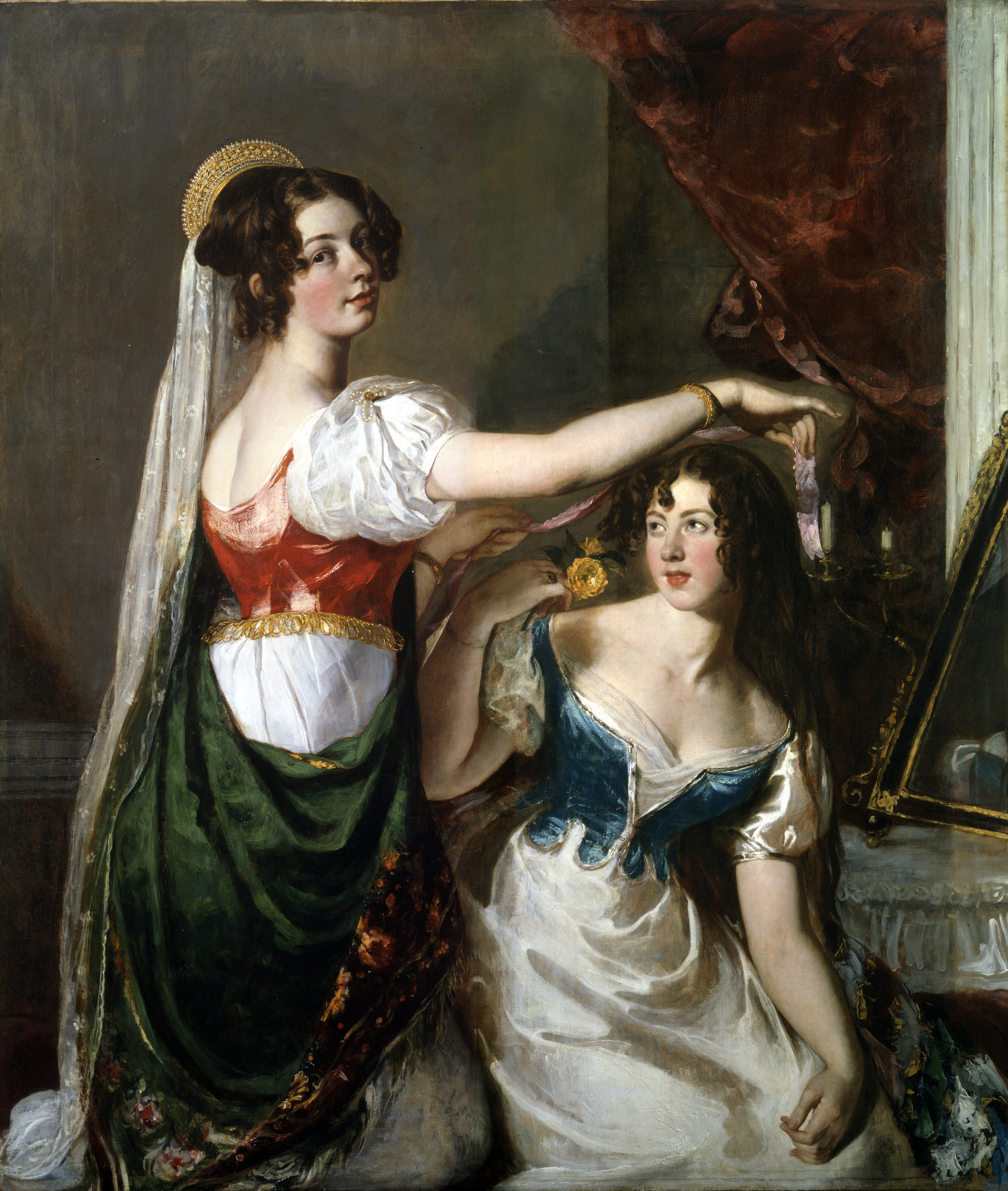
Preparing for a Fancy Dress Ball (1835)

Making up for lost time during illness, he completed several significant works over the next few months, and exhibited eight paintings at the 1835 Summer Exhibition. (Note: The Bridge of Sighs, Phaedria and Cymochles on the Idle Lake, Preparing for a Fancy Dress Ball, Study from a Young Lady: A York Beauty, Study of the Head of a Youth, Venus and Her Satellites, The Warrior Arming and Wood Nymphs Sleeping: Satyr Bringing Flowers.) These included works now considered among his most significant. The Bridge of Sighs, Venice was based on sketches made by Etty during his visit to that city in the early 1820s. It shows the aftermath of an execution, as two men haul the body away to be thrown into the sea; it was described as "poetry on canvas" by William Macready, who bought it from Etty. Preparing for a Fancy Dress Ball was the portrait of the daughters of Charles Watkin Williams-Wynn which Etty had begun in 1833. Etty had put far more work into this than was usual for a portrait, remarking to the Williams-Wynn family that he intended "to make a fine work of Art as well as a resemblance". Showing Williams-Wynn's daughters Charlotte and Mary in elaborate Italian-style costumes, it was critically well received as evidence that Etty was able to paint a major work that did not rely on nudity, as well as demonstrating that Etty could paint on commission for the elite, leading to further commissions. The Warrior Arming was a study of Godfrey de Bouillon, painted to satisfy the then-current fad for medievalism. Etty had recently developed an interest in collecting pieces of armour, and The Warrior Arming is a technically adept study of the effects of lights from multiple sources shining on polished armour.

The most contentious of Etty's 1835 RA exhibits was Venus and Her Satellites, a depiction of the Toilet of Venus. This was condemned in much of the press as pornographic, and was described as having a "total absence of soul", with The Observer in particular extremely hostile, calling for the Archbishop of Canterbury to become involved in chastising Etty for his lack of taste. Despite this condemnation, Etty considered Venus and her Satellites one of his best works, and sold it to Rev. Edward Pryce Owen for the substantial sum of 300 guineas (about £35,000 in 2025 terms) in August.

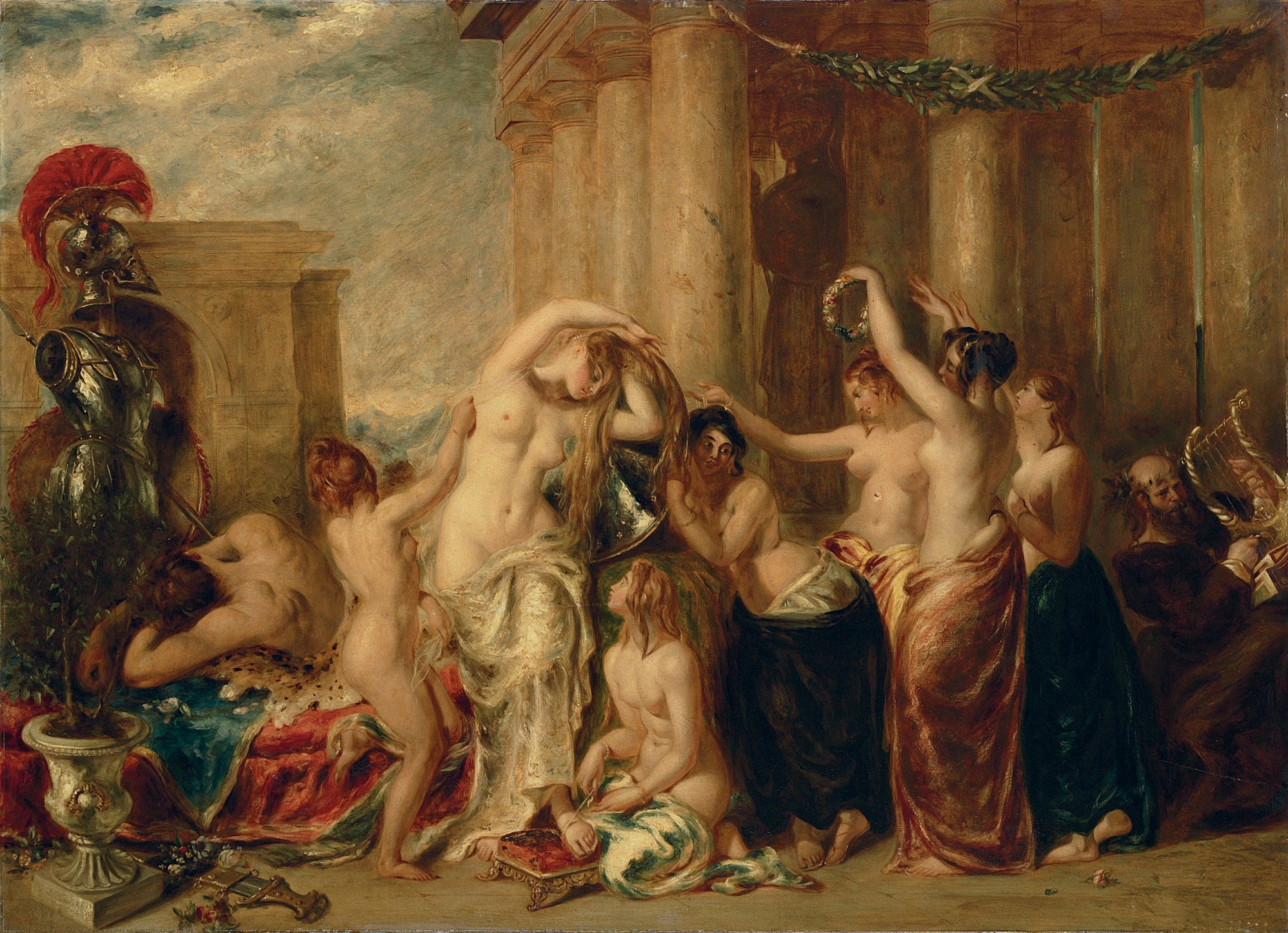
Venus and Her Satellites (1835)

We must, indeed, be more serious with this gentleman [Etty] than is our wont, for the "Society for the Suppression of Vice" are not to be excused for their prosecutions in cases of obscene publications, and the Lord Mayor himself deserves at once to be sent to the tread-mill for imprisoning a little Italian boy for hawking about the streets a naked Cupid, if such lascivious scenes, such gross insults to morality and decency, are allowed to be exhibited at the Roy. Acad. with impunity. A Brothel on fire, which had driven all the Paphian Nymphs out from their beds into the court-yard, would be a modest exhibition compared to this—for they would at least exhibit en chemise. Several ladies, we know, were deterred from going into this corner of the room to see Leslie's, Webster's, and other pictures of great merit there, to avoid the offence and disgrace Mr. E. has conferred on that quarter ... Really, really, if Mr. E., with all his power of colour, turn his drawings of the human figure to no honester purpose—if the absence of all taste and decency is to mark his Academical studies, it is high time that he had a hint from an authority which neither he nor the Council of the Academy will dare to treat slightly. The Archbishop of Canterbury and some of our Bishops are fond of the arts—what say they to them in this shape?

— The Observer on Venus and Her Satellites, 10 May 1835.

In August 1835 Etty spent a brief holiday in Shropshire, where he delivered Venus and Her Satellites to Owen. While en route back he made a detour to Manchester to visit an art exhibition; while there he made the acquaintance of wealthy cotton merchant Daniel Grant.

=== Etty and York ===
After Jonathan Martin's arson attack on York Minster in 1829 caused major damage, there were proposals by the dean and chapter to take the opportunity of the destruction to restructure the interior of the building. Etty was prominent in the effort to resist the redesign and to restore the building to its original state. A campaign led by Etty and other notable York residents was successful, and the plans were eventually defeated in February 1831. (Note: The plan was proposed by Robert Smirke, and involved taking the opportunity provided by the fire to reposition the rood screen and move the organ into the side aisles, making the Great East Window (one of the most important medieval stained glass works) more visible from within the building.)

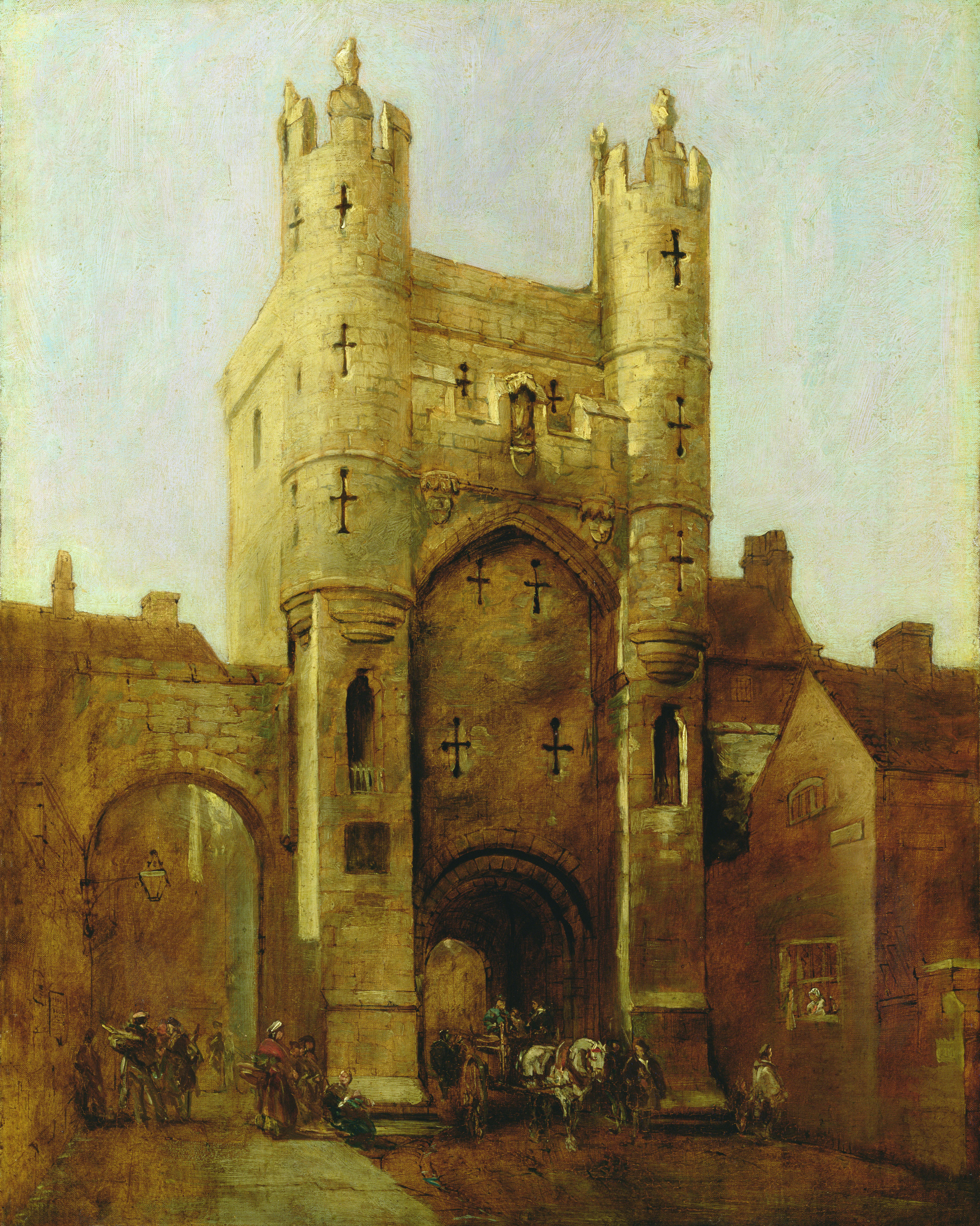
Monk Bar, York (1838)

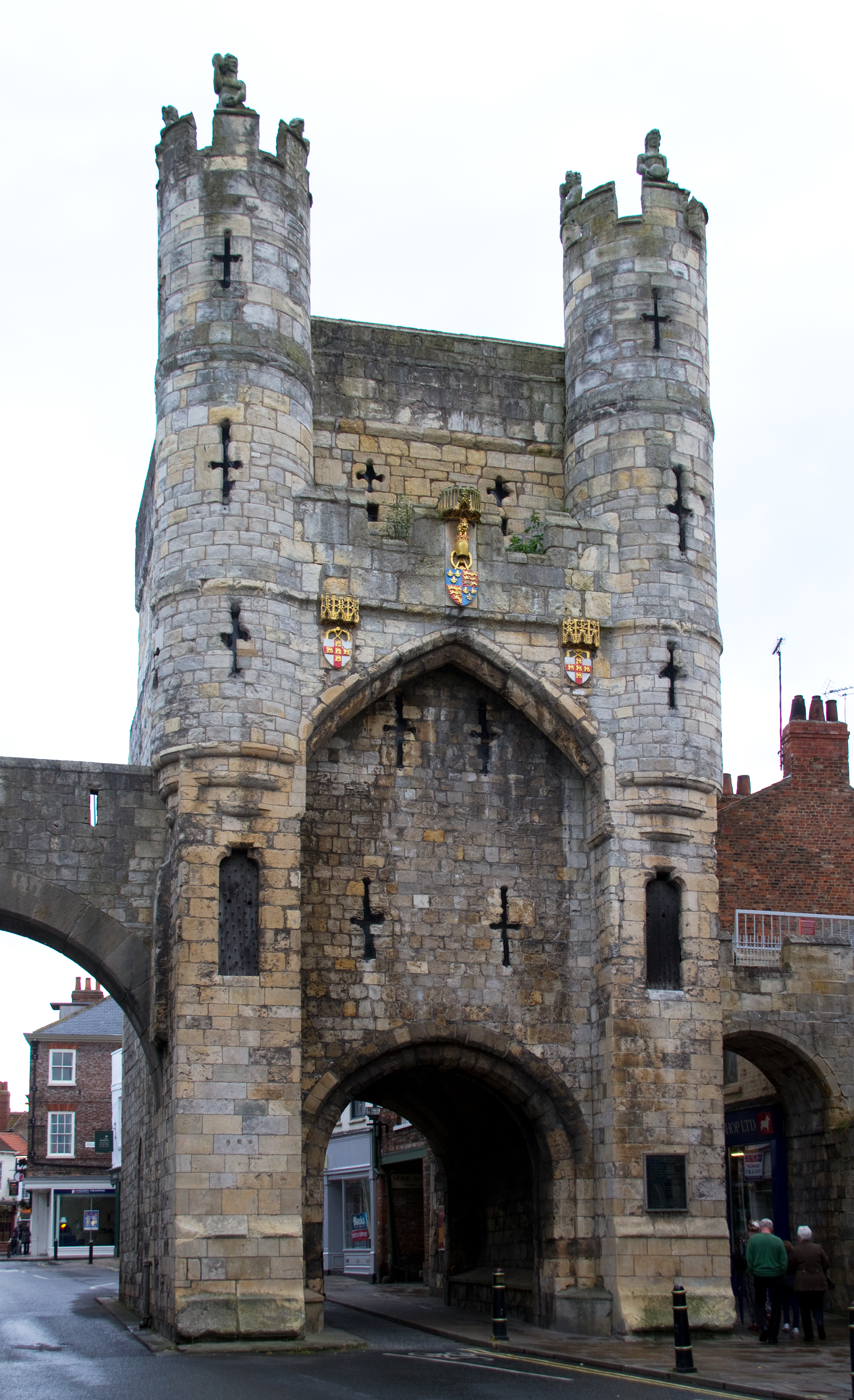
Monk Bar in 2012

The successful campaign to preserve York's city walls means that Monk Bar, as painted by Etty in 1838, (Note: The York Art Gallery dates Etty's Monk Bar, York to 1832. Both of Etty's recent biographers, Dennis Farr in 1958 and Leonard Robinson in 2007, date all four of Etty's paintings of the York Bars to c. 1838.) remains virtually unchanged.

By the time of the Minster fire, the Corporation of York (the body responsible for local government) was already engaged in a debate about the future of the city's defensive walls. The walls no longer served any practical purpose and were expensive to maintain, and with the population of the city rising rapidly the city was becoming cramped and dangerous. The city gates ("Bars") had become a public health hazard given the number of locals using them as toilets, and theft of stone for other building works had left parts of the walls dangerously unstable. The Bars restricted stagecoaches, meaning York was unable to capitalise on its strategic position halfway along the lucrative London–Edinburgh route. Faced with the need to clear the city's slums, in 1800 the Corporation sought permission from Parliament to demolish the Bars and much of the walls. Owing to opposition from York Minster the scheme was abandoned, but by 1826 the barbicans of four of the gates had been demolished. In the face of this a public campaign to save the walls was launched in 1824, but attention on both sides of the debate was diverted by the Minster fire. In 1828 Etty had written to his mother expressing horror at the demolition proposals, but distracted by the need to complete Sleeping Nymph and Satyrs was unable to take any action himself. By 1831 the Corporation had decided to demolish the barbicans but to retain and restore the walls.

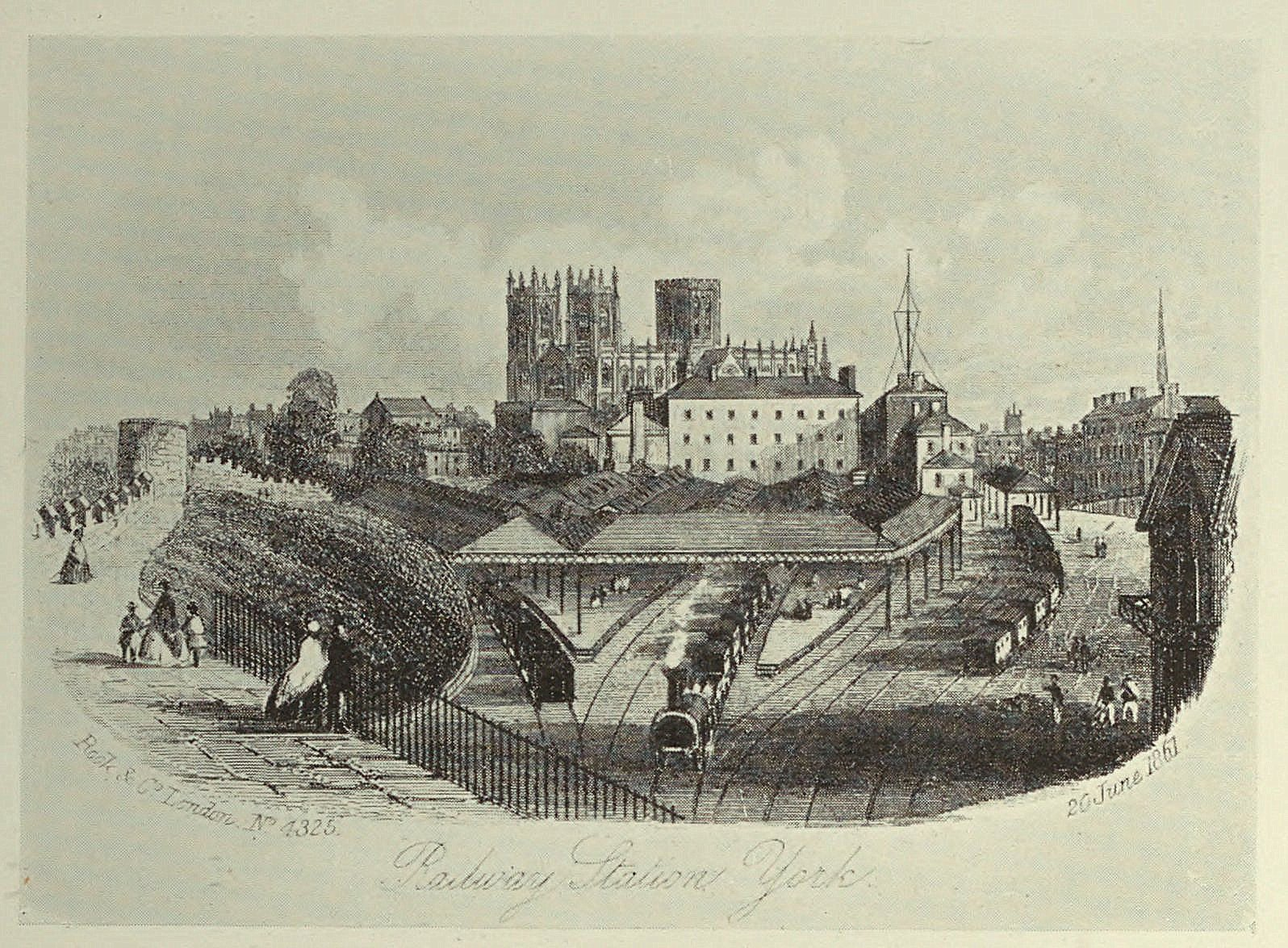
Railway lines entering York station through the city walls, 1861. The cutting of an arch in the walls, and the noise and smoke of trains so close to York Minster, distressed Etty.

In February 1832 Etty began a campaign of writing to local York newspapers urging the preservation of the walls, and sending donations to various campaigns associated with their retention. Although some local newspapers were now supporting preservation in light of the damage their demolition would do to the tourist trade, many locals—whose lives were made more difficult by living in a walled city with few points of entry—remained hostile to the preservation campaigns. A proposal in 1838 by the York and North Midland Railway to cut an archway through the walls to allow access to a railway station within the walls galvanised Etty, and he delivered two lectures on the preservation of the walls during visits to York in 1838–39, and made four paintings of the Bars. Etty's words went unheeded and the archway was duly cut in the walls, much to his dismay, although the station was soon moved to its current location outside the walls to allow through the running of trains to both north and south. While the walls were eventually saved in 1889, many years after Etty's death, Etty is sometimes credited with their salvation. It is open to debate how significant his part was. Some authors feel that his interventions had no impact and the preservation of the walls was the result of decisions made by the Corporation and lobbying by local newspapers, while others feel that the Corporation would not have made these decisions had Etty and other like-minded dignitaries not put pressure on them to do so.

In 1838, Etty started lobbying for the establishment of an art school in York. He proposed that the Hospitium of St Mary's Abbey be used for this purpose, with the lower floor becoming a museum of sculpture and the upper floor becoming a school and exhibition hall. The Hospitium scheme was abandoned, but the York School of Design duly opened on a different site in 1842. Although the school was created by an artist who had built his reputation on nudes, nude art remained controversial. In 1847, following a complaint from a female student about a display of replicas of Ancient Greek sculptures, "the master was requested to have the penis of each of the offending statues cut off [...] a proceeding that called forth the indignation of the male students and the remonstrances of even the lady students".

== Later life (1836–1849) ==
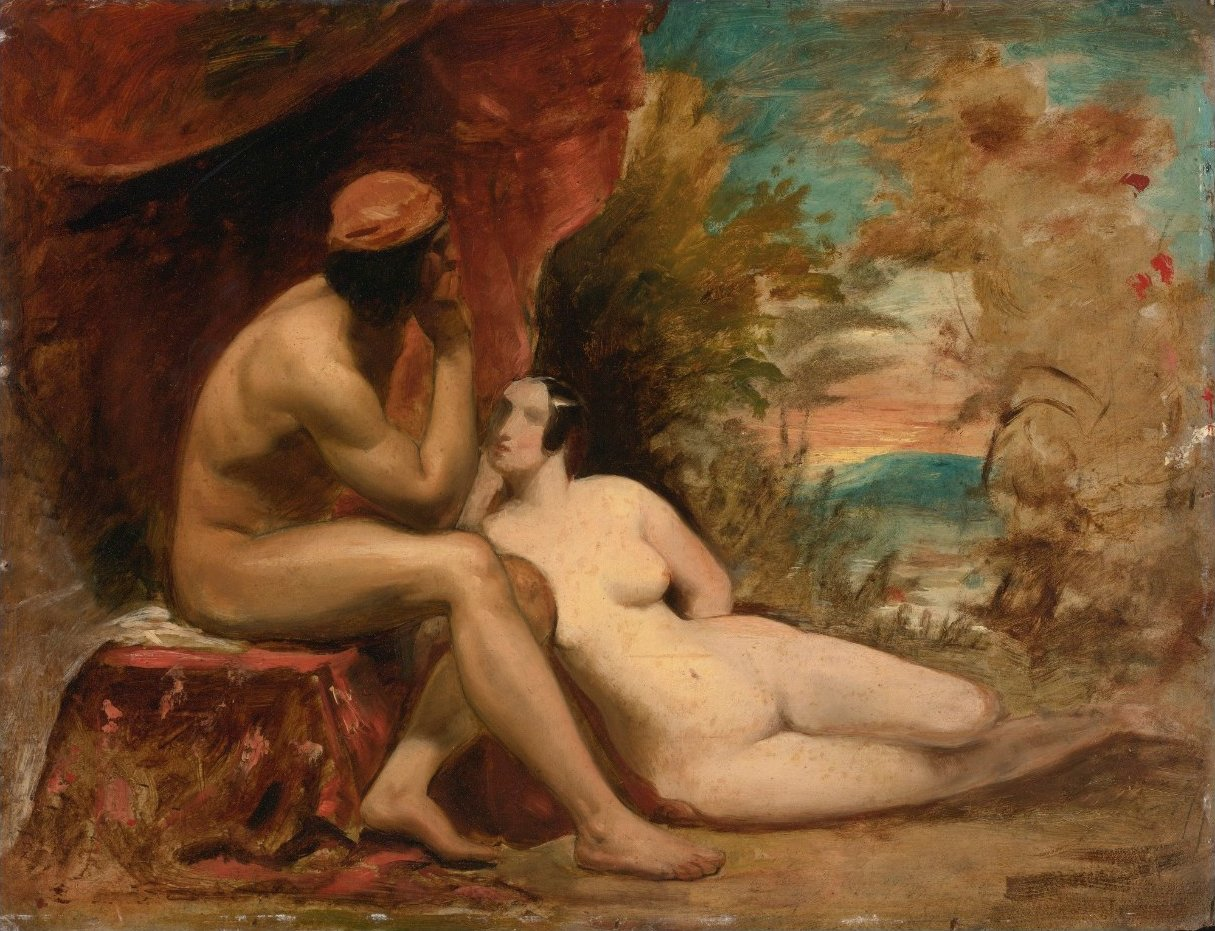
Early oil study

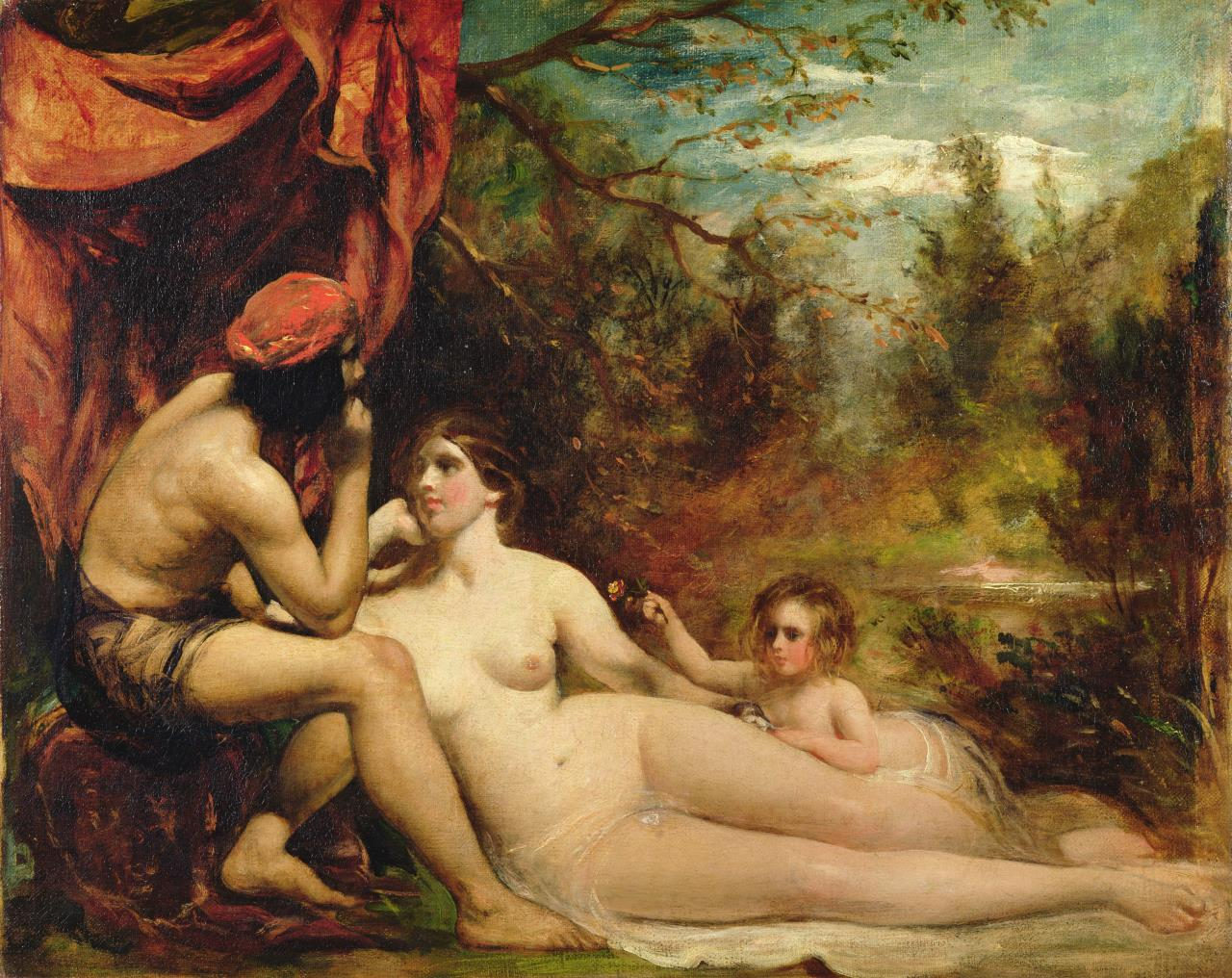
A Family of the Forest

Preliminary study and completed version of A Family of the Forest (1836).

In 1836 architect John Harper arranged a small exhibition in York of works by modern artists, which included 11 Etty paintings. This included the first public showing of Venus and her Doves, which had been commissioned by Daniel Grant. Although the exhibition broke even it met with little public interest, and no further Etty retrospectives were held for some years. Harper did take the opportunity to buy Etty's A Family of the Forest (also known as Flowers of the Forest), which had failed to sell at the 1836 Summer Exhibition. A Family of the Forest illustrates a passage from the Ancient Greek poem Theogony, dealing with the Golden Age before humanity suffered pain, misery or the need to work. The setting sun in the background and the man looking away from the woman and child, and instead into the distance, signify his knowledge that his days of ease are coming to an end.

By this time, Etty was becoming conflicted religiously. Although he had been raised as a Methodist, following Catholic emancipation in 1829 Etty became increasingly drawn to Catholicism. Although he considered himself "in [my] heart's core deeply and sincerely of the Ancient Faith", he refused formally to convert to Catholicism owing to concerns that it would upset his family and friends, worries that he would be denied access to Anglican buildings such as York Minster, and a distaste for the concept of auricular (spoken) confession. He remained closely associated with Catholicism throughout his later life, and was one of the few non-Catholics to attend the 1838 opening of Augustus Pugin's chapel for St Mary's College, Oscott, at the time the most important Catholic building in England.

=== The Sirens and Ulysses ===
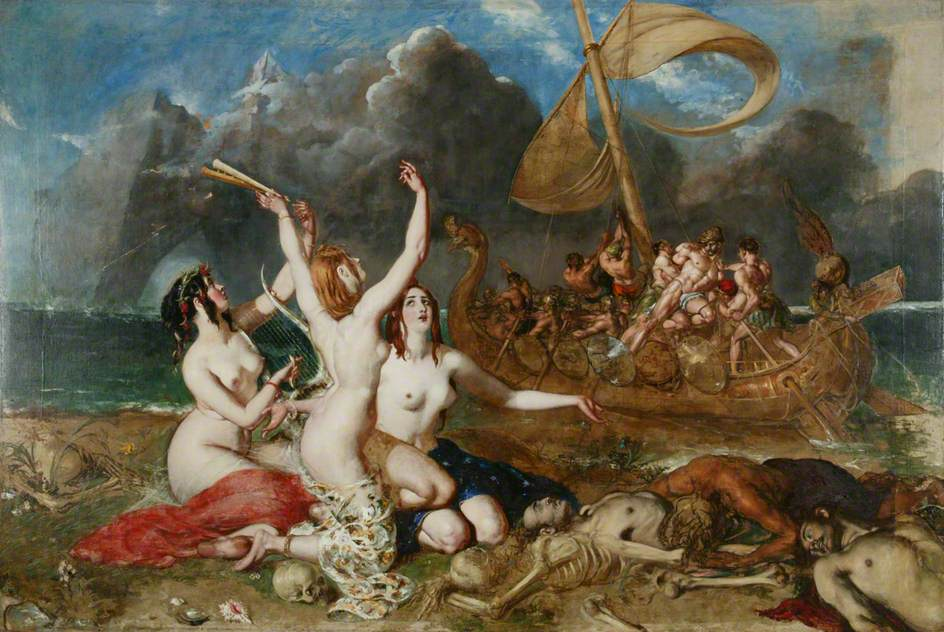
The Sirens and Ulysses (1837, restored 2010)

Also in 1836 Etty began work on The Sirens and Ulysses, which he considered among his greatest works, and which is his largest surviving painting. Measuring 442.5 cm by 297 cm (14 ft 6 in by 9 ft 9 in) Sirens was based on a passage from Homer's Odyssey in which sailors resist the irresistible song of the Sirens. The theme and scale of the painting were probably suggested to Etty by Thomas Myers, who had been encouraging Etty to paint very large canvases. Myers's suggested theme appealed to Etty, who later wrote that it illustrated "the importance of resisting Sensual Delights". Etty made every effort to ensure realism in the picture, going as far as to visit mortuaries to sketch corpses in varying stages of decay to ensure the accuracy of the cadavers on the beach.

When Etty completed Sirens in 1837, it was one of the main attractions at the 1837 Summer Exhibition, the first to be held in the Royal Academy's new building in Trafalgar Square (now part of the National Gallery). The painting, with its juxtaposition of male and female nudity and decaying corpses, immediately divided opinion. Some critics considered it one of the finest artworks ever made, with The Gentleman's Magazine particularly taken with the work, describing Sirens as "a historical work of the first class" and "by far the best that Mr. Etty ever painted". Other critics were less kind; The Spectator considered it "a disgusting combination of voluptuousness and loathsome putridity—glowing in colour and wonderful in execution, but conceived in the worst possible taste".

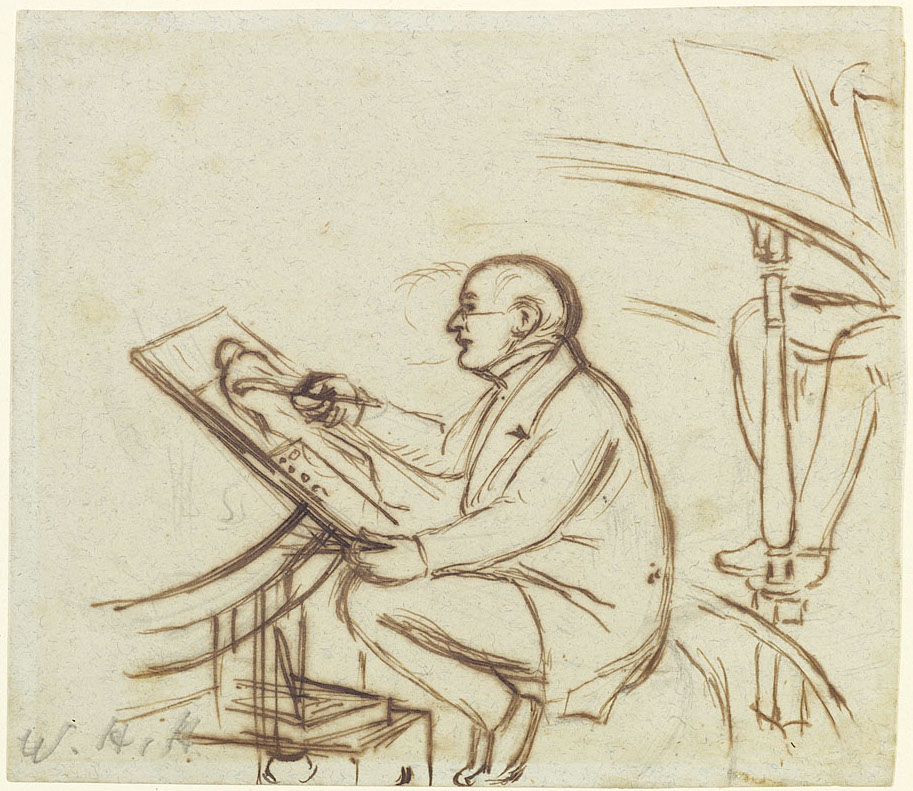
William Etty at the Life Class, William Holman Hunt, 1840s

Possibly because of its size, The Sirens and Ulysses failed to sell at the Summer Exhibition. In October 1837 Etty met again with Daniel Grant who, without having seen the painting, offered £250 (about £24,000 in today's terms) for Sirens and for Samson and Delilah, also exhibited by Etty that year. Etty, poor at business and always reluctant to keep unsold paintings in his studio, sold both paintings to Grant for well below their true worth. (Note: Shortly after buying Sirens and Samson Grant died and left the paintings to his brother William, who in turn donated them to the Royal Manchester Institution in 1839.) Etty had used a strong glue as a paint stabiliser which flaked when dry, and as soon as it was complete Sirens began to deteriorate. It was shown at the 1857 Art Treasures Exhibition but then considered in too poor a condition for further public display, and placed in long-term storage in the archives of the Royal Manchester Institution and its successor, the Manchester Art Gallery. In 2006 restoration began on it, and in May 2010 Sirens was returned to public display and is now one of the key works in the Manchester Art Gallery.

=== Decline ===
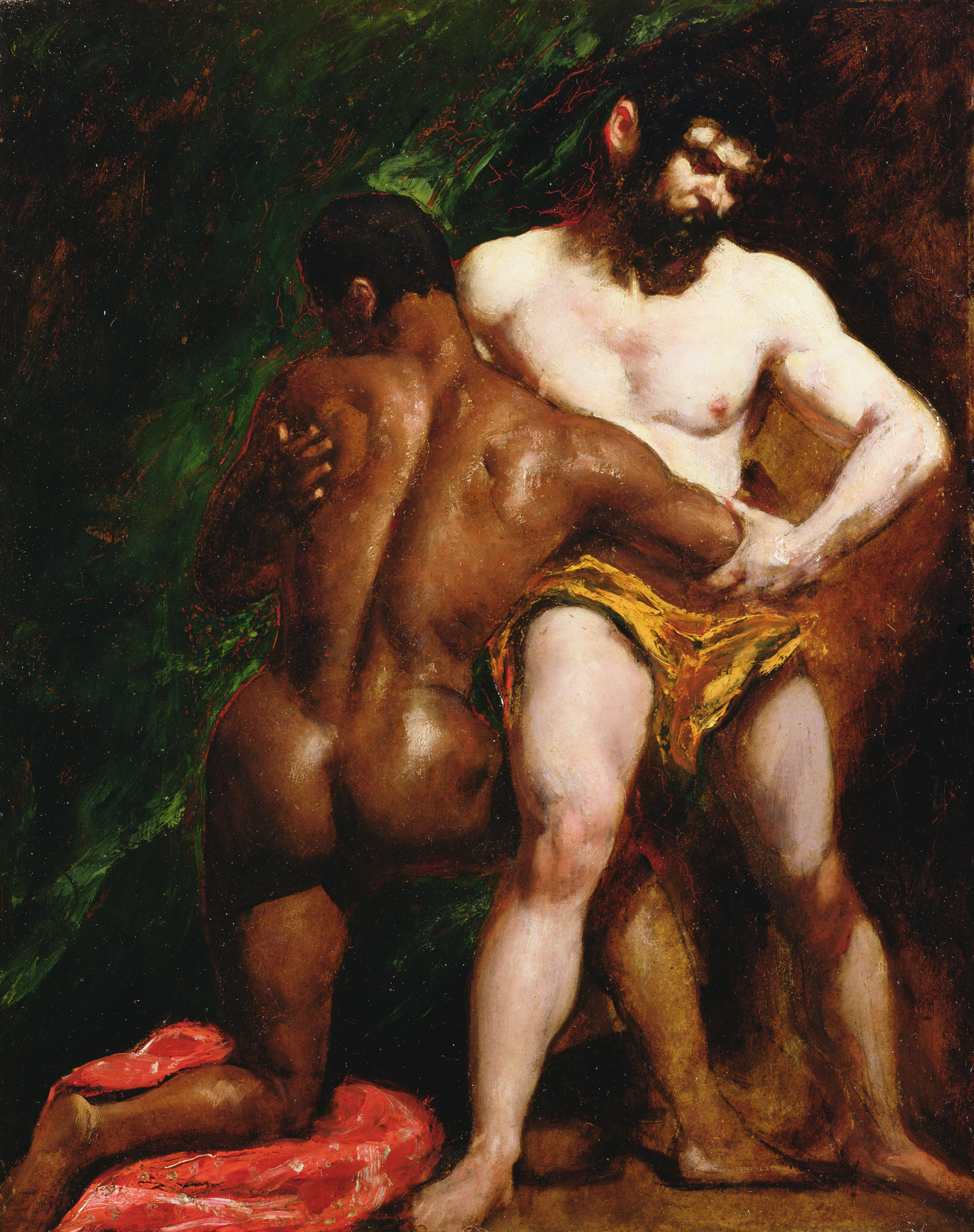
The Wrestlers (c. 1840). Even as a highly acclaimed artist in his 50s, Etty continued to attend life classes.

After Sirens, Etty's output remained as high as ever, with seven paintings exhibited at the 1838 Summer Exhibition, but the quality of his work is generally considered to have gone into decline. By 1838 critics began to comment that Etty's paintings were no longer inventive but simply reworkings of his earlier paintings, while in June of that year William Makepeace Thackeray (under the pen name of Michael Angelo Titmarsh) wrote that "[Etty] is, like great men, lazy, or indifferent, perhaps, about public approbation". By 1839, criticisms of Etty were being raised in even those newspapers and journals which had previously championed his work. A new type of criticism of Etty also began to appear in 1839, from a new generation led by The Art Union, who praised Etty's technical abilities but saw his choice of subjects as out of touch and anachronistic, and "very frequently doing as little good for mankind as the priest who preaches his sermon in Latin".

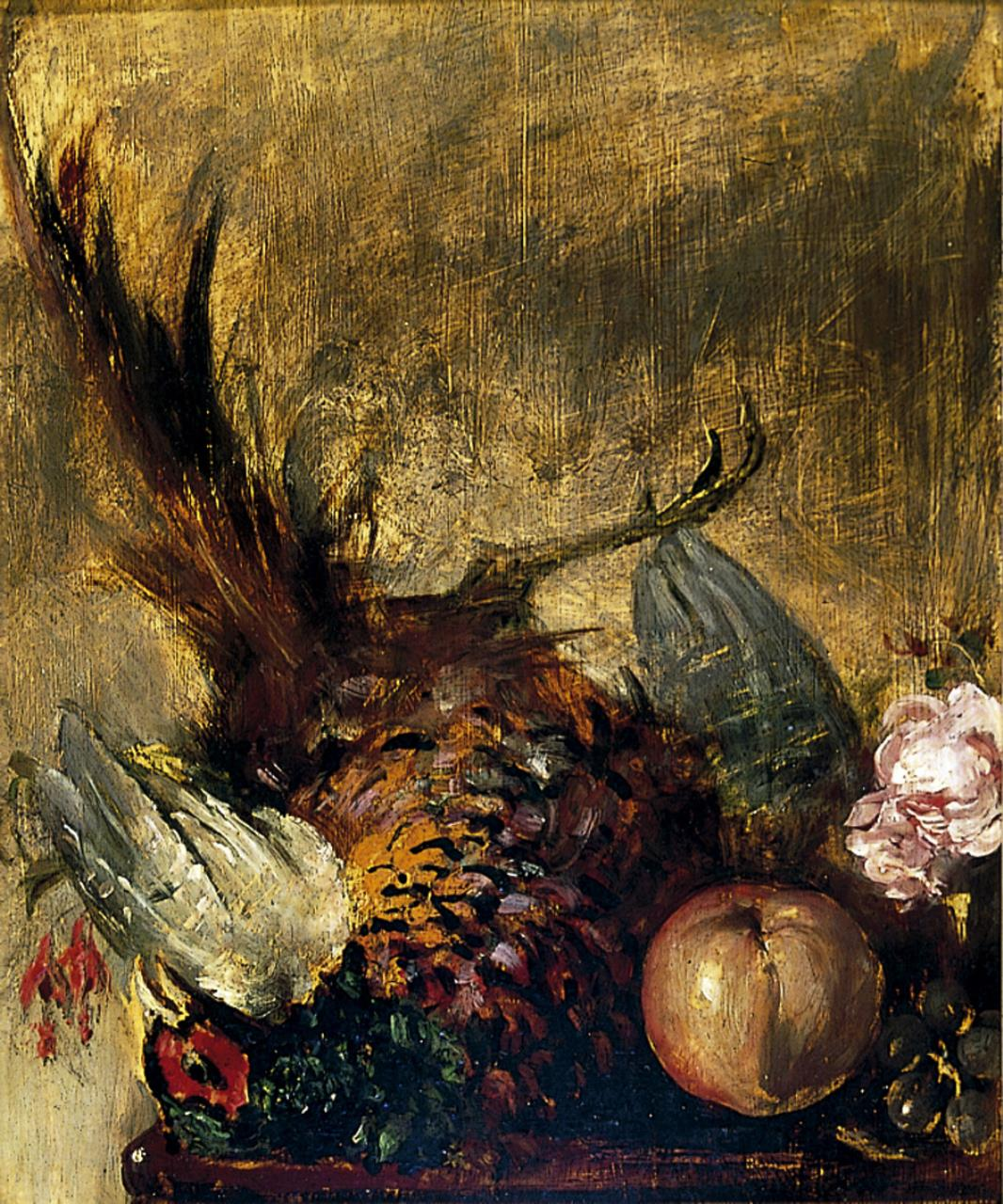
Dead Pheasant and Fruit (c. 1839)

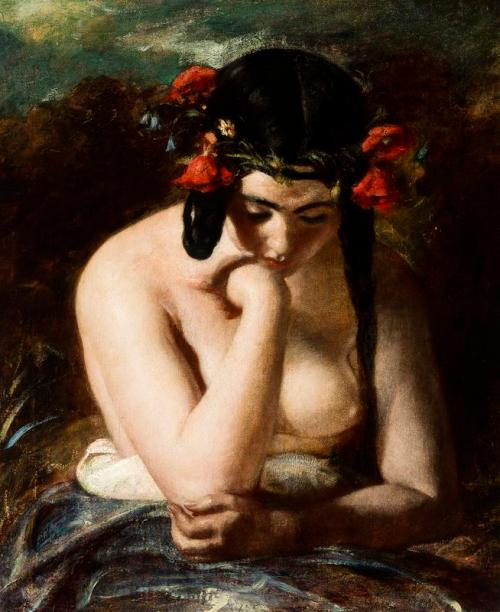
Somnolency (1838), Aberdeen Archives, Gallery & Museums

From around this time onwards, while Etty still held to his belief that the purpose of art is to illustrate moral lessons, he began to abandon the literary, religious and mythological themes which had dominated his work. He began to paint still lifes, beginning with Pheasant and Peach (likely to be the painting now called Dead Pheasant and Fruit); in the 1840s he exhibited six in total, and painted many more. Etty was the first English painter to paint significant still lifes, which at the time were thought by the English a primarily Netherlandish form. Also for the first time, he began to paint a significant number of landscape paintings. Etty still continued to paint history paintings, but while he continued to produce highly acclaimed reworkings of his previous pictures, those works on fresh topics were generally poorly received. Etty's decline in quality can possibly be attributed in part to London art dealers; from 1835 dealer Richard Colls had become increasingly close to Etty, and by 1844 had a near-monopoly on his work. As the importance of the landed gentry to the art market declined, the new purchasers of art were industrialists; generally lacking in a classical education and with little interest in Old Masters, they preferred to buy works by then-contemporary artists such as Etty, and relied on dealers to advise them.

In May 1840, Etty made the trip to Brussels and Antwerp which he had been forced by revolution to abandon in 1830. He intended to study the works of Rubens, but the briefness of his tour—in the company of Betsy Etty he visited Ostend, Bruges, Antwerp, Brussels, Aachen, Cologne, Bonn and Rotterdam in the course of ten days—meant he had little time for study. The following year he returned to Antwerp and Mechelen for a longer visit to visit St. Rumbold's Cathedral and to study the substantial collections of Rubens paintings in the two cities. On this second journey he twice visited a Trappist monastery outside Antwerp, staying overnight on one visit, and bought a Trappist habit; he also bought a Capuchin habit from a monastery in Bruges. These acquisitions prompted paintings on monastic themes over subsequent years.

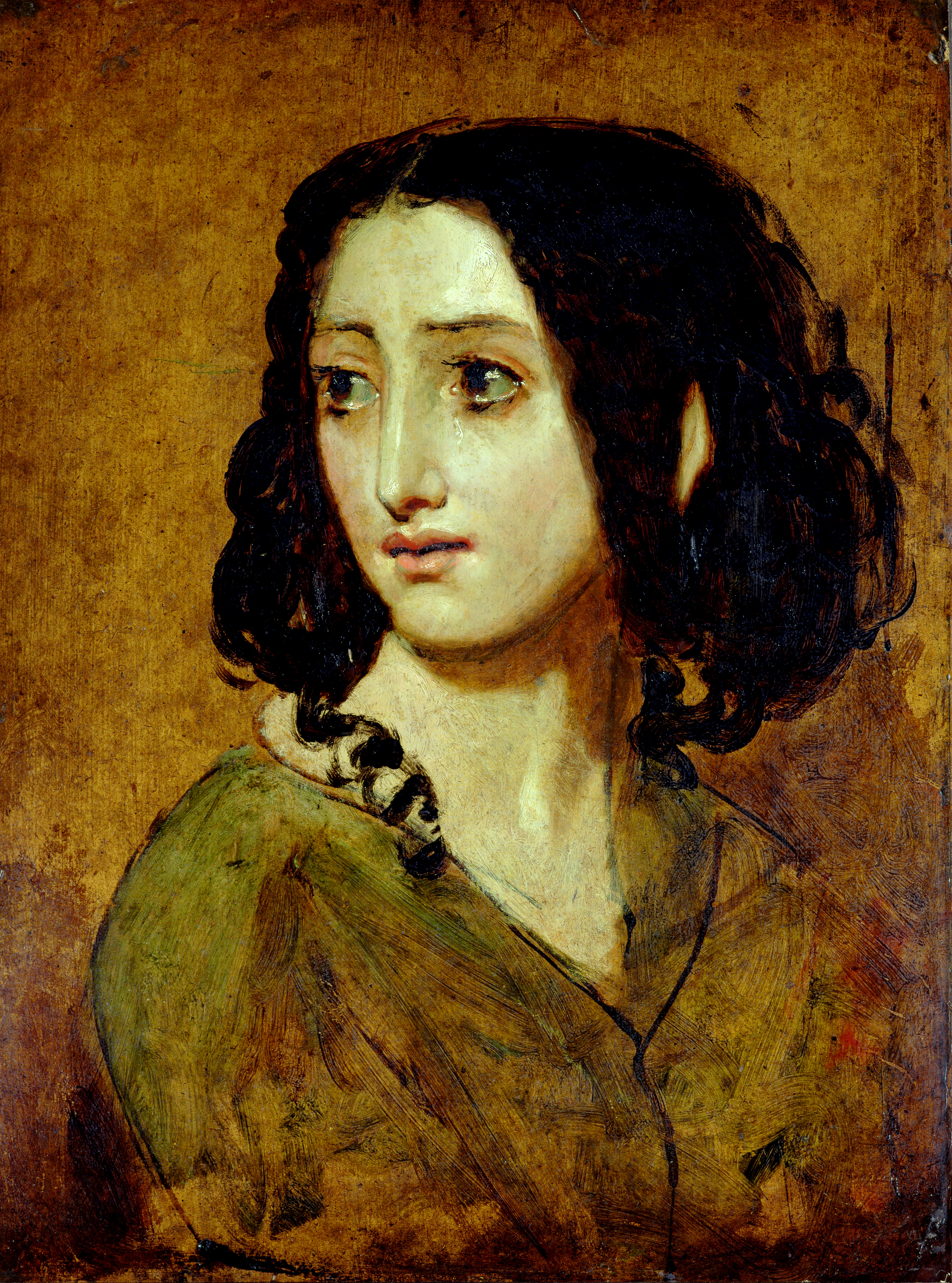
Portrait of Mlle Rachel (c. 1841) Etty probably met the celebrated French actress Madamoiselle Rachel through William Macready.

Despite a perceived decline in his work's quality, the 1840s were the most financially successful of Etty's career. His income increased with further opportunities for patronage from a growing industrial class, and with few costs and all his earlier debts cleared, Etty was in a position to invest money for the first time. By 1841 Etty had around £300 invested, rising to £8500 in 1845 and £17,000 in 1849. (Note: In modern terms, Etty's savings roughly equate to £27,000 in 1841, £890,000 in 1845, and £1,900,000 at the time of his death in November 1849.) He continued to have difficulty forming relationships with any woman other than Betsy Etty, writing in his diary in 1843 that "being in sound Mind and Body I declare it to be my Firm Intention NEVER TO MARRY. In which resolution I pray GOD to help me that I may devote myself purely to my Art, my Country, and my GOD!"

In May 1843, Etty was one of eight artists chosen by Prince Albert to paint frescoes on the theme of Milton's Comus for a new pavilion being built in the grounds of Buckingham Palace. Etty was unhappy with his selection, as fresco was a medium with which he had no experience, but reluctantly did so, choosing to paint on the theme of Circe and the Sirens Three. The result was a disaster. Etty found himself unable to retouch or alter his existing work, as any freshly applied paint would flake away from the existing paint layer, and the lunette shape of the panel left Etty with a large empty space above the central figures. Etty's fresco was deemed unsalvageable, and although he offered to paint a replacement on the theme of Hesperus he was rejected, and William Dyce was commissioned to paint a replacement fresco. Etty was paid only a token £40 fee.

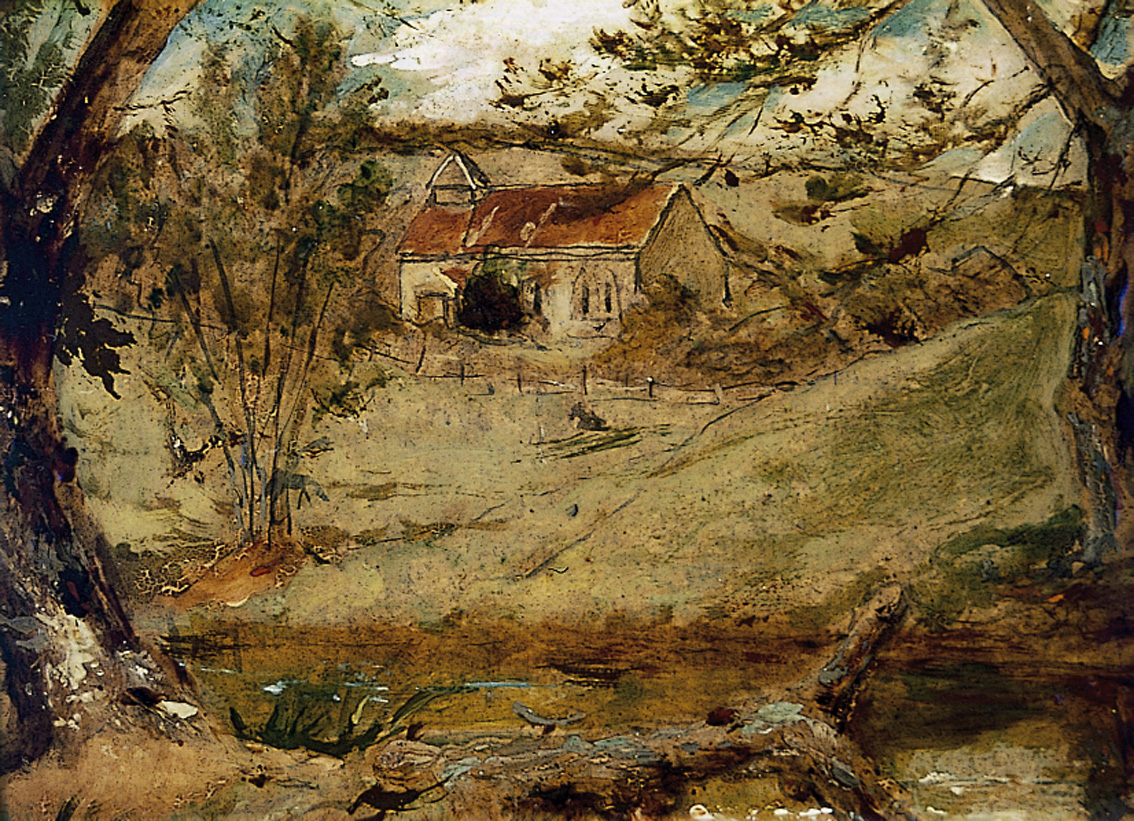
Givendale Church (1843). In the 1840s, Etty began painting landscapes for the first time.

The perceived lack of respect shown to one of England's leading artists led to some outcry, and attacks in the press upon the then very unpopular Albert; William Makepeace Thackeray wrote in 1845: "Think of the greatest patronage in the world giving forty pounds for pictures worth four hundred—condescending to buy works from humble men who could not refuse, and paying for them below their value! Think of august powers and principalities ordering the works of such a great artist as Etty to be hacked out of the palace-wall! That was a slap in the face to every artist in England."

In August 1843, during a break from his work on the fresco, Etty made what was to prove his final overseas journey. Since 1839 he had been planning a series of monumental paintings of Joan of Arc, and he wanted to visit places associated with her. Setting out on 16 August he spent two weeks touring sites in Rouen, Paris and Orléans associated with her life. Unlike Etty's disastrous prior visits to France, this journey passed without incident, and he found that he actually was coming to enjoy certain aspects of French living.

==== Musidora and Joan of Arc ====
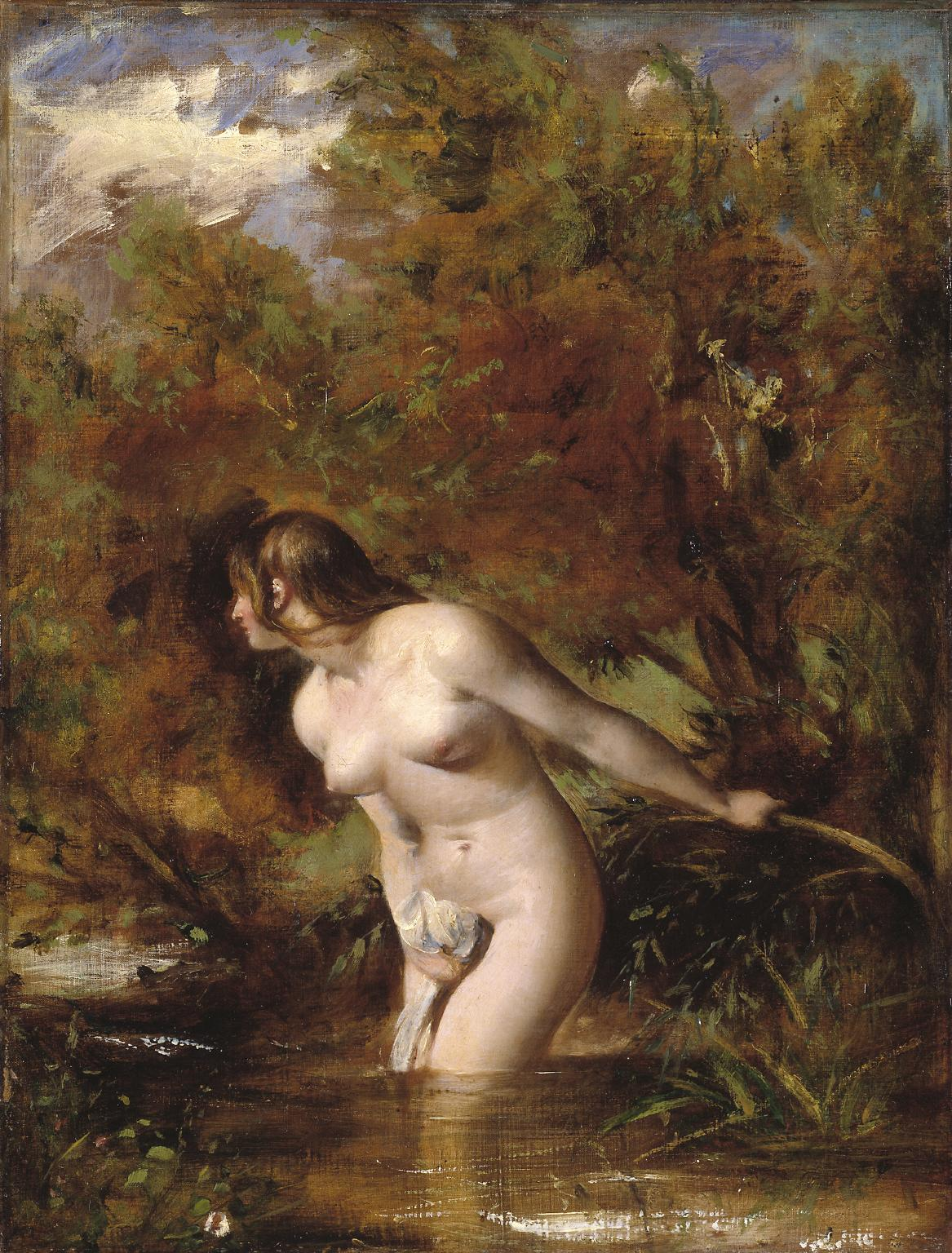
Musidora: The Bather 'At the Doubtful Breeze Alarmed' (1843, this version painted 1844, exhibited 1846) was arguably Etty's last significant history painting.

In the same year, Etty painted the first version of Musidora: The Bather 'At the Doubtful Breeze Alarmed', an illustration from the poem Summer by James Thomson and arguably Etty's last history painting painted while he still had all his powers. (Note: Four versions of Musidora exist, all identical in composition, although the landscape background varies slightly. One of the paintings is of poorer quality, and may be a later copy by a student. The best known version is that now in Tate Britain, painted in 1844 and probably first exhibited at the British Institution in 1846.) Musidora shows a scene in which the titular character, having removed the last of her clothes, steps into "the lucid coolness of the flood" to "bathe her fervent limbs in the refreshing stream", unknowing that she is being watched by her suitor Damon. Etty's composition is shown from the viewpoint of Damon; by so doing Etty aimed to induce the same reactions in the viewer as Damon's dilemma as described by Thomson; that of whether to enjoy the spectacle despite knowing it to be inappropriate, or to follow the accepted morality of the time and look away, in what art historian Sarah Burnage has described as "a titillating moral test for spectators to both enjoy and overcome". Musidora met with almost universal acclaim, compared favourably to Titian and Rembrandt, and described by The Critic as "a preeminent work" and "the triumph of the British school".

By the time Musidora was exhibited, Etty's health was in serious decline. Suffering severe asthma, it was not unusual for passers-by to accuse him of drunkenness as he made his way wheezing through the London streets, and he was beginning to plan his retirement from polluted London to his beloved York. Abandoning the smaller paintings which kept him profitable, he strived to complete his Joan of Arc triptych before his health gave out. This was on a huge scale, 28 ft (8.5 m) in total width and 9 ft 9 in (3 m) high; the three pictures from left to right depicted Joan devoting herself to the service of God and her country, Joan scattering the enemies of France, and Joan dying a martyr. (Note: Etty's full titles for the three Joan paintings were Joan of Arc, on finding the sword she had dreamt of, in the church of St. Catherine de Fierbois, devotes herself and it to the service of God and her country for the left panel, Joan of Arc makes a sortie from the gates of Orleans, and scatters the enemies of France for the central piece, and Joan of Arc, after rendering the most signal services to her Prince and people, is suffered to die a martyr in their cause for the right panel. The left hand panel is shown in Robinson 2007, p. 317.)

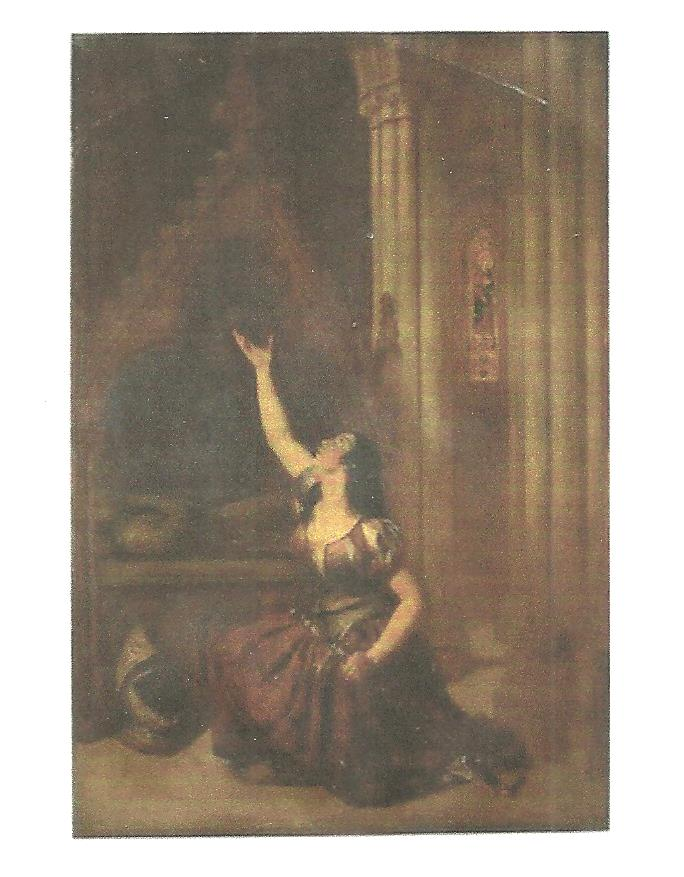
Joan of Arc, On finding in the church of St Catherine de Frébus the sword she dreamt of, devotes herself & it to the service of God & her country.

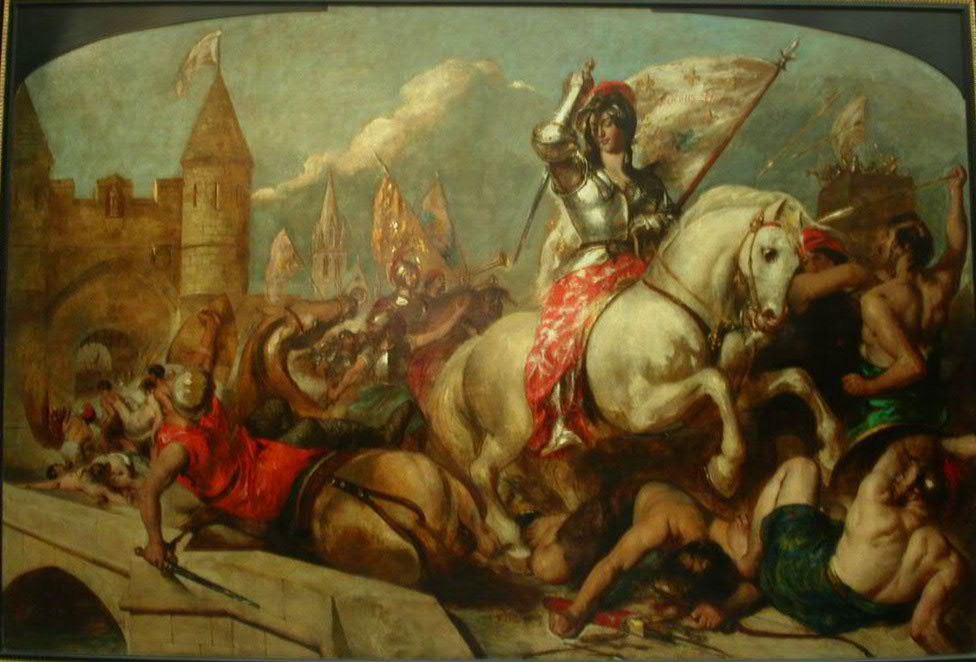
Joan of Arc makes a sortie from the gates of Orleans, and scatters the enemies of France

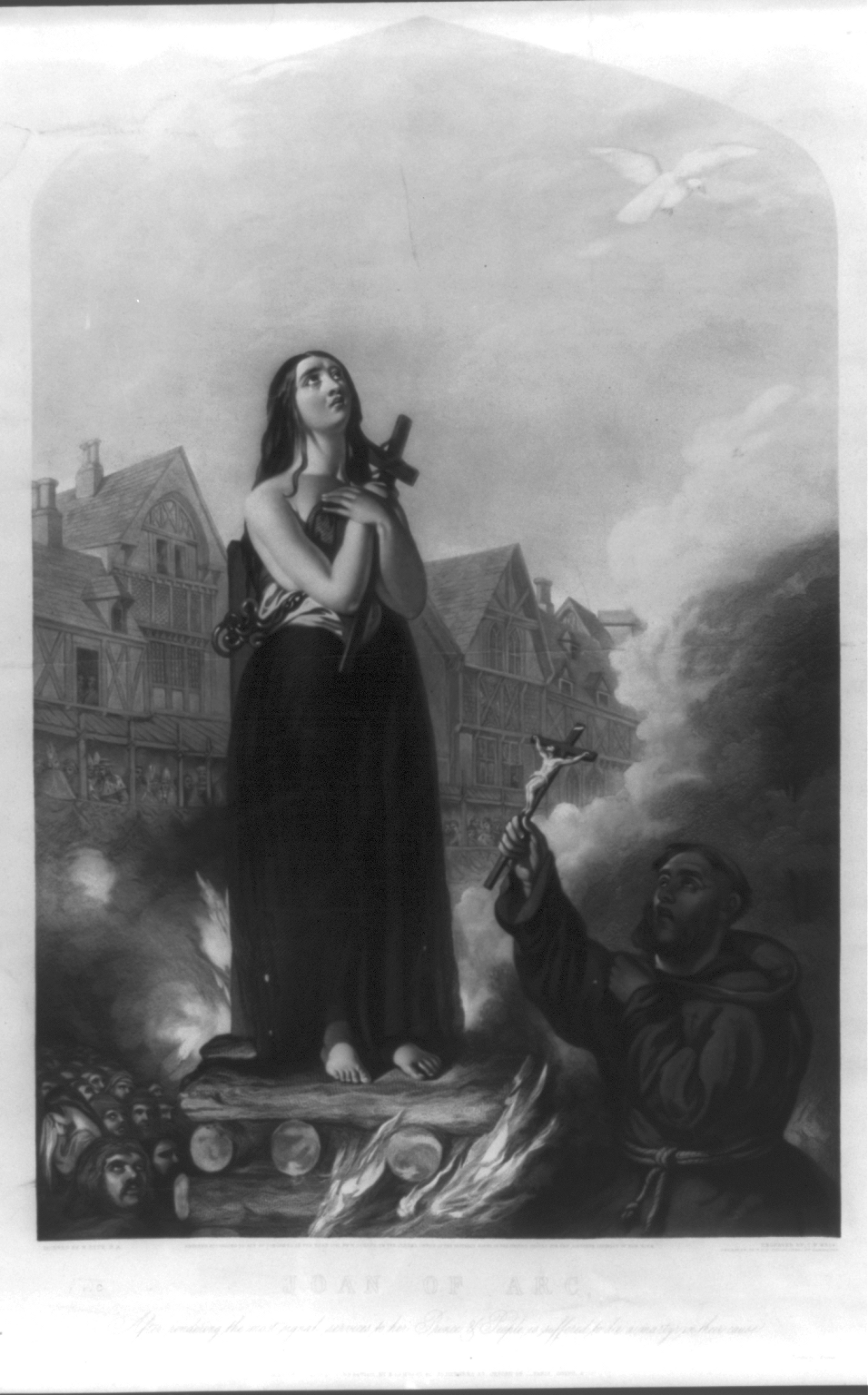
Joan of Arc, after rendering the most signal services to her Prince and people, is suffered to die a martyr in their cause". C.W Wass {another version is 1849 engraving of the third panel from "The Penny Illustrated News" December 1, 1849 Vol 1, Issue 6 .p. 45"

Etty sold the triptych for the huge sum of 2500 guineas (about £240,000 in 2025 terms) to dealer Richard Colls and the engraver C. W. Wass. Colls and Wass had ambitious plans to recoup their money by selling engravings of the pictures and by taking the paintings on a tour of Britain and Europe. The paintings proved less popular than expected. Very few engravings were sold and the tours did not take place; Wass declared bankruptcy in 1852. The paintings were separated, and sold on to a series of buyers, with the third panel fetching just 7 1/2 guineas in 1893 as Etty's popularity continued to wane. By the 1950s all three panels of Joan of Arc were believed lost or destroyed, although some preliminary studies survive. The first panel which showed Joan of Arc finding the sword in the church of St. Catherine de Fierbois ended up in the collection of Llantarnam Abbey, Cwmbran, South Wales [In 2021 the panel was sold at auction by Bonhams]. The second panel is in the collection of the Musée des Beaux-Arts d'Orléans. The third panel has since been lost.

=== Retrospective and death ===
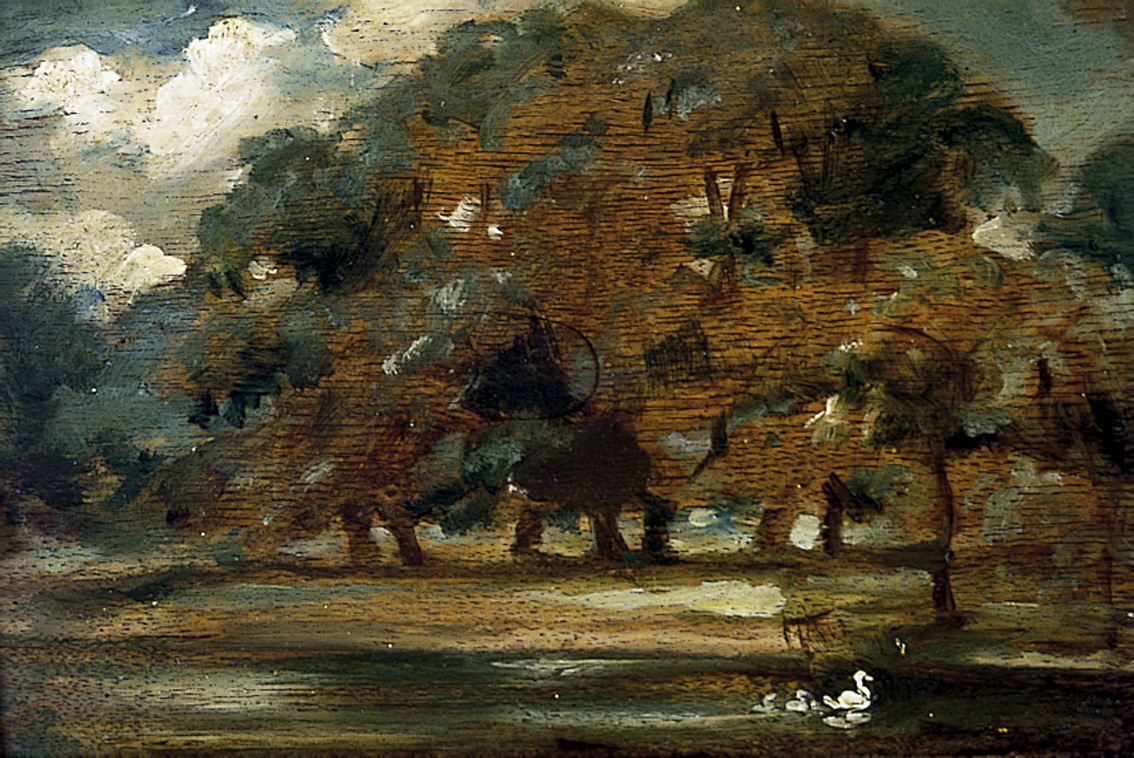
Fishponds, Givendale (1848)

Following the completion of Joan of Arc, Etty's health continued to deteriorate. He continued to paint and exhibit, but his retirement plans grew firmer. In April 1846 he bought a house in Coney Street, central York, as a retirement home, and in December 1847 he formally resigned from the Council of the Royal Academy. Following structural alterations to give him a better view of the river, Etty moved into the house in June 1848, completing the move in September, although he retained his London apartments. His move from London caused some consternation among that city's models, who were losing one of their most regular customers, as well as concerns from Etty who was worried that working with nude models might cause a scandal in York.

He continued to exhibit, sending seven paintings to that year's Summer Exhibition, but they drew little interest, although the lack of nudes was applauded by some reviewers. By this time, Robert Vernon's bequest of his collection to the nation had led to eleven Etty paintings going on public display in the cellars of the National Gallery. In late 1848 he wrote a brief autobiography, published the following year in The Art Journal, in which he staunchly defended himself against the accusations of pornography which had been levelled at him throughout his life:

As a worshipper of beauty, whether it be seen in a weed, a flower, or in that most interesting form to humanity, lovely woman, in intense admiration of it and its Almighty Author, if at any time I have forgotten the boundary line that I ought not to have passed, and tended to voluptuousness, I implore His pardon; I have never wished to seduce others from that path and practice of virtue, which alone leads to happiness here and hereafter; and if in any of my pictures an immoral sentiment has been aimed at, I consent it should be burnt; but I never recollect being actuated in painting my pictures by such sentiment. That the female form, in its fulness, beauty of colour, exquisite rotundity, may, by being portrayed in its nudity, awake like nature in some degree an approach to passion, I must allow, but where no immoral sentiment is intended, I affirm that the simple undisguised naked figure is innocent. "To the pure in heart all things are pure."

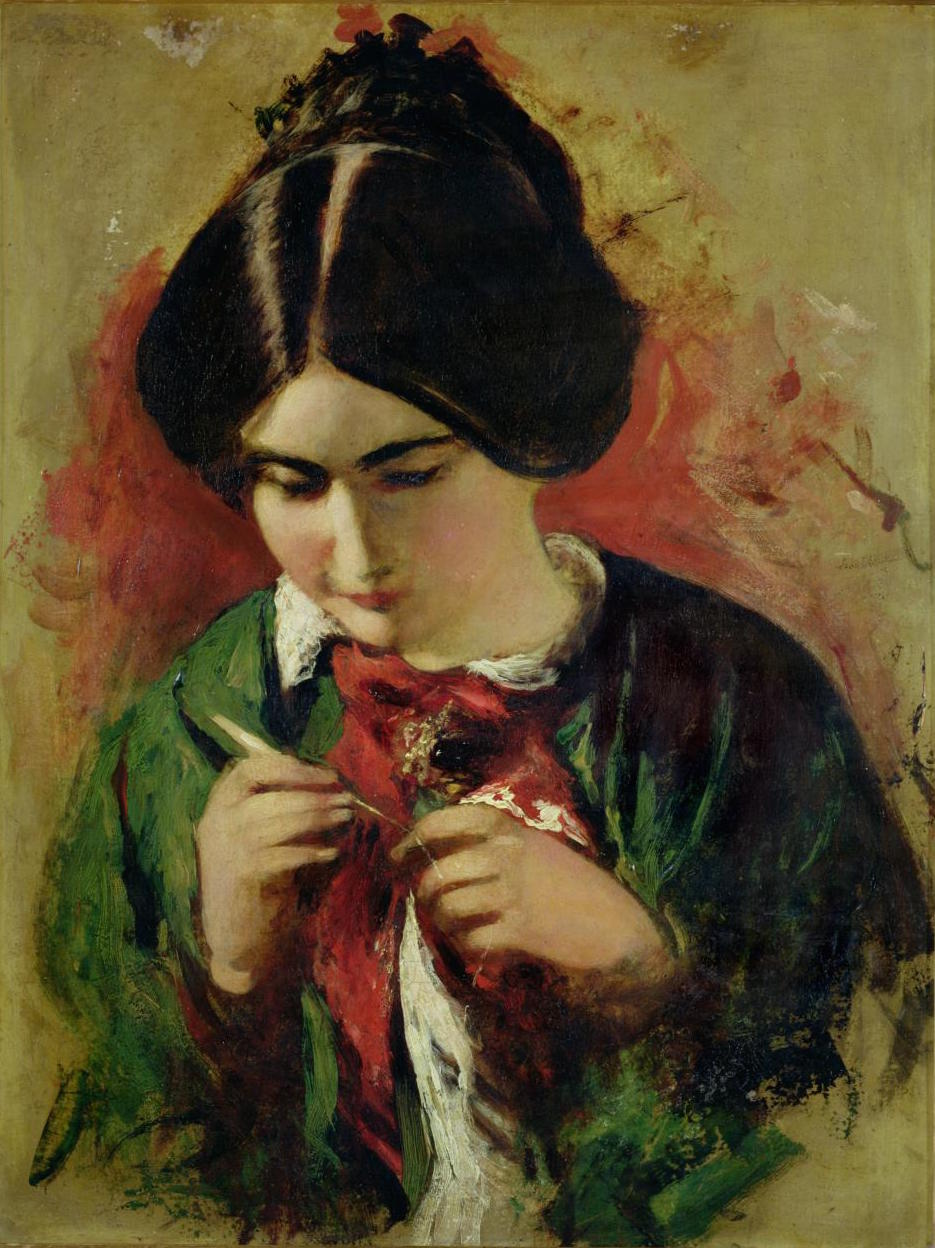
Study for The Crochet Worker (1849). The final work (now lost) was one of the last pieces completed by Etty and was exhibited in his final Summer Exhibition. It shows his great-niece Mary Ann Purdon.

In 1849, the Royal Society of Arts decided to organise a retrospective exhibition of Etty's work, the first since the minor York exhibition of 1836. Etty agreed only on condition that all nine of his large works were included. The three Joan of Arc paintings were in London and easily accessible, and the Royal Scottish Academy was happy to lend The Combat, Benaiah and the Judith triptych, but the Royal Manchester Institution was deeply reluctant to lend The Sirens and Ulysses in light of concerns that transporting it would damage the fragile paintwork further. They were eventually persuaded to lend the piece after Etty and some of his friends visited Manchester to personally request they release it. The exhibition went ahead from 9 June to 25 August 1849, bringing together 133 Etty paintings for the first time; Etty hoped that it would raise public awareness of his abilities, writing to his friend Rev. Isaac Spencer "Please God, I will give them a taste of my quality". The exhibition was well received and well attended; even Etty's old adversaries at the Morning Chronicle recommending that readers "lose no time in visiting this collection". It was a financial disaster for the Royal Society of Arts, faced with the cost of transporting large numbers of delicate artworks from around the country.

During the exhibition Etty suffered a serious bout of rheumatic fever. Exhausted by illness and the stress of the exhibition, when the exhibition was complete he returned to York in very poor health. On 3 November 1849 he suffered a serious asthma attack, thought to have been made worse by his neglecting to wear his flannel undershirt the night before. His condition deteriorated rapidly, and by 10 November he was bedridden. On Tuesday 13 November, watching the sun set over the River Ouse, he was heard to say "Wonderful! Wonderful! This death!" Later that night, Betsy Etty wrote to Joseph Gillott that "Uncle paid the last debt to nature at 1/4 past Eight oclock tonight. I do not know what to do. I am almost broken hearted. I have lost my best friend. I now [sic] not what to do. I can say no more."

== Legacy ==
Etty had planned for a burial in York Minster, but neglected to cover the necessary costs in his will. With Yorkshire local government in political and financial chaos in the wake of the bankruptcy of George Hudson, there was no political will to organise a public subscription or to waive the fees, and as a consequence Etty was buried in the churchyard of St Olave's Church, his local parish church. On 6 May 1850, the contents of his studio were auctioned, in a total of 1034 lots including around 900 paintings; some of these paintings were incomplete studies later completed by other artists to increase their value. In the years following his death Etty's work became highly collectable, his works fetching huge sums on resale. He continued to be regarded as a pornographer by some, with Charles Robert Leslie observing in 1850 "It cannot be doubted that the voluptuous treatment of his subjects, in very many instances, recommended them more powerfully than their admirable art; while we may fully believe that he himself, thinking and meaning no evil, was not aware of the manner in which his works were regarded by grosser minds".

Six months after William's death, Betsy Etty married chemist Stephen Binnington, a distant relation of the Etty family. She moved into his house in Haymarket, and some time after his death moved to 40 Edwardes Square, where she died in 1888 at the age of 87.

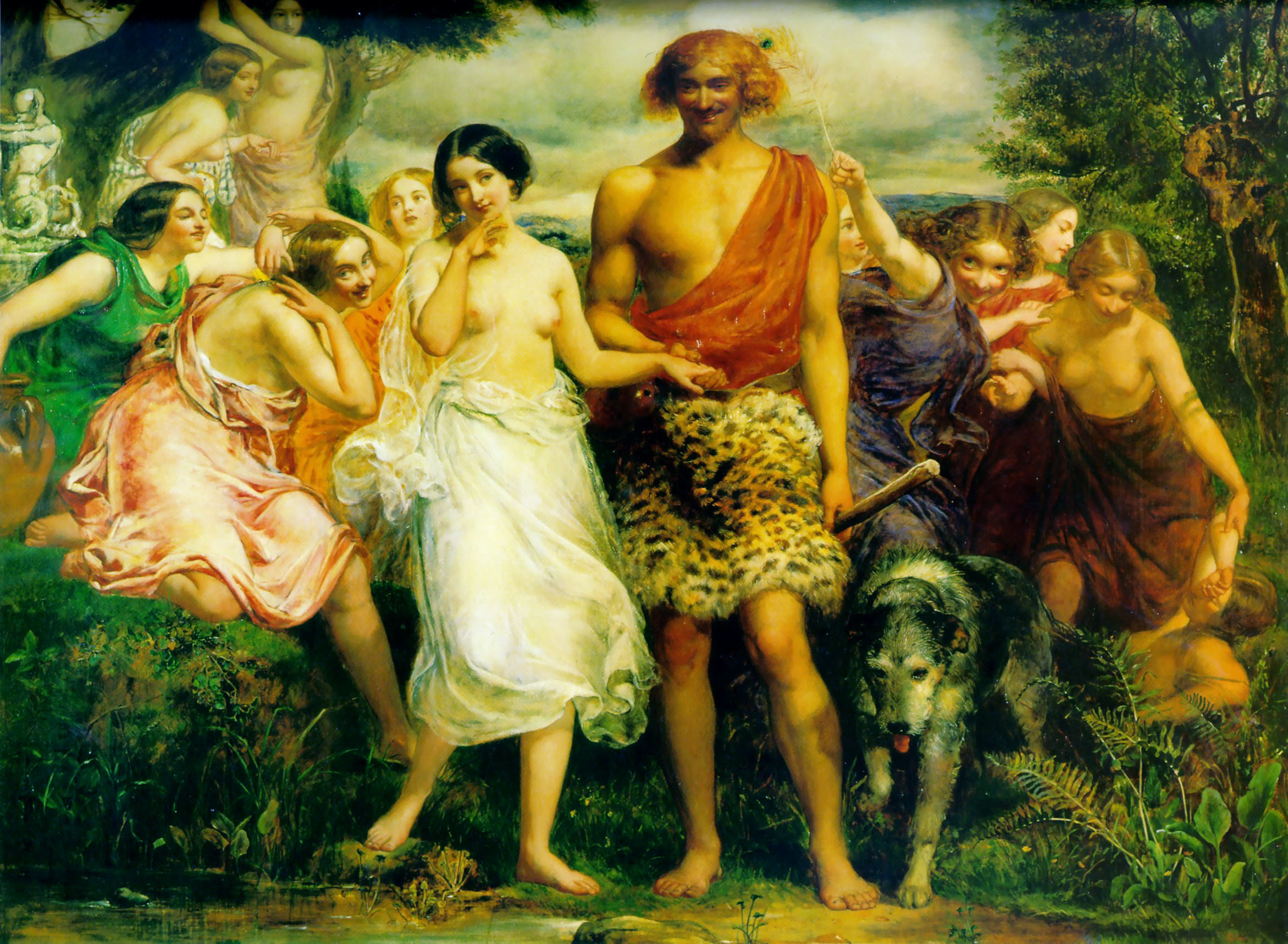
Cymon and Iphigenia, John Everett Millais (1848). Millais's early works were strongly influenced by Etty.

While Etty did have admirers, the patchy quality of his later work meant that he never acquired the circle of imitators and students that could have led to him being seen as the founder of the English realist movement, now considered to have begun in 1848 with the formation of the Pre-Raphaelite Brotherhood. William Holman Hunt and John Everett Millais, two of the three founders of the Pre-Raphaelites, were heavily influenced by Etty's early works but recoiled from his later style. Holman Hunt recollected that "in my youth [Etty] had lost the robustness he once had [...] the paintings of his advanced age cloyed the taste by their sweetness". Millais had consciously modelled his style on Etty, and his works prior to the formation of the Pre-Raphaelites are very similar in composition, but after 1848 the only similarity in style is the use of colour. As Pre-Raphaelitism waned Millais's style became more varied, and some of his later work such as The Knight Errant owes a strong debt to Etty's influence.

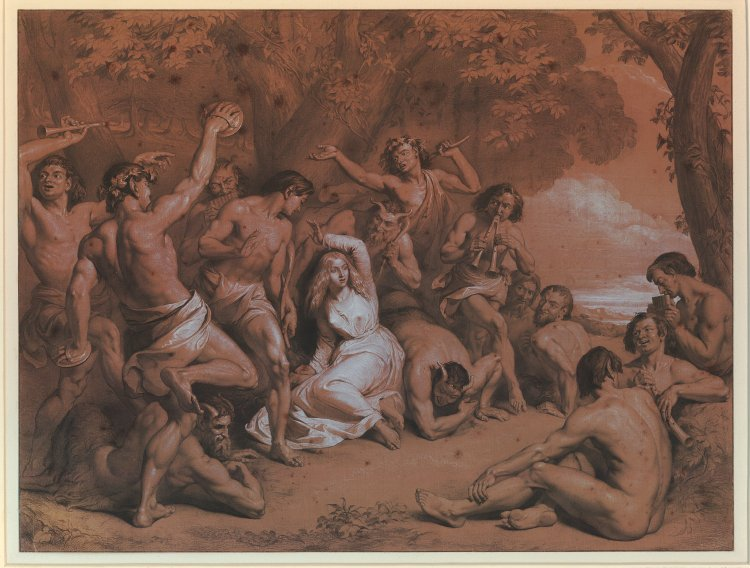
Una Alarmed by Fauns, William Edward Frost (1843, lithograph by Thomas Herbert Maguire 1847). Frost was one of the few English painters to continue to work in Etty's style in the decades following his death.

During his life Etty had acquired followers such as Irish painters William Mulready and Daniel Maclise, but both rejected Etty's preoccupation with nudes. Mulready painted nudes but became best known for domestic genre paintings, while Maclise chose to specialise in more traditional history paintings and exhibited only one nude work in his career. One of the few painters who consciously attempted to continue Etty's style after his death was William Edward Frost, who had been an acquaintance of Etty's since 1825. In the early 1830s Frost painted on commission for Thomas Potts (whose 1833 commission of Etty to paint his daughter Elizabeth's portrait had been Etty's first significant portrait commission), and later was commissioned on Etty's recommendation to paint a portrait of Etty's cousin Thomas Bodley. Frost successfully imitated Etty throughout his career, to the extent that his figure studies and Etty's are often misattributed to each other. Although Frost eventually became a Royal Academician in 1870, by this time Etty's style of painting had badly fallen out of fashion.

G. W. Milburn's 1911 statue of Etty, Exhibition Square, York

Victorian painting had gone through radical changes, and by the 1870s the realism of Etty and the Pre-Raphaelites had given way to the ideas of the Aesthetic Movement, abandoning the traditions of storytelling and moralising in favour of painting works designed for aesthetic appeal rather than for their narrative or subject. Although the aesthetic movement ultimately led to a brief revival of history painting, these works were in a very different style to Etty's. The new generation of history painters such as Edward Burne-Jones, Lawrence Alma-Tadema and Frederic Leighton sought to depict passivity, rather than the dynamism seen in previous works depicting the classical world. By the end of the 19th century, the value of all of Etty's works had fallen below their original prices. As the 20th century began, the increasingly influential Modernist movement, which came to dominate British art in the 20th century, drew its inspiration from Paul Cézanne and had little regard for 19th-century British painting.

In 1911, the city of York belatedly recognised Etty. A statue of Etty by G. W. Milburn was unveiled on 1 February outside the York Art Gallery in Exhibition Square, and a retrospective of 164 Etty paintings was held at the gallery despite opposition from some of Etty's descendants who refused to lend works for it. William Wallace Hargrove, proprietor of the York Herald, gave a speech recalling his memories of knowing Etty. Outside York, Etty generally remained little-known, with the majority of those galleries holding his works, other than the Lady Lever Art Gallery, the Russell-Cotes Museum and Anglesey Abbey, tending to keep them in storage. (Note: Lord Leverhulme, Sir Merton Russell-Cotes and Lord Fairhaven, founders of the Lady Lever Art Gallery, the Russell-Cotes Museum and the art collection of Anglesey Abbey respectively, were great admirers of Etty. Their collections were acquired long after Etty had fallen out of fashion, and they were consequently able to buy several significant Etty paintings at very low prices.) Minor Etty exhibitions in London in 1936 and 1938 had little impact, and likewise an exhibition of 30 Etty paintings in 1948 to mark the reopening of the York Art Gallery and another York exhibition of 108 paintings the following year to mark the centenary of his death. In 2001–02, five Etty paintings were included in Tate Britain's landmark Exposed: The Victorian Nude exhibition, which did much to raise Etty's profile, (Note: The five paintings exhibited were Youth and Pleasure, Britomart Redeems Faire Amoret, Musidora, The Wrestlers and Candaules.) and established Etty as "the first British artist to paint the nude with both seriousness and consistency". The restoration of The Sirens and Ulysses, completed in 2010, led to increased interest in Etty, and in 2011–12 a major exhibition of Etty's works was held at the York Art Gallery. The York Art Gallery continues to hold the largest collection of Etty's works.
