= 1825 in art =

Events in the year 1825 in Art.

== Events ==
- 2 May – Royal Academy Exhibition of 1825 opens at Somerset House in London
- August – English portrait artist Thomas Lawrence begins work on his portrait of King Charles X of France, the first of two French royal portraits commissioned by King George IV of the United Kingdom.
- End of year – John Constable formally ends his business relationship with his French dealer, John Arrowsmith.

== Works ==
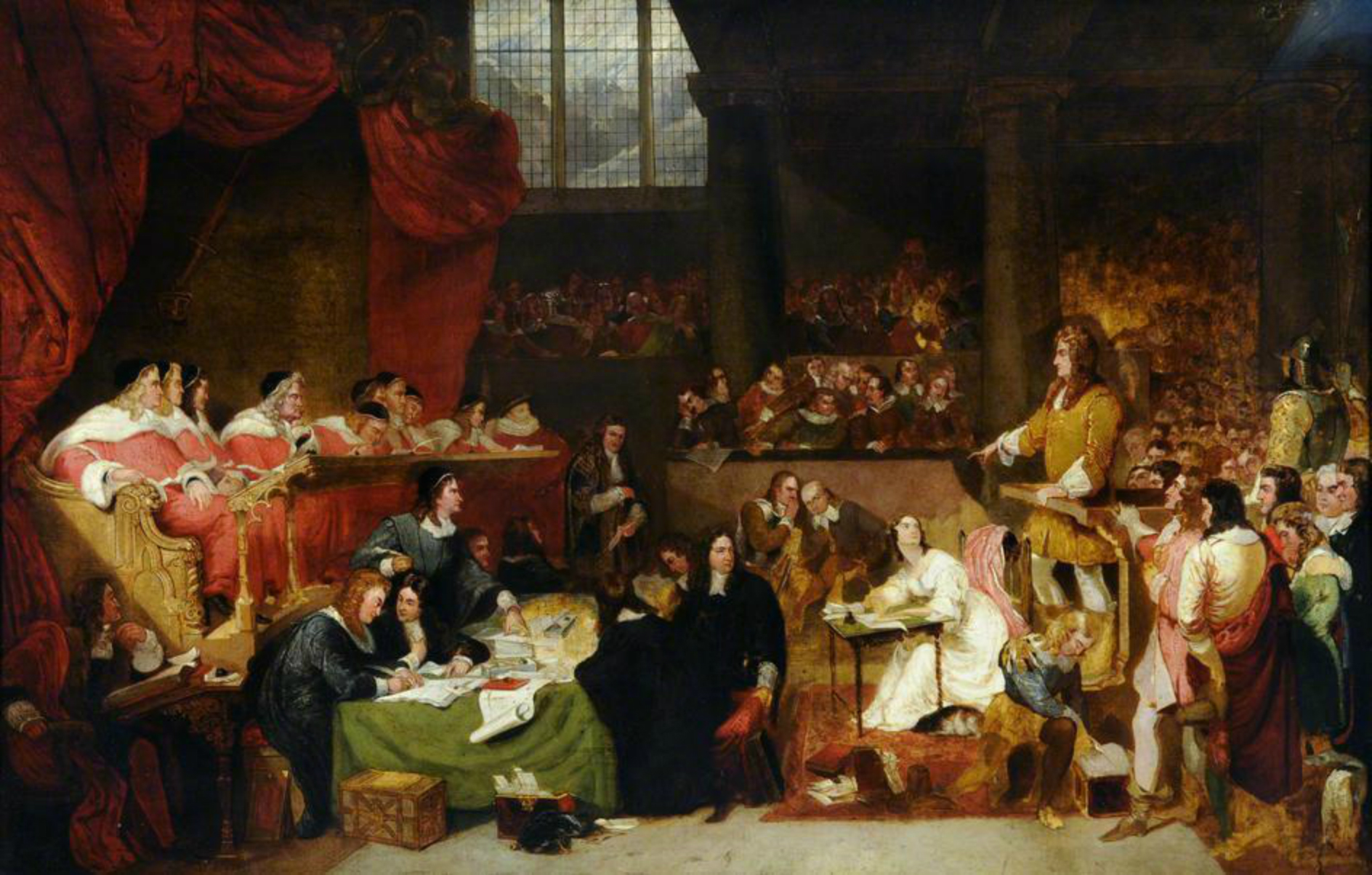
The Trial of William Lord Russell by George Hayter.

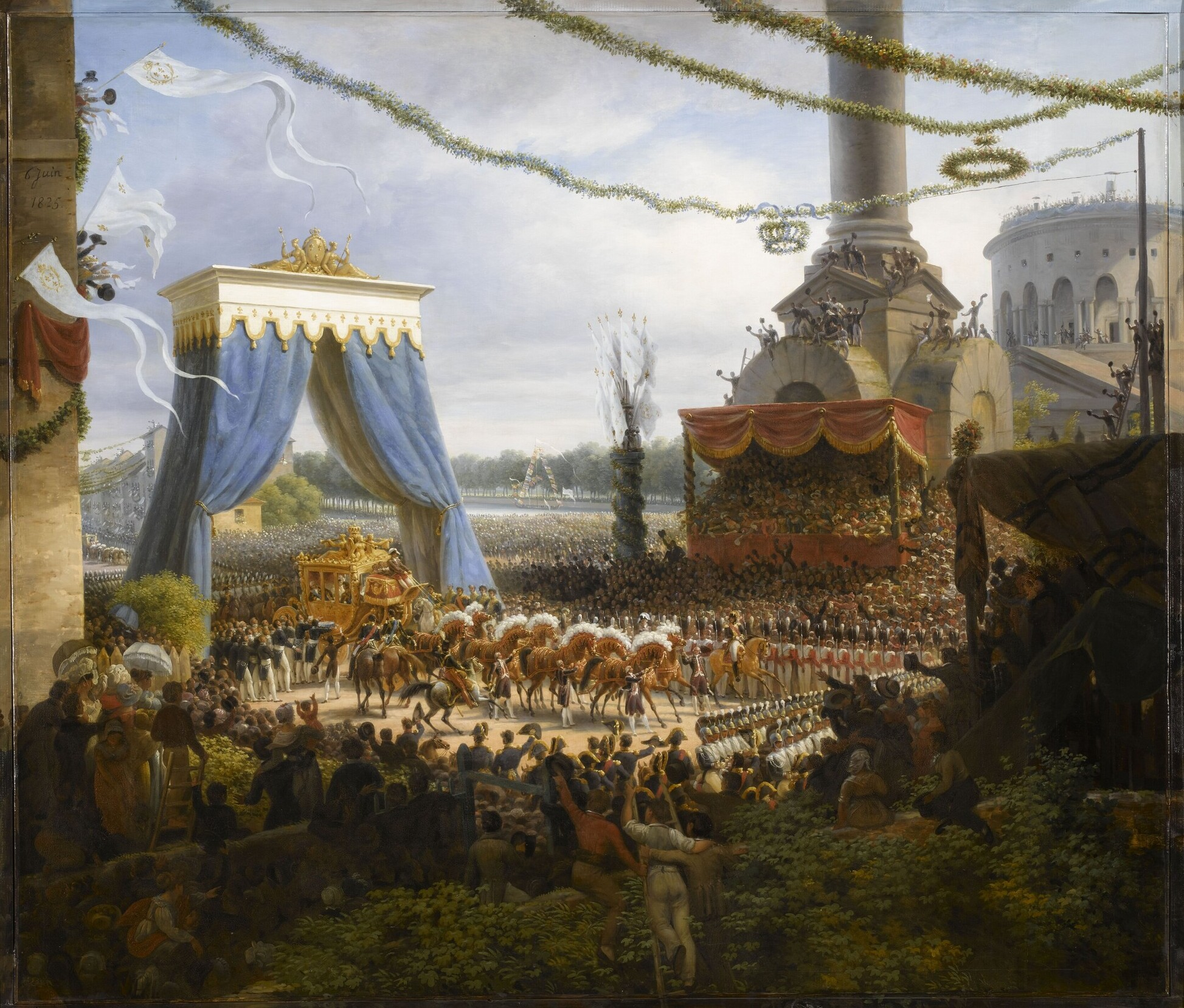
Entry of Charles X into Paris on 6 June 1825 by Louis-François Lejeune.

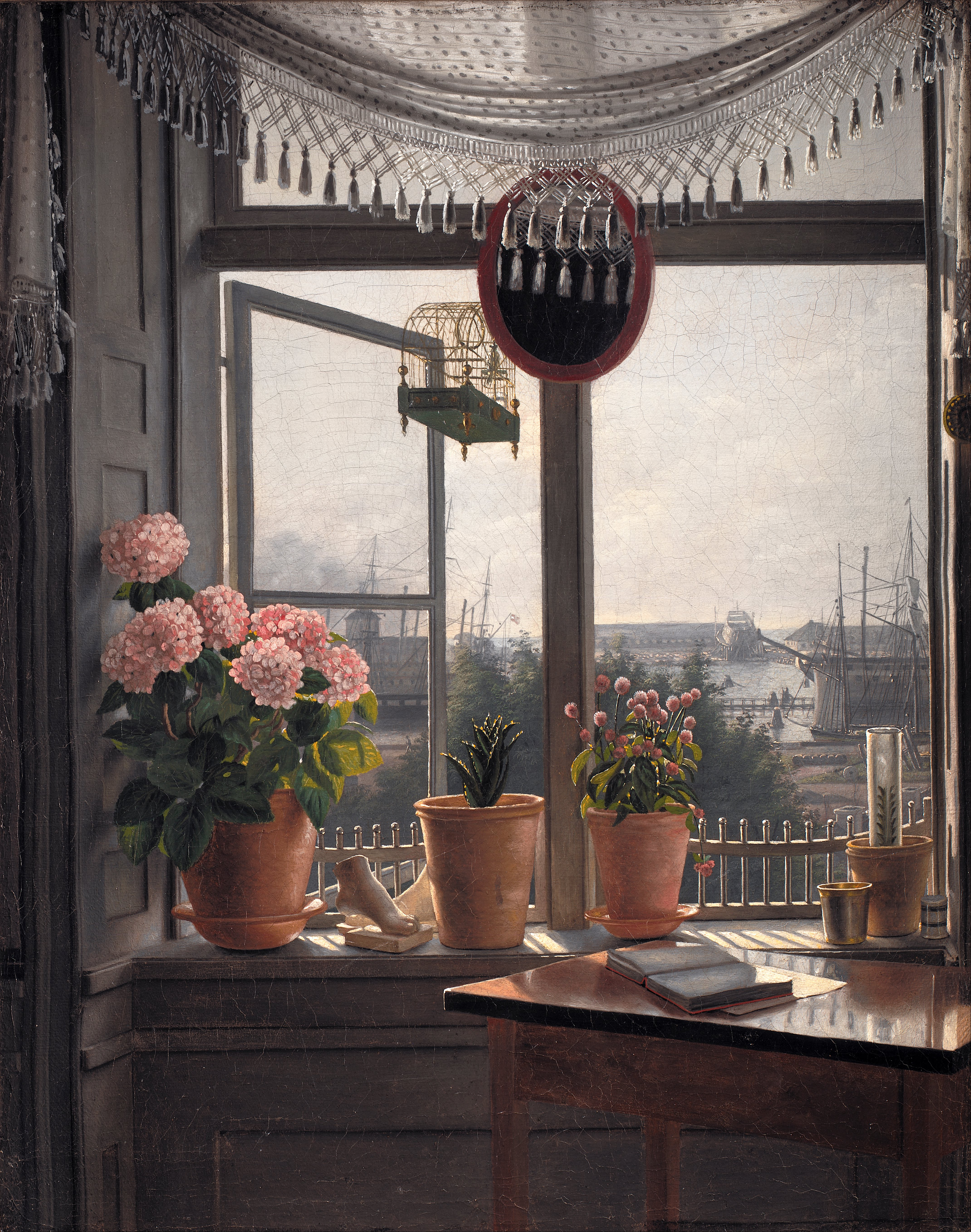
View from the Artist's Window by Rørbye.

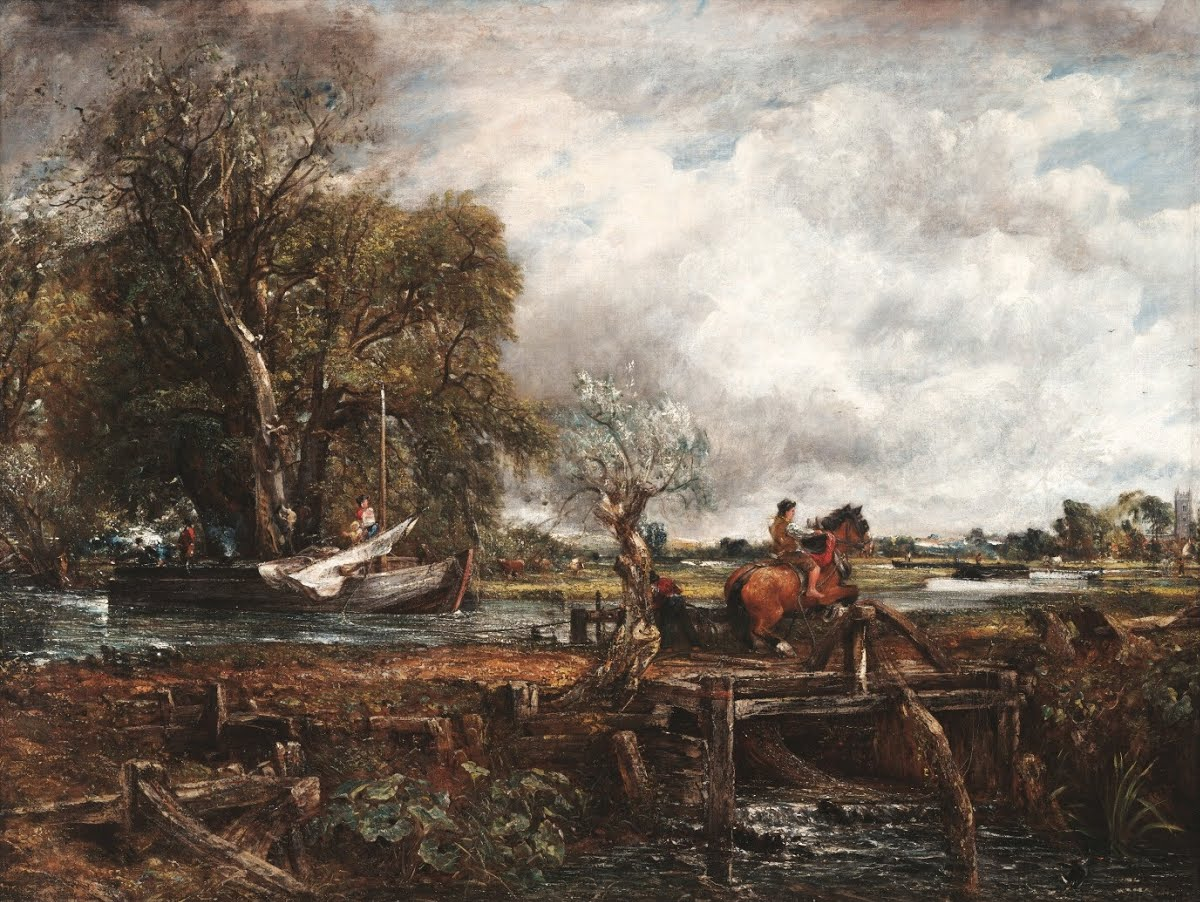
The Leaping Horse by John Constable

- Filippo Albacini – The Wounded Achilles (marble)
- Richard Parkes Bonington
  - On the Seine near Mantes
  - The Château of the Duchess of Berry
- Mather Brown – The Battle of the Nile
- John Constable
  - Branch Hill Pond, Hampstead Heath
  - The Leaping Horse
- Robert Dampier – Portrait of Princess Nahiennaena of Hawaii
- Eugène Delacroix – Tam O'Shanter
- John Doyle – Turning out the Stag
- William Etty – The Combat: Woman Pleading for the Vanquished
- Alexandre-Évariste Fragonard – Diane de Poitiers in the Studio of Jean Goujon
- François Gérard – Coronation Portrait of Charles X
- Thomas Lawrence
  - Portrait of the Duchess of Berry
  - Portrait of the Duke of Angoulême
- Louis-François Lejeune – Entry of Charles X into Paris after his coronation
- John Martin – Mezzotint illustrations to the Paradise Lost of Milton (publication begins)
- Samuel Morse – Portrait of Lafayette
- Alexander Nasmyth – Princes Street
- Samuel Palmer – Landscape with Repose of the Holy Family
- Thomas Phillips – Portrait of John Franklin
- Martinus Rørbye – View from the Artist's Window
- Clarkson Stanfield – Lake Como
- J.M.W. Turner – The Harbour of Dieppe
- Bartholomeus van Hove – Pompenburg with Hofpoort in winter

== Births ==
- February 4 – Myles Birket Foster, English illustrator and watercolour painter (died 1899)
- March 13 – Hans Gude, Norwegian painter (died 1903)
- May 1 – Eleanor Vere Boyle, English watercolorist and illustrator (died 1916)
- May 9 – James Collinson, English Pre-Raphaelite painter (died 1881)
- July 6 – Randolph Rogers, American neoclassical sculptor (died 1892)
- July 10 – Benjamin Paul Akers, American sculptor (died 1861)
- August 12 – Vito D'Ancona, Italian painter (died 1884)
- September 6 – Giovanni Fattori, Italian painter (died 1908)
- September 13 – William Henry Rinehart, American sculptor (died 1874)
- December 13 – Gerolamo Induno, Italian painter (died 1890)

== Deaths ==
- January 11 – Jacopo Tumicelli, Italian portrait miniature painter (born 1784)
- February 24 – Toyokuni, Japanese master of ukiyo-e, especially Kabuki actor prints (born 1769)
- March 8 – Adélaïde Dufrénoy, French poet and painter from Brittany (born 1765)
- March 25 – Raphaelle Peale, American still-life painter (born 1774)
- April 6 – Vladimir Borovikovsky, Ukrainian-born portrait painter (born 1757)
- April 16 – Henry Fuseli, British painter and art critic (born 1741)
- April 23 – Friedrich Müller, German painter, narrator, lyricist and dramatist (born 1749)
- April 27 – Vivant Denon, French artist, writer, diplomat, author and archaeologist (born 1747)
- May 5 – François-Louis Gounod, French painter (born 1758)
- May 21 – Pierre-Charles Jombert, French painter (born 1748)
- June 1 – Giovanni Monti, Italian landscape painter (born 1765)
- June 13 – Johann Peter Melchior, German porcelain modeller (born 1742)
- June 14 – Pierre Charles L'Enfant, French architect and artist (born 1754)
- June 22 – Domenico Vantini, Italian painter specializing in miniature portraits (born 1765)
- September 28 – Barbara Krafft, Austrian portrait painter (born 1764)
- November 17 – Daniel Berger, German engraver (born 1744)
- December 29 – Jacques-Louis David, French painter (born 1748)
