= Royal Academy Exhibition of 1825 =

1825 art exhibition in London

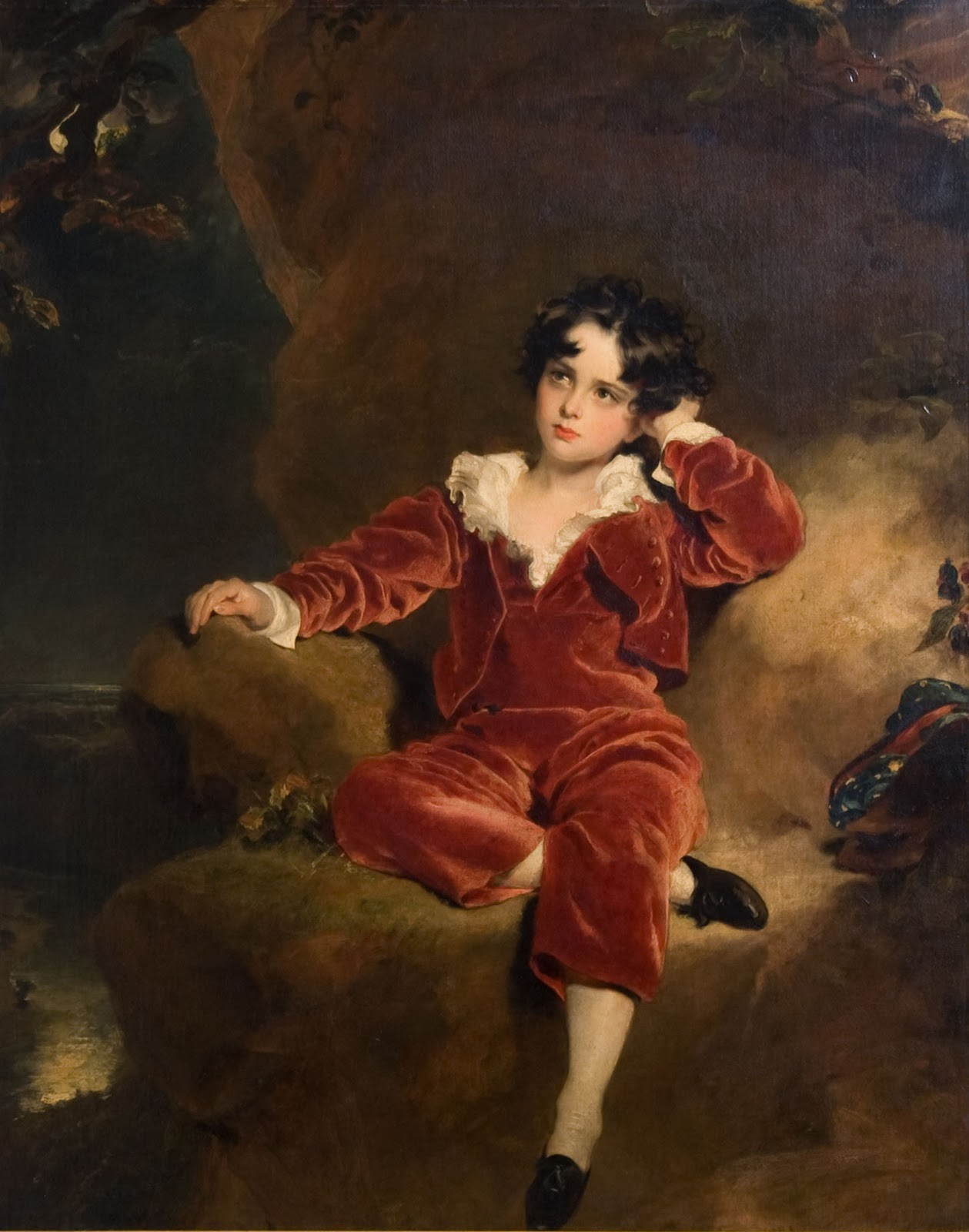
The Red Boy by Thomas Lawrence

The Royal Academy Exhibition of 1825 was the annual Summer Exhibition of the British Royal Academy of Arts. It was held at Somerset House in London from 2 May to 9 July 1825 during the Regency Era.

The President of the Royal Academy Thomas Lawrence displayed a number of portraits of leading figures such as the future Prime Ministers George Canning and the Duke of Wellington , the Lord Chancellor Lord Eldon and his Portrait of Princess Sophia the sister of George IV. However it was his painting of the son of the opposition Whig politician John Lambton which came to be known as The Red Boy which became one of his best known pictures. Richard Westall displayed an earlier portrait of Lord Byron who had died in the Greek War of Independence the previous year.

John Constable, fresh from his success at the Salon of 1824 in Paris, showed one of his six-footers The Leaping Horse, a view of Constable Country on the River Stour. His rival landscape painter J.M.W. Turner submitted ,The Harbour of Dieppe. The Scottish genre painter David Wilkie displayed The Highland Family but did not submit any works for several years as he was travelling around Continental Europe.

Critics noted a resurgence of history painting with works such as William Etty's The Combat and William Hilton's Christ Crowned with Thorns. The Irish artist William Mulready enjoyed success with his genre painting The Travelling Druggist. The sculptor Richard Westmacott was praises for his work The Afflicted Peasants.

== Gallery ==
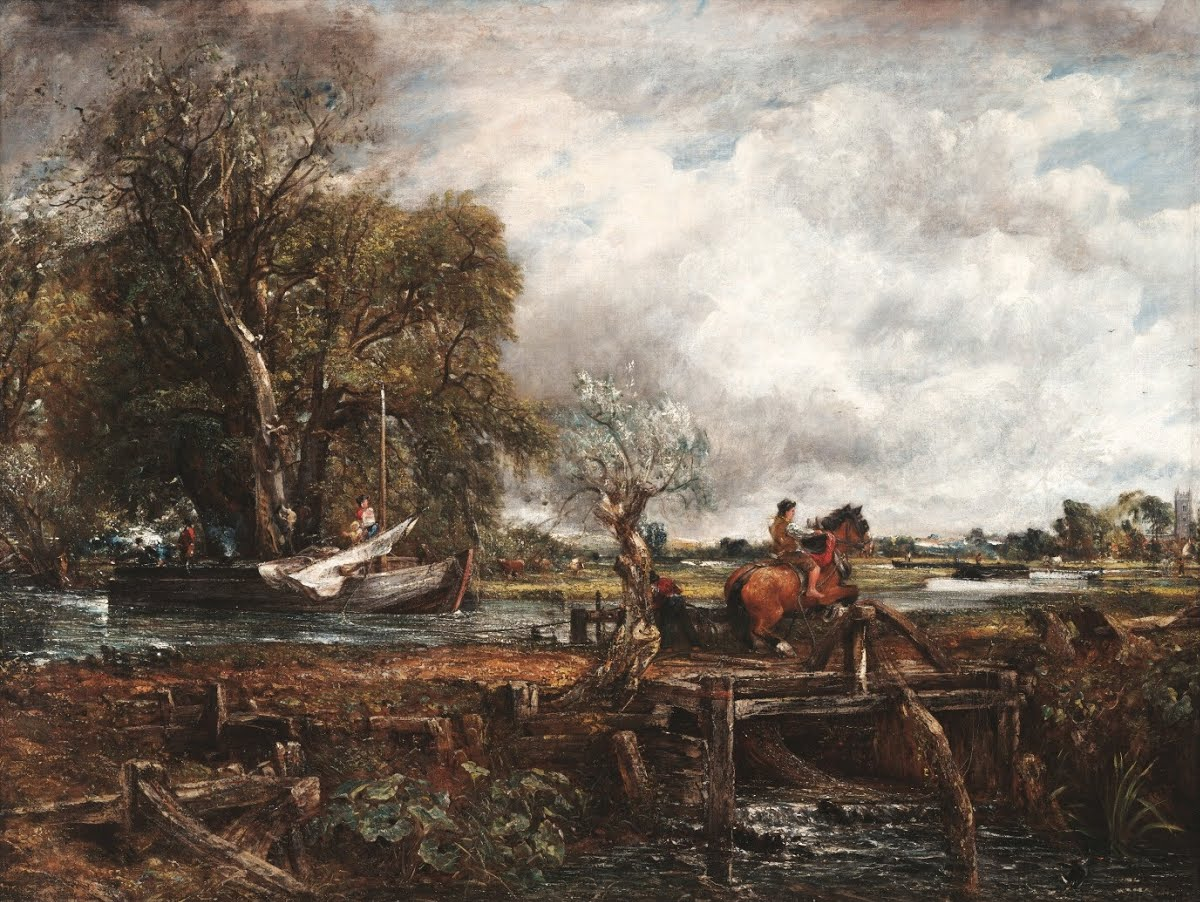
The Leaping Horse by John Constable

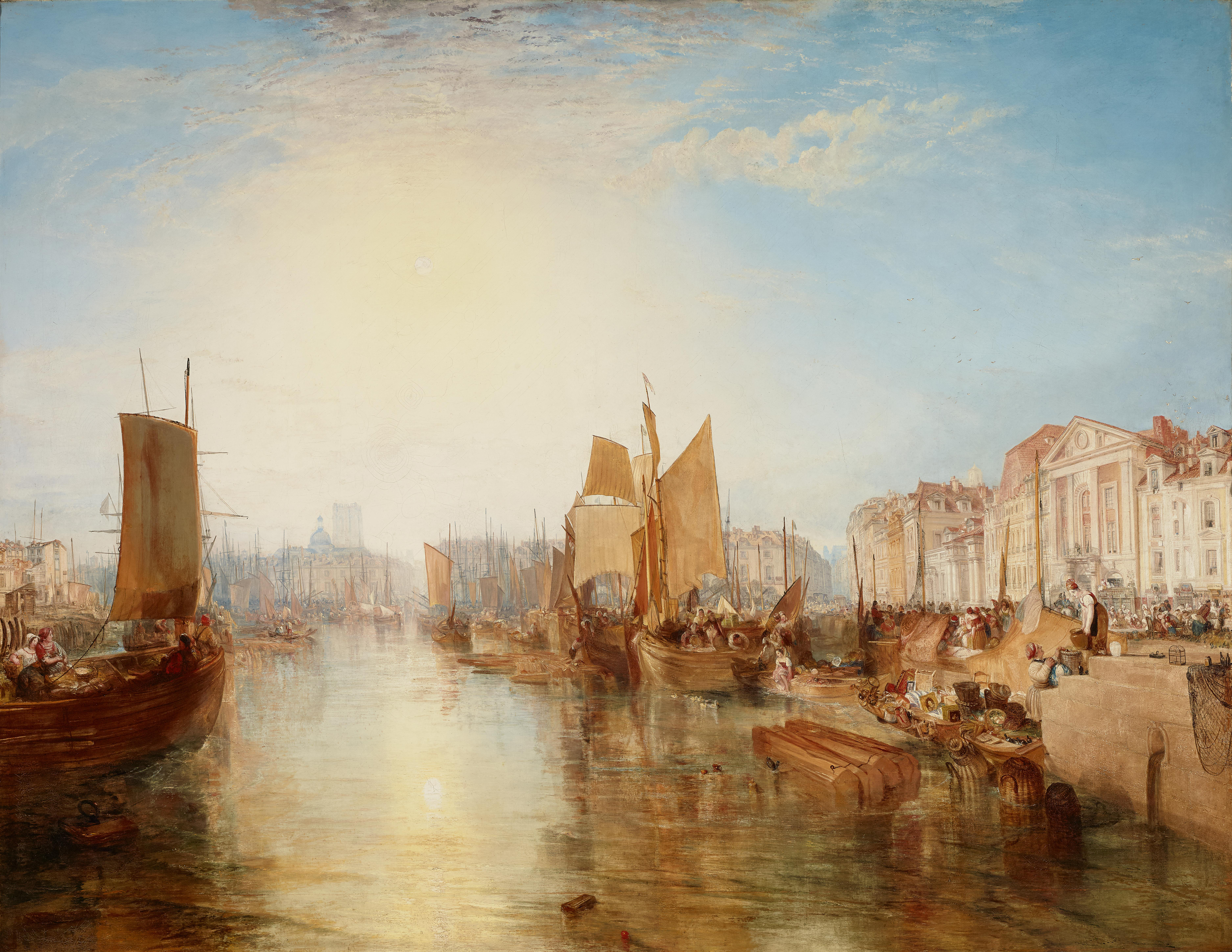
The Harbour of Dieppe by J.M.W. Turner

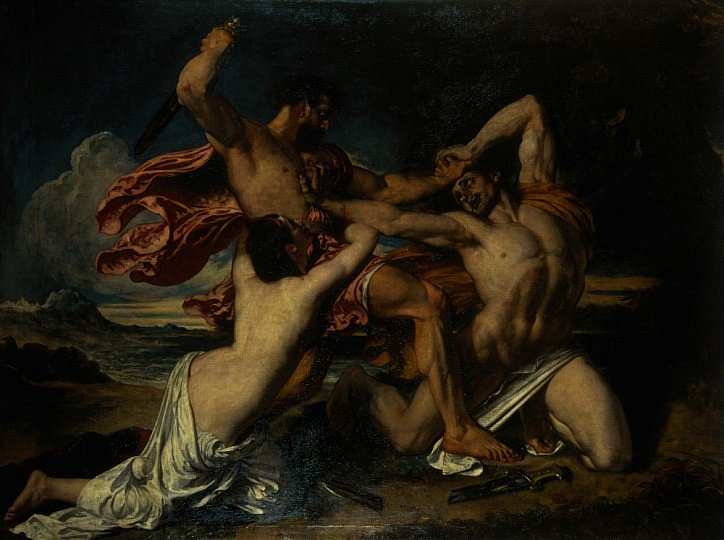
The Combat by William Etty

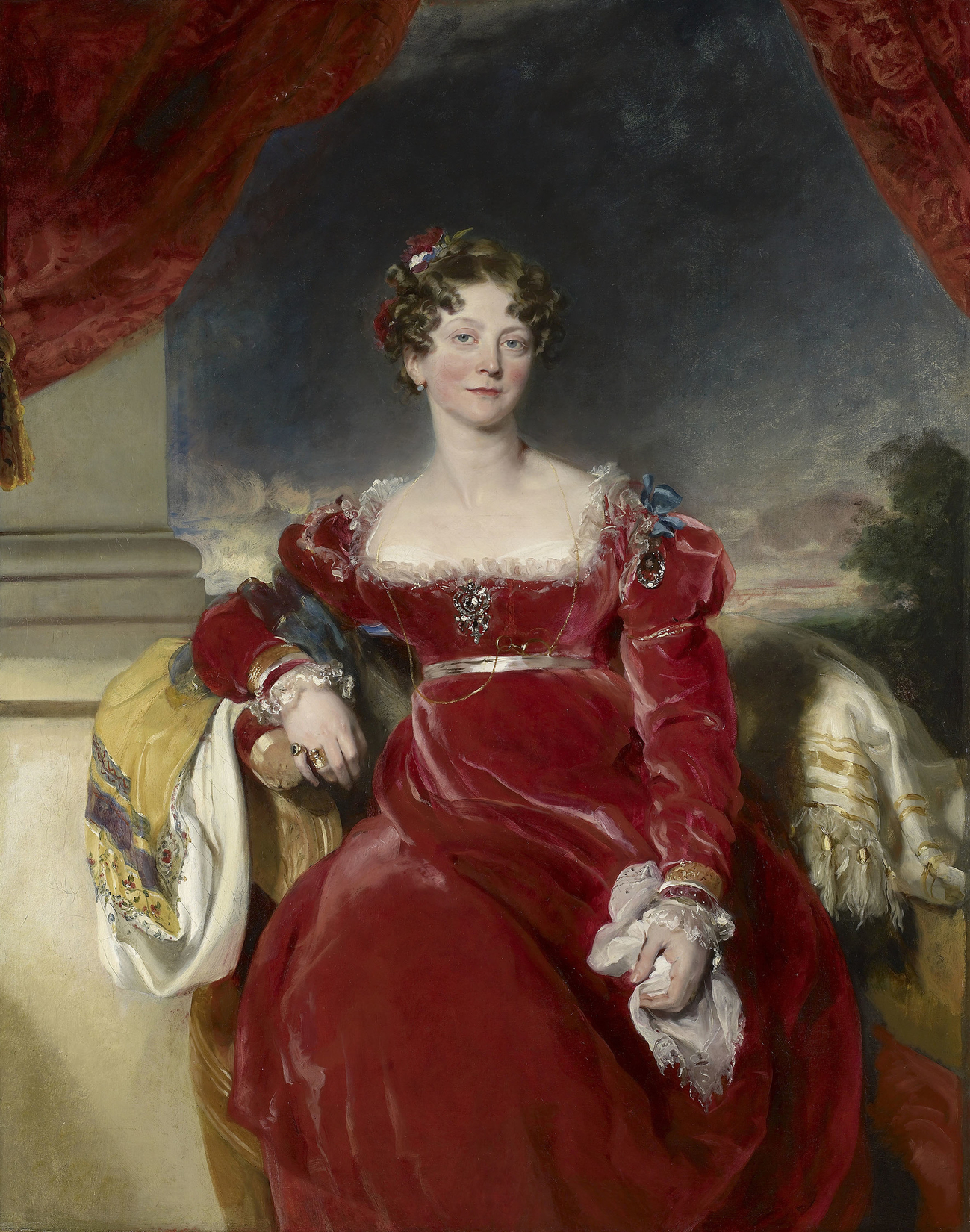
Portrait of Princess Sophia by Thomas Lawrence

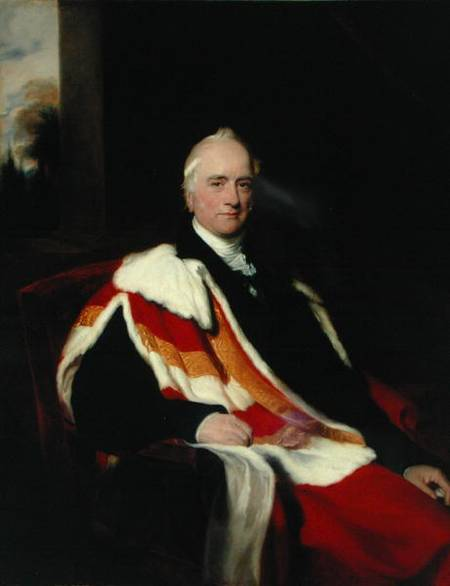
Portrait of Lord Bexley by Thomas Lawrence

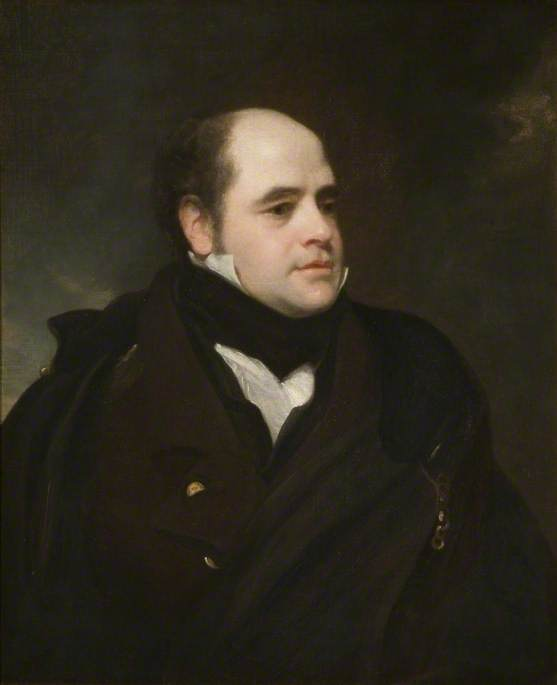
Portrait of John Franklin by Thomas Phillips

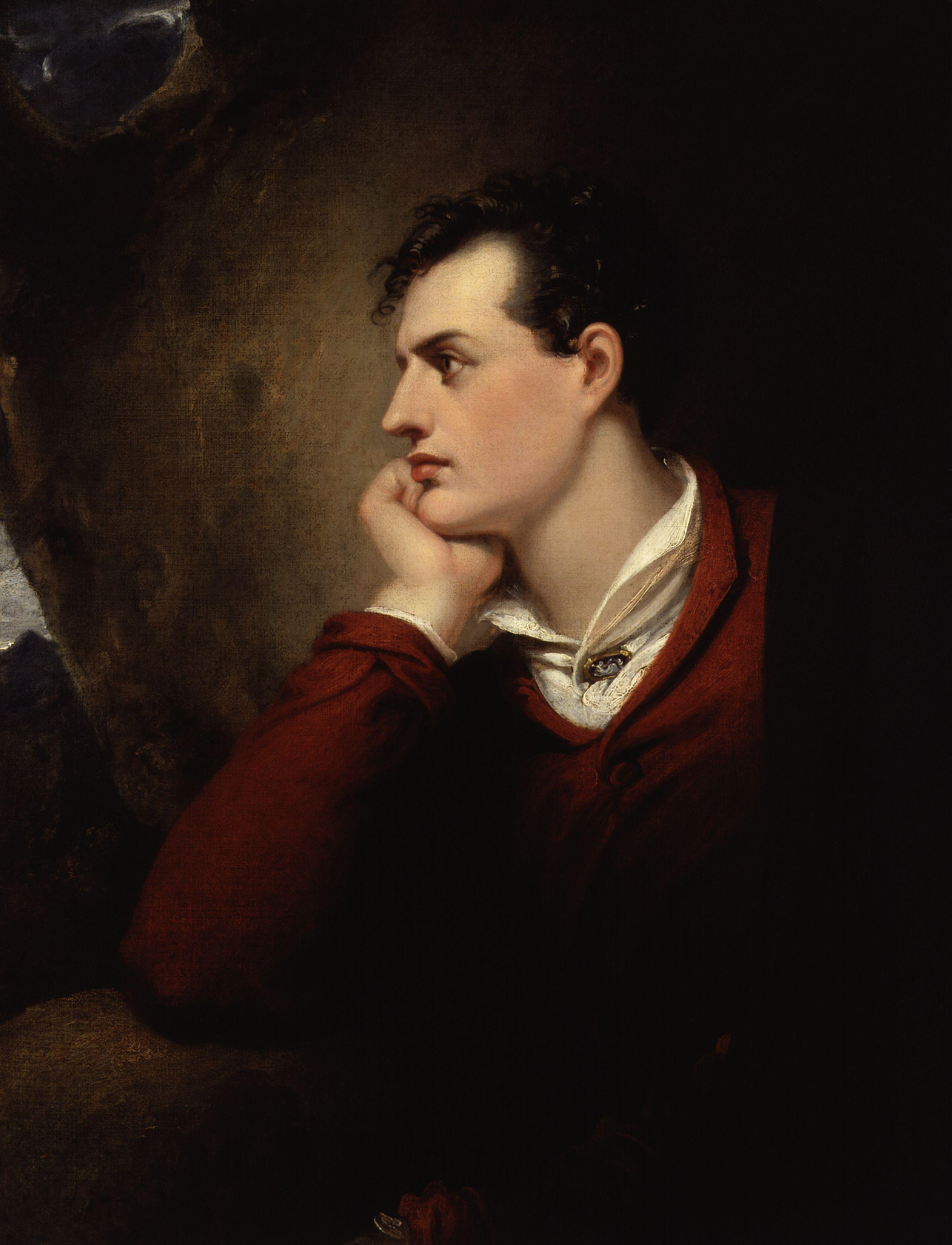
Portrait of Lord Byron by Richard Westall

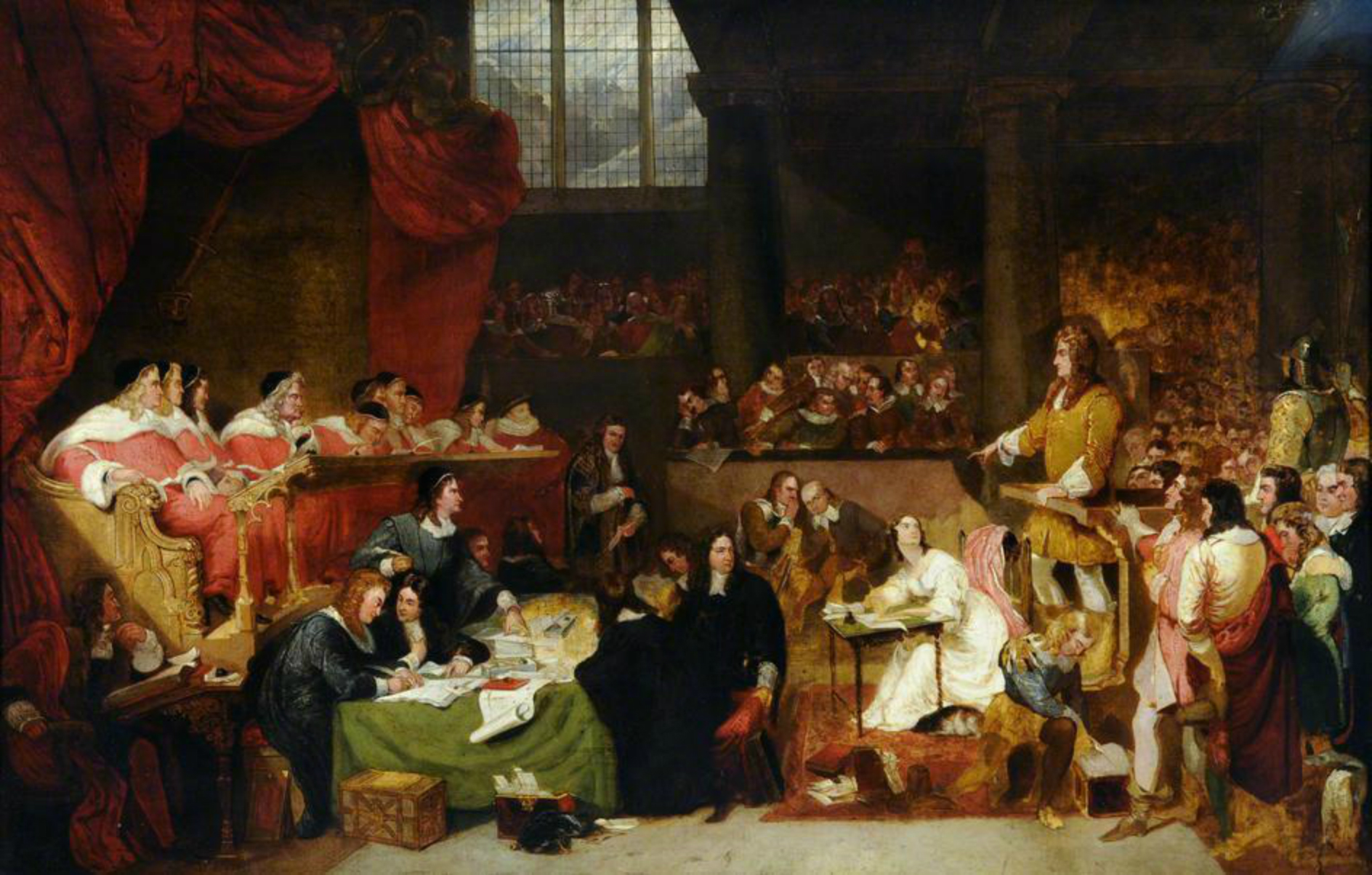
The Trial of William Lord Russell by George Hayter

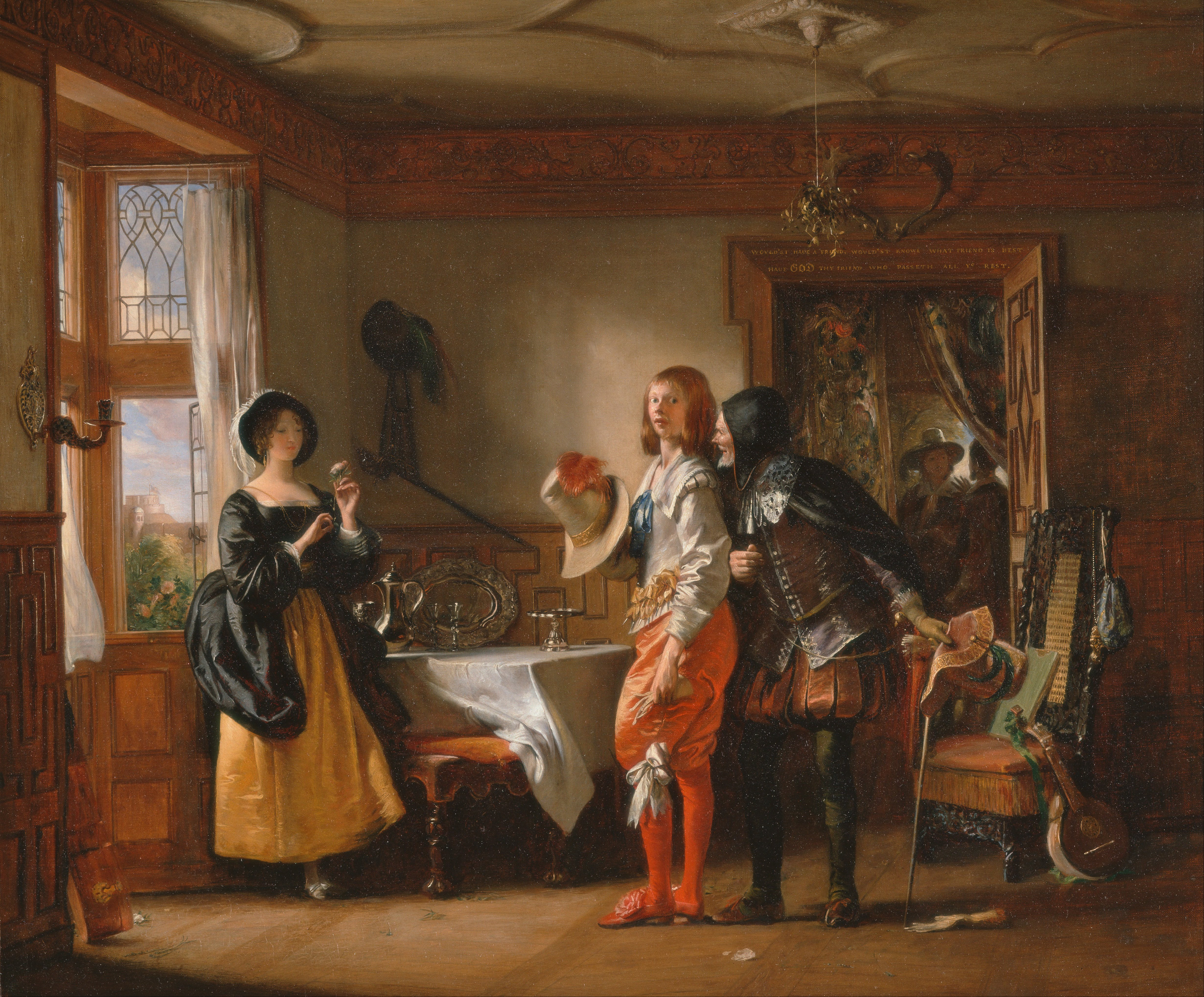
Slender Courting Anne Page by Charles Robert Leslie

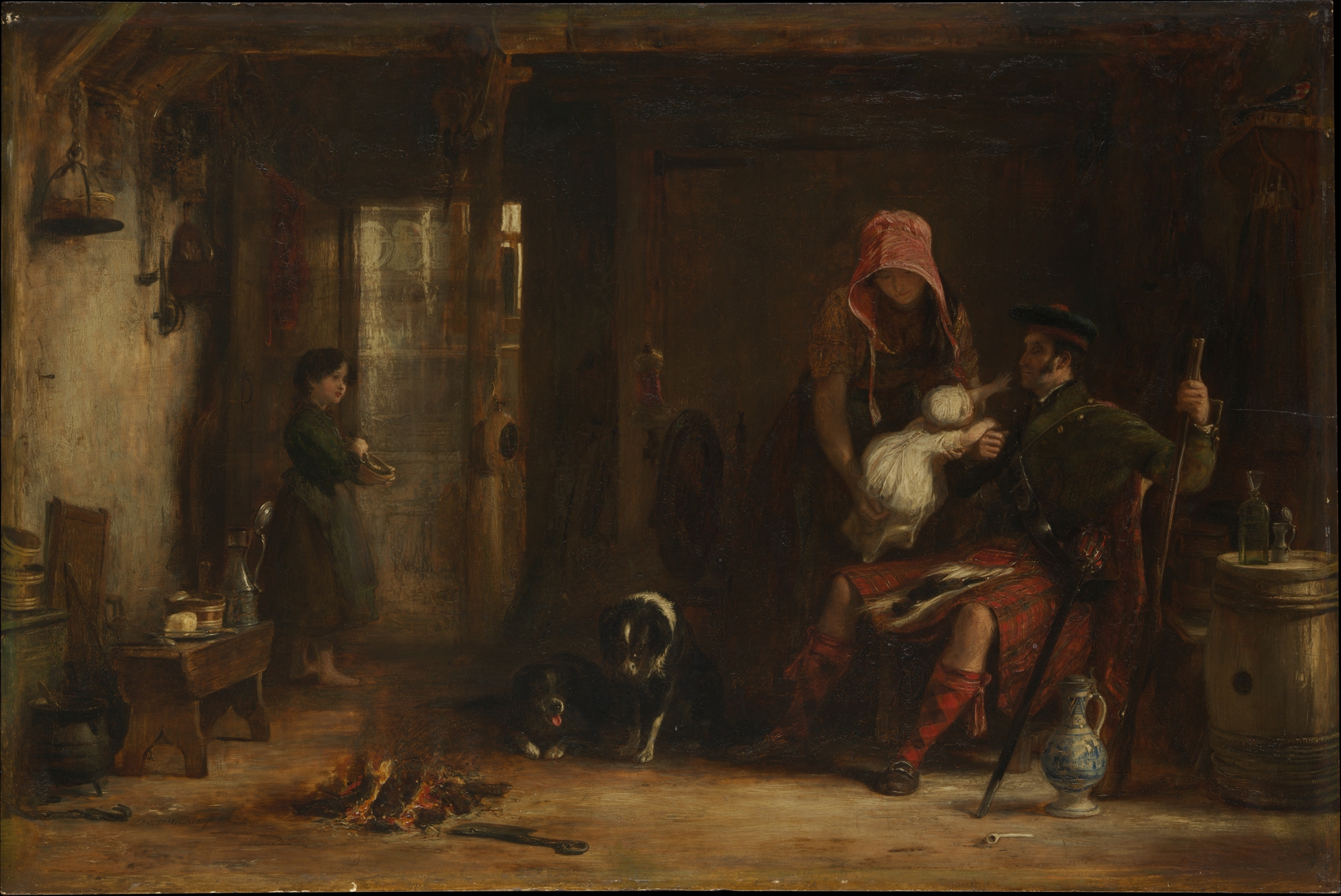
The Highland Family by David Wilkie

== Bibliography ==
- Bailey, Anthony. J.M.W. Turner: Standing in the Sun. Tate Enterprises Ltd, 2013.
- Hamilton, James. Turner - A Life. Sceptre, 1998.
- Levey, Michael. Sir Thomas Lawrence. Yale University Press, 2005.
- Tromans, Nicholas. David Wilkie: The People's Painter. Edinburgh University Press, 2007.
