= William Duffield =

William Duffield may refer to:

- William Duffield (painter) (1816–1863), British still-life painter
- William E. Duffield (1922–2001), member of the Pennsylvania State Senate, 1971–1978
- William Ward Duffield (1820–1912), solicitor, and brother of Walter Duffield.
- William Ward Duffield (1823–1907), coal industry executive, railroad construction engineer and Union Army officer
