= Portrait of Princess Sophia =

1824 painting by Thomas Lawrence

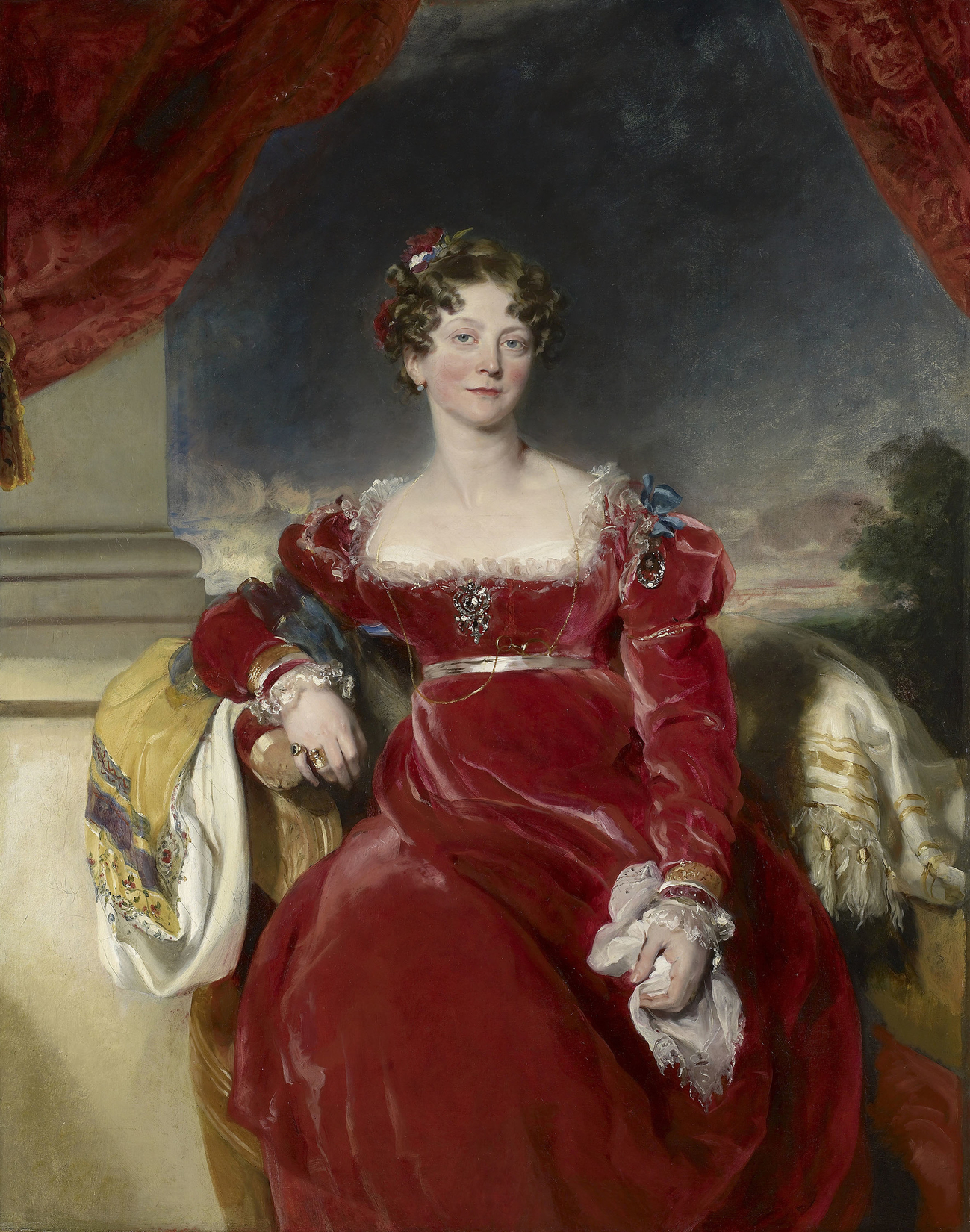
- Artist: Thomas Lawrence
- Year: 1824
- Type: Oil on canvas
- Dimensions: 141.2 cm × 111.9 cm (55.6 in × 44.1 in)
- Location: Royal Collection, Windsor Castle

Portrait of Princess Sophia is an oil on canvas portrait painting by the English artist Thomas Lawrence depicting Princess Sophia, one of the younger daughters of George III, from 1824.

== History and description ==
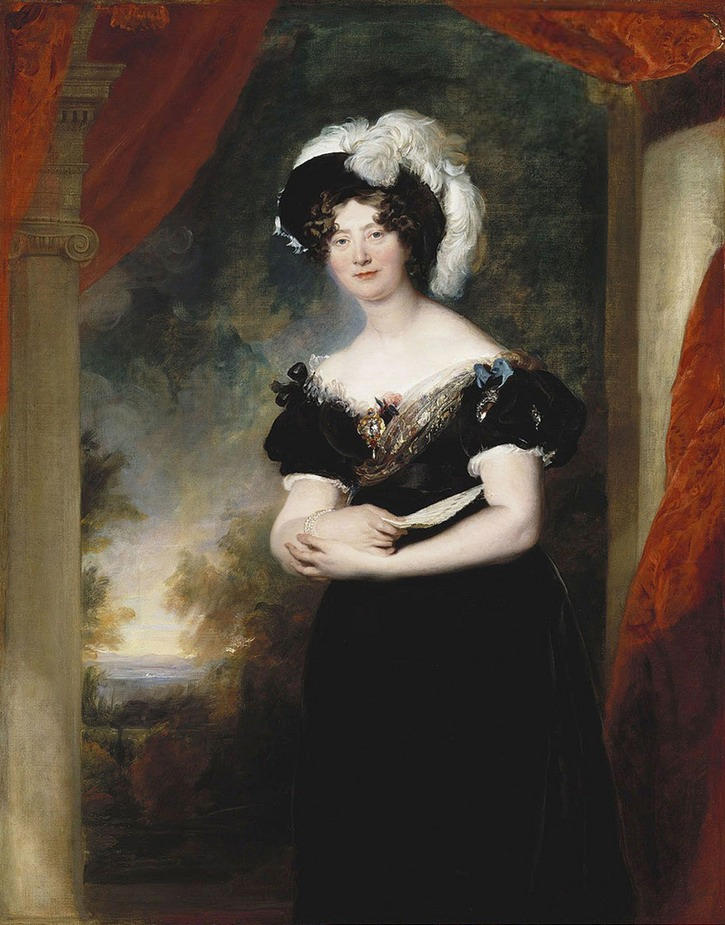
Portrait of Princess Mary by Thomas Lawrence. Sophia's elder sister

Lawrence painted many members of the ruling House of Hanover. The work was commissioned by George IV and portrayed the king's favourite sister. He paid Lawrence three hundred guineas for the painting, also commissioning a portrait of her elder sister Princess Mary.

The painting was displayed at the Royal Academy Exhibition of 1825 at Somerset House in London. Lawrence shows Sophia in a vivid red dress with her jewellery prominently showcased. The king hung it in his own bedroom. Today it remains in the Royal Collection along with many of Lawrence's paintings. It is hung in the Green Drawing Room of Windsor Castle.

== Bibliography ==
- Holmes, Richard. Thomas Lawrence Portraits. National Portrait Gallery, 2010.
- Levey, Michael. Sir Thomas Lawrence. ISBN 0300109989. Yale University Press, 2005.
