= George Thomas Doo =

British engraver

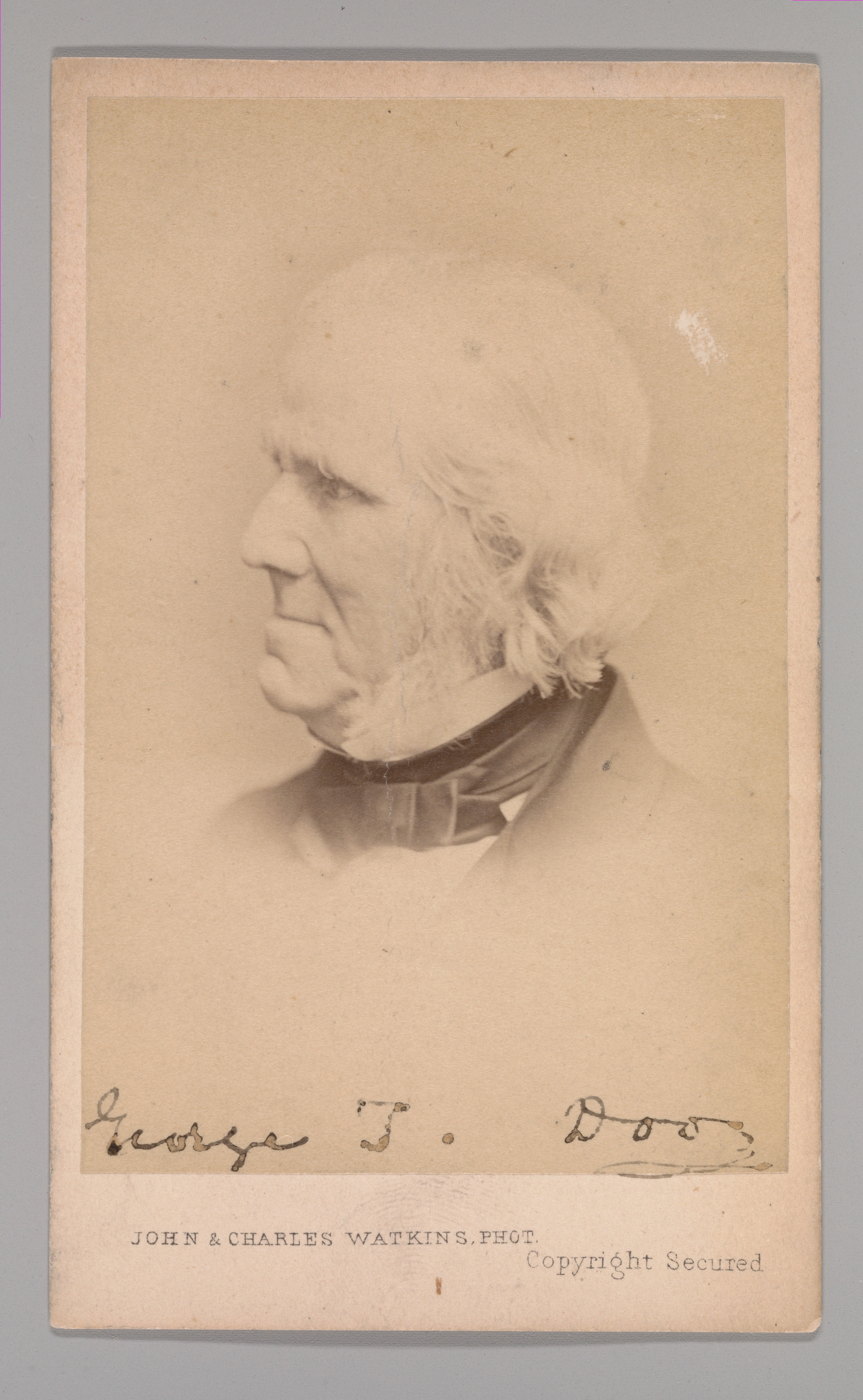
- Born: George Thomas Doo; 6 January 1800; London, England
- Died: 13 November 1886 (aged 86); Sutton, London, England
- Occupations: Engraver, Historical engraver of Queen Victoria
- Years active: 1800–1886

George Thomas Doo RA (6 January 1800 – 13 November 1886) was a British engraver.

== Life ==
Doo was born near Christ Church in Southwark, London. His teacher was Charles Heath. He went to Paris in 1825. There he studied in the Suisse atelier, and also attended a school run by Antoine-Jean Gros, according to Thompson Cooper; the Oxford Dictionary of National Biography suggests his study under Charles-Alexandre Suisse might have been later. He acquired the techniques of drawing from the life, and passed them on to pupils in England.

He took on William Duffield as a non-paying pupil, and William Thomas Roden was an apprentice. Another pupil was Thomas Leeming Grundy. In 1836 Doo was made Engraver in Ordinary to William IV, and later to Queen Victoria. At this period he worked for Francis Moon. Doo became a Fellow of the Royal Society in 1851. He was made a Royal Academician in 1857. Doo died in Sutton, Surrey.

== Works ==
In 1824 he published his first plate, after a portrait of Prince Frederick, Duke of York and Albany by Thomas Lawrence.

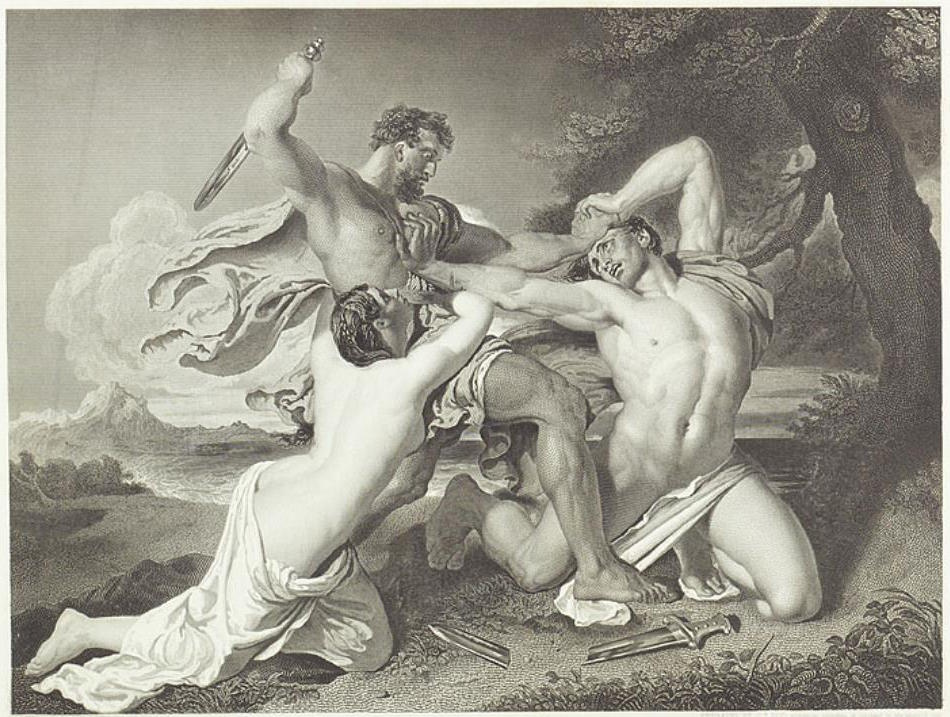
The Combat

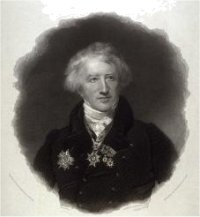
Portrait of Georges Cuvier after the painting by Henry William Pickersgill

Doo's better-known works include his 1848 line-engraving The Combat after William Etty's painting from 1825. He is also known for his engraving of "Knox preaching before the Lords of the Congregation" after David Wilkie, "Italian Pilgrims coming in sight of Rome" after Charles Lock Eastlake, the "Infant Christ" after Raphael and the "Ecce Homo" after Correggio. His 1864 engraving of the "Raising of Lazarus" by Sebastiano del Piombo took him eight years.
