= William Thomas Roden =

British artist (1818–1892)

William Thomas Roden RBSA
- Born: 31 May 1818; Birmingham, England
- Died: 25 December 1892 (aged 74); Handsworth, Staffordshire
- Occupation: Artist
- Years active: 1843–1873

William Thomas Roden RBSA (31 May 1818 – 25 December 1892) was a nineteenth-century English artist.

== Life ==
William Thomas Roden was born in Bradford Street, Birmingham, England, the son of William and Sarah Roden. He was apprenticed to a Mr. Vye, an engraver, who was married to Roden's sister Lavinia. On Tye's recommendation, Roden moved to London to become an apprentice to George Thomas Doo. He continued to practise engraving for about ten years. Later he returned to Birmingham, where he found success as a portrait painter.

The Birmingham painters William Roden Jr (professional portrait painter, working c. 1866-82), W. Frederick Roden (portrait and figure painter, working c. 1876 – 1889) and Mary Roden (flower painter, working c. 1881 – 1897), are thought to be three of his children.

He died on Christmas Day 1892, at his sister Lavinia's house in Handsworth, after a long illness.

== Career ==
William Thomas Roden exhibited in London between 1843 and 1879, including six works at the Royal Academy, two at the British Institute (1806–67), and four at the Royal Society of British Artists.

He was a prominent figure within the Royal Birmingham Society of Artists. He exhibited between 1843 and 1887 and was a member for 25 years, from 1848 to 1873. In total, Roden exhibited 86 works at the RBSA Gallery, including 65 portraits (presumably all commissions, since none for sale); a few landscapes; paintings of biblical, literary, or classical subject matter; and some engravings. Notable sitters for Roden include Lord Palmerston, Lord Gladstone, Cardinal Newman, Joseph Chamberlain and fellow artist, Peter Hollins.

In 1867 Roden was made the Director of the Life Academy. He held the position for two years, before swapping to become the Director of the Costume Academy instead. In 1872 he resigned from this position, and left the society completely in 1873.

== Notable works ==
For many years William Thomas Roden painted nearly all the presentation portraits that were wanted in the town. As well as private commissions, Roden painted a number of portraits by subscription for presentation to Birmingham Council House, Aston Hall, Birmingham Museum and Art Gallery, the General Hospital and Saltley College.

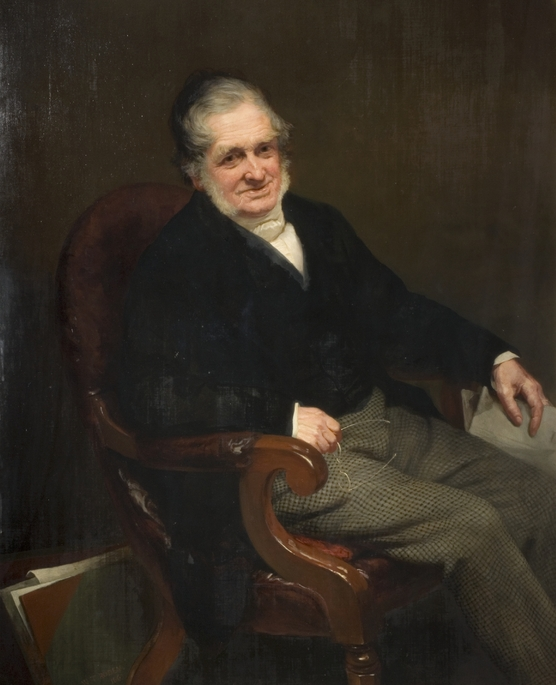
Samuel Lines (1863)

Notable works include:

- portrait of William Ewart Gladstone
- portrait of The Reverend G.D. Boyle, Vicar of Kidderminster (c. 1868), painted for presentation by his former congregation of Handsworth
- portrait of Samuel Lines (1863)
- portrait of Professor Chamberlin (c. 1864)
- portrait of Sir John Ratcliff F.S.A (Lord Mayor of Birmingham, 1856–58) (c. 1860), painted for presentation to Lady Ratcliff by subscription of members of the Town Council
- portrait of Lord Palmerston (c. 1863)
- posthumous portrait of the Right Hon. Lord Lytlleton (c. 1877)

Eighteen of Roden's portraits in oils are owned by the Birmingham Museum and Art Gallery, including Portrait of Cardinal John Henry Newman (1879), Portrait of Peter Hollins Esq (c. 1868).

An engraving by Roden, entitled Head of Woman, was presented to the Royal Birmingham Society of Artists by fellow RBSA member Samuel Henry Baker (1824–1909) after Roden's death, and remains in the Society's permanent collection. It has since been identified as being after Antonio da Correggio’s Madonna of the Basket.
