= Mary Elizabeth Duffield-Rosenberg =

English painter and botanical illustrator

Mary Elizabeth Duffield
- Born: Mary Elizabeth Rosenberg; 1819; Bath, Somerset, England
- Died: 1914 (aged 94–95)
- Known for: Painting
- Style: Floral art
- Spouse: William Duffield

Mary Elizabeth Duffield, née Rosenberg (1819–1914) was a British flower painter and the wife of the still life painter William Duffield.

== Life and work ==
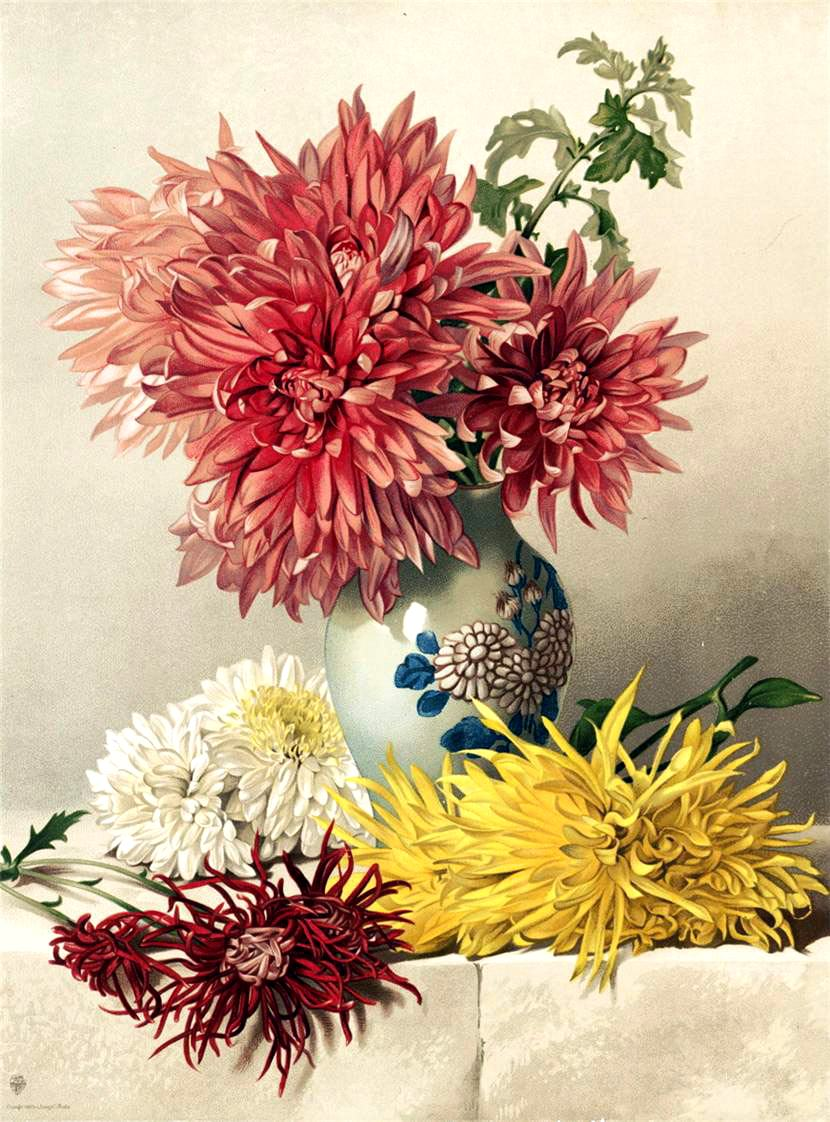
Chrysanthemums (1883)

She was born in Bath as the eldest daughter of Mr. T. E. Rosenberg, and became a painter of fruit and flowers. She was a member of the Institute of Painters in Water-Colours and married the still life painter William Duffield in 1850.

Duffield exhibited her work at the Palace of Fine Arts at the 1893 World's Columbian Exposition in Chicago, Illinois.

Her painting Yellow Roses was included in the 1905 book Women Painters of the World.

== Bibliography ==
- This article incorporates text from a publication now in the public domain: Fagan, Louis Alexander (1888). "Duffield, William". In Stephen, Leslie (ed.). Dictionary of National Biography. Vol. 16. London: Smith, Elder & Co. p. 132.
