= William Duffield (painter) =

English painter

- Born: 1816
- Died: 1863 (aged 46–47)

William Duffield (1816–1863) was a British still-life painter.

== Life ==
Duffield was born at Bath in 1816, and educated in that city, was the second son of Charles Duffield, at one time proprietor of the Royal Union Library. At an early age he displayed a decided predilection and talent for drawing. George Doo, the engraver, having been struck by Duffield's highly elaborated pen-and-ink sketches and faithful copies of his engravings, offered to take him as his pupil without a premium. A few years later he placed himself under George Lance, and was noted for his unremitting attention and assiduity as a student of the Royal Academy.

After completing the usual course of study in London, he returned to Bath, and later on proceeded to Antwerp, where, under Egide Charles Gustave Wappers, he worked for two years. In 1857 he lived at Bayswater, and died on 3 September 1863.

== Family ==
In 1850, he married Mary Elizabeth Rosenberg (1819–1914), eldest daughter of Mr. T. E. Rosenberg of Bath, and a painter of fruit and flowers; she was a member of the Institute of Painters in Water-Colours.
