= Portrait of John Franklin =

1825 painting by Thomas Phillips

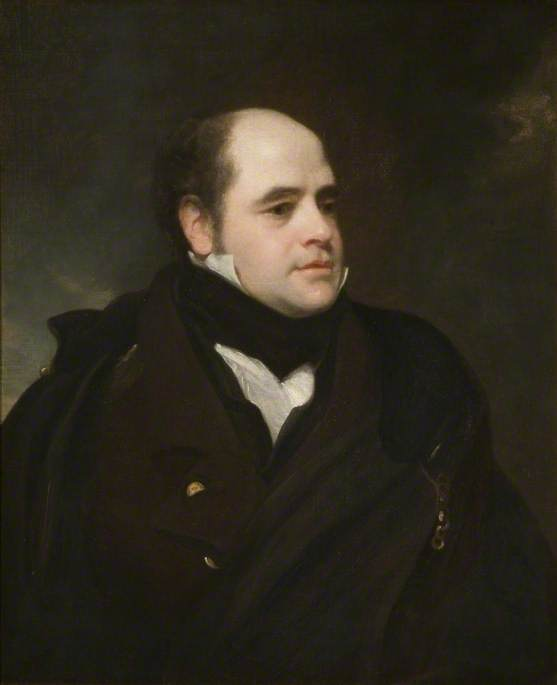
- Artist: Thomas Phillips
- Year: 1825
- Type: Oil on canvas, portrait painting
- Dimensions: 76.3 cm × 62.3 cm (30.0 in × 24.5 in)
- Location: Birmingham Museum and Art Gallery, Birmingham

Portrait of John Franklin is an 1825 portrait painting by the British artist Thomas Phillips depicting the Royal Navy officer and noted explorer John Franklin.

== History ==
A veteran of the Napoleonic Wars, Franklin is best known today for leading disastrous expedition to find the Northwest Passage through the Arctic in 1845. Despite an extensive search organised by the Admiralty, Franklin and his expedition were never recovered.

The Dudley-born Phillips established himself as a noted portraitist during the Regency era and continued his career during the early Victorian era. This painting wss displayed at the Royal Academy Exhibition of 1825 at Somerset House in London. Today it is in the collection of Birmingham Museum and Art Gallery in the West Midlands, having been presented by the Birmingham Society of Artists in 1867.

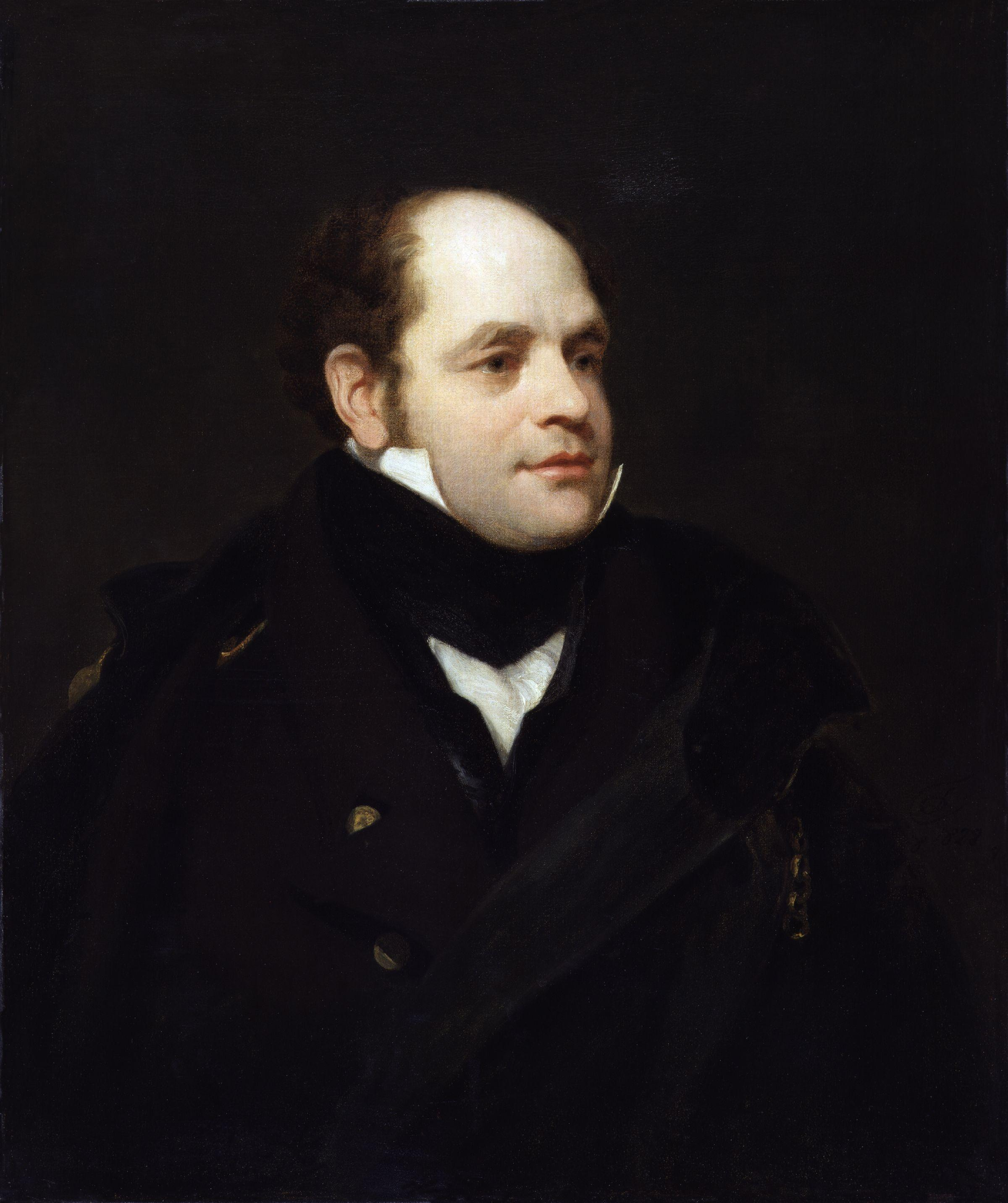
1828 version in the National Portrait Gallery.

A replica work was produced in 1828 at the request of his second wife Lady Franklin. It is today in the National Portrait Gallery, having been donated in 1892 by the niece of Lady Franklin.

== Bibliography ==
- Ellis, Andrew & Roe, Sonia. Oil Paintings in Public Ownership in Birmingham. Public Catalogue Foundation, 2008.
