= The Leaping Horse =

Painting by John Constable

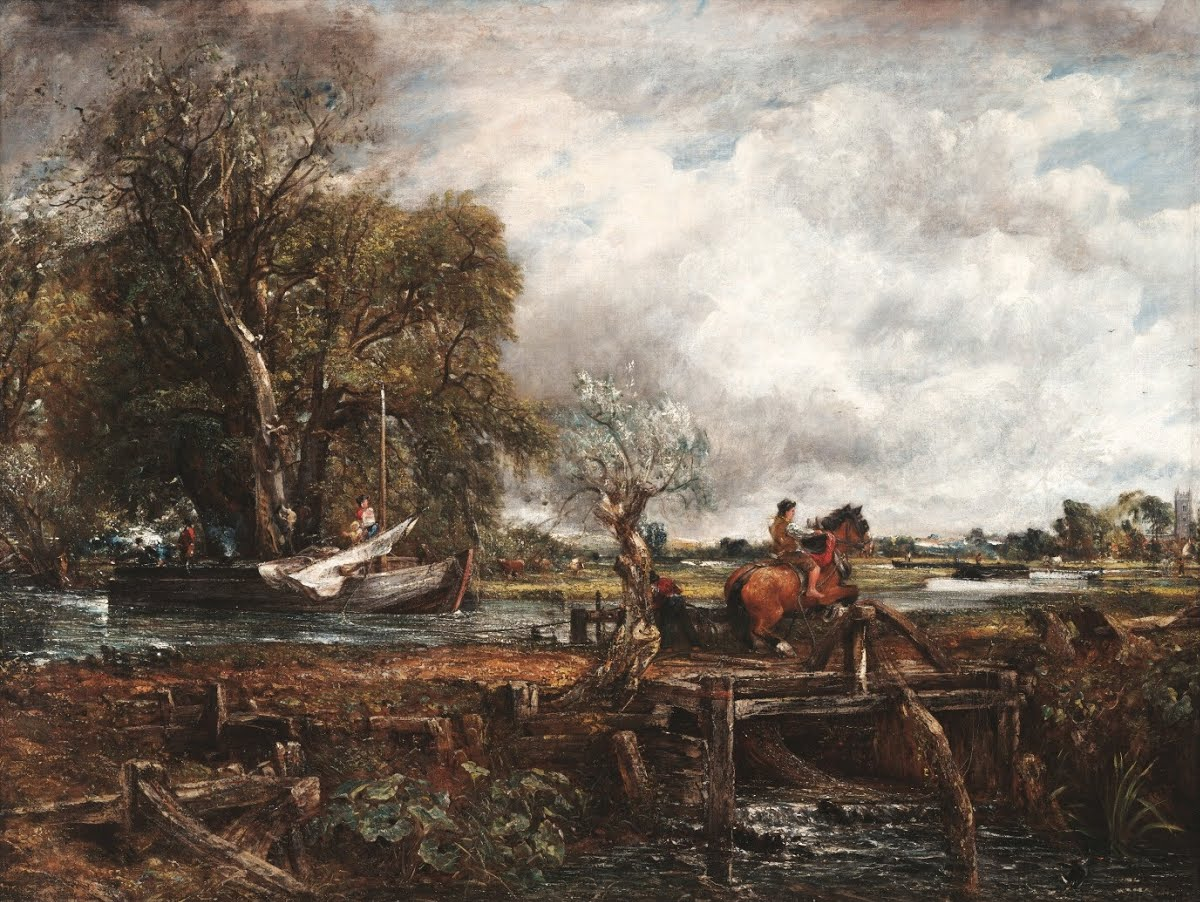
- Artist: John Constable
- Year: 1825
- Type: Oil on canvas, landscape painting
- Dimensions: 129.4 cm × 188 cm (50.9 in × 74 in)
- Location: Royal Academy, London

The Leaping Horse is an 1825 landscape painting by the British artist John Constable. It portrays a scene on the River Stour in Constable Country. A tow horse pulling a barge is shown leaping over one of the cattle guard barriers erected to stop cattle wandering. It was one of the large "six-footers" he produced from 1819 onwards.

It was displayed at the Royal Academy's Summer Exhibition of 1825 under the simple title of Landscape. It is now in the collection of the Royal Academy having been acquired in 1889. A full-sized preparatory study for the painting is in the Victoria and Albert Museum.

== See also ==
- List of paintings by John Constable

== Bibliography ==
- Bermingham, Ann. Landscape and Ideology: The English Rustic Tradition, 1740-1860. University of California Press, 1989.
- Hamilton, James. Constable: A Portrait. Hachette UK, 2022.
- Humphreys, Richard. John Constable: The Leaping Horse. Royal Academy of Arts, 2018.
- Reynolds, Graham. Constable's England. Metropolitan Museum of Art, 1983.
- Thornes, John E. John Constable's Skies: A Fusion of Art and Science. A&C Black, 1999.
