= The Highland Family =

Painting by David Wilkie

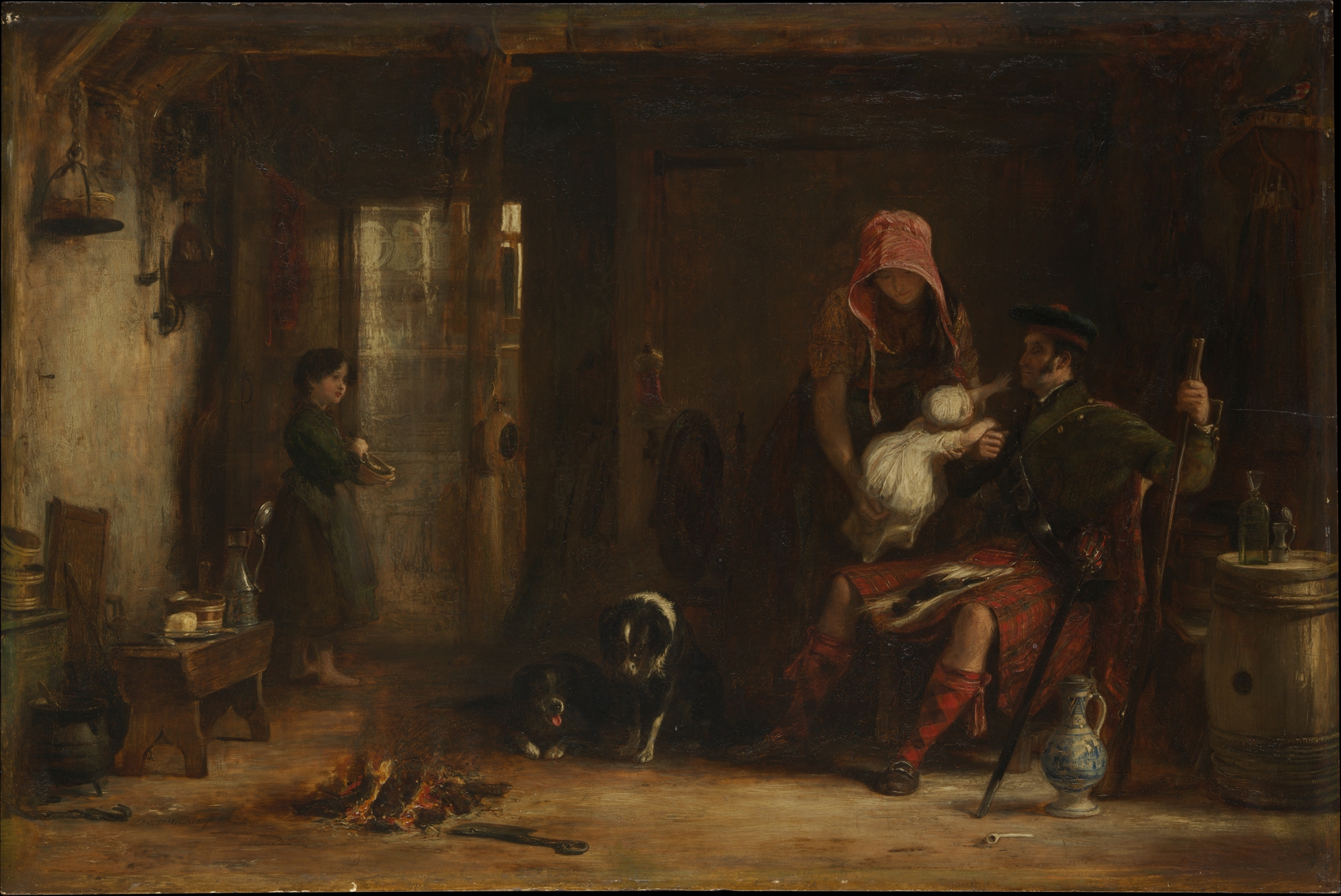
- Artist: David Wilkie
- Year: 1824
- Medium: Oil on wood
- Dimensions: 61 cm × 91.4 cm (24 in × 36.0 in)
- Location: Metropolitan Museum of Art, New York
- Accession: 15.30.52

The Highland Family is an oil on wood painting by British artist David Wilkie, from 1824. It is in the collection of the Metropolitan Museum of Art, in New York. It depicts the dark interior of a modest Scottish Highlands home. The father of the family is seated, at right, dressed in a typical Highlands outfit, including his kilt, with his little daughter, who stands on his leg, and his wife. Two collie dogs are at the center of the composition, near a fireplace, and another daughter is at the door.
