= François-Louis Gounod =

French painter

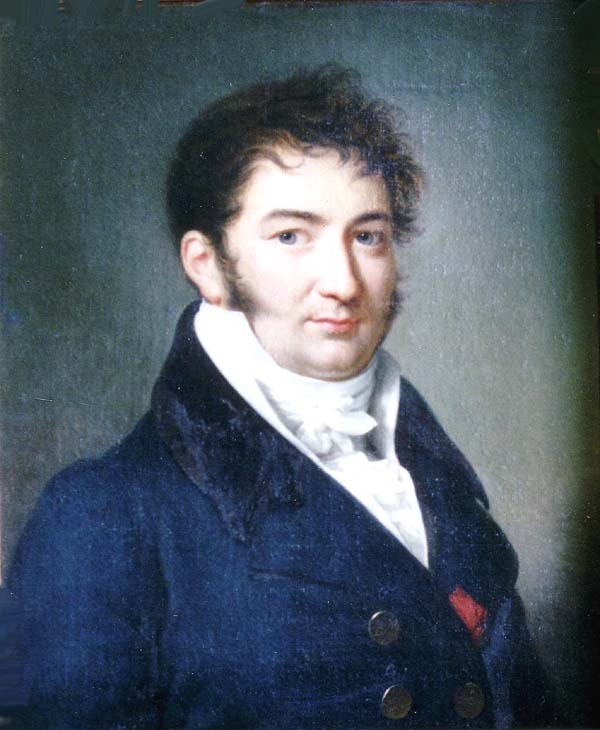
Victurnien Bonaventure de Rochechouart de Mortemart by François-Louis Gounod, 1810

François-Louis Gounod (26 March 1758 – 5 May 1825) was a French painter.

Gounod is primarily known through his works. He took second prize of the Prix de Rome in 1783. He married a piano teacher, and his son Charles Gounod became an award-winning composer.
