= The Combat: Woman Pleading for the Vanquished =

1825 oil painting by William Etty

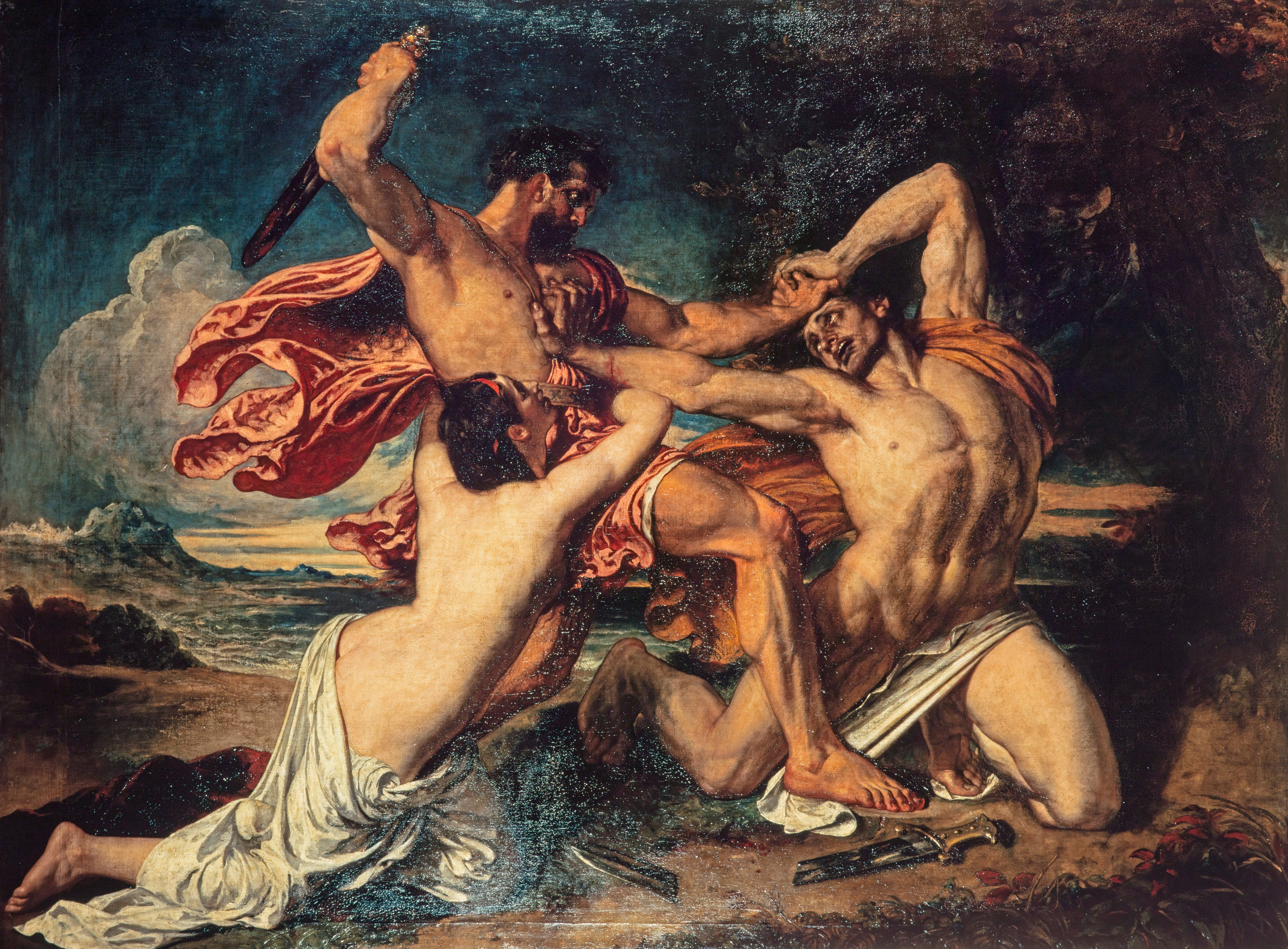
- Artist: William Etty
- Year: 1825
- Type: oil painting
- Dimensions: 3.04 m × 3.99 m (120 in × 157 in)
- Location: National Galleries of Scotland,

The Combat: Woman Pleading for the Vanquished is a large oil painting on canvas by English artist William Etty, first exhibited in 1825 and now in the National Gallery of Scotland. Inspired by the Elgin Marbles and intended by the artist to provide a moral lesson on "the beauty of mercy", it shows a near-nude warrior whose sword has broken, forced to his knees in front of another near-nude soldier who prepares to inflict a killing blow. A woman, also near-nude, clutches the victorious warrior to beg him for mercy. In a departure from other history paintings of the period, The Combat does not depict a scene from history, literature or religion and is not based on an existing artwork, but is instead a scene from the artist's own imagination.

When the painting was shown at the Royal Academy Summer Exhibition of 1825, it attracted near-universal praise from critics for its technical excellence, its fusion of the styles of different schools of painting, and its subject matter. Nevertheless, it failed to find a buyer at the Summer Exhibition, and was instead bought by fellow artist John Martin. The painting proved too large for Martin's house, and in 1831 he sold it on to the Royal Scottish Academy. It was transferred in 1910 to the National Gallery of Scotland, where it remains.

== Background ==
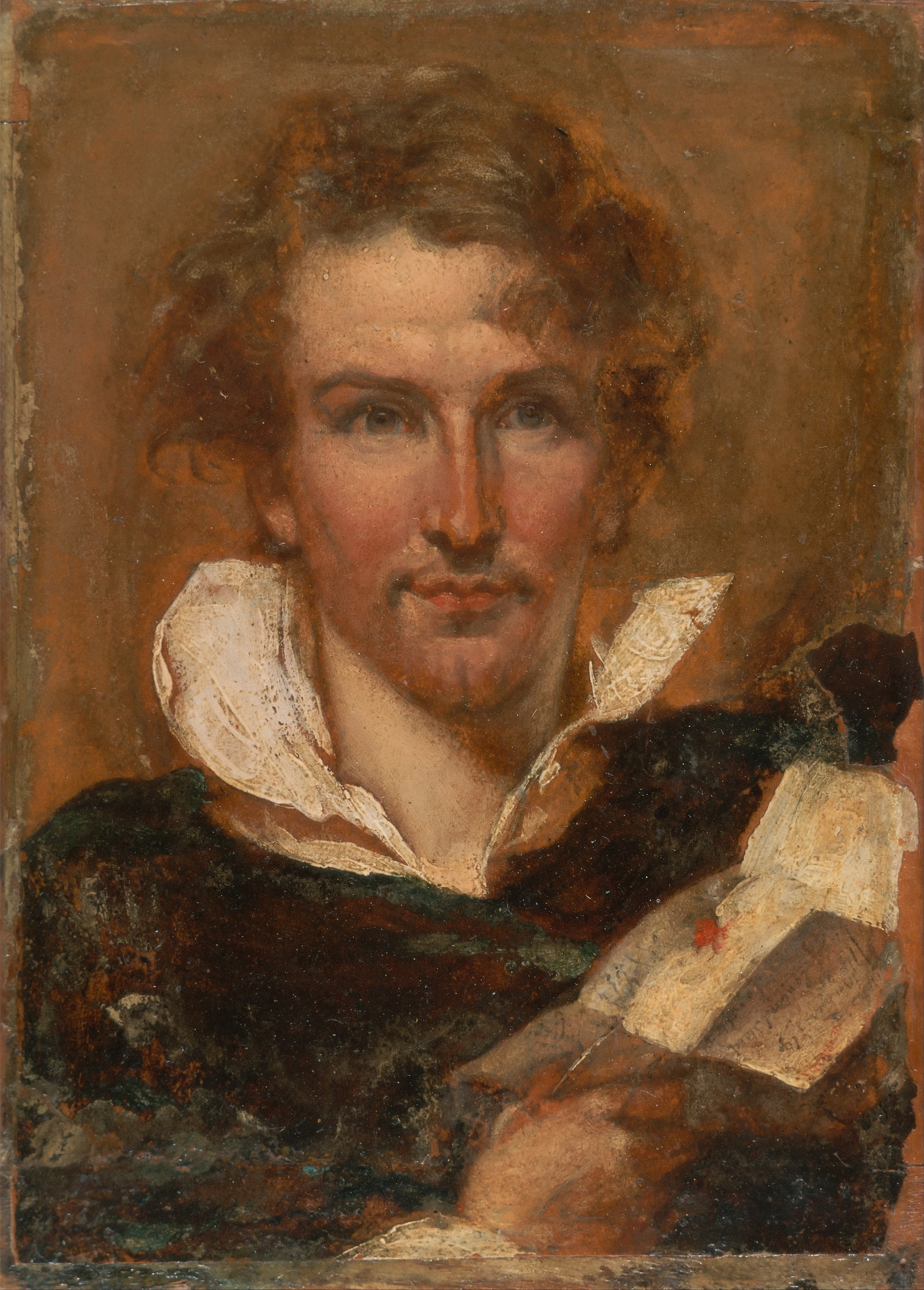
William Etty, in 1823, shortly before The Combat was painted

William Etty was born in 1787, the son of a York baker and miller. He began as an apprentice printer in Hull. On completing his seven-year apprenticeship he moved at the age of 18 to London "with a few pieces of chalk crayons", with the intention of becoming a history painter in the tradition of the Old Masters. Strongly influenced by the works of Titian and Rubens, he submitted paintings to the Royal Academy of Arts and the British Institution, all of which were either rejected or received scant attention when exhibited.

In 1821 the Royal Academy accepted and exhibited one of Etty's works, The Arrival of Cleopatra in Cilicia (also known as The Triumph of Cleopatra). The painting was extremely well received, and many of Etty's fellow artists greatly admired him. Following the praise for Cleopatra, Etty tried to replicate its success by painting nude figures in biblical, literary and mythological settings, most notably A Sketch from One of Gray's Odes (Youth on the Prow) in 1822, (Note: A Sketch from one of Gray's Odes was later developed into 1828's Youth on the Prow, and Pleasure at the Helm, one of Etty's best known works.) and the controversial Pandora Crowned by the Seasons in 1824. Etty had travelled extensively in Italy in 1823, and painted Pandora hastily on his return as a "testimonial of recent progress" he had made while studying paintings in Italian collections. Critical opinion of Pandora was highly divided, with some critics greatly praising it as a technical accomplishment, while others saw it as a rushed pastiche of Titian and Rubens. Pandora Crowned by the Seasons sold for 300 guineas (about £30,000 in 2025 terms), and secured Etty the position of Associate at the Royal Academy of Arts.

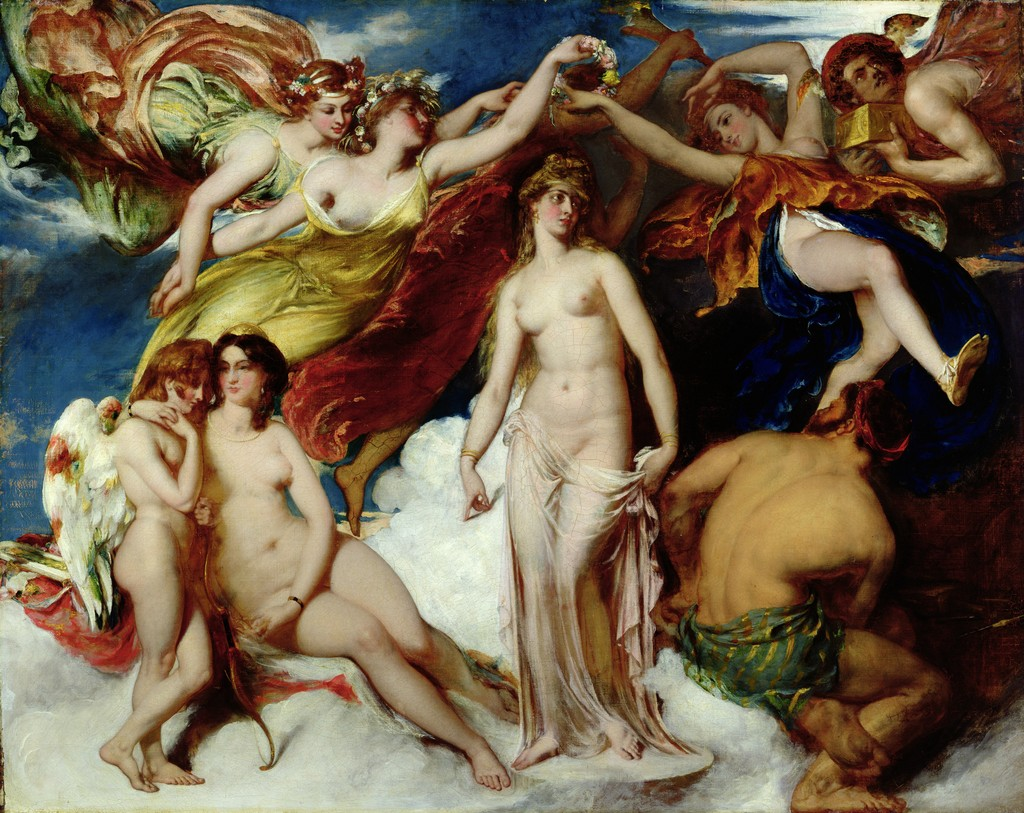
Pandora Crowned by the Seasons (1824) helped cement Etty's reputation for pastiche of Rubens and Titian, and for the use of mythological and literary subjects as a pretext for nudity.

While some nudes by foreign artists were held in private English collections, the country had no tradition of nude painting and the display and distribution of nude material to the public had been suppressed since the 1787 Proclamation for the Discouragement of Vice. Etty was the first British artist to specialise in the nude, and the reaction of the lower classes to these paintings caused concern throughout the 19th century. Many critics condemned his repeated depictions of female nudity as indecent, although his portraits of male nudes were generally well received.

== Composition ==
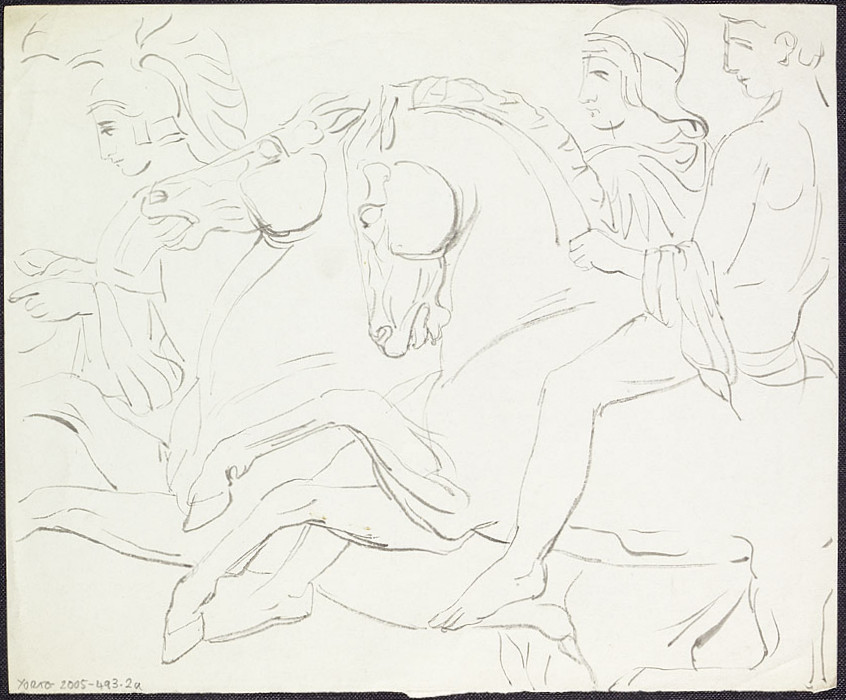
Sketch from the Elgin Marbles by William Etty. Etty was fascinated with the scenes of combat depicted by the Marbles, which had recently been put on display in London.

Etty was fascinated with classical artworks such as those he had seen during his recent travels in Italy, and in particular with the Elgin Marbles, a set of major Ancient Greek sculptures taken to London in controversial circumstances in the early 19th century.

The Combat: Woman Pleading for the Vanquished is a large painting, 399 cm (13 ft 1 in) across. It depicts a defeated soldier, kneeling in front of another soldier. The defeated fighter strains to free himself from the grip of the victorious warrior, who stands, raising a sword. A kneeling woman clutches the waist of the victorious soldier, raising her face to him to beg him to spare his defeated foe. The defeated warrior has a stronger body, a face more in keeping with the conventions of attractiveness at the time, and a more sympathetic expression, while the victorious man is darker skinned and has an expression of blank fierceness. The vanquished soldier's sword has broken, and lies beside him on the ground.

Etty did not base The Combat on any single incident from history or literature, or on any existing artwork, but on his own imagination; this was a highly unusual step to take regarding history paintings, which generally depicted themes from literature or religion. (Note: In 1832 Etty returned to the idea of a history painting drawn entirely from imagination with The Destroying Angel and Daemons of Evil Interrupting the Orgies of the Vicious and Intemperate, which he described as "a finished sketch of that class of compositions called by the Romans Visions, not having their origin in history or poetry.") He had been considering the topic as early as 1821, and his plans took shape following his visit to Italy. During this visit Etty had met Antonio Canova and been very impressed by him; The Combat is clearly influenced by his work. As well as drawing inspiration from classical sculpture, he was also strongly influenced by the composition of Old Master works he had seen while in Italy. As with many of Etty's works, the models posed for him separately in his studio, rather than as a group.

Etty, writing in 1849, described the purpose of The Combat as "to paint a great moral on the heart [of] the beauty of mercy." Etty's 1958 biographer Dennis Farr points out similarities in the composition of The Combat and John Flaxman's drawing Heracles Killing a Man to whom a Woman Clings – but while Etty and Flaxman were contemporaries at the Royal Academy, it is not known if Etty was aware of this drawing. (Note: Flaxman was also from York. When Etty was eventually elected a Royal Academician in 1828, it was to fill the vacancy created by Flaxman's death two years earlier.)

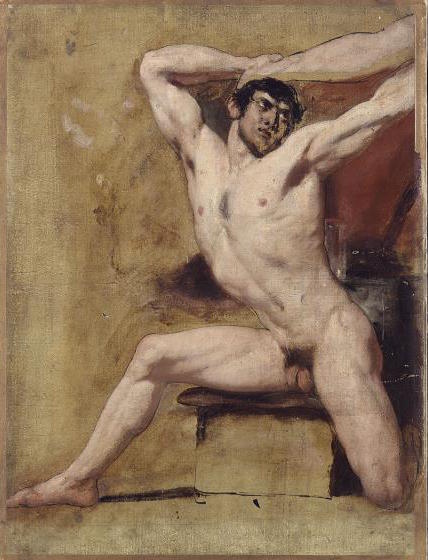
In the preliminary study for the defeated warrior, the character bears a more defiant expression and posture than seen in the finished version.

In the initial oil study for the defeated warrior (York Art Gallery), Etty gave the character a more defiant appearance than seen in the finished version. In this preliminary sketch he is not on his knees, but thrusts his leg out to brace himself. He has an expression of defiance and determination, rather than the plea for mercy and posture of total defeat shown in the final work.

The completed The Combat: Woman Pleading for the Vanquished was exhibited at the Royal Academy Summer Exhibition in 1825.

== Reception ==
On its exhibition, The Combat was generally highly praised by critics for its technical excellence, its combination of the Venetian and English styles of painting, and as an indication that Etty was moving away from nudity and towards history painting. The European Magazine, and London Review commented that "in colour this picture strongly reminds us of the great heroes of the Venetian school, while in learned intelligence of form, and energy of action, it greatly surpasses them", observing that "we should not have the least objection to seeing this picture placed in one of the very first galleries, by the side of Titian and Paul Veronese."

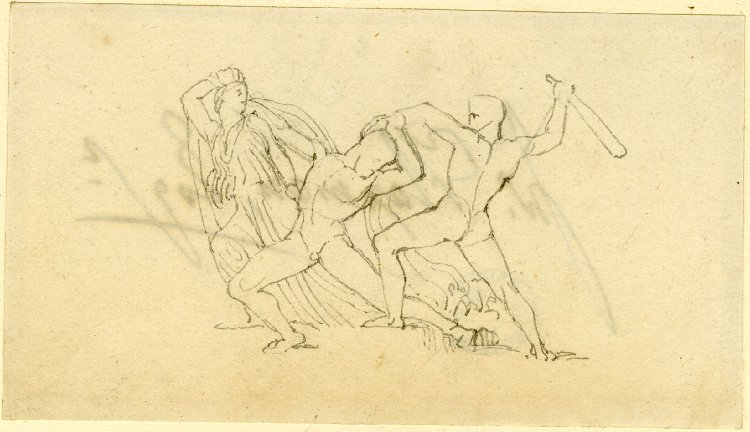
Heracles Killing a Man to whom a Woman Clings, by John Flaxman, which possibly influenced the composition of The Combat

In similar vein, The Lady's Magazine felt that The Combat "strongly demonstrates the progress of [Etty] to excellence", remarking that "never was a groupe more calculated to display the action in which the power of conquest is so eminently and fearfully delineated" and that "we have little doubt that the works of Titian were, on their first appearance ... what this piece is now." The same correspondent did find some flaws in the overly pronounced muscles of the victor's thigh and the lack of definition of muscle in the legs of the defeated man, but felt that despite this The Combat was "one of the finest and most masterly works that ever graced the walls of the Royal Academy."

The London Magazine was similarly effusive about the painting, admiring Etty's ability to fuse his own imagination with themes derived from the Elgin Marbles and from the Venetian Old Masters, and commenting that "it is always gratifying to those who feel for the honour and independence of painting when, as in the present instance, an artist successfully relies on nature and the resources of his own mind for his subject, and on the appreciation of collegial minds for his mode of treating it." The Times, a newspaper which had previously condemned Etty as "offensive and indecent", felt that "though defective in some respects" The Combat was "a masterly effort" that successfully fused "the florid beauties of the Venetian school" with the "sober dignity and power of the Roman school" and that compared with his previous paintings, which were "too uniformly feeble in character and meretricious in effect to entitle them to any very decided praise", the painting proved Etty "capable of maintaining a much higher station in art than we had been led to expect."

An anonymous reviewer in the first issue of the short-lived The Parthenon magazine admired The Combat greatly, in particular the right foot of the female figure:

[Etty is] an artist who has hitherto appeared before the public only in a few small easel-pictures, striking indeed from their arrangement, and their approach towards the Venetian system of colour, but destitute of any particular interest. He has now come forward in a new character – as a painter in the great style of epic composition; and if his future efforts do but equal the expectations raised by his first essay, we shall have reasons to rejoice at the change. His ideal group of "The Combat", in the present exhibition at the Royal Academy, is particularly striking, from its uncommon combination of beauties, without possessing any very extraordinary merit in any single quality, taken separately. Its style of colouring, perhaps, forms its most distinguishing feature; and in this respect the artist has still adhered closely to the system pursued by the Venetian school. The arrangement of his colours is admirably successful, and we could instance individual passages of extraordinary beauty. Of these, none is more eminently deserving than the right foot of the female, which seems actually to glow with the rich juice of life. Generally speaking, the extremities are well understood, and carefully executed, and the composition of the figures is in the most masterly style.

— The Parthenon review of The Combat, 11 June 1825

The foot in question was not universally admired by critics; the anonymous correspondent for The London Magazine, who was otherwise effusive in his praise for The Combat, felt that said foot "looks too much as if painted from a modern foot accustomed to compression in a shoe, for the heroic character and classical air of the rest of the work" and that her leg appeared too short. (Note: Dennis Farr believes that the slight distortion of the female figure is the result of Etty standing too close to the model in the studio.)

The painting is the subject of one of Letitia Elizabeth Landon's Poetical Sketches of Modern Pictures in her 1826 collection, The Troubadour.

== Legacy ==
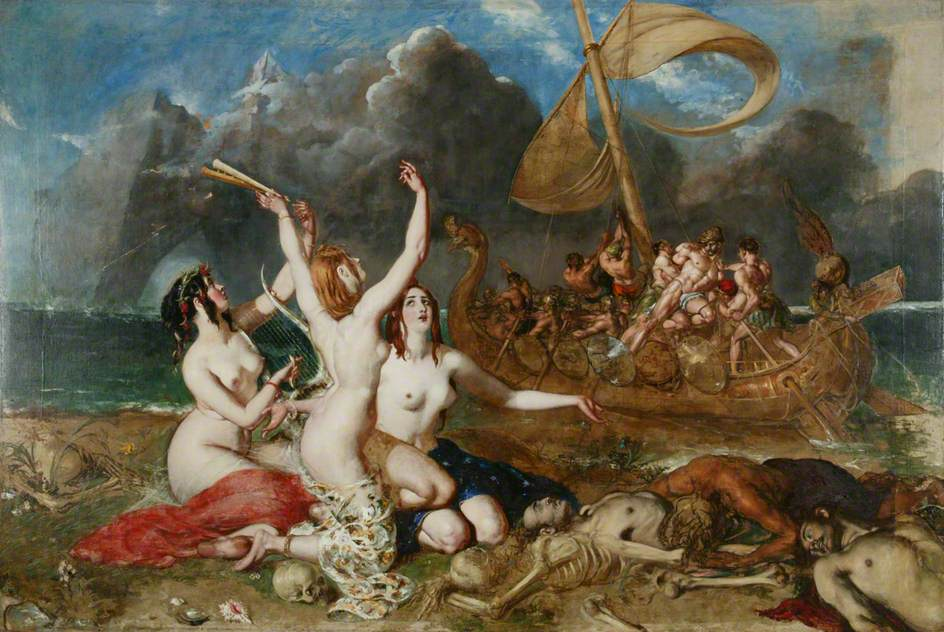
The success of The Combat prompted Etty to produce other very large paintings, such as The Sirens and Ulysses (1837).

Failing to sell at the Summer Exhibition, The Combat was bought from Etty by fellow artist John Martin for 300 guineas (about £24,000 in 2025 terms), following a promise Martin had made to Etty before the painting was complete. (Note: Alison Smith's 1996 The Victorian Nude states that The Combat was bought at exhibition by John Bligh, 4th Earl of Darnley, but this is incorrect; Darnley admired The Combat and commissioned Etty to paint The Judgement of Paris having seen The Combat at the Royal Academy.) The painting was too large for Martin's house, and in 1831 he sold it on to the Royal Scottish Academy. It was transferred in 1910 to the nearby National Gallery of Scotland where it remains. One of Etty's major works, it was exhibited at numerous major exhibitions including the seminal Art Treasures Exhibition of 1857, before Etty fell out of fashion in the second half of the 19th century.

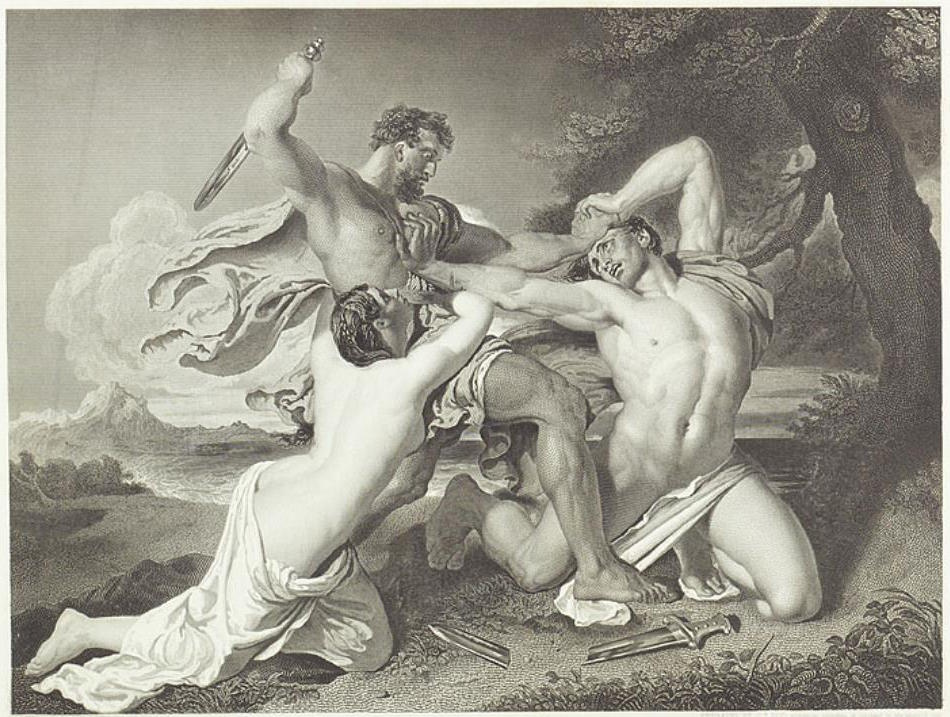
Engraving by G. T. Doo, 1848, based on a reworked version of the painting completed by Etty in 1845

Throughout his life, The Combat continued to be considered one of Etty's most powerful paintings. In 1845, Etty took a smaller 89 by 118 cm (35 by 46 in) copy of The Combat, which had been painted by an unknown Edinburgh artist, and completely reworked it to serve as the basis for an engraving by George Thomas Doo. The engraving was published three years later, and the painting used as its model passed through the hands of several collectors in subsequent years, before entering the collection of the Ringling Museum in 1934. A number of sketches attributed to Etty, under the name of A Study for Mercy Interceding for the Vanquished, are also in circulation.

After the success of The Combat, Etty continued with his preferred theme of history paintings containing nudity; of the 15 pictures he exhibited at the Royal Academy during the 1820s (including Cleopatra, Pandora and The Combat) all but one contained a nude figure. He was elected a full Royal Academician in 1828, at that time the most prestigious honour available to an artist. (Note: In Etty's time, honours such as knighthoods were bestowed only on presidents of major institutions, not on even the most well respected artists.) The Combat was the first very large work attempted by Etty, and its success prompted him to produce further works on a similar scale over the rest of his career; he produced nine very large paintings illustrating moral themes throughout his career. As time went by his canvases came to be increasingly dominated by nude women.

The 1832 exhibition of Youth on the Prow, and Pleasure at the Helm, a painting containing apparently gratuitous nude figures, met a hostile reception from critics. From then on, while Etty continued to paint nude figures for the rest of his career, he made a conscious effort to try to illustrate moral lessons with his work. This effort was not wholly successful, and he continued to be regarded as a pornographer by some throughout his career. He died in late 1849, and following his death nude paintings went rapidly out of fashion in Britain.

== Notes and references ==
=== Bibliography ===
- Burnage, Sarah (2011a). "Etty and the Masters". In Burnage, Sarah; Hallett, Mark; Turner, Laura (eds.). William Etty: Art & Controversy. London: Philip Wilson Publishers. pp. 154–97. ISBN 978-0-85667-701-4. OCLC 800599710.
- Burnage, Sarah (2011b). "History Painting and the Critics". In Burnage, Sarah; Hallett, Mark; Turner, Laura (eds.). William Etty: Art & Controversy. London: Philip Wilson Publishers. pp. 106–54. ISBN 978-0-85667-701-4. OCLC 800599710.
- Burnage, Sarah (2011c). "The Life Class". In Burnage, Sarah; Hallett, Mark; Turner, Laura (eds.). William Etty: Art & Controversy. London: Philip Wilson Publishers. pp. 198–227. ISBN 978-0-85667-701-4. OCLC 800599710.
- Burnage, Sarah (2011d). "Painting the Nude and 'Inflicting Divine Vengeance on the Wicked'". In Burnage, Sarah; Hallett, Mark; Turner, Laura (eds.). William Etty: Art & Controversy. London: Philip Wilson Publishers. pp. 31–46. ISBN 978-0-85667-701-4. OCLC 800599710.
- Burnage, Sarah; Bertram, Beatrice (2011). "Chronology". In Burnage, Sarah; Hallett, Mark; Turner, Laura (eds.). William Etty: Art & Controversy. London: Philip Wilson Publishers. pp. 20–30. ISBN 978-0-85667-701-4. OCLC 800599710.
- Farr, Dennis (1958). William Etty. London: Routledge and Kegan Paul. OCLC 2470159.
- Gilchrist, Alexander (1855). Life of William Etty, R.A. Vol. 2. London: David Bogue. OCLC 2135826.
- Robinson, Leonard (2007). William Etty: The Life and Art. Jefferson, NC: McFarland & Company. ISBN 978-0-7864-2531-0. OCLC 751047871.
- Smith, Alison (1996). The Victorian Nude. Manchester: Manchester University Press. ISBN 978-0-7190-4403-8. OCLC 36208423.
- Smith, Alison (2001a). Exposed: The Victorian Nude. London: Tate Publishing. ISBN 978-1-85437-372-4. OCLC 52102470.
- Smith, Alison (2001b). "Private Pleasures?". In Bills, Mark (ed.). Art in the Age of Queen Victoria: A Wealth of Depictions. Bournemouth: Russell–Cotes Art Gallery and Museum. ISBN 978-0-905173-65-8. OCLC 50312858.
