= The Harbour of Dieppe =

Painting by J. M. W. Turner

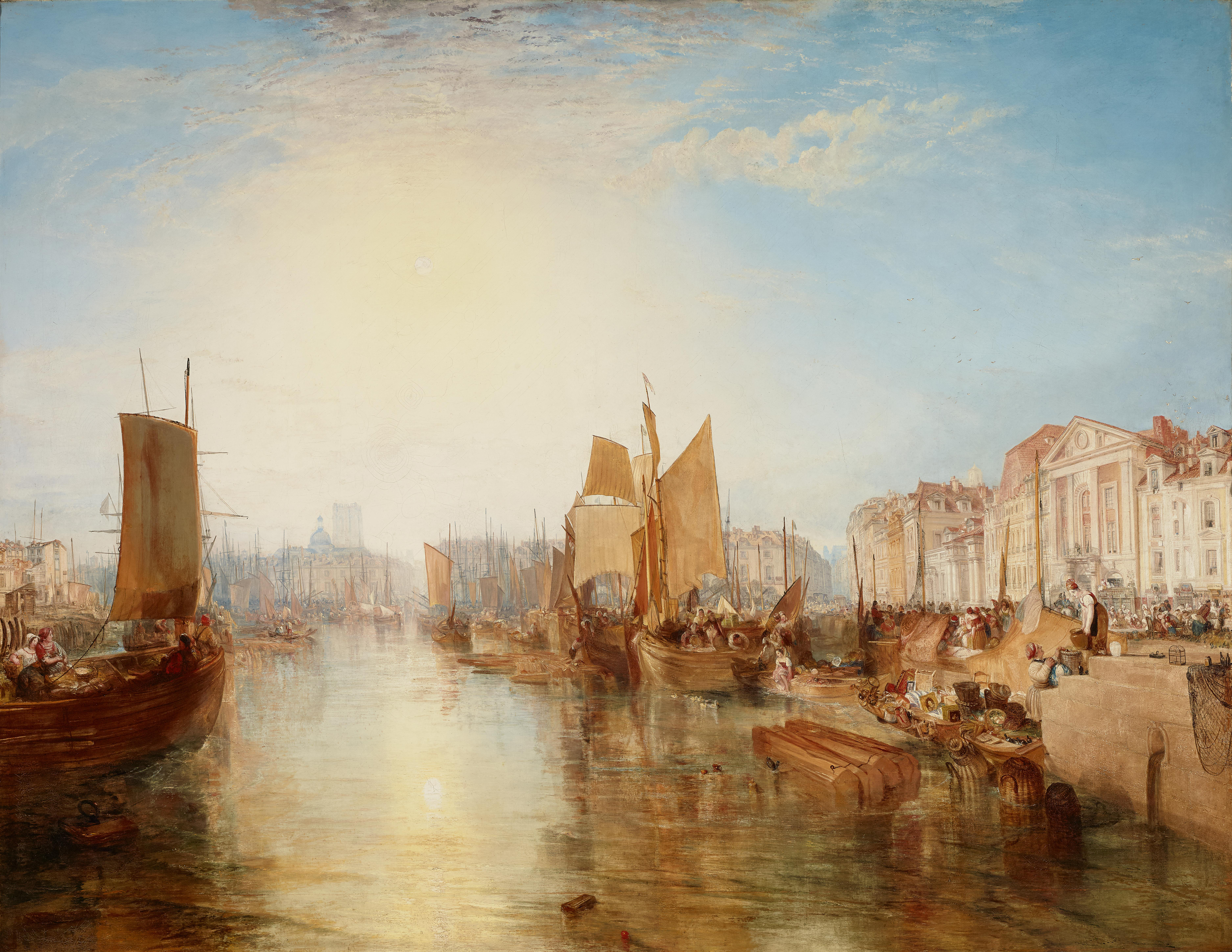
- Artist: J. M. W. Turner
- Year: 1825
- Type: Oil on canvas, landscape
- Dimensions: 173.7 cm × 225.4 cm (68.4 in × 88.7 in)
- Location: Frick Collection, New York City
- Website: collections.frick.org/...0040:268

The Harbour of Dieppe is an 1825 landscape painting by the English artist J.M.W. Turner. It portrays a view of the harbour of Dieppe, a seaport on the Normandy coast of France.

It was displayed at the Royal Academy's Summer Exhibition of 1825 at Somerset House. A review in The Literary Magnet suggested Turner had produced "a brilliant experiment in colours, which displays all the magic of skill at the expense of all the magic of nature", both praising his artistic talents but criticising the lack of naturalism. Today it is in the Frick Collection in New York.

== See also ==
- List of paintings by J. M. W. Turner

== Bibliography ==
- Bailey, Anthony. J.M.W. Turner: Standing in the Sun. Tate Enterprises Ltd, 2013.
- Costello, Leo. J.M.W. Turner and the Subject of History. Taylor and Francis, 2017.
- Hamilton, James. Turner's Britain. Merrell, 2003.
- Powell, Cecelia. Turner's Rivers of Europe: The Rhine, Meuse and Mosel. Tate Gallery, 1991
- Reynolds, Graham. Turner. Thames & Hudson, 2022.
- Wilton, Andrew. J.M.W. Turner: France, Italy, Germany, Switzerland. Braziller, 1982.
