= Dawn of Love =

Dawn of Love may refer to:

- The Dawn of Love (painting), oil painting by English artist William Etty
- The Dawn of Love (film), 1916 American film
- Sons of Ingmar, or Dawn of Love, 1919 Swedish film
