= The Dawn of Love (painting) =

Oil painting on canvas by English artist William Etty

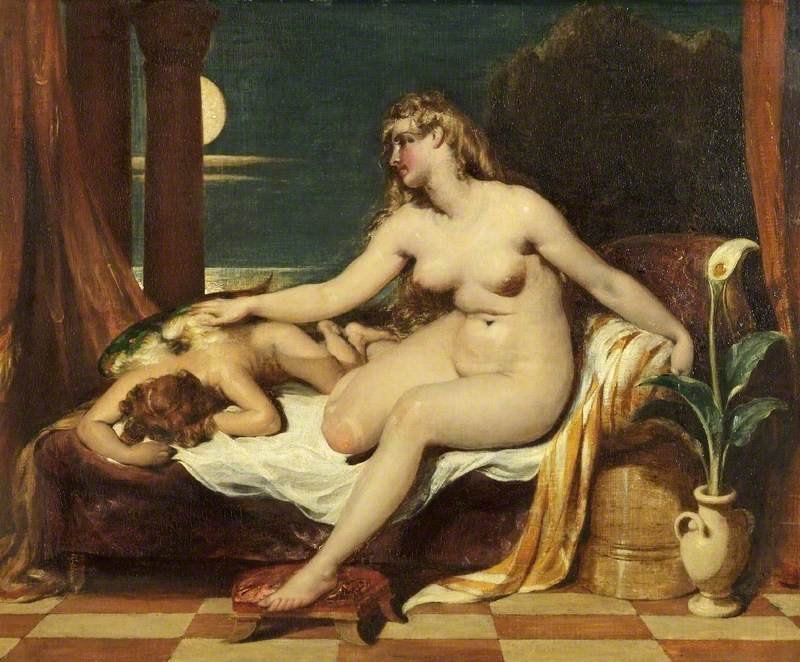
- Artist: William Etty
- Year: 1828
- Medium: oil paint on canvas
- Subject: Venus
- Dimensions: 88.6 cm × 98 cm (34.9 in × 39 in)
- Location: Russell-Cotes Art Gallery and Museum, Bournemouth

The Dawn of Love, also known as Venus Now Wakes, and Wakens Love, is an oil painting on canvas by English artist William Etty, first exhibited in 1828 and currently in the Russell-Cotes Art Gallery & Museum in Bournemouth. Loosely based on a passage from John Milton's 1634 masque Comus, it shows a nude Venus leaning across to wake the sleeping Love by stroking his wings. While Etty often included nude figures in his work, he rarely depicted physical intimacy, and owing to this, The Dawn of Love is one of his more unusual paintings. The open sensuality of the work was intended to present a challenge to the viewer mirroring the plot of Comus, in which the heroine is tempted by desire but remains rational and detached.

While a few critics praised elements of its composition and execution, The Dawn of Love was very poorly received when first exhibited. Etty had developed a reputation for painting realistic figures, and his stylised Venus was thought unduly influenced by foreign artists such as Rubens as well as being overly voluptuous and unrealistically coloured, while the painting as a whole was considered tasteless and obscene. The Dawn of Love was not among the 133 paintings exhibited in the major 1849 retrospective exhibition of Etty's works, and its exhibition in Glasgow in 1899 drew complaints for its supposed obscenity. In 1889 it was bought by Sir Merton Russell-Cotes, and has remained in the collection of the Russell-Cotes Art Gallery & Museum ever since.

== Background ==
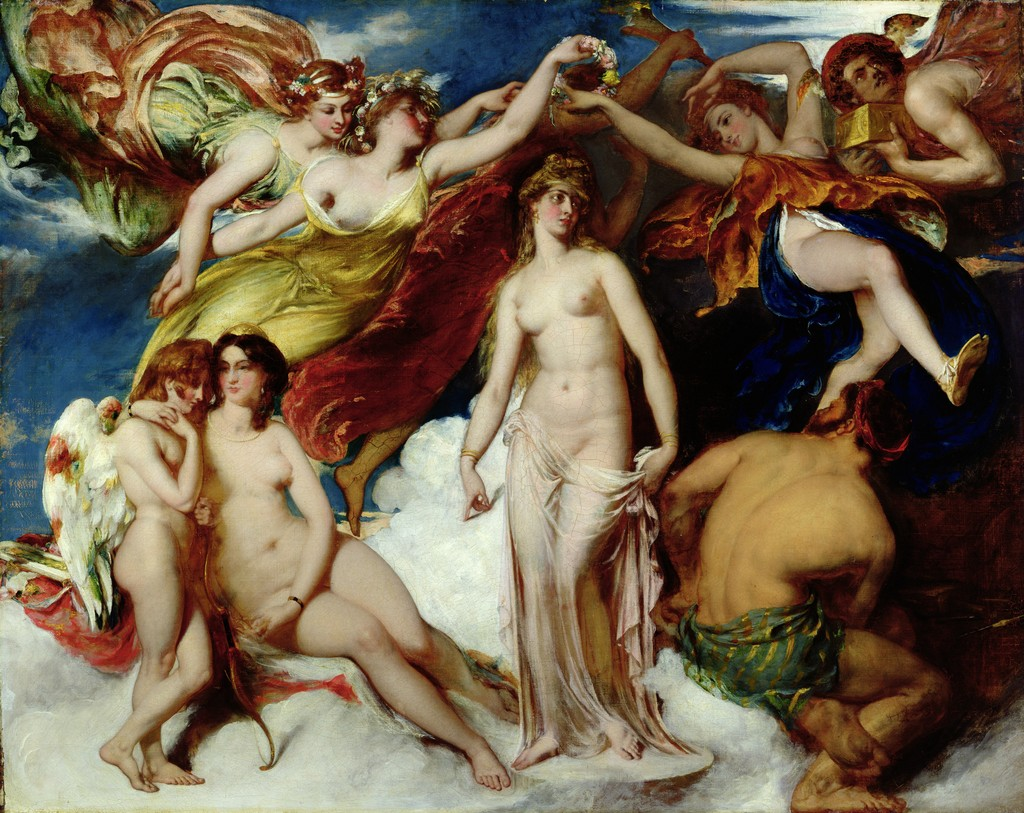
Pandora Crowned by the Seasons (1824). Following the success of Cleopatra, Etty tried to replicate its success with further history paintings containing nude figures.

William Etty was born in 1787, the son of a York baker and miller. He began as an apprentice printer in Hull. On completing his seven-year apprenticeship he moved at the age of 18 to London "with a few pieces of chalk crayons", with the intention of becoming a history painter in the tradition of the Old Masters. He enrolled at the Royal Academy, and after a year spent studying under renowned portrait painter Thomas Lawrence, Etty returned to the Royal Academy, drawing at the life class and copying other paintings. A follower of John Opie, who promoted the unfashionable painting style of Titian and Rubens over the then-prevalent formal style of Joshua Reynolds, Etty was unsuccessful in all the academy's competitions and every work he submitted to the Royal Academy Summer Exhibition in the 1810s was rejected. In 1821 the Royal Academy accepted and exhibited one of Etty's works in the Summer Exhibition, The Arrival of Cleopatra in Cilicia (also known as The Triumph of Cleopatra). This painting was extremely well received, and many of Etty's fellow artists greatly admired him. He became well respected for his ability to capture flesh tones accurately in painting, and for his fascination with contrasts in skin tones. Following the exhibition of Cleopatra, over the next decade Etty tried to replicate its success by painting nude figures in biblical, literary and mythological settings.

While some nudes by foreign artists were held in private English collections, the country had no tradition of nude painting and the display and distribution of nude material to the public had been suppressed since the 1787 Proclamation for the Discouragement of Vice. Etty was the first British artist to specialise in the nude, and the reaction of the lower classes to these paintings caused concern throughout the 19th century. Many critics condemned his repeated depictions of female nudity as indecent, although his portraits of male nudes were generally well received. (Note: Etty's male nude portraits were primarily of mythological heroes and classical combat, genres in which the depiction of male nudity was considered acceptable in England.)

== Composition ==
And on the tawny sands and shelves
Trip the pert fairies and the dapper elves
By dimpled brook and fountain-brim
The wood-nymphs, decked with daisies trim
Their merry wakes and pastimes keep;
What hath night to do with sleep?
Night hath better sweets to prove,
Venus now wakes, and wakens Love.
Come, let us our rites begin;
'Tis only day-light that makes sin
Which these dun shades will ne'er report.
Hail! Goddess of nocturnal sport.

— Comus, lines 117–28

The Dawn of Love illustrates an early passage from Comus, a 1634 masque by John Milton. Comus is a morality tale in which the female protagonist, referred to only as "The Lady", becomes separated from her family. She encounters the debauched magician Comus who captures and imprisons her, and uses all the means at his disposal to try to inflame her sexual desires. The Lady resists all temptation, and using her reason and sense of morals resists Comus's efforts to draw her into intemperance or surrender to desire.

Etty's painting is not a direct illustration of a scene from Comus. Instead, it is inspired by an early passage in which Comus, prior to his meeting with The Lady, muses on the notion that sin is only problematic if others become aware of it, and thus that it is right and natural to surrender to base desires while under cover of darkness, arguing that "What hath night to do with sleep? Night hath better sweets to prove, Venus now wakes, and wakens Love". Etty's painting shows the nude Venus, as "Goddess of nocturnal sport", reaching across to wake the sleeping Love by stroking his wings. While Etty had built his reputation on his renowned ability to paint realistic human figures, Venus in The Dawn of Love is highly stylised, and painted in a deliberate pastiche of the style of Rubens.

The Dawn of Love intentionally presents a moral dilemma to viewers. By his open depiction of nudity and sensuality, Etty makes the same argument as that presented by Comus, that it is rational for the viewer to succumb to their lustful thoughts while in private. The picture presents the same moral challenge to the viewer as that which Comus presents to The Lady, that of remaining true to her better, moral and rational, nature, despite there being no apparent disadvantage in surrendering to desire.

While Etty regularly painted nudity, he rarely depicted physical intimacy other than in combat, and The Dawn of Love is unusual among his works; Etty's biographer Leonard Robinson commented in 2007 that The Dawn of Love "is a subject so untypical of Etty that one finds difficulty in understanding why he painted it".

== Reception ==
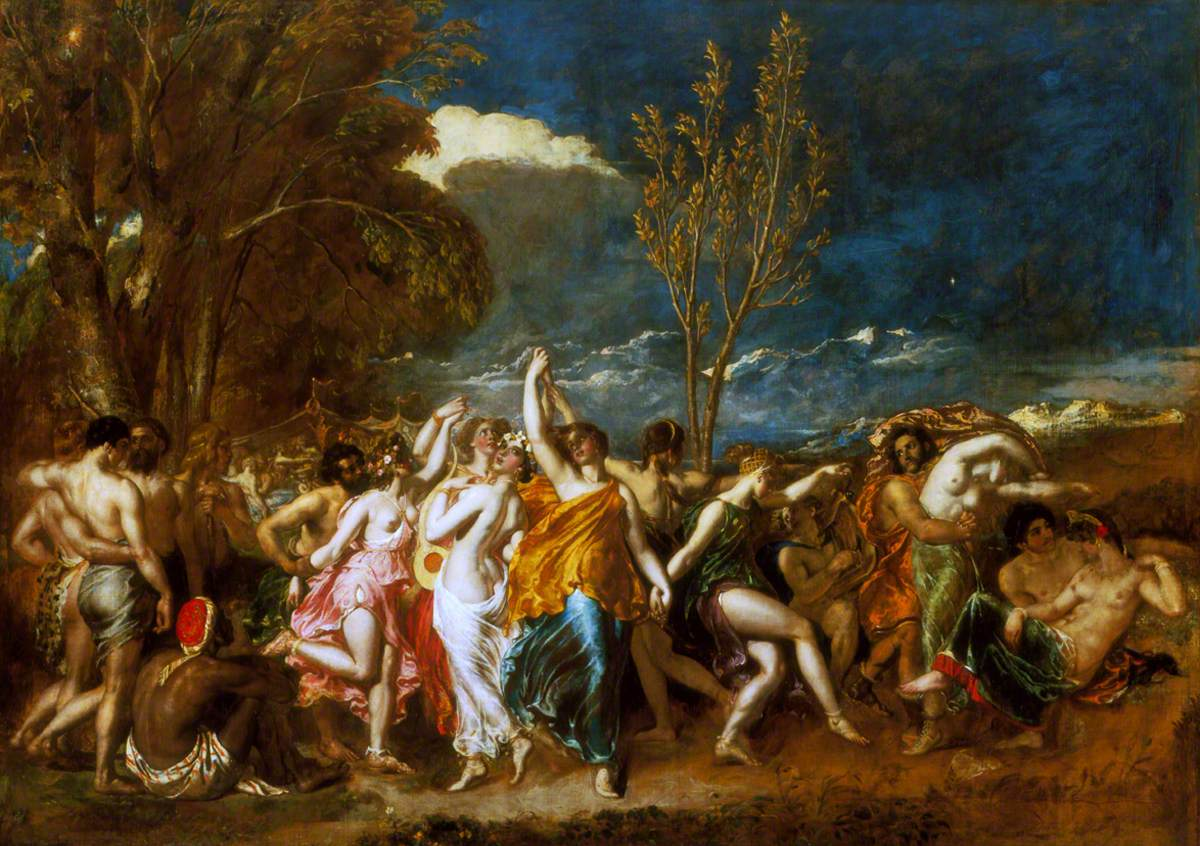
Etty's The World Before the Flood, exhibited later in 1828, also illustrated Milton, in this case Paradise Lost.

Etty exhibited the painting in February 1828 at the British Institution under the title of Venus Now Wakes, and Wakens Love. It immediately met with a storm of derision from critics for the style in which Venus was painted; one of the few positive reviews was that of The New Monthly Magazine, whose critic considered "the figure of Venus is delightfully drawn and most voluptuously coloured; and the way in which she awakens love, by ruffling the feathers of his wings, is exquisitely imagined and executed". The Times commented that "the drawing is free and flowing" and "the colouring, though rich, is perfectly natural", but felt that "the subject is, however, handled in a way entirely too luscious (we might, with great propriety, use a harsher term) for the public eye". The Literary Gazette conceded that the painting was "very attractive, especially in colour", but considered the painting's "voluptuousness" as "one of the most unpardonable sins against taste", and chided Etty's "careless" drawing, observing that "it is impossible that an artist who has for so many years, and so unremittingly, studied the living model, can err in that respect from want of knowledge". The Monthly Magazine complained of Venus's "sullen colour and corpulent shape", as well as Etty's "excessive exposure of [Venus's] figure". La Belle Assemblée, meanwhile, felt that Etty's representation of Venus "though a fine voluptuous woman, is not, either in supremacy of beauty, or according to any received description of the love-inspiring goddess, a Venus", and complained that "the colouring of the flesh is chalky".

The harshest criticism came from an anonymous reviewer in The London Magazine:

This small picture ... we utterly condemn, not for the nudity or indecency of which some have complained, but because there is a total want of beauty, grace, and expression, to clothe the nakedness and abstract the mind from it. Mr. Etty seems conscious of the coldness of his flesh-colour, and atones for it by the flabbiness of his figures. They are any thing but voluptuous or alluring. We would recommend to our artist to leave these small unfinished vignettes, these little doughy Rubenses as "toys of desperation" to others. His firm, broad, manly pencil, requires wider scope and a different subject.

— The London Magazine, April 1828

An anonymous reviewer in the same publication later that year returned to the theme, chiding Etty for his imitation of foreign artists rather than attempting to develop a new and unique style of his own, observing that "we cannot imitate the voice or the actions of another, without exaggerating or caricaturing them", complaining that there is "[no] propriety in seeing the Venuses of Titian, the fables of heathenism, or the base occupations of Dutch boors, placed in parallel with those subjects which form the basis [of] all our future hopes", and observing that "surely, Rubens ought here [in England] to be held up as rock to avoid, not a light to follow".

== Legacy ==
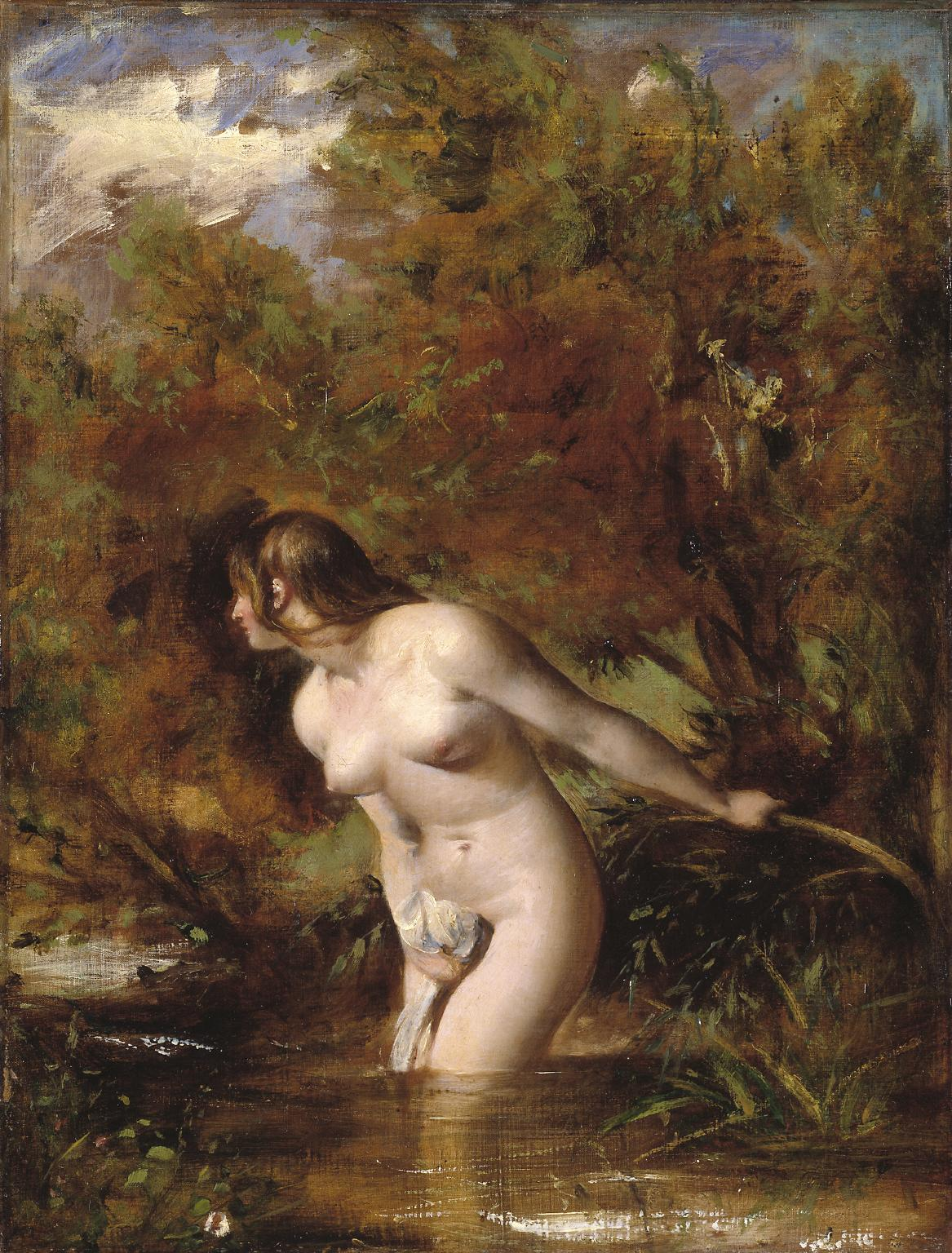
Musidora: The Bather 'At the Doubtful Breeze Alarmed' (exh. 1846). Etty continued to paint nudes throughout his career, but rarely again depicted physical intimacy.

In February 1828, shortly after the exhibition of The Dawn of Love, Etty defeated John Constable by 18 votes to five to become a full Royal Academician, at the time the highest honour available to an artist. (Note: In Etty's time, honours such as knighthoods were only bestowed on presidents of major institutions, not on even the most well respected artists.) From 1832 onwards, needled by repeated attacks from the press on his supposed indecency and tastelessness, Etty continued to be a prominent painter of nudes but began to make conscious efforts to reflect moral teachings in his work. He died in 1849, working and exhibiting up until his death and remained well-regarded as an artist despite being judged by many as a pornographer. Charles Robert Leslie observed shortly after Etty's death that "[Etty] himself, thinking and meaning no evil, was not aware of the manner in which his works were regarded by grosser minds". Interest in his work declined as new movements came to characterise painting in Britain, and by the end of the 19th century the cost of all his paintings had fallen below their original prices.

The Dawn of Love (under its original title of Venus Now Wakes, and Wakens Love) was exhibited in 1829 at the Birmingham Society of Arts, but other than that its history during Etty's lifetime is not recorded. No record of its original sale exists, and it was not among the 133 paintings included in the major retrospective exhibition of Etty's works at the Royal Society of Arts in 1849. It is known that in 1835 it was in the collection of textile entrepreneur Joseph Strutt, but it was not among the paintings sold on his death in 1844. In June 1889 it was bought from an unknown buyer for an unknown sum by Sir Merton Russell-Cotes, and has remained in the collection of the Russell-Cotes Art Gallery & Museum in Bournemouth ever since. It was shown at an 1899 exhibition of works from Russell-Cotes's collection at the Glasgow Corporation Gallery. This exhibition caused some controversy owing to its supposed obscene nature; in 1894 a number of supposedly obscene prints of works by major artists had been removed from a Glasgow shop by police and magistrates, and it was felt inappropriate for a publicly funded educational body to be displaying a work of equal obscenity. Several luminaries of the art world such as Frederic Leighton intervened, and the exhibition went ahead. The Dawn of Love was also exhibited at a 1955 Arts Council exhibition, and was one of the works exhibited in a major retrospective of Etty's works at the York Art Gallery in 2011–12.

== Sources ==
- Burnage, Sarah (2011a). "Etty and the Masters". In Burnage, Sarah; Hallett, Mark; Turner, Laura (eds.). William Etty: Art & Controversy. London: Philip Wilson Publishers. pp. 154–97. ISBN 978-0-85667-701-4. OCLC 800599710.
- Burnage, Sarah (2011b). "History Painting and the Critics". In Burnage, Sarah; Hallett, Mark; Turner, Laura (eds.). William Etty: Art & Controversy. London: Philip Wilson Publishers. pp. 106–54. ISBN 978-0-85667-701-4. OCLC 800599710.
- Burnage, Sarah (2011c). "The Life Class". In Burnage, Sarah; Hallett, Mark; Turner, Laura (eds.). William Etty: Art & Controversy. London: Philip Wilson Publishers. pp. 198–227. ISBN 978-0-85667-701-4. OCLC 800599710.
- Burnage, Sarah (2011d). "Painting the Nude and 'Inflicting Divine Vengeance on the Wicked'". In Burnage, Sarah; Hallett, Mark; Turner, Laura (eds.). William Etty: Art & Controversy. London: Philip Wilson Publishers. pp. 31–46. ISBN 978-0-85667-701-4. OCLC 800599710.
- Burnage, Sarah (2011e). "Portraiture". In Burnage, Sarah; Hallett, Mark; Turner, Laura (eds.). William Etty: Art & Controversy. London: Philip Wilson Publishers. pp. 228–50. ISBN 978-0-85667-701-4. OCLC 800599710.
- Burnage, Sarah; Bertram, Beatrice (2011). "Chronology". In Burnage, Sarah; Hallett, Mark; Turner, Laura (eds.). William Etty: Art & Controversy. London: Philip Wilson Publishers. pp. 20–30. ISBN 978-0-85667-701-4. OCLC 800599710.
- Farr, Dennis (1958). William Etty. London: Routledge and Kegan Paul. OCLC 2470159.
- Gilchrist, Alexander (1855). Life of William Etty, R.A. Vol. 1. London: David Bogue. OCLC 2135826.
- Green, Richard (2011). "Etty and the Masters". In Burnage, Sarah; Hallett, Mark; Turner, Laura (eds.). William Etty: Art & Controversy. London: Philip Wilson Publishers. pp. 61–74. ISBN 978-0-85667-701-4. OCLC 800599710.
- Robinson, Leonard (2007). William Etty: The Life and Art. Jefferson, North Carolina: McFarland & Company. ISBN 978-0-7864-2531-0. OCLC 751047871.
- Smith, Alison (2001a). Exposed: The Victorian Nude. London: Tate Publishing. ISBN 978-1-85437-372-4. OCLC 604088100.
- Smith, Alison (2001b). "Private Pleasures?". In Bills, Mark (ed.). Art in the Age of Queen Victoria: A Wealth of Depictions. Bournemouth: Russell–Cotes Art Gallery and Museum. pp. 53–67. ISBN 978-0-905173-65-8. OCLC 606665429.
- Smith, Alison (1996). The Victorian Nude. Manchester: Manchester University Press. ISBN 978-0-7190-4403-8. OCLC 902076112.
