= The World Before the Flood =

1828 painting by William Etty

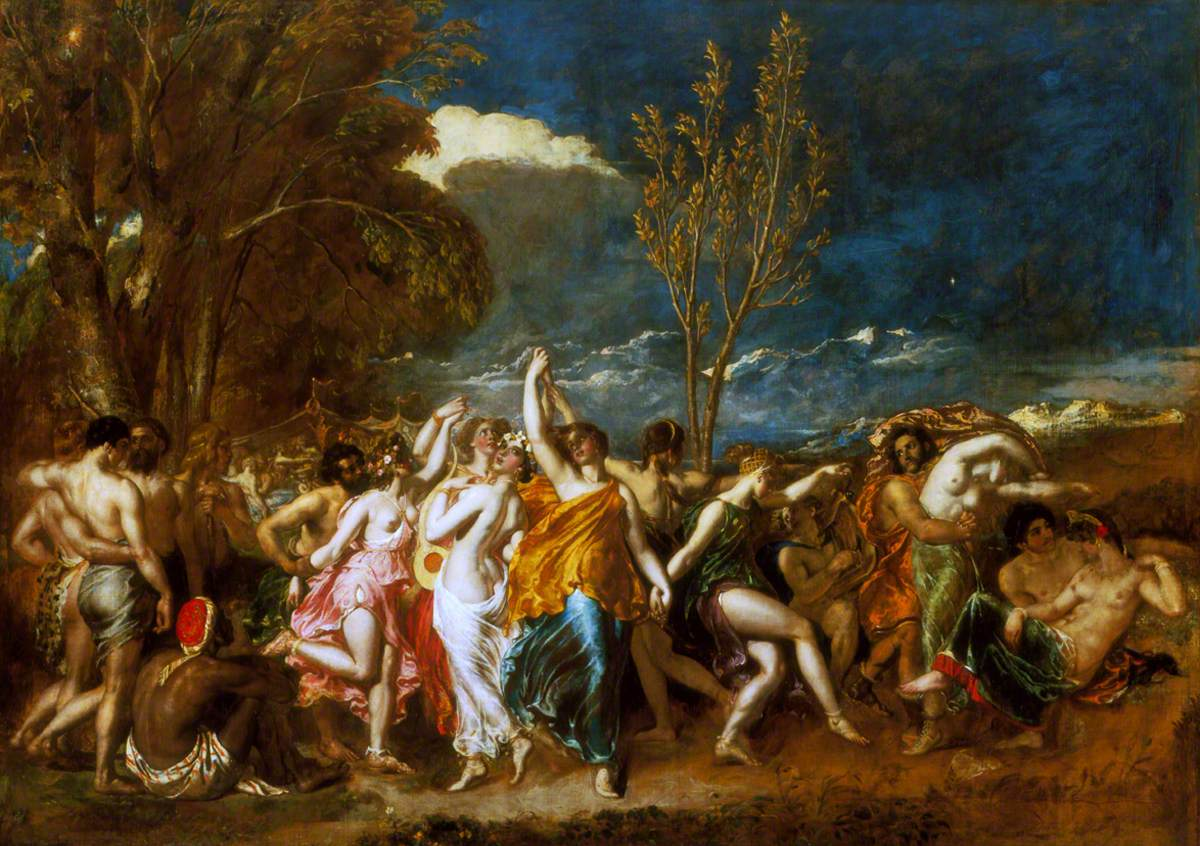
- The World Before the Flood, 1828, 140 by 202.3 cm (55.1 by 79.6 in)
- Artist: William Etty
- Year: 1828
- Medium: Oil on canvas
- Dimensions: 140 cm × 202.3 cm (55 in × 79.6 in)
- Location: Russell-Cotes Art Gallery & Museum

The World Before the Flood is an oil-on-canvas painting by the English artist William Etty, first exhibited in 1828 and currently in the Southampton City Art Gallery. It depicts a scene from John Milton's Paradise Lost in which, among a series of visions of the future shown to Adam, he sees the world immediately before the Great Flood. The painting illustrates the stages of courtship as described by Milton: a group of men select wives from a group of dancing women, drag their chosen woman from the group, and settle down to married life. Behind the courting group, an oncoming storm looms, foreshadowing the destruction which the dancers and lovers are about to bring upon themselves.

When first exhibited at the 1828 Royal Academy Summer Exhibition the painting attracted large crowds, and strongly divided critical opinion. It was greatly praised by many critics, who counted it among the finest works of art in the country. Other reviewers condemned it as crude, tasteless, offensive and poorly executed.

The painting was bought at the Summer Exhibition by the Marquess of Stafford. It was sold in 1908, long after Etty had fallen out of fashion, for a substantial loss, and sold again in 1937 for a further substantial loss to the Southampton City Art Gallery, where it remains. Another work by Etty, sold as A Bacchanalian Scene in 1830 and later renamed Landscape with Figures, was identified in 1953 as a preliminary oil sketch for The World Before the Flood and purchased by the York Art Gallery. The two paintings were exhibited together as part of a major retrospective of Etty's work in 2011–2012.

== Background ==
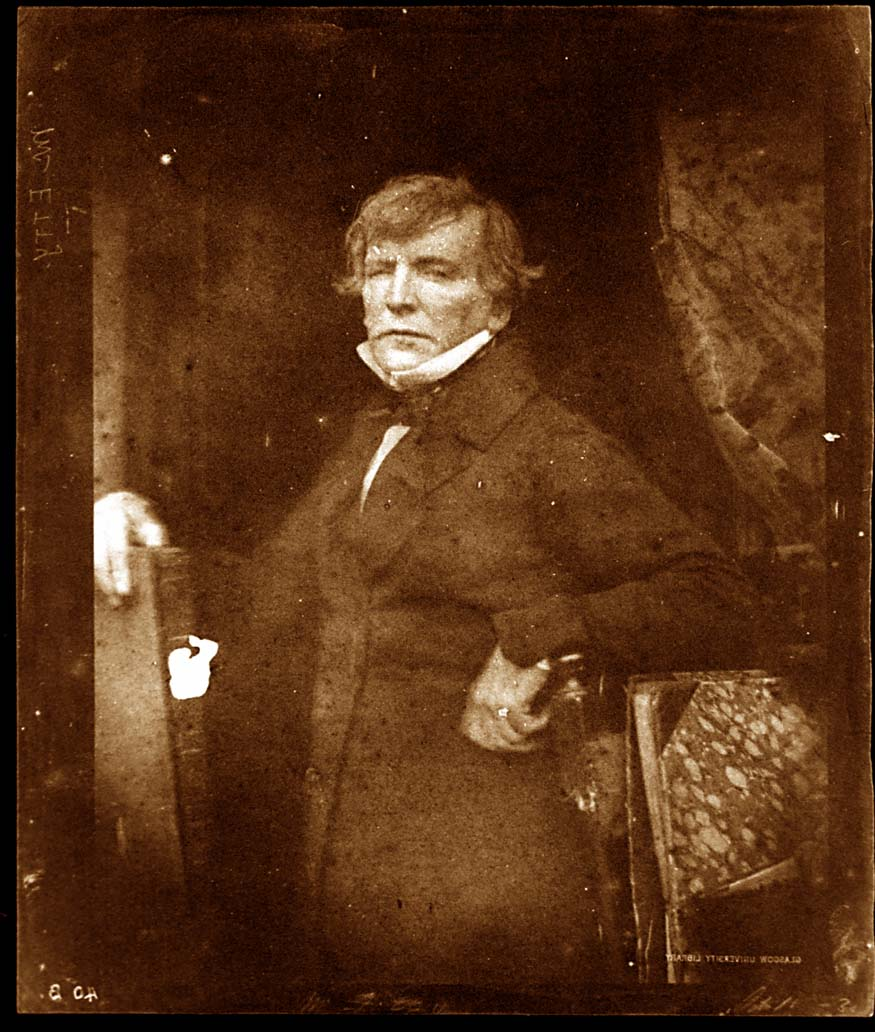
William Etty, 1844

William Etty was born in 1787, the son of a York baker and miller. On 8 October 1798, at the age of 11, he was apprenticed as a printer to Robert Peck of Hull, publisher of local newspaper the Hull Packet. On completing his seven-year apprenticeship he moved at the age of 18 to London, with the intention of becoming a history painter in the tradition of the Old Masters. Strongly influenced by the works of Titian and Rubens, he submitted paintings to the Royal Academy of Arts and the British Institution, all of which were either rejected or received scant attention when exhibited.

In 1821 the Royal Academy accepted and exhibited one of Etty's works, The Arrival of Cleopatra in Cilicia (also known as The Triumph of Cleopatra). The painting was extremely well received, and many of Etty's fellow artists greatly admired him. He was elected a full Royal Academician in 1828, at that time the most prestigious honour available to an artist. (Note: In Etty's time, honours such as knighthoods were only bestowed on presidents of major institutions, not on even the most well-respected artists.) He became well respected for his ability to capture flesh tones accurately, and for his fascination with contrasts in skin tones. In the decade following the exhibition of Cleopatra Etty tried to replicate its success by painting nude figures in biblical, literary and mythological settings.

Although some nudes by foreign artists were held in private English collections, the country had no tradition of depicting unclothed figures and the display and distribution of such material to the public had been suppressed since the 1787 Proclamation for the Discouragement of Vice. Etty was the first British artist to specialise in paintings of nudes, and the reaction of uneducated audiences to these paintings caused concern throughout the 19th century. (Note: In the words of Tate Britain curator Alison Smith, "Artists and connoisseurs were generally trusted to approach images of the undraped figure with contemplative composure but audiences uneducated in the intricacies of art criticism tended to be regarded with suspicion lest they conflate ideal form with naked fact.") Many critics condemned his repeated depictions of female nudity as indecent, although his portraits of males in a similar state of undress were generally well received. (Note: Etty's male nude portraits were primarily of mythological heroes and classical combat, genres in which the depiction of male nudity was considered acceptable in England.)

== Subject ==
They on the Plain
Long had not walkt, when from the Tents behold
A Beavie of fair Women, richly gay
In Gems and wanton dress; to the Harp they sung
Soft amorous Ditties, and in dance came on:
The Men though grave, ey'd them, and let thir eyes
Rove without rein, till in the amorous Net
Fast caught, they lik'd, and each his liking chose;
And now of love they treat till th'Eevning Star
Loves Harbinger appeerd; then all in heat
They light the Nuptial Torch, and bid invoke
Hymen, then first to marriage Rites invok't;
With Feast and Musick all the Tents resound.
Such happy interview and fair event
Of love and youth not lost, Songs, Garlands, Flours,
And charming Symphonies attach'd the heart
Of Adam, soon enclin'd to admit delight,
The bent of Nature; which he thus express'd.

— Paradise Lost, Book XI, lines 580–597

The World Before the Flood illustrates lines 580–597 from Book XI of John Milton's Paradise Lost. Among the visions of the future the Archangel Michael shows to Adam is the world after the expulsion from the Garden of Eden but before the Great Flood. This section of Paradise Lost reflects a passage from the sixth chapter of the Book of Genesis: "That the sons of God saw the daughters of men that they were fair; and they took them wives of all which they chose," an act which would shortly cause God to regret creating humanity and to cleanse the earth in the Great Flood. (Note: The relevant verse is Genesis 6:2.)

The painting shows the stages of courtship as described by Milton, as men are seduced by women and pass from enjoying the company of other men into married life. Etty worked through various configurations for the characters in the painting before settling on his final design.

== Composition ==
The World Before the Flood is strongly influenced by A Bacchanalian Revel Before a Term of Pan (1632–1633) by Nicolas Poussin, whom Etty greatly admired and of whose works he had previously made several copies; this painting had been bought by the National Gallery in 1826. Adam and Michael are not visible in the painting. Instead, the viewer sees the scene from Adam's point of view.

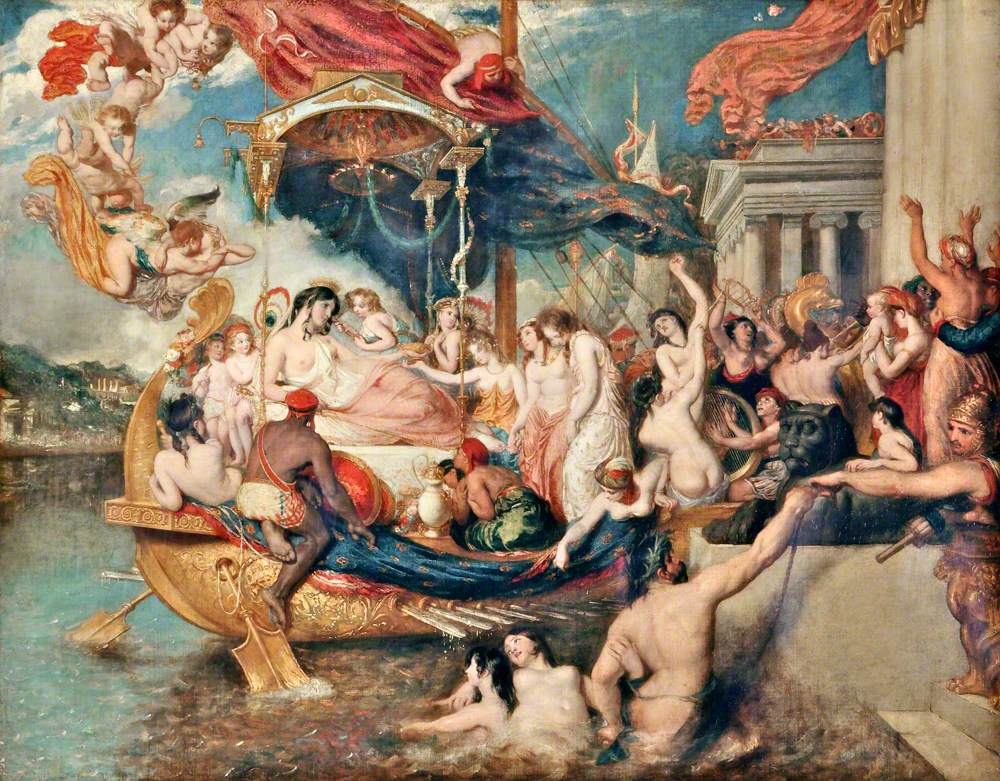
Etty reused the figure of the seated black soldier from his The Triumph of Cleopatra (1821).

Etty's painting is a Bacchanalian scene, centred on a group of six scantily-clad women dancing, while a group of men watch. The women's cheeks are flushed both with the exertion of their dancing and with their lustful attempts to seduce the watching men. The men "let their eyes rove without rein", each choosing the woman he wants to be with.

At the left, five men eye the six dancing women. Three of the men discuss their choice of women, while the other two watch the dancing group alone. The male figure closest to the viewer, a seated black man, had previously appeared as a soldier in The Triumph of Cleopatra. A sixth man has made his choice, and lunges forward to grab the arms of a bare-breasted dancing woman.

In the centre, the women dance. Their interlocked arms and hands create a pattern at the centre of the canvas, which acts as the focus of the painting. To the right of the central group of dancers a young man drags another woman away from the group of dancers, to join a pair of lovers who lie down together at the right of the painting.

Across the entire width of the background, a darkening sky and oncoming storm clouds presage the destruction that the dancers are unwittingly about to bring upon themselves.

In a preliminary study for The World Before the Flood now in the York Art Gallery, the broad structure is similar to that of the finished work, but the focus is more strongly on the central group of women. In Etty's oil sketch and preliminary drawings the right-most of the dancing figures, wearing a green skirt, faces outward with her arms behind her back, forming a closed circle together with the central group of dancers. In the finished work, she gestures outwards from the circle, creating a clear narrative flow in the positions of the figures: from the single men on the left, to the man choosing a wife, to the group of dancing women, to the couple leaving the circle of dancers to join the reclining lovers on the far right.

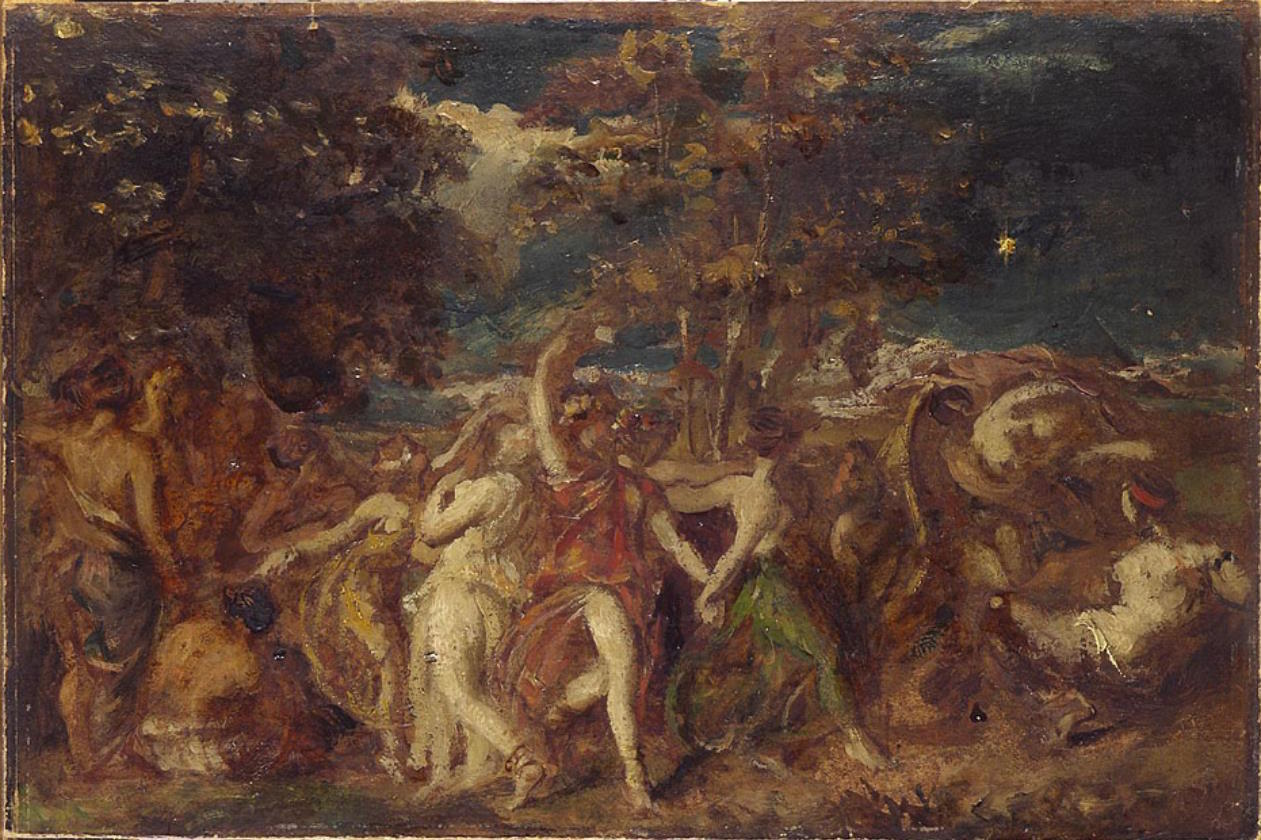
Preliminary oil sketch, c. 1828

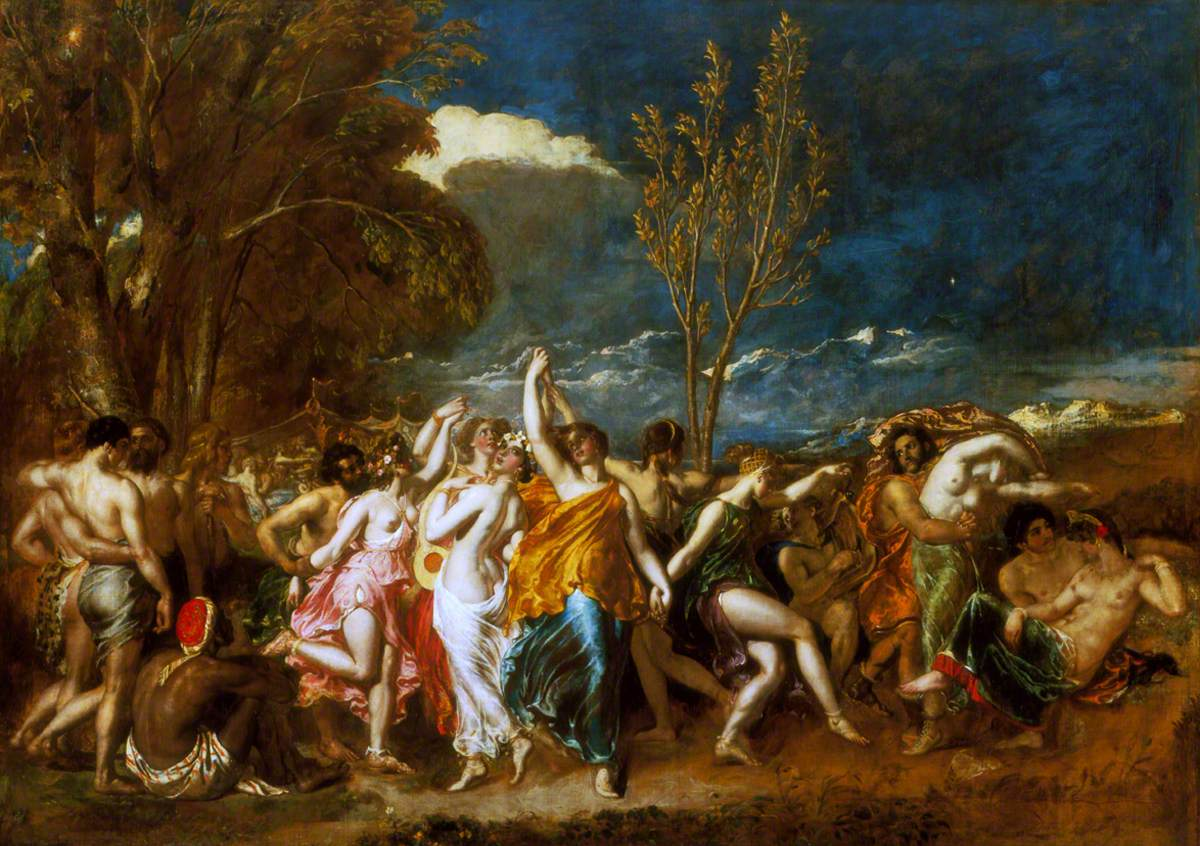
The World Before the Flood, 1828

The finished work shows subtle but important changes from preparatory sketches, changing from a focus on the central group of women in early versions to a narrative across the canvas in the finished work.

As was the case with most of his works, Etty did not give the painting a title. It was initially exhibited as A Composition, taken from the Eleventh Book of Milton's Paradise Lost, and was referred to by Etty himself as The Bevy of Fair Women and The Origin of Marriage. By 1862, when it was shown at the International Exhibition, it had acquired its present title.

== Reception ==
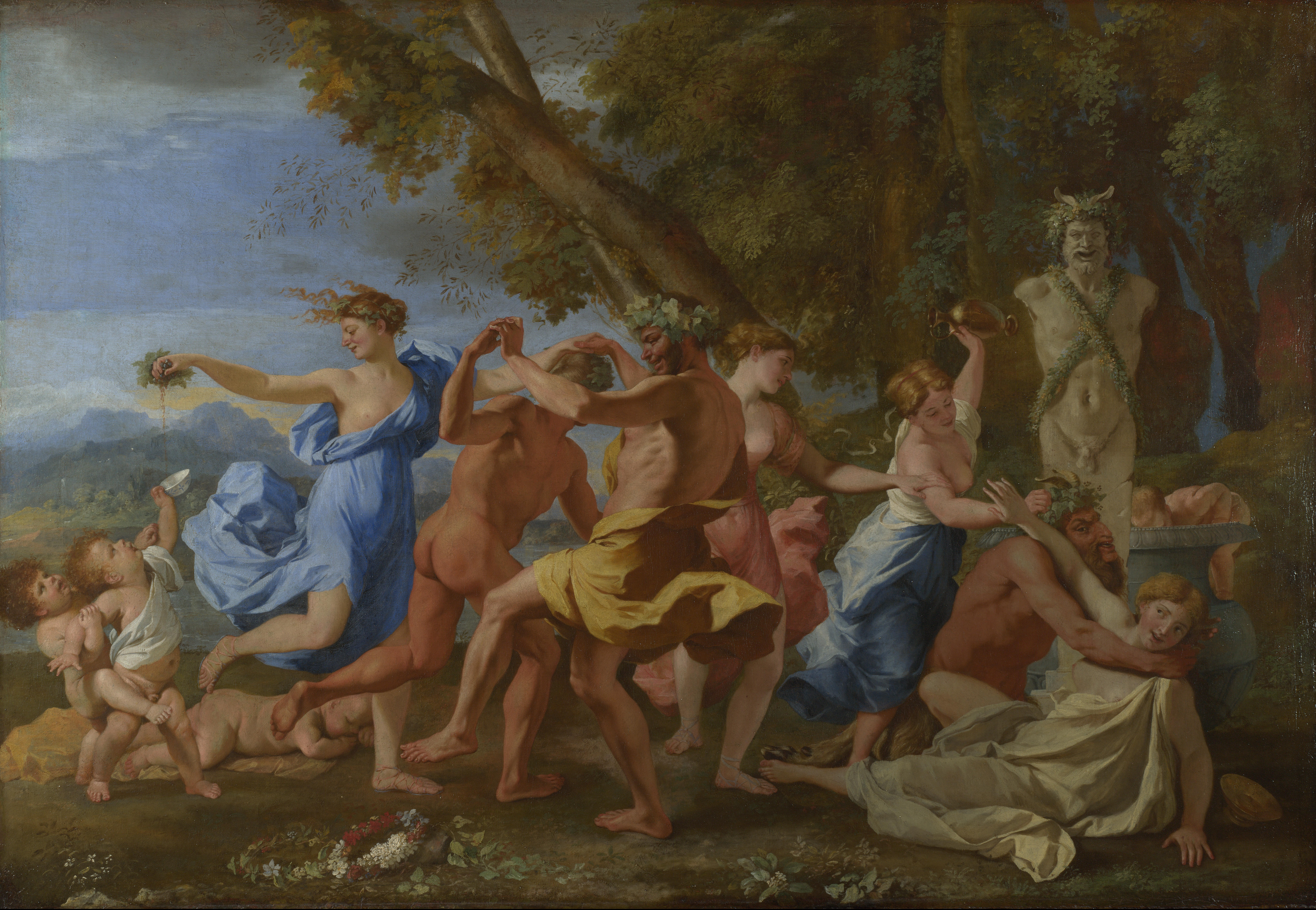
A Bacchanalian Revel Before a Term of Pan, Nicolas Poussin, 1632–1633. Etty was a great admirer of Poussin, and The World Before the Flood is heavily influenced by his work.

Critical opinion concerning The World Before the Flood was divided when the painting, along with two other of Etty's works, (Note: Etty's other paintings exhibited in the 1828 exhibition were Venus: The Evening Star and Guardian Cherubs: Portraits of the Children of the Earl of Normanton. This was Etty's first Summer Exhibition as a full Royal Academician. As well as the works exhibited at the Royal Academy, Etty exhibited Cupid Intercedes for Psyche and The Dawn of Love at the British Institution. Guardian Cherubs was the only painting exhibited by Etty at the Royal Academy in the whole of the 1820s that did not include at least one nude figure.) was exhibited at the 1828 Royal Academy Summer Exhibition. Some reviewers were intensely critical of the piece. A writer in the Literary Gazette called the painting a "deadly sin against good taste", describing the background as "unnecessarily harsh and crude" with "much to blame and lament" and the dancing figures "outrageous", complaining that the women reminded him not of Paradise Lost, but of the scantily clad witches in Robert Burns's Tam o' Shanter.

An anonymous critic in the Monthly Magazine disparaged the "writhings and twinings" of the painting's subjects, describing them as "as close to the unpardonable limits as anything that has lately appealed to the public eye". This same writer disapproved of the dark skin tones of some of the figures, arguing that "the brown visage of the gipsey gives but a dingy image of the roses and lilies that, from time immemorial, have made the charm of British beauty." The correspondent for The London Magazine felt that although the painting was "in many respects worthy of admiration ... [there] is a spirit, a boldness, and a startling effect," the work was poorly executed overall. Its depiction of women drew particular ire: "the expression of the faces is vapid; the features rather homely; the limbs, though not ill-drawn, have not that finish and play of the muscles, which alone give lightness and elasticity. They seem lifted up with difficulty, and ready to fall." The review upbraided Etty as an artist who had "advanced half way on his road to classic excellence; and there, when he should have proceeded with increased ardour and more careful exactness from being in view of his object, he has stopped short." Etty's fellow artist John Constable privately described the work as "a revel rout of Satyrs and lady bums as usual".

Were Milton now alive, possessed of sight,
And his embodied beauties here to view,
This scene he would behold with proud delight,
And own that Etty is a poet too.

But if Poussin could from the grave arise,
His heart at once would feel an envious thorn,
He would behold the work with jealous eyes,
And writhing, wish that Etty ne'er was born.

Artist! 'tis thine to reach the heroic sphere,
Or sport where Graces and the Loves preside;
Lofty or beautiful thy forms appear,
By Genius warm'd, with nature still thy guide.

— On a Picture in illustration of some passages in Paradise Lost, painted by William Etty, Esq., R.A. Elect, John Taylor, September 1828

Other critics offered a more positive impression of the piece. The Examiner celebrated Etty's having "outdone his former self, and most of his contemporaries". A reviewer in The Mirror of Literature, Amusement, and Instruction said: "Few pictures have attracted or deserved more attention than this masterly production," describing the figures as "graceful and elegant". The Athenaeum thought it "decidedly the most attractive picture in the whole Exhibition", noting that their review was delayed because in the opening week of the exhibition, "the crowds which continually stood in front of it rendered it quite impossible to get such a view of it as would enable us to do it justice." Colburn's New Monthly Magazine considered it "another instance of the rapid advances which this rising artist is making towards perfection". The most effusive praise was offered in poetic form by John Taylor, who in September 1828 imagined that if Milton and Nicolas Poussin were both alive to see the painting, Milton would view it with "proud delight", while Poussin would suffer an "envious thorn" with the realization that Etty's abilities had surpassed his own.

== Later history ==
The World Before the Flood was bought at its 1828 exhibition by The Marquess of Stafford for 500 guineas (about £47,000 in 2025 terms), to add to his collection of nudes by Titian. (Note: By 1844 at the latest, the painting was on display at Bridgewater House, Westminster, under the title A Festival before the Flood.) Etty was delighted with his success at the exhibition, at which all three of the paintings he had exhibited were successfully sold to prestigious buyers.

I know you will rejoice with us all, when I tell you that the principal part of the cargo of the ship "William Etty" (of whose arrival you had been advised), now landed at the Royal Academy Wharf, has been consigned to the Right Honourable the Marquis of Stafford, for five hundred guineas: the rest of the cargo being already owned by Lord Normanton and Digby Murray, Esq. ... After clearing out, we shall again put to sea and hope for equally favouring gales next voyage.

— Letter from William Etty to his cousin Thomas Bodley on the sale of The World Before the Flood.

From 1832 onwards, needled by repeated attacks from the press on his supposed indecency and tastelessness, Etty often made a conscious effort to project a moral dimension into his work, although he continued to be a prominent painter of nudes. He died in 1849, working and exhibiting up until his death despite consistently being regarded by many as a pornographer. Charles Robert Leslie observed shortly after Etty's death: "... [Etty] himself, thinking and meaning no evil, was not aware of the manner in which his works were regarded by grosser minds." Interest in his work declined as new movements came to characterise painting in Britain, and by the end of the 19th century the cost of all his paintings had fallen below their original prices.

The World Before the Flood was sold to F. E. Sidney in 1908 for 230 guineas (about £24,000 in 2025 terms), and sold on to the Southampton City Art Gallery in 1937 for 195 guineas (about £11,000 in 2025 terms), where as of 2016 it remains. After its initial exhibition in 1828, the painting was shown at a number of significant exhibitions throughout the 19th century. Etty's preliminary oil sketch entered the collection of Etty's former mentor Sir Thomas Lawrence. Following Lawrence's death in 1830, it was sold as A Bacchanalian Scene for 27 guineas (about £2,700 in 2025 terms), and sold on as Landscape with Figures in 1908. In 1953 it was identified as a study for The World Before the Flood, and purchased by the York Art Gallery, where as of 2016 it remains. Both versions of the painting were shown together as part of a major retrospective of Etty's work at the York Art Gallery in 2011–2012.
