= The Triumph of Cleopatra =

1821 painting by William Etty

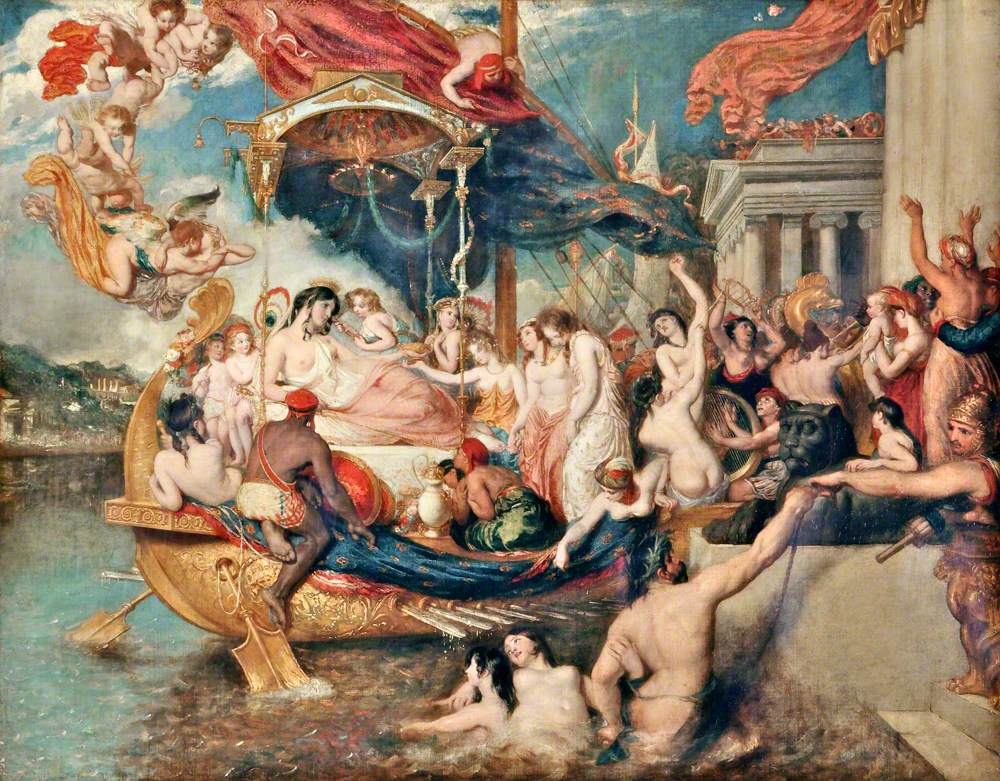
The Triumph of Cleopatra, 1821, 106.5 by 132.5 cm (41.9 by 52.2 in)

The Triumph of Cleopatra, also known as Cleopatra's Arrival in Cilicia and The Arrival of Cleopatra in Cilicia, is an oil painting by English artist William Etty. It was first exhibited in 1821, and is displayed in the Lady Lever Art Gallery in Port Sunlight, Merseyside. During the 1810s Etty had become widely respected among staff and students at the Royal Academy of Arts, in particular for his use of colour and ability to paint realistic flesh tones. Despite having exhibited at every Summer Exhibition since 1811, he attracted little commercial or critical interest. In 1820, he exhibited The Coral Finder, which showed nude figures on a gilded boat. This painting attracted the attention of Sir Francis Freeling, who commissioned a similar painting on a more ambitious scale.

The Triumph of Cleopatra illustrates a scene from Plutarch's Life of Antony and Shakespeare's Antony and Cleopatra, in which Cleopatra, Queen of Egypt, travels to Tarsus in Cilicia aboard a magnificently decorated ship to cement an alliance with the Roman general Mark Antony. An intentionally cramped and crowded composition, it shows a huge group of people in various states of undress, gathering on the bank to watch the ship's arrival; another large number is on board. Although not universally admired in the press, the painting was an immediate success, making Etty famous almost overnight. Buoyed by its reception, Etty devoted much of the next decade to creating further history paintings containing nude figures, becoming renowned for his combination of nudity and moral messages.

== Background ==
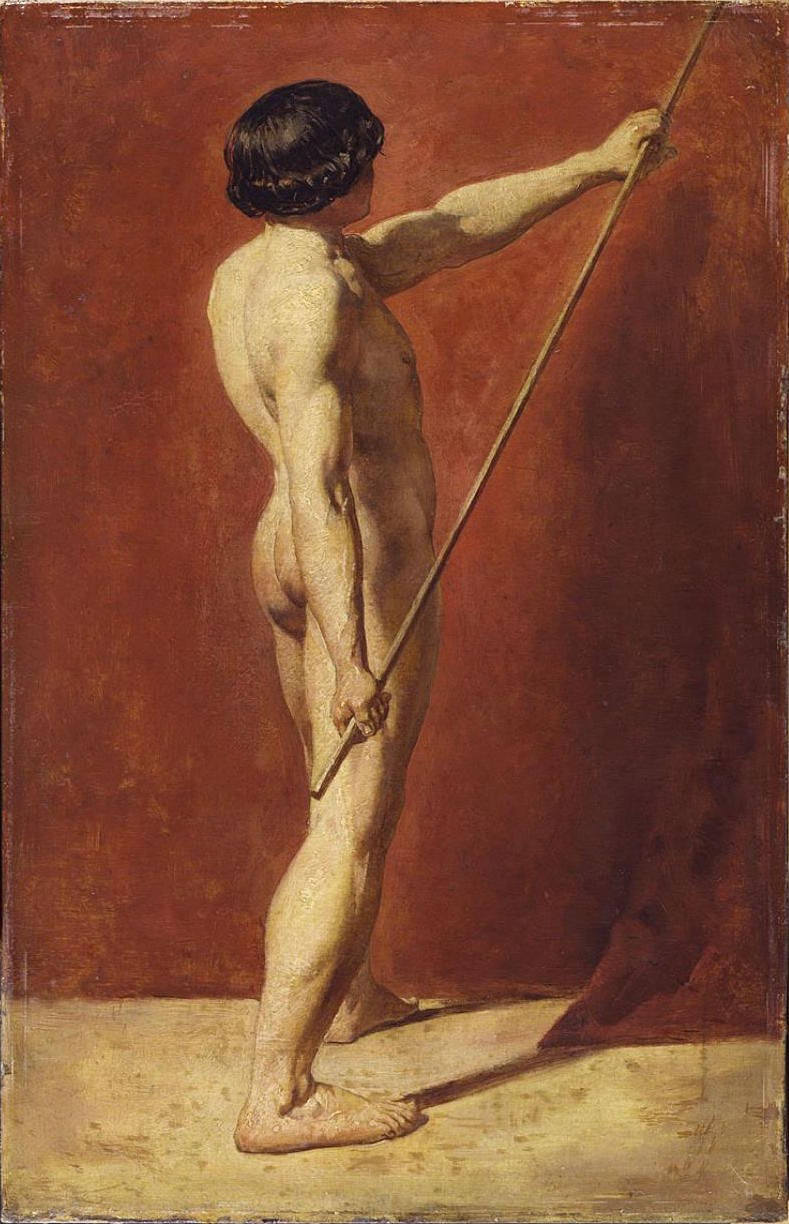
Male Nude with Staff (1814–16). Despite limited success in the 1810s, Etty was admired for his ability to paint flesh tones.

William Etty was born in York in 1787, the son of a miller and baker. He showed artistic promise from an early age, but his family were financially insecure, and at the age of 12 he left school to become an apprentice printer in Hull. On completing his seven-year indenture he moved to London "with a few pieces of chalk-crayons in colours", with the aim of emulating the Old Masters and becoming a history painter. Etty gained acceptance to the Royal Academy Schools in early 1807. After a year spent studying under the renowned portrait painter Thomas Lawrence, Etty returned to the Royal Academy, drawing in the life class and copying other paintings. He was unsuccessful in all the Academy's competitions, and every painting he submitted for the Summer Exhibition was rejected.

In 1811, one of his paintings, Telemachus Rescues Antiope from the Fury of the Wild Boar, was finally accepted for the Summer Exhibition. (Note: As with every painting exhibited by Etty at the Summer Exhibition before 1819, Telemachus Rescues Antiope from the Fury of the Wild Boar has not survived.) Etty was becoming widely respected at the Royal Academy for his painting, particularly his use of colour and his ability to produce realistic flesh tones, and from 1811 onwards had at least one work accepted for the Summer Exhibition each year. However, he had little commercial success and generated little interest over the next few years.

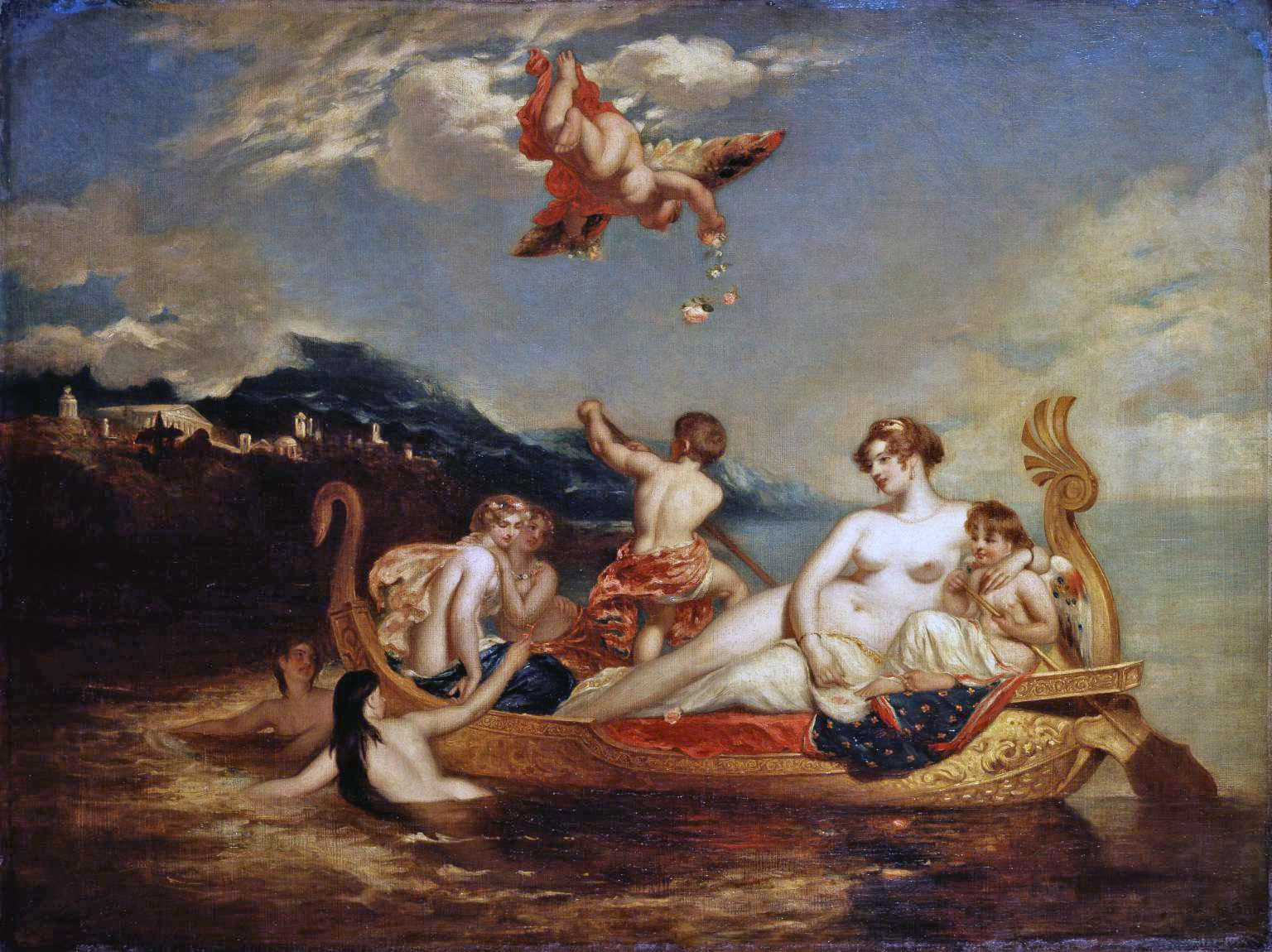
The Coral Finder (1820) led Sir Francis Freeling to commission Cleopatra.

At the 1820 Summer Exhibition Etty exhibited The Coral Finder: Venus and her Youthful Satellites Arriving at the Isle of Paphos. Strongly inspired by Titian, The Coral Finder depicts Venus Victrix lying nude in a golden boat, surrounded by scantily-clad attendants. It was sold at exhibition to piano manufacturer Thomas Tomkinson for £30 (about £2,500 in 2025 terms).

Sir Francis Freeling admired The Coral Finder at its exhibition, and learning that it had been sold he commissioned Etty to paint a similar picture on a more ambitious scale, for a fee of 200 guineas (about £17,500 in 2025 terms). (Note: The transaction is not recorded, and there is some suggestion that Freeling did not pay the full amount agreed.) Etty had for some time been musing on the possibility of a painting of Cleopatra and took the opportunity provided by Freeling to paint a picture of her based loosely on the composition of The Coral Finder.

== Composition ==
The Triumph of Cleopatra is based loosely on Plutarch's Life of Antony as repeated in Shakespeare's Antony and Cleopatra, in which Cleopatra, Queen of Egypt, travels to Tarsus in Cilicia aboard a grand ship to cement an alliance with the Roman general Mark Antony.

Therefore when she was sent unto by divers letters, both from Antonius himself and also from his friends, she made so light of it and mocked Antonius so much that she disdained to set forward otherwise but to take her barge in the river of Cydnus, the poop whereof was of gold, the sails of purple, and the oars of silver, which kept stroke in rowing after the sound of the music of flutes, howboys, cithernes, viols, and such other instruments as they played upon in the barge. And now for the person of herself: she was laid under a pavilion of cloth of gold of tissue, apparelled and attired like the goddess Venus commonly drawn in picture; and hard by her, on either hand of her, pretty fair boys apparelled as painters do set forth god Cupid, with little fans in their hands, with the which they fanned wind upon her. Her ladies and gentlewomen also, the fairest of them were apparelled like the nymphs Nereides (which are the mermaids of the waters) and like the Graces, some steering the helm, others tending the tackle and ropes of the barge, out of which there came a wonderful passing sweet savour of perfumes, that perfumed the wharf's side, pestered with innumerable multitudes of people.

— Plutarch, Life of Anthony, translated by Sir Thomas North

While superficially similar to The Coral Finder, Cleopatra is more closely related to the style of Jean-Baptiste Regnault, with its deliberately cramped and crowded composition. The individual figures are intentionally out of proportion to each other and to the ship, while numerous figures are tightly positioned within a relatively small section of the painting.

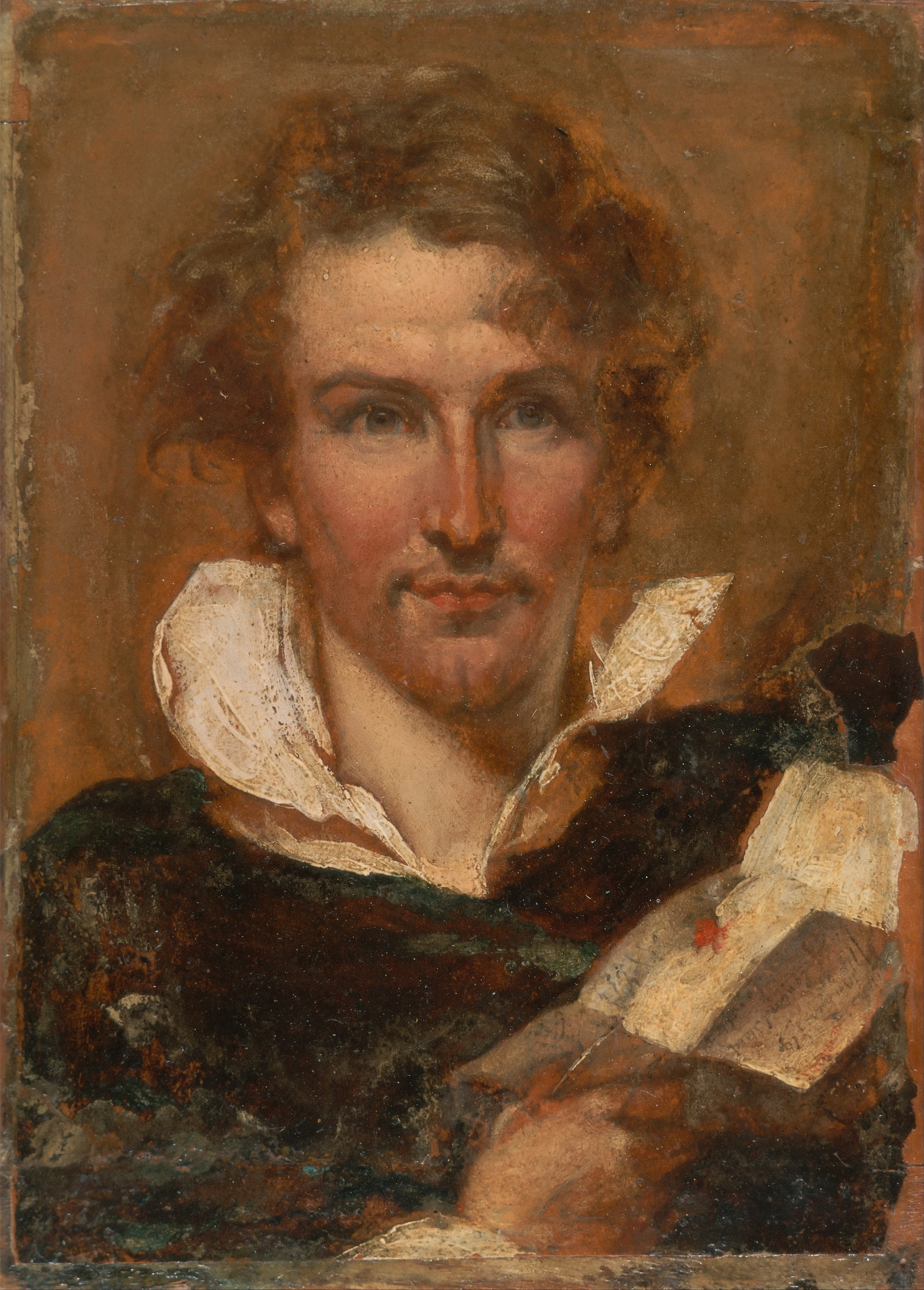
William Etty, self-portrait, 1823

As well as from Regnault, the work borrows elements from Titian, Rubens and classical sculpture. The figures are painted as groups, and while each figure and group of figures is carefully arranged and painted, the combination of groups gives the appearance of a confused mass surrounding the ship when the painting is viewed as a whole. (Etty's 1958 biographer Dennis Farr comments that "[Cleopatra] contains elements enough for three or four paintings no less ambitious but more maturely planned.") The scene includes a number of images based on drawings Etty had sketched while out and about in London, such as the mother holding up her baby to see the view and the crowd on the roof of a temple in the background. It also includes elements of European painting that Etty had learned while copying Old Master artworks as a student, such as the putti in the sky. Etty greatly admired the Venetian school, and the painting includes obvious borrowings from Titian and other Venetian artists. It also contains a number of elements from the paintings of Rubens, such as the Nereids and Triton in the sea in front of the ship.

Unusually for an English painting of the period in its representation of a queen of an African country the group of Cleopatra's attendants includes both dark- and light-skinned figures shown on equal terms and with equal prominence. From the earliest days of his career Etty had been interested in depicting variations in skin colour, and The Missionary Boy, believed to be his oldest significant surviving painting, shows a dark-skinned child. (Note: The attribution of The Missionary Boy to Etty is unconfirmed, and it was possibly painted c. 1820 by Etty's then assistant George Franklin. A damaged inscription on the back reads "I well remember [...] missionary boy at Hull painted York by W. Etty R.A.". No record of a dark-skinned child preacher appears in contemporary newspaper reports, and the picture possibly depicts a child convert educated by missionaries. The painting is signed "W. Etty" in the lower left corner, but the signature may not be authentic; no other Etty painting is signed on the front.)

== Reception ==
Cleopatra caused an immediate sensation; Etty later claimed that the day after the Summer Exhibition opened he "awoke famous". The May 1821 issue of The Gentleman's Magazine hailed Cleopatra as "belonging to the highest class", and Charles Robert Leslie described it as "a splendid triumph of colour". The painting did not meet with universal approval. Blackwood's Edinburgh Magazine conceded that the painting had been "seen and admired at the Royal Academy" but condemned Etty's taking a mythological approach to a historical subject:

The effect of this picture would have been much more intense had the painter treated it as a mere fact, and had not brought upon the scene those flying Cupids who turn the thing into a mythological fable. Real boys dressed like Cupids would have been proper, but aerial beings are impertinences, and put one out when one is thinking of the sex. If this amorous pageant had been a mere fiction, instead of having actually taken place, still the power of its delineation would have consisted in its probability.

— Blackwood's Edinburgh Magazine, March 1822

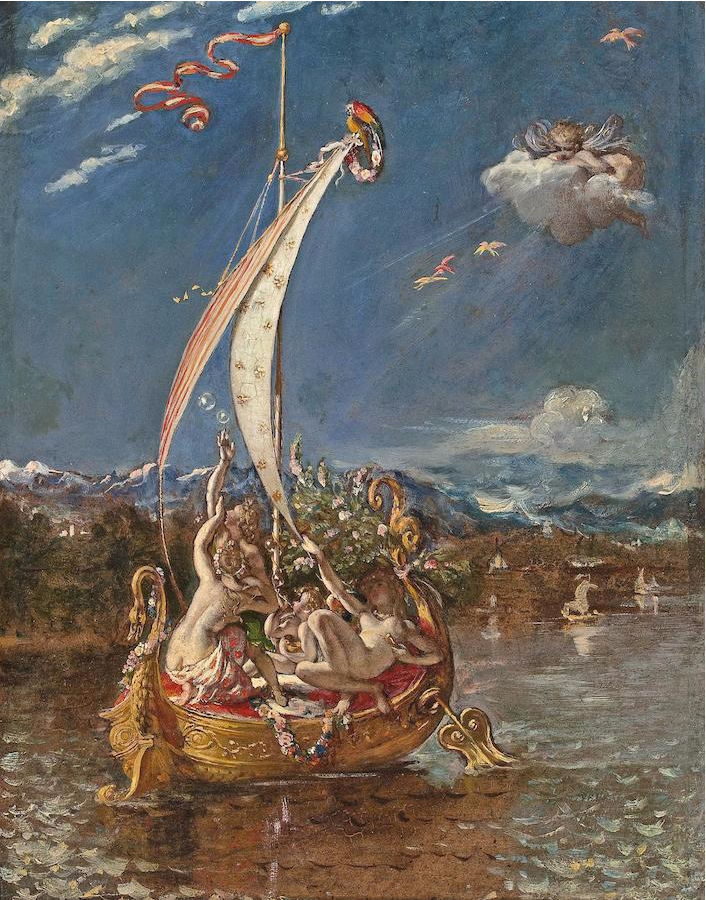
A Sketch from One of Gray's Odes (Youth on the Prow) (1822)

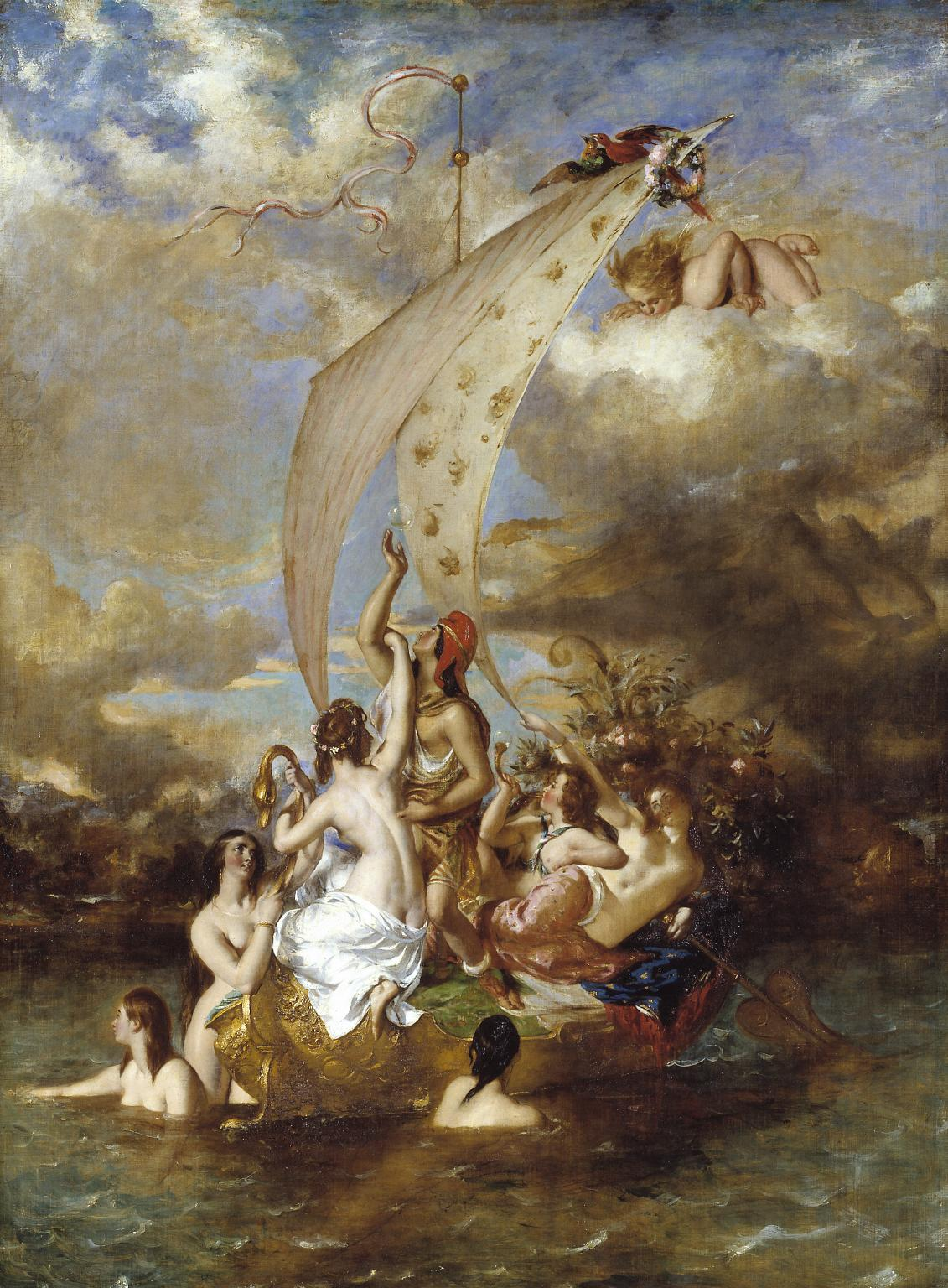
Youth on the Prow, and Pleasure at the Helm (1832)

Etty's Youth on the Prow pictures were condemned by some newspapers for their supposed indecency. The 1832 version became one of his best known works.

Etty attempted to replicate the success of Cleopatra, and his next significant exhibited work was A Sketch from One of Gray's Odes (Youth on the Prow), exhibited at the British Institution in January 1822. As with The Coral Finder and Cleopatra, this painting showed a gilded boat filled with nude figures, and its exhibition provoked condemnation from The Times:

We take this opportunity of advising Mr. Etty, who got some reputation for painting "Cleopatra's Galley", not to be seduced into a style which can gratify only the most vicious taste. Naked figures, when painted with the purity of Raphael, may be endured: but nakedness without purity is offensive and indecent, and on Mr. Etty's canvass is mere dirty flesh. Mr. Howard, (Note: Henry Howard, one of Etty's rivals in the field of history painting.) whose poetical subjects sometimes require naked figures, never disgusts the eye or mind. Let Mr. Etty strive to acquire a taste equally pure: he should know, that just delicate taste and pure moral sense are synonymous terms.

— The Times, 29 January 1822

Despite the tone, Etty was pleased to be noticed by a newspaper as influential as The Times, and much later confessed how delighted he was that the "Times noticed me. I felt my chariot wheels were on the right road to fame and honour, and I now drove on like another Jehu!" Possibly as a result of the criticism in The Times, Freeling asked Etty to overpaint the figures in the foreground of Cleopatra. In 1829, after Etty had become a respected artist, Freeling allowed the restoration of the figures to their original condition.

== Legacy ==
The criticism did little to dissuade Etty from attempting to reproduce the success of Cleopatra, and he concentrated on painting further history paintings containing nude figures. He exhibited 15 paintings at the Summer Exhibition in the 1820s (including Cleopatra), and all but one contained at least one nude figure. (Note: The sole exception was Guardian Cherubs, a commissioned portrait of the children of Welbore Ellis Agar, 2nd Earl of Normanton.) In so doing Etty became the first English artist to treat nude studies as a serious art form in their own right, capable of being aesthetically attractive and of delivering moral messages.

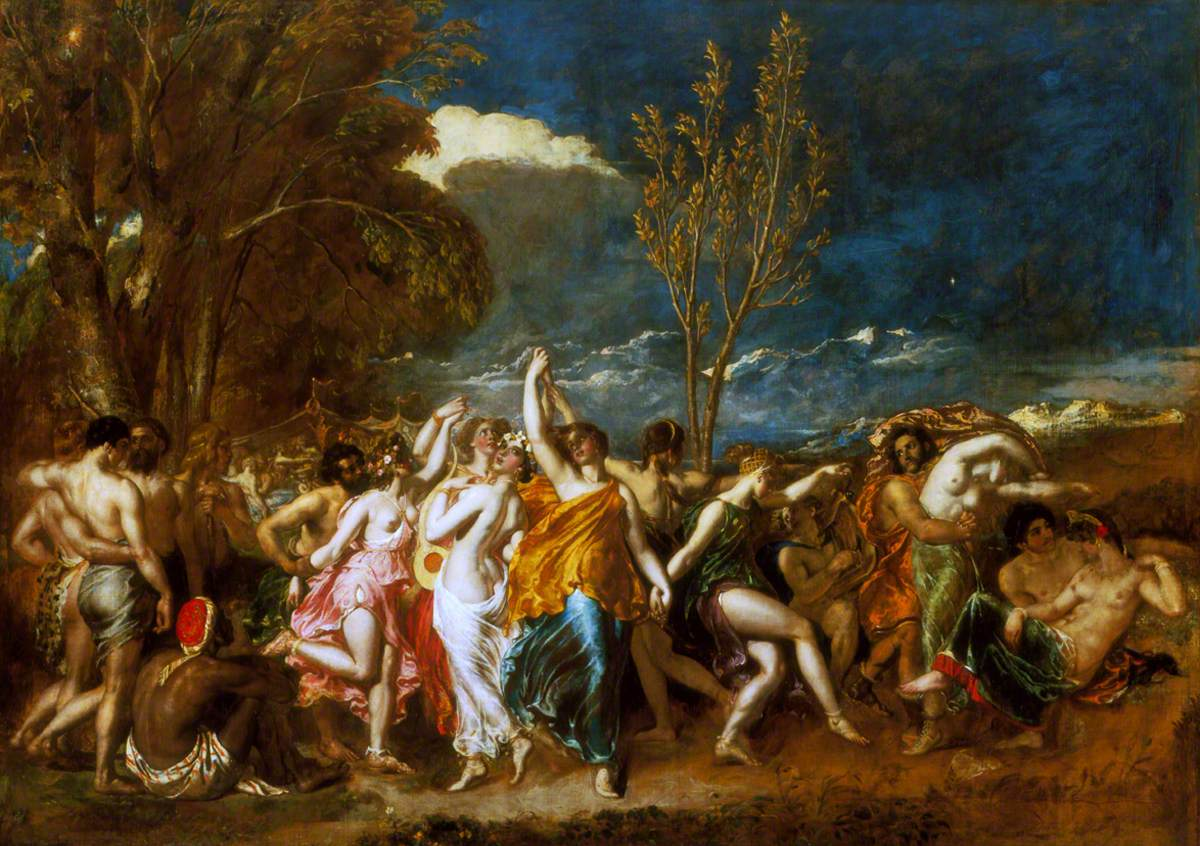
The World Before the Flood (1828) reuses some elements from The Triumph of Cleopatra.

In 1823–24 Etty made an extended trip to study in France and Italy, and returned a highly accomplished artist. His monumental 304 by 399 cm (10 ft by 13 ft 1 in) 1825 painting The Combat: Woman Pleading for the Vanquished was extremely well-received, and Etty began to be spoken of as one of England's finest painters. In February 1828 Etty soundly defeated John Constable by eighteen votes to five to become a full Royal Academician, at the time the highest honour available to an artist. (Note: In Etty's time, honours such as knighthoods for artists were only bestowed on presidents of major institutions, not on even the most well respected artists.) On occasion he would re-use elements from Cleopatra in his later paintings, such as the black soldier who squats on the side of the ship in Cleopatra and who also sits watching dancers in his 1828 The World Before the Flood.

Etty continued to produce paintings ranging from still lifes to formal portraits, and to attract both admiration for his technique and criticism for supposed obscenity, until his death in 1849. In the years following his death Etty's work became highly collectable, and his works fetched huge sums on resale. Changing tastes from the 1870s onwards meant history paintings in Etty's style fell rapidly out of fashion, and by the end of the 19th century, the value of all of his works had fallen below their original prices.

Despite its technical flaws, Cleopatra remained a favourite among many of Etty's admirers during his lifetime; in 1846 Elizabeth Rigby described it as a "glorious confusion of figures" and "that wonderful 'Cleopatra' of Etty's".

Following Freeling's death in 1836, Cleopatra was sold for 210 guineas, around the same price Freeling had paid for it, and entered the collection of Lord Taunton. While in Taunton's ownership it was shown at a number of important exhibitions, including a major 1849 Etty retrospective, the Art Treasures Exhibition of 1857 and the 1862 International Exhibition. Following Taunton's death in 1869 it was sold to a succession of owners for a variety of prices, peaking at 500 guineas (about £55,000 in 2025 terms) in 1880 and dropping in price on each subsequent resale. In 1911 it was bought for 240 guineas (about £26,000 in 2025 terms) by William Lever, 1st Viscount Leverhulme, who was a great admirer of Etty and had a number of his paintings hanging in the entrance hall of his home. It has remained in the collection Leverhulme assembled, housed from 1922 in the Lady Lever Art Gallery, ever since.
