= Russell-Cotes Art Gallery & Museum =

Art gallery and museum in Bournemouth, England

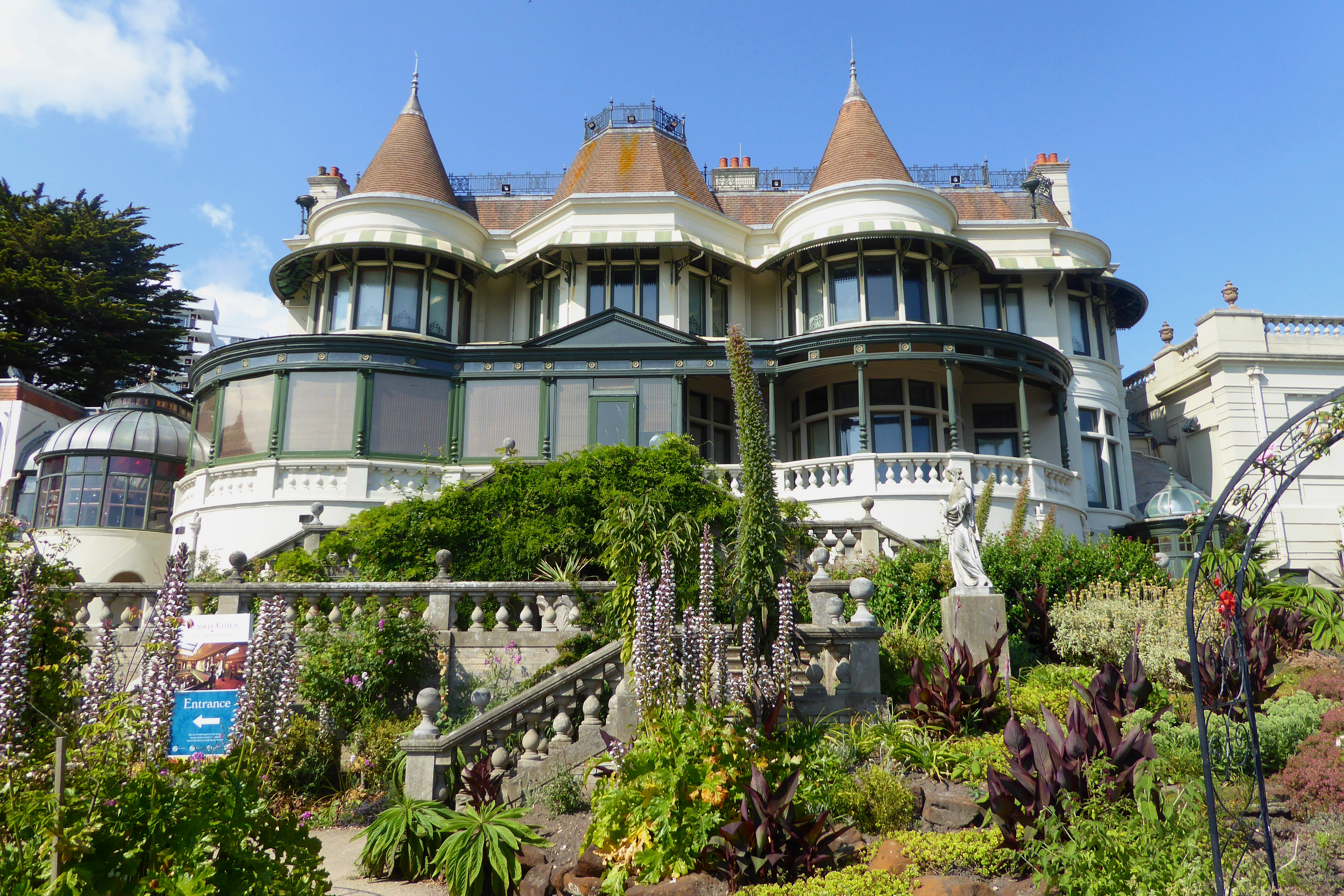

- Location within Dorset
- Established: 1908
- Location: Russell Cotes Road, East Cliff, Bournemouth
- Coordinates: 50°43′03″N 1°52′15″W
- Website: russellcotes.com

Listed Building – Grade II*
- Official name: Russell-Cotes Museum
- Designated: 1 August 1974
- Reference no.: 1108857

The Russell-Cotes Museum (formally, the Russell-Cotes Art Gallery & Museum) is an art gallery and museum in Bournemouth, England. A Grade II* listed building originally known as East Cliff Hall, it is located on the top of the East Cliff, next to the Royal Bath Hotel.

== History and collections ==
In 1897, the architect John Frederick Fogerty was commissioned by Merton Russell-Cotes, then the owner of the Royal Bath Hotel, to build a house as a birthday present for his wife Annie. Originally called East Cliff Hall, it was built in the northeast section of his hotel's garden, in the Art Nouveau style, with interiors by John Thomas and his son Oliver. It was completed in its first form in 1901.

In 1907, Annie Russell-Cotes donated East Cliff Hall and its contents as a museum to the town of Bournemouth, and Merton donated his fine art collection. In return they were made honorary freemen of the town. They continued living in part of the house and over the next ten years they paid for an extension to be built and made further donations, including the freehold of the site. It was formally opened by Princess Beatrice in 1919. After their deaths, the Borough of Bournemouth took over the running of East Cliff Hall and re-opened it as the Russell-Cotes Art Gallery and Museum on 10 March 1922. After Sir Merton's death, it was extended into his part of the house; a further extension was opened in 2000.

The house and the new annexe display various items collected in the course of Sir Merton's foreign travels, especially to Japan, and paintings from his personal art collection. One room is the Sir Henry Irving Museum; Irving, a friend of the Russell-Cotes', had stayed in that room. When Irving died in 1905, this room was devoted to his memory. Items purchased at the sale of Irving's effects formed the basis of the Irving Museum and were displayed with memorabilia associated with his contemporaries such as Ellen Terry and Sarah Bernhardt.

In October 2023, it was reported that the Russell-Cotes requires £4m of repairs to restore the museum to an acceptable standard due to water damage. The museum is in the process of becoming an independent charity.

== Exhibitions ==
Twice-yearly exhibitions of contemporary art support works from the main collection, and have included painter Jonathan Yeo and sculptor Jon Edgar in 2011.

== Children's facilities ==
The new annexe also has a restaurant and a play area for young children. The art gallery in the old annexe displays a wide and frequently changing collection of pictures and statues. Older children are invited to complete a "detective sheet", for example finding where there are pictures of a bat, a kingfisher and other animals and birds.

== Gallery ==
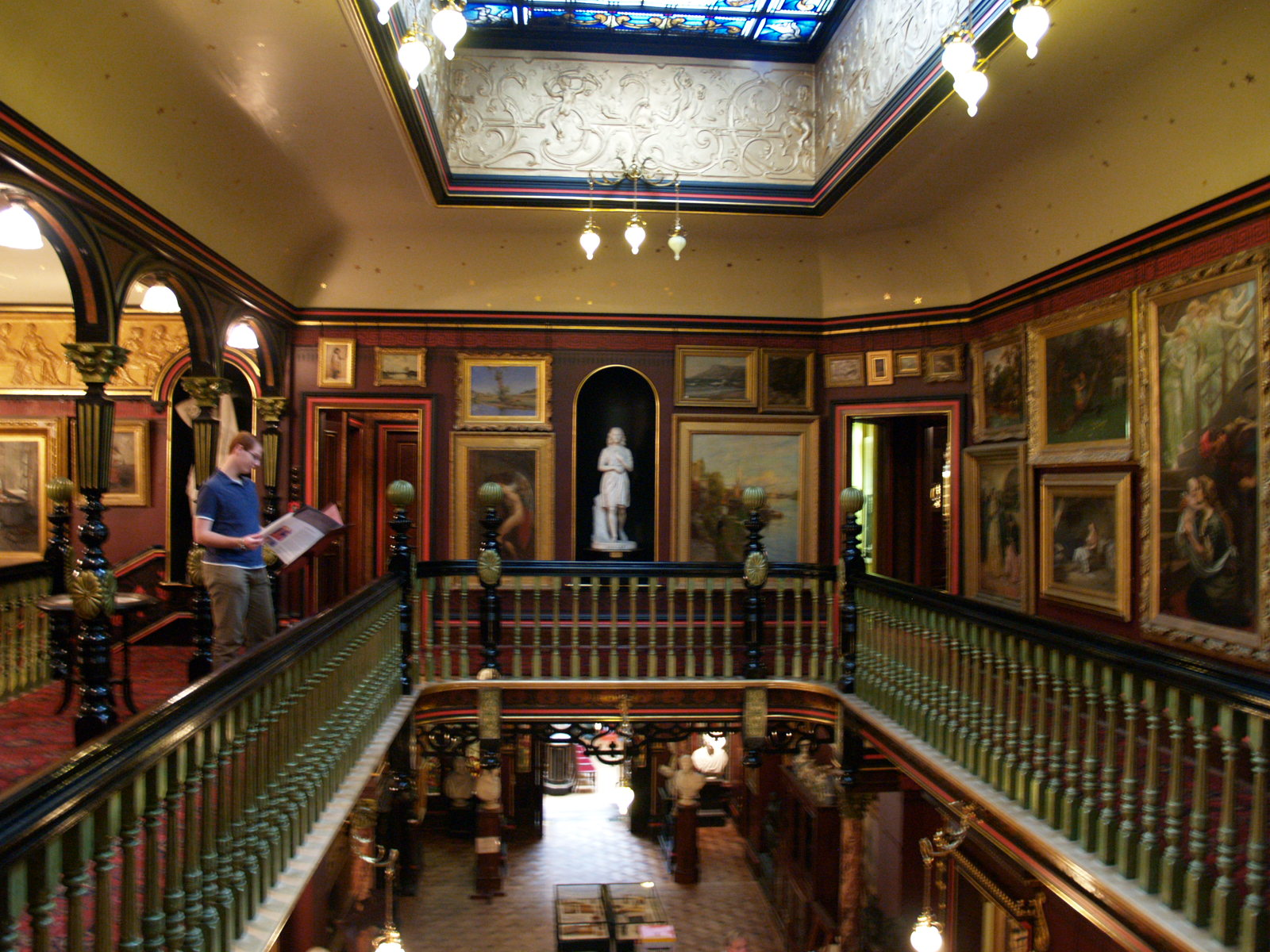
Interior of the hall in the museum

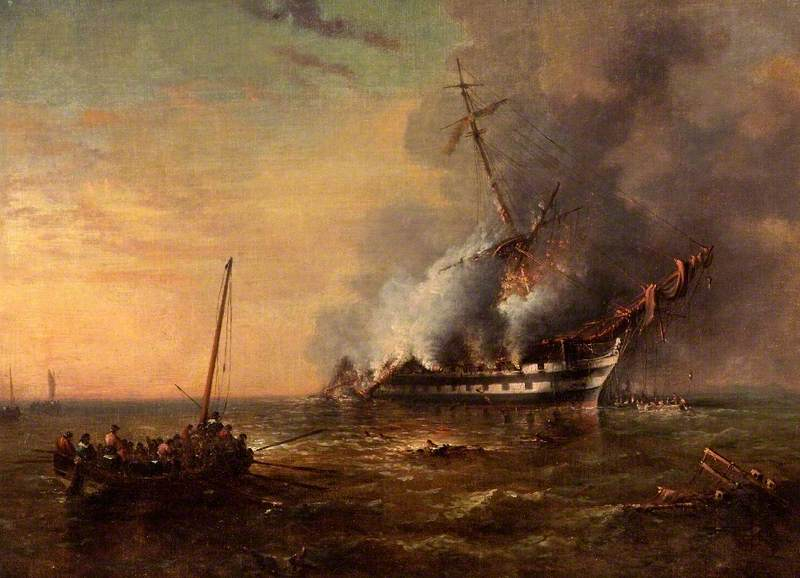
HMS Bombay; on Fire at Montevideo, Uruguay, 14 December 1864 by George Cochrane Kerr

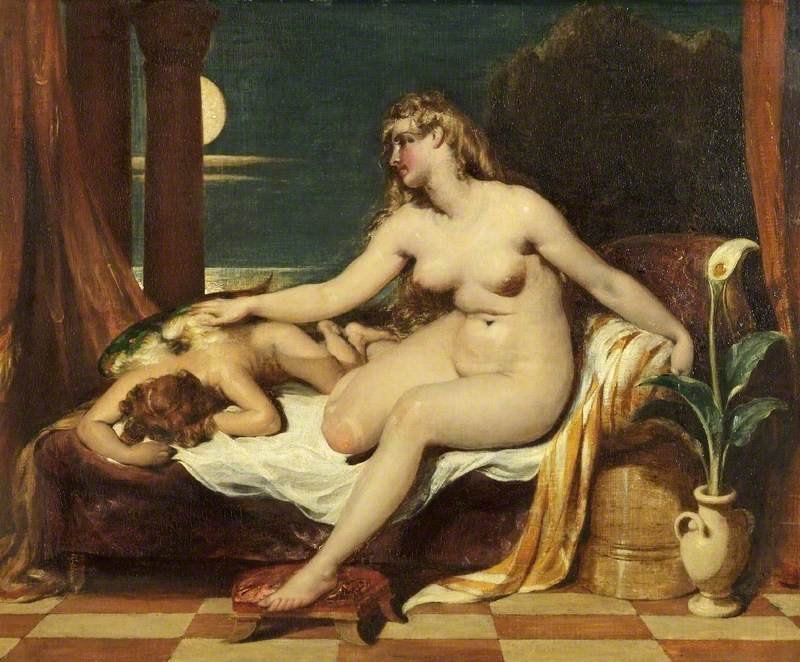
The Dawn of Love, 1828, by William Etty

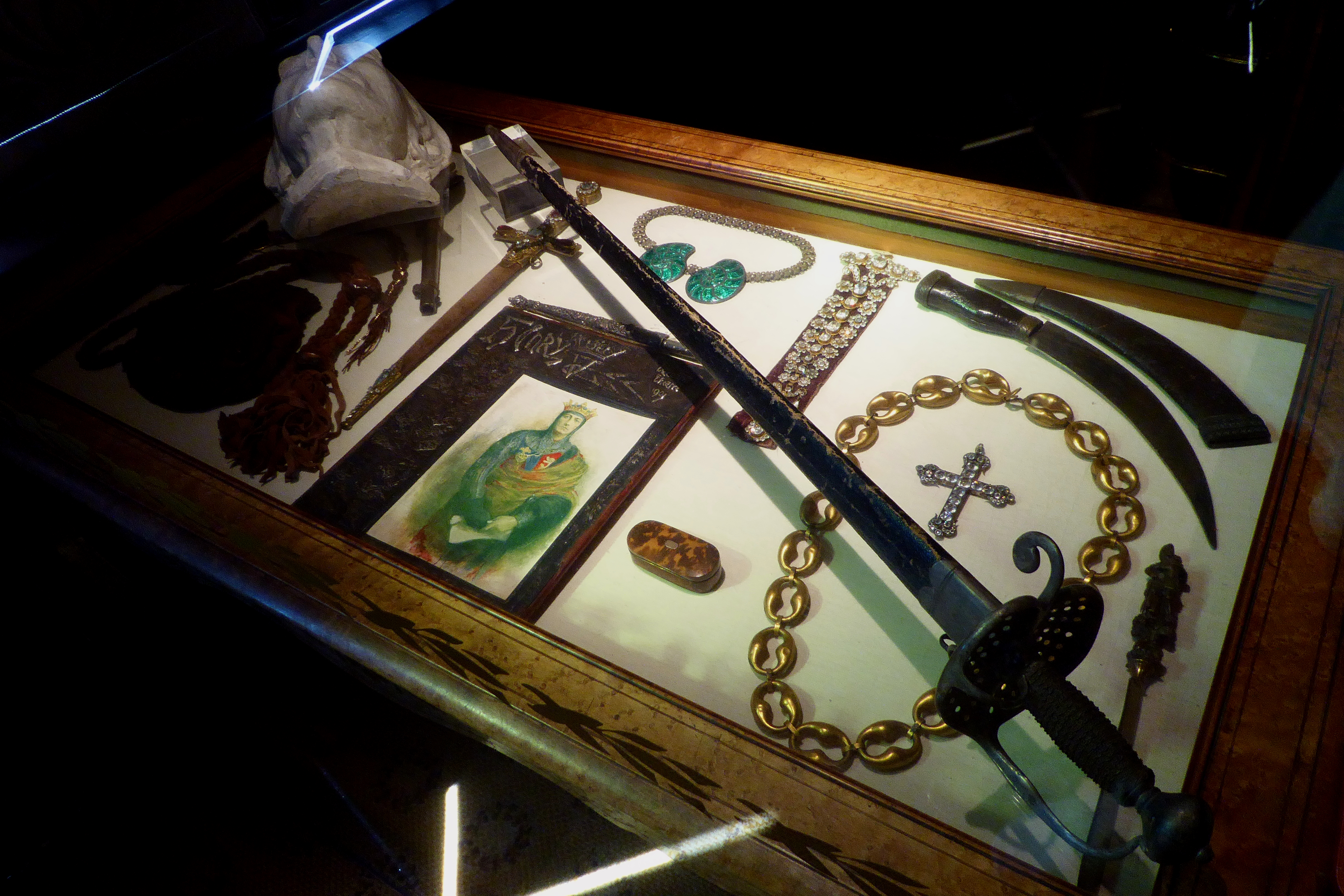
Henry Irving's props

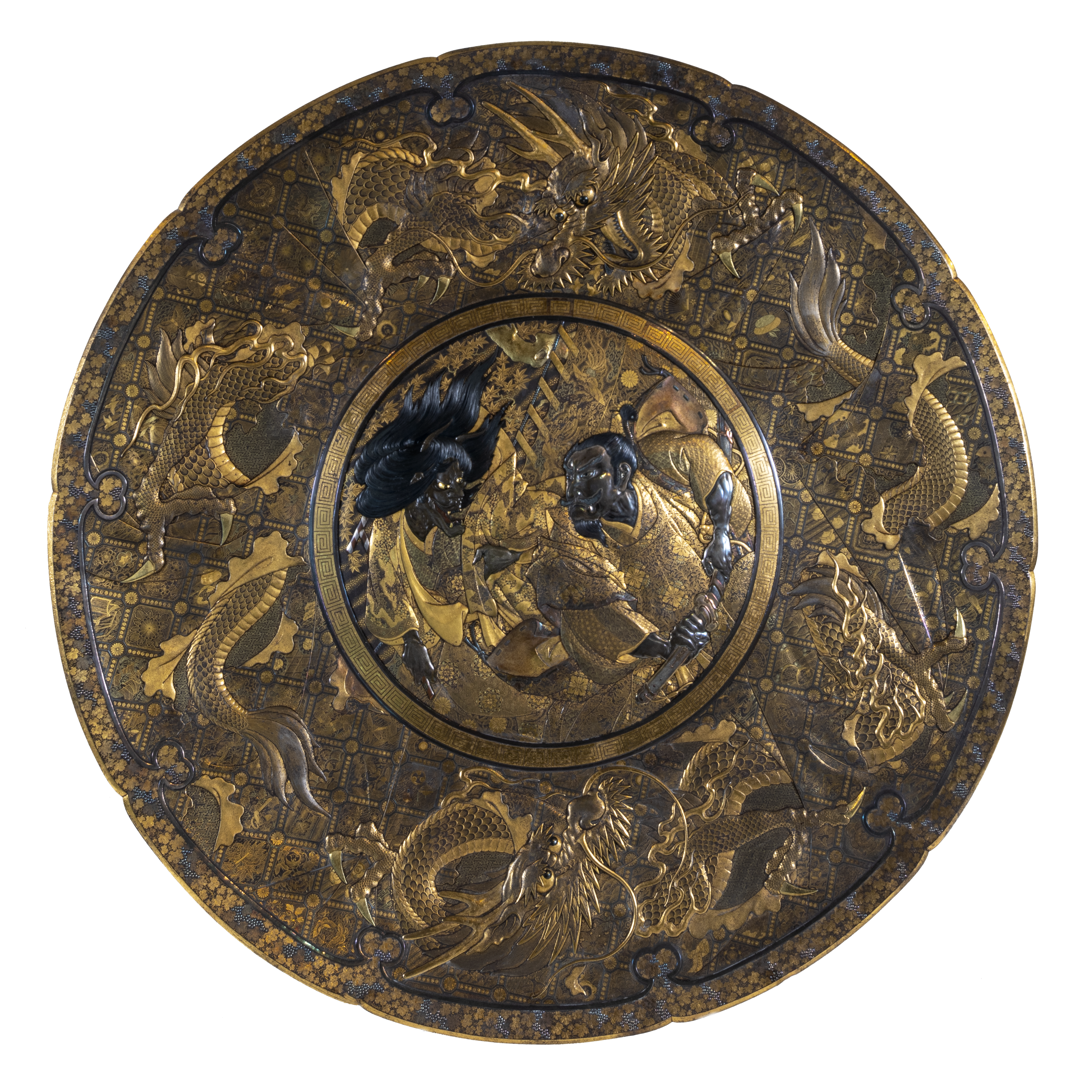
Dish decorated with a scene from the Nō play 'Momijigari' ('Maple Viewing') by Komai

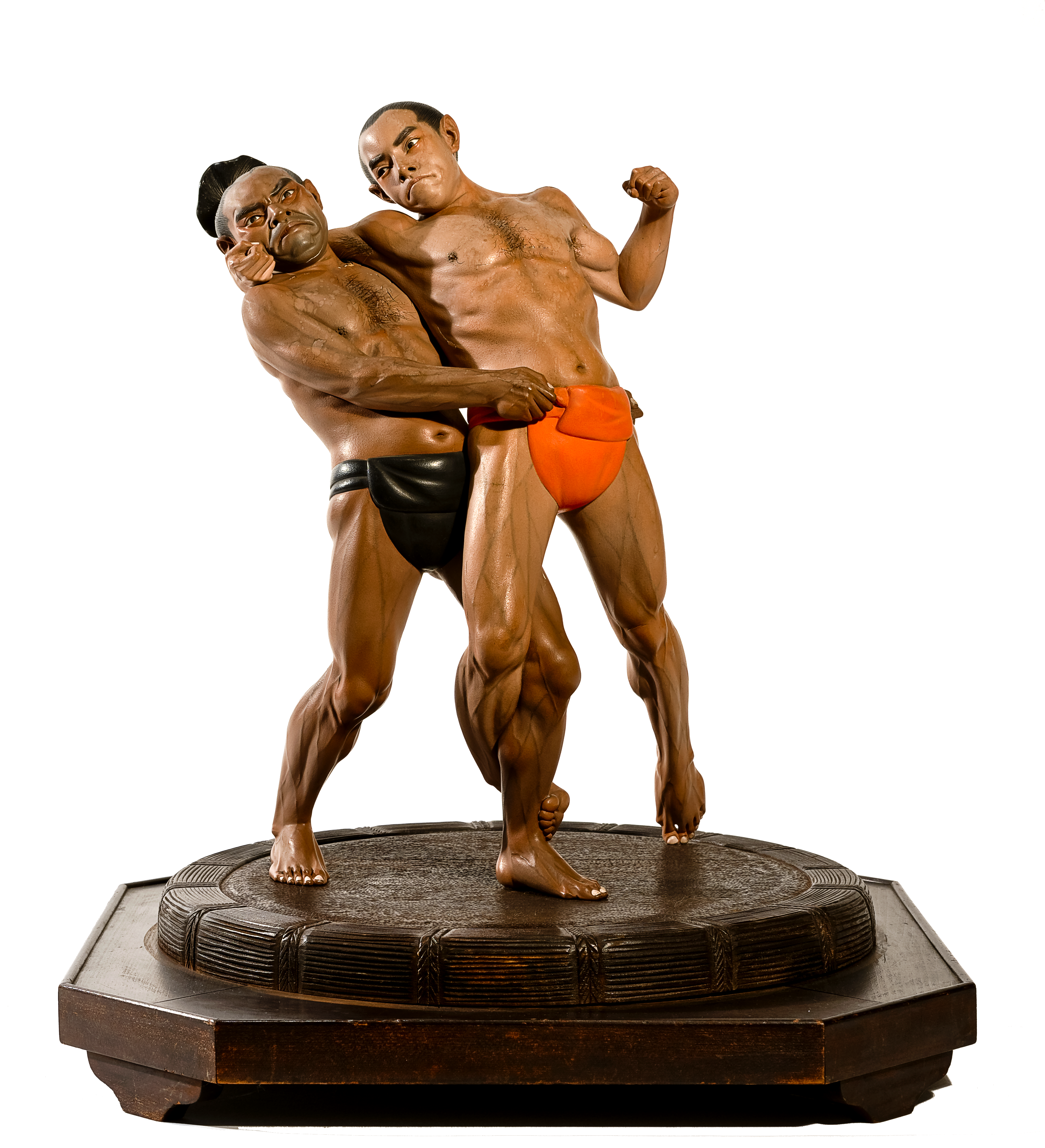
Figure group entitled 'The Wrestlers' or 'Kawatso Saburo Overcoming Matano Goro'

Iron plaque depicting a mounted Samarai battling Mongol foot soldiers by Komai

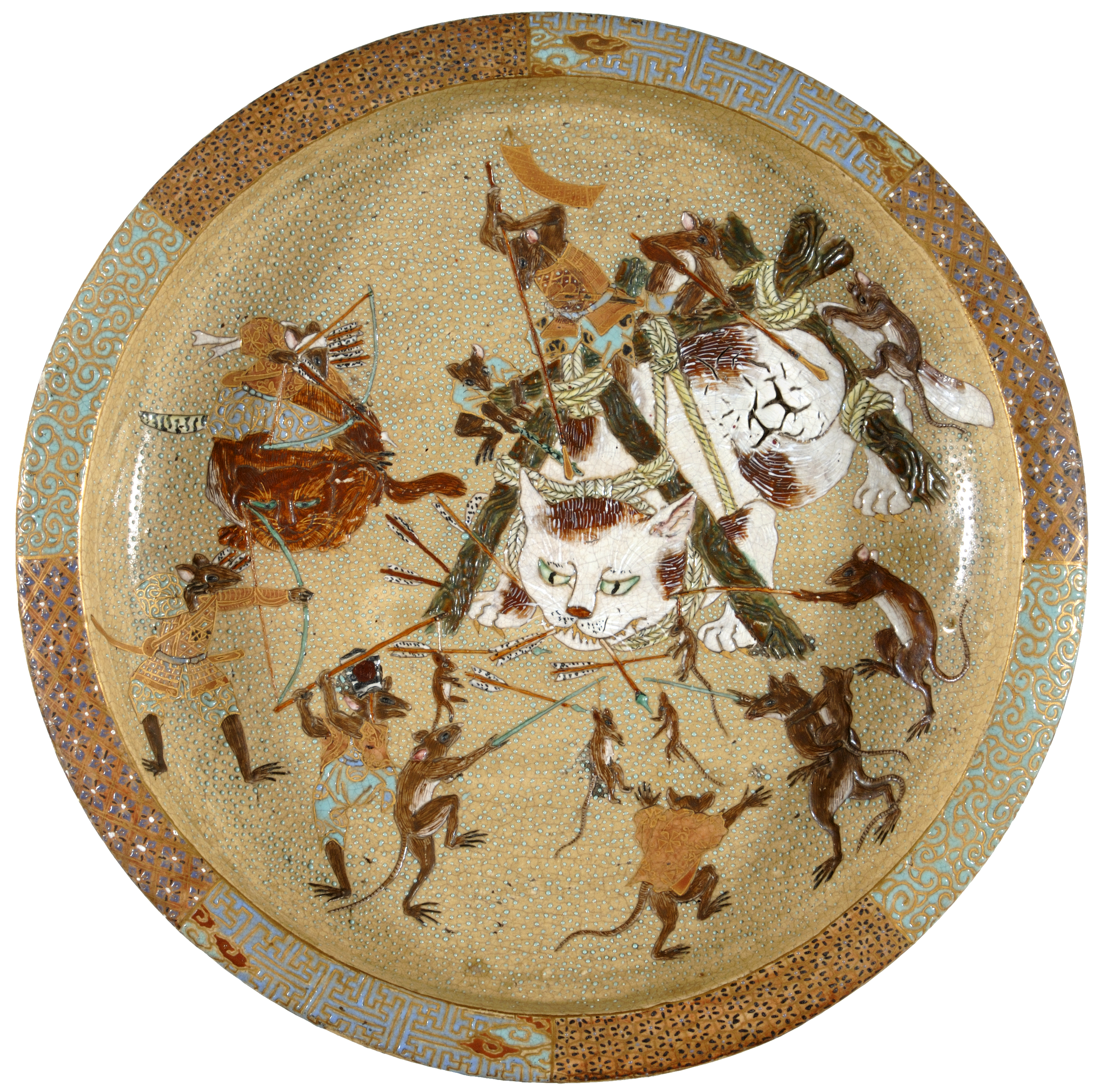
Japanese Mino ware (stoneware) plate decorated with an image of rats attacking cats after Kawanabe Kyousai (1831-1899)

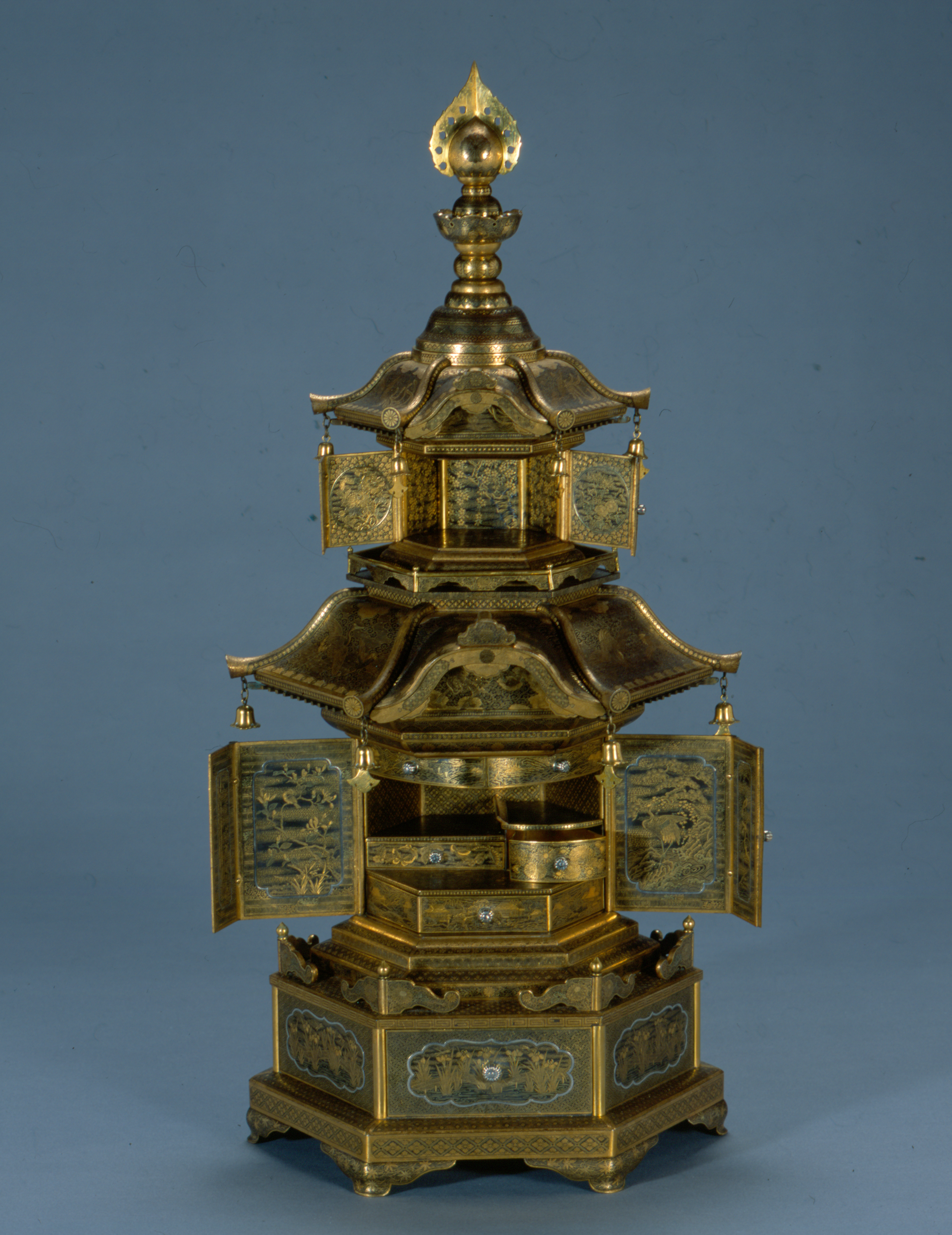
Small cabinet shaped like a pagoda by Komai

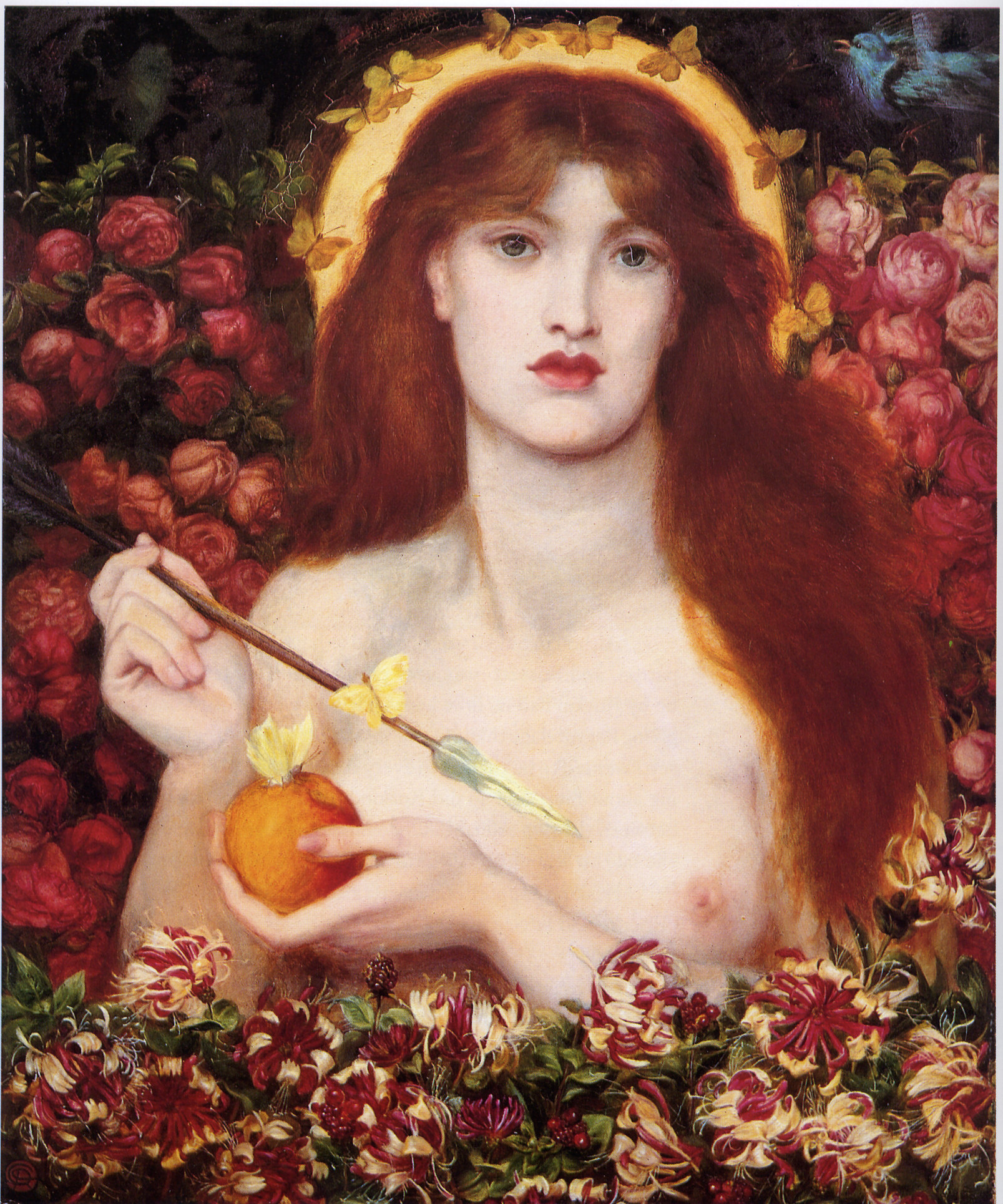
Venus Verticordia, oil on canvas by Dante Gabriel Rossetti, between 1864 and 1868

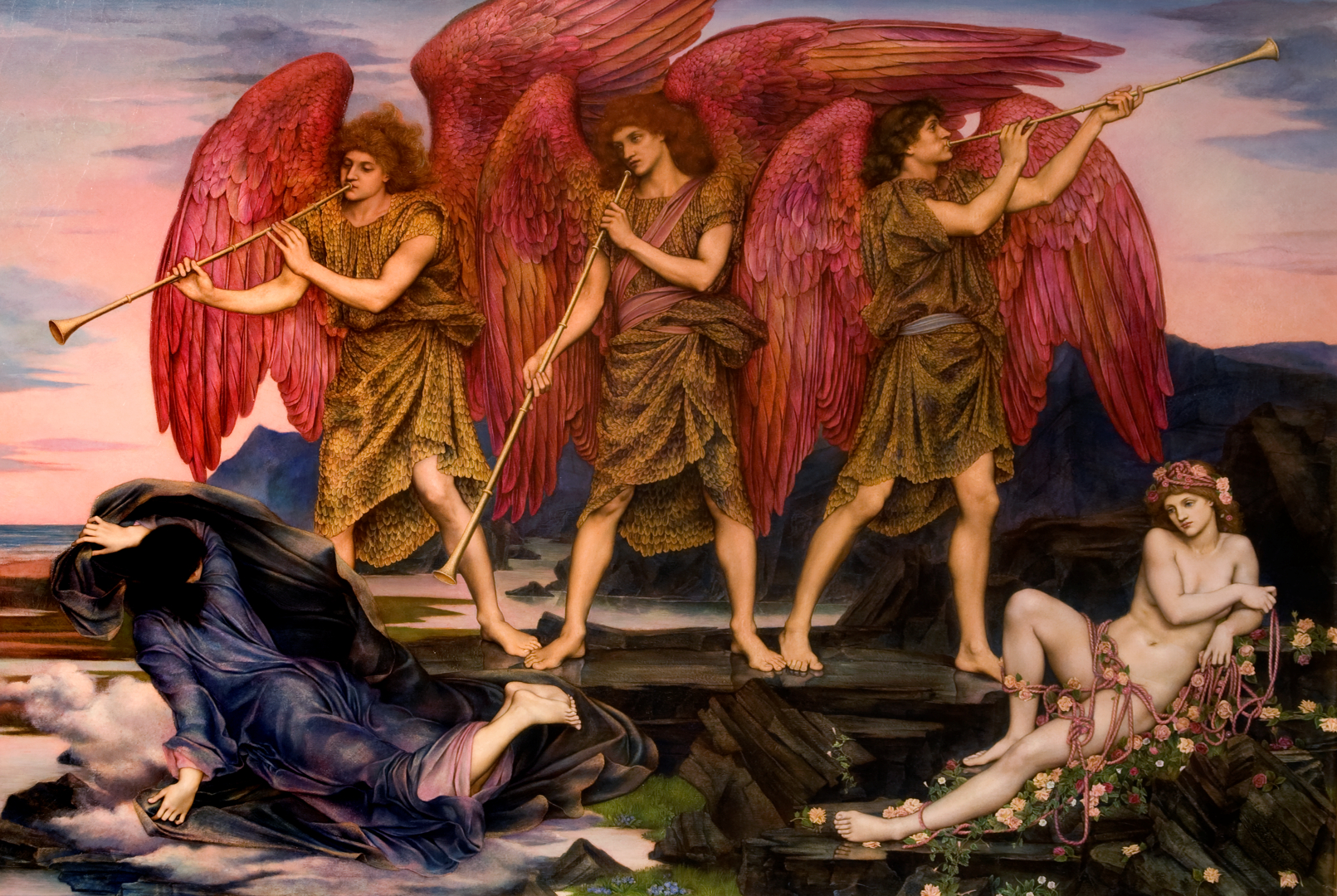
Aurora Triumphans (1877–78 or c. 1886), oil on canvas by Evelyn De Morgan
