= Musidora (disambiguation) =

Musidora (1889–1957) was a French actress, film director, and writer.

Musidora may also refer to:

- Musidora, a character in the 1727 poem Summer, from the cycle The Seasons by James Thomson
- Musidora (Gainsborough), a circa 1788 oil painting
- Musidora and Her Two Companions, a 1795 oil painting by Benjamin West
- Musidora, a character in the 1837 novel Fortunio by Théophile Gautier
- Musidora: The Bather 'At the Doubtful Breeze Alarmed', four oil paintings exhibited 1843–1846 by William Etty
- Musidora, Alberta, a Canadian hamlet
- Musidora (horse), a racehorse
