= Britomart Redeems Faire Amoret =

Painting by William Etty

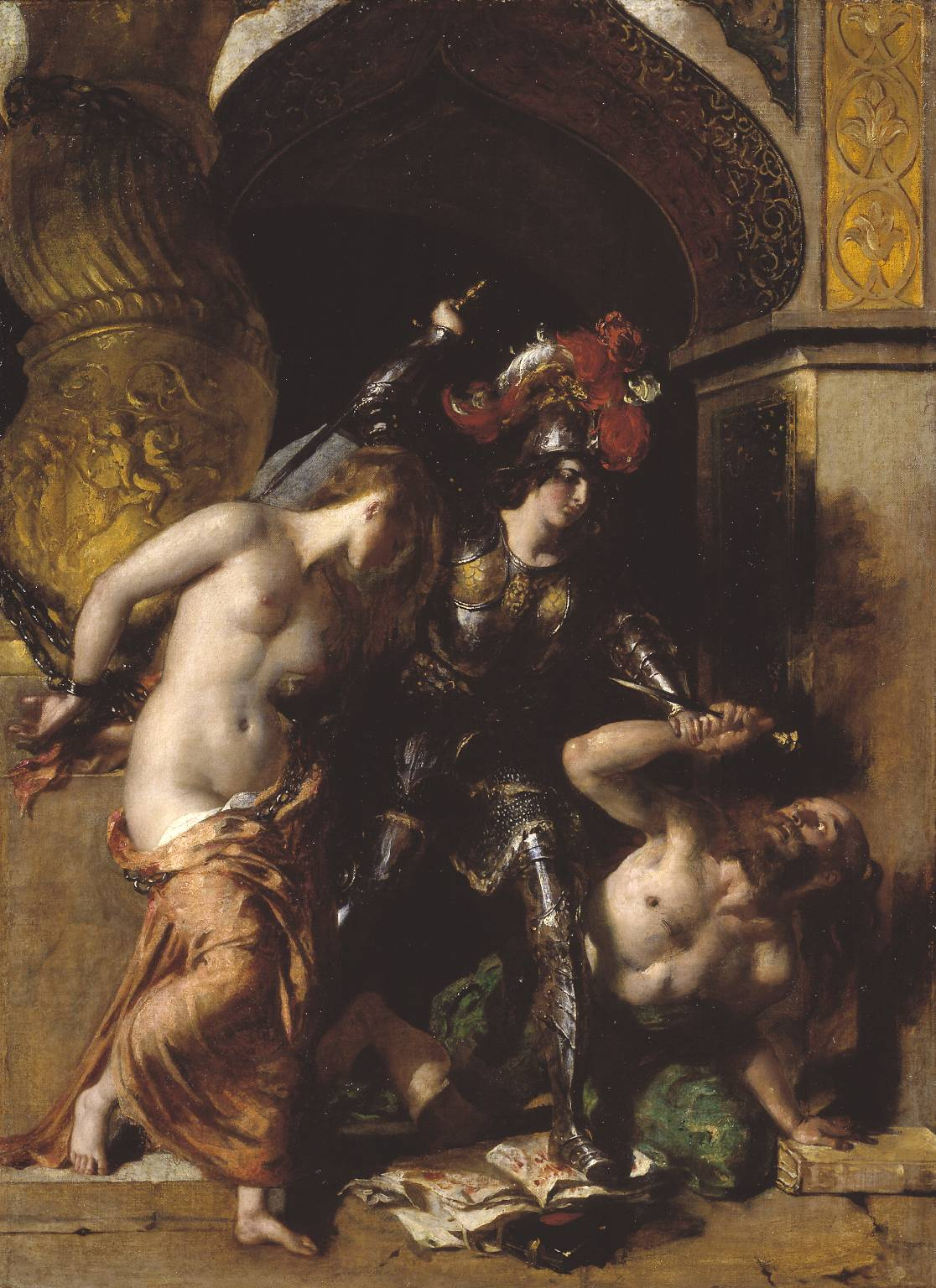
Britomart Redeems Faire Amoret, 1833, 90.8 by 66 cm (35.7 by 26.0 in)

Britomart Redeems Faire Amoret is an oil painting on canvas by English artist William Etty, first exhibited in 1833 and now in Tate Britain. Intended to illustrate the virtues of honour and chastity, it depicts a scene from Edmund Spenser's The Faerie Queene in which the female warrior Britomart slays the evil magician Busirane and frees his captive, the beautiful Amoret. In Spenser's original poem Amoret has been tortured and mutilated by the time of her rescue, but Etty disliked the depiction of violence and portrayed her as unharmed.

Despite being a depiction of an occult ritual, a violent death, a partly nude woman and strongly implied sexual torture, Britomart Redeems Faire Amoret was uncontroversial on its first exhibition in 1833 and was critically well received. Sold by Etty to a private collector in 1833, it passed through the hands of several more before entering the collection of the Lady Lever Art Gallery. In 1958, it was acquired by the Tate Gallery, and it remains in the collection of Tate Britain.

== Background ==
William Etty was born in 1787 in York, the son of a miller and baker. He showed artistic promise from an early age, but his family were financially insecure, and at the age of 12 he left school to become an apprentice printer in Hull. On completing his seven-year indenture he moved to London "with a few pieces of chalk-crayons in colours", with the aim of emulating the Old Masters and becoming a history painter. Etty gained acceptance to the Royal Academy Schools in early 1807. After a year spent studying under renowned portrait painter Thomas Lawrence, Etty returned to the Royal Academy, drawing at the life class and copying other paintings. In 1821 the Royal Academy exhibited one of Etty's works, The Arrival of Cleopatra in Cilicia (also known as The Triumph of Cleopatra). The painting was extremely well received, and many of Etty's fellow artists greatly admired him. He was elected a full Royal Academician in 1828, ahead of John Constable. He became well respected for his ability to capture flesh tones accurately in painting and for his fascination with contrasts in skin tones.

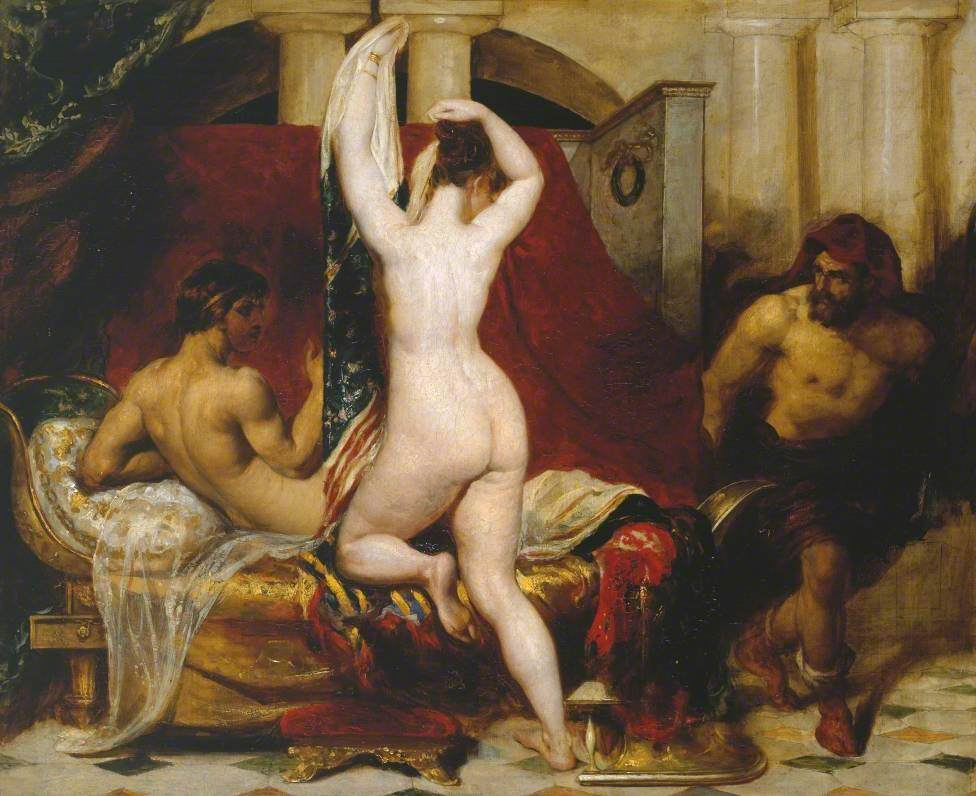
Candaules, King of Lydia, Shews his Wife by Stealth to Gyges, One of his Ministers, as She Goes to Bed (1830). By the 1830s Etty had developed a reputation for using scenes from history, mythology and literature as pretexts for painting nude figures.

Following the exhibition of Cleopatra, Etty attempted to reproduce its success, concentrating on painting further history paintings containing nude figures. He exhibited 15 paintings at the Summer Exhibition in the 1820s (including Cleopatra), and all but one contained at least one nude figure. (Note: The sole exception was Guardian Cherubs, a commissioned portrait of the children of Welbore Ellis Agar, 2nd Earl of Normanton.) In so doing Etty became the first English artist to treat nude studies as a serious art form in their own right, capable of being aesthetically attractive and of delivering moral messages. Although some nudes by foreign artists were held in private English collections, Britain had no tradition of nude painting, and the display and distribution of nude material to the public had been suppressed since the 1787 Proclamation for the Discouragement of Vice. The supposed prurient reaction of the lower classes to his nude paintings caused concern throughout the 19th century. Many critics condemned his repeated depictions of female nudity as indecent, although his portraits of male nudes were generally well received. (Etty's male nude portraits were primarily of mythological heroes and classical combat, genres in which the depiction of male nudity was considered acceptable in England.) From 1832 onwards, needled by repeated attacks from the press, Etty remained a prominent painter of nudes but made conscious efforts to try to reflect moral lessons in his work.

== Composition ==
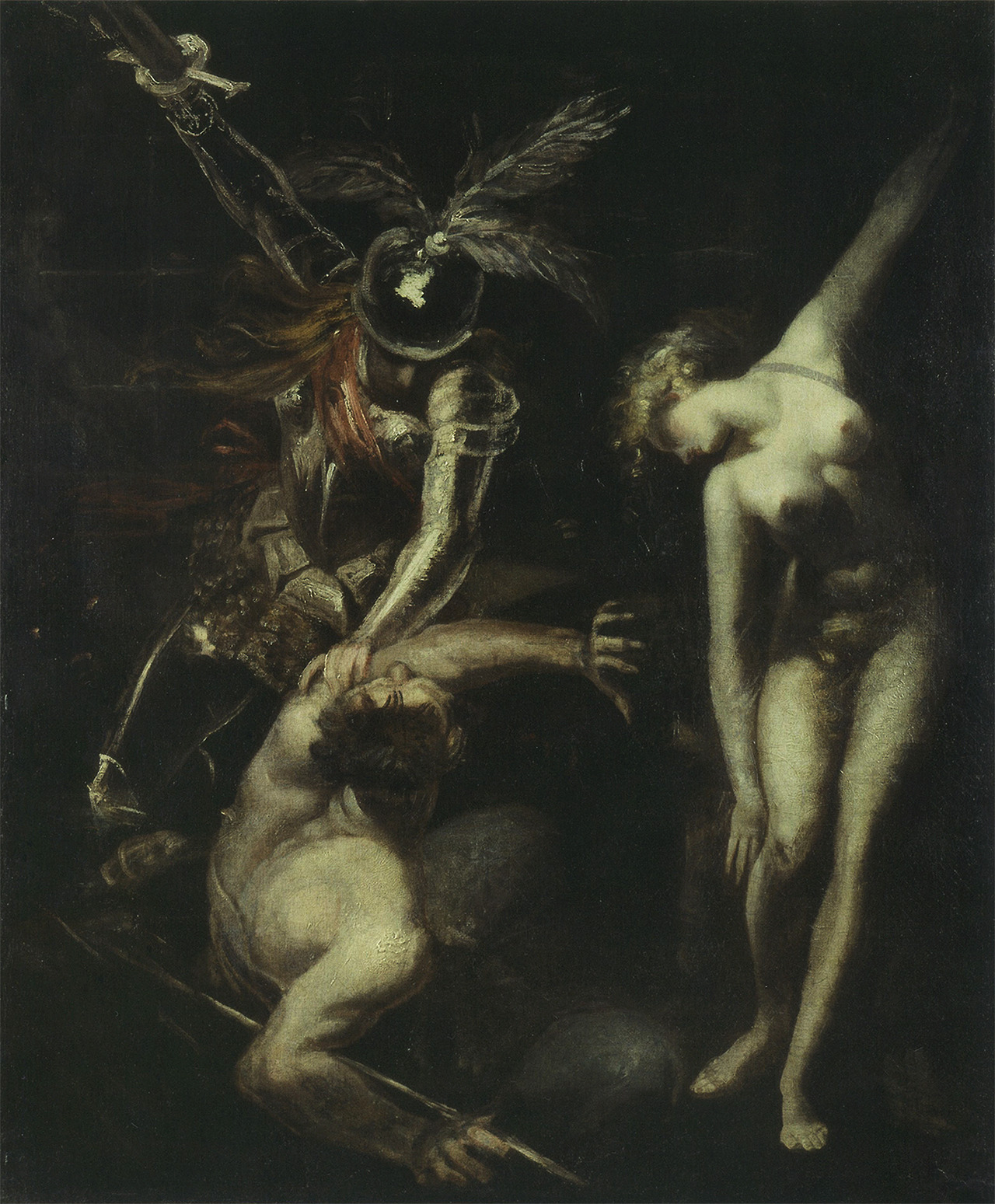
Britomart Delivering Amoretta from the Enchantment of Busirane, Henry Fuseli (1824). The Faerie Queene was an extremely popular topic with artists.

Britomart Redeems Faire Amoret illustrates a scene from book III of The Faerie Queene, a 16th-century allegorical epic poem by Edmund Spenser, in which Busirane, (Note: "Busyrane" in some versions.) an evil sorcerer, abducts the beautiful Amoret (representing married virtue), and tortures her to the point of death. The heroic female warrior Britomart (representing both chastity and Elizabeth I) battles through obstacles to reach the chamber in which Amoret is being held, and slays Busirane moments before he is able to kill Amoret.

Britomart Redeems Faire Amoret was intended by Etty to illustrate the virtues of chastity and honour. It shows the moment in which Busirane is interrupted by Britomart as he prepares to kill Amoret. Amoret is chained to a gilded Solomonic column, carved with depictions of Venus, and her clothes fall from her shoulders as she struggles. Britomart, clad in armour, enters Busirane's Moorish chamber, and tramples a blood-stained grimoire as she swings her sword. Busirane, naked from the waist up and with Chinese-style trousers and queue, (Note: Art historian Sarah Burnage suggests that the foreign appearance of Busirane and his chamber, and the implication of sexual contact between himself and Amoret, was an intentional effort to emphasise the importance of her rescue and the virtue of Britomart in killing Busirane.) falls to the floor, his blade still pointing at Amoret's heart. Unusually for Etty, Britomart is painted very thinly, with the canvas weave still visible through the paint. Art historian Alison Smith considers that this was likely inspired by Henry Fuseli, who painted a depiction of Britomart using the same style of painting.

In the original poem, Busirane had tortured and cut out the heart of the still-living Amoret by the time of her rescue. When he came to paint Britomart Redeems Faire Amoret Etty had created numerous scenes of combat and death, and would later achieve a degree of critical approbation when it became known that he visited mortuaries to sketch cadavers to ensure the accuracy of his depictions of bodies in varying stages of decomposition. However, he had an aversion to "the offensive and revolting butchery, some have delighted and even revelled in", and disliked the depiction of gratuitous violence. Consequently, in Etty's work Amoret is depicted as physically unharmed by her ordeal, although his composition implies "sadistic torture and occult sexual sorcery".

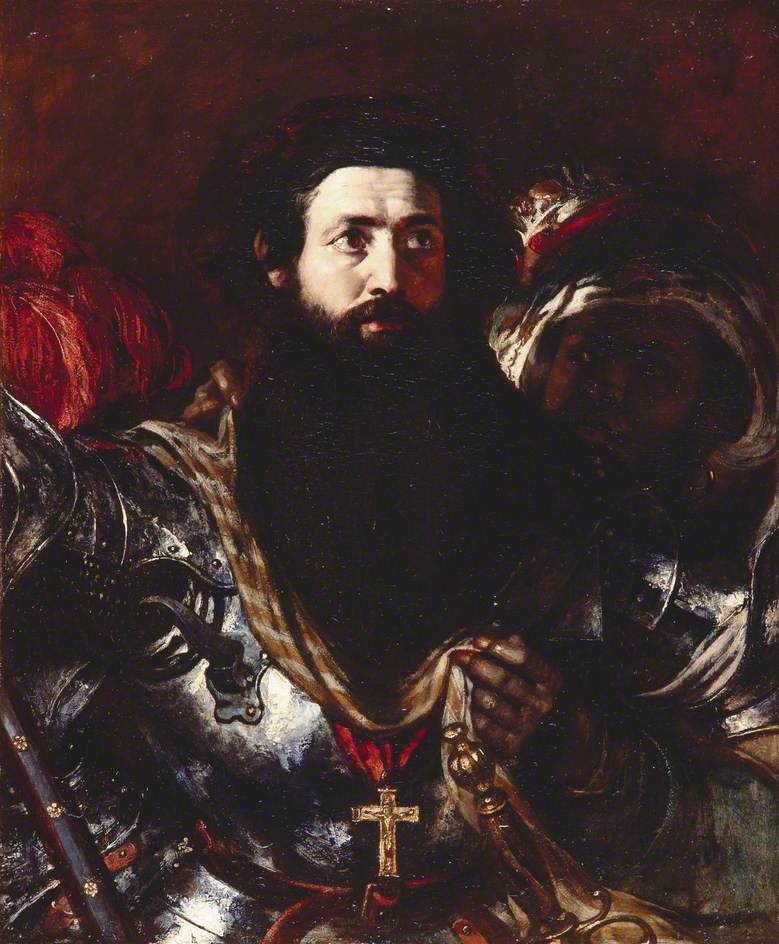
The Warrior Arming (Godfrey de Bouillon), 1835. Although best known for his treatment of flesh tones, Etty collected armour and was an admirer of Titian's studies of armoured figures, and had a great interest in the effects of light from multiple sources on polished armour.

Although there is a strong suggestion in his letters that in his early years he had a sexual encounter with one of his models and possibly also a sexual encounter of some kind while in Venice in 1823–24, Etty was devoutly Christian and famously abstemious. (Note: Professor Jason Edwards of the University of York, writing in 2011, thinks it likely Etty was secretly homosexual. It is certain that he would often meet men in public bath-houses and invite them to pose nude for him.) Alison Smith considers the composition of Britomart Redeems Faire Amoret a conscious effort on his part to praise the virtue of chastity by creating a "challenge for the presumably male viewer ... to vanquish lust and cast a pure gaze on vulnerable womanhood". Throughout his career Etty had championed the use of female models in life classes, creating some controversy, and this painting may have been intended to emphasise his belief that "To the pure in heart all things are pure".

== Reception ==
In 1832, the exhibition of Etty's Youth on the Prow, and Pleasure at the Helm had led to significant criticism in some parts of the press for its use of nude figures, with The Morning Chronicle condemning it as an "indulgence of what we once hoped a classical, but which are now convinced, is a lascivious mind". When it was exhibited at the Royal Academy Summer Exhibition in 1833, Britomart Redeems Faire Amoret received much more favourable treatment.

Although it depicted a near-nude woman, a violent death, an occult ritual and the strong implication of sexual torture, critical coverage was overwhelmingly positive. The New Monthly Magazine considered it "a wondrous and rare piece of colour", while The Gentleman's Magazine considered it "a beautiful cabinet picture" of a "truly poetical character". The most effusive praise came from The Literary Gazette:

Grace and beauty in the female form, spirited action in the knight, and fiend-like expression in the magician, unite with the splendid depth of effect produced by the architecture to render this, notwithstanding a slight tendency to blackness in some of the half-tints, one of Mr. Etty's "gems of art".

— The Literary Gazette on Britomart Redeems Faire Amoret.

== Legacy ==
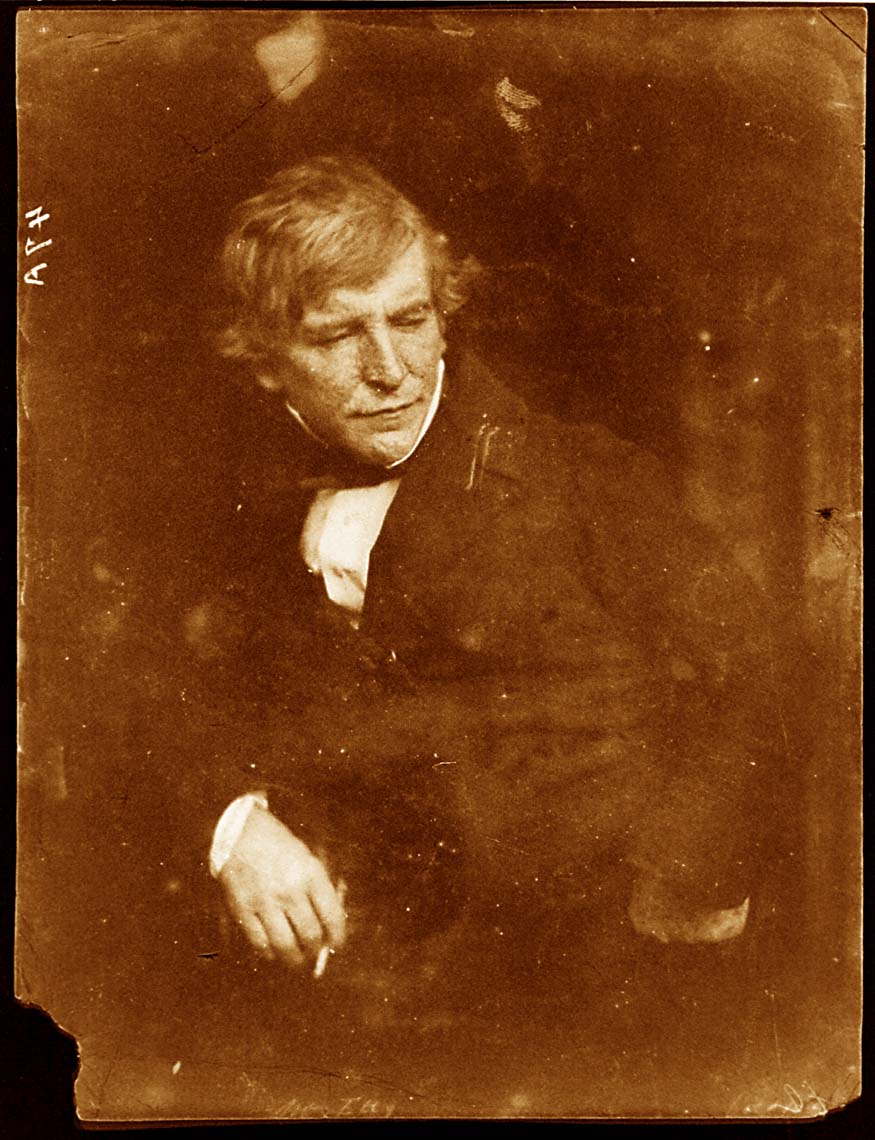
William Etty, 1844

Etty considered Britomart Redeems Faire Amoret one of his major works. Following its exhibition at the 1833 Summer Exhibition, it was exhibited in August of the same year at the Royal Manchester Institution. It was sold at this second exhibition for £157 (about £16,000 in today's terms) to an anonymous collector listed in Etty's records only as "Mr. L., Manchester". It was one of 133 Etty paintings exhibited in a major retrospective exhibition of his work at the Royal Society of Arts in June–August 1849; during this exhibition it was sold on to Lord Charles Townshend for a sum of 520 guineas (about £60,000 in today's terms).

Etty died in 1849, having continued working and exhibiting up to his death, and continued to be regarded by many as a pornographer. Charles Robert Leslie observed shortly after Etty's death that "[Etty] himself, thinking and meaning no evil, was not aware of the manner in which his works were regarded by grosser minds". Interest in him declined as new movements came to characterise painting in Britain, and by the end of the 19th century the sales prices achieved by his paintings were falling below the original values.

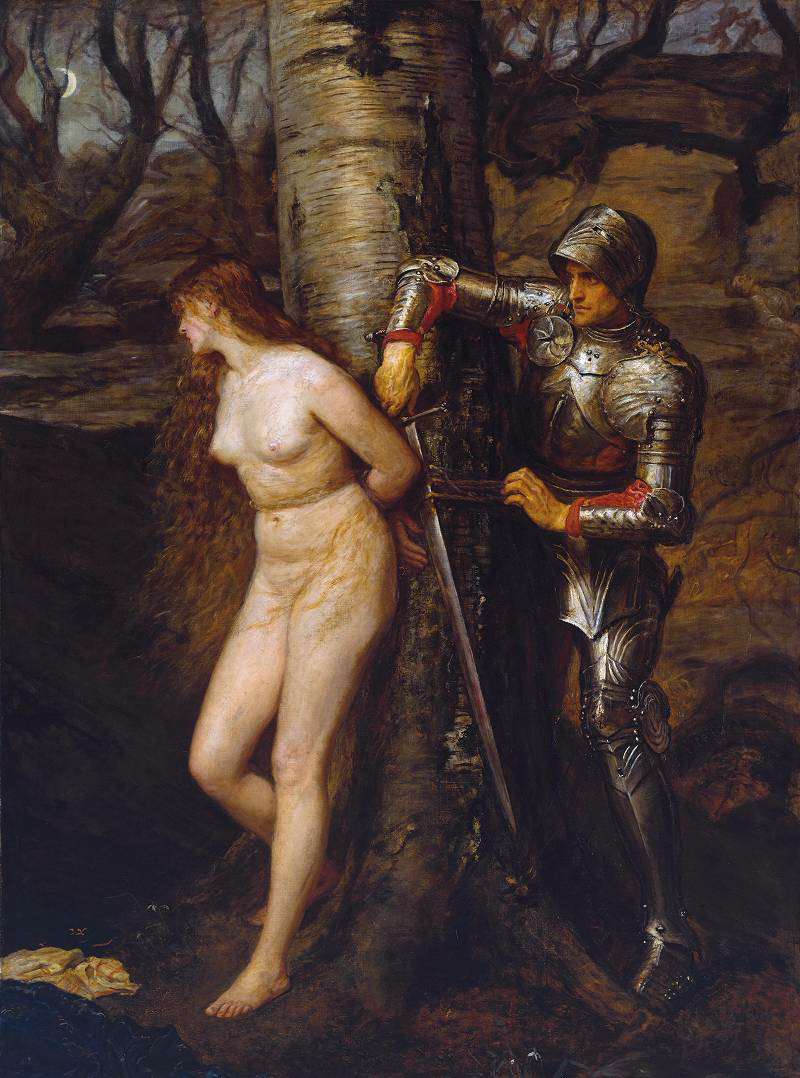
The Knight Errant, John Everett Millais, 1870

Townshend sold Britomart Redeems Faire Amoret two years after Etty's death for 510 guineas. It then passed through the hands of several owners over subsequent years, selling for a slightly lower sum each time. It was likely an influence on John Everett Millais's 1870 The Knight Errant, which also showed a distressed nude woman being rescued; although Millais disliked Etty's later works, several of his paintings were strongly influenced by the artist.

In 1919 Britomart Redeems Faire Amoret was bought for 410 guineas (about £19,000 in today's terms) by William Lever, 1st Viscount Leverhulme, and was one of the 13 Etty works transferred to the Lady Lever Art Gallery, where it remained until 1958. In 1958 it was bought by the Tate Gallery, and as of 2015 it remains in Tate Britain. It was one of five Etty paintings shown as part of Tate Britain's Exposed: The Victorian Nude exhibition, and in 2011–12 it was exhibited as part of a major retrospective of Etty's work at the York Art Gallery. In 2013 Franco Moretti argued that Britomart Redeems Faire Amoret was the "prototypical" example of the Victorian nudes of the later 19th century in which nudity ceased to be a symbol of innocence and instead became a symbol of the coercion of women at the hands of savages, criminals and tyrants.
