= Solway Firth =

Firth that forms part of the border between England and Scotland

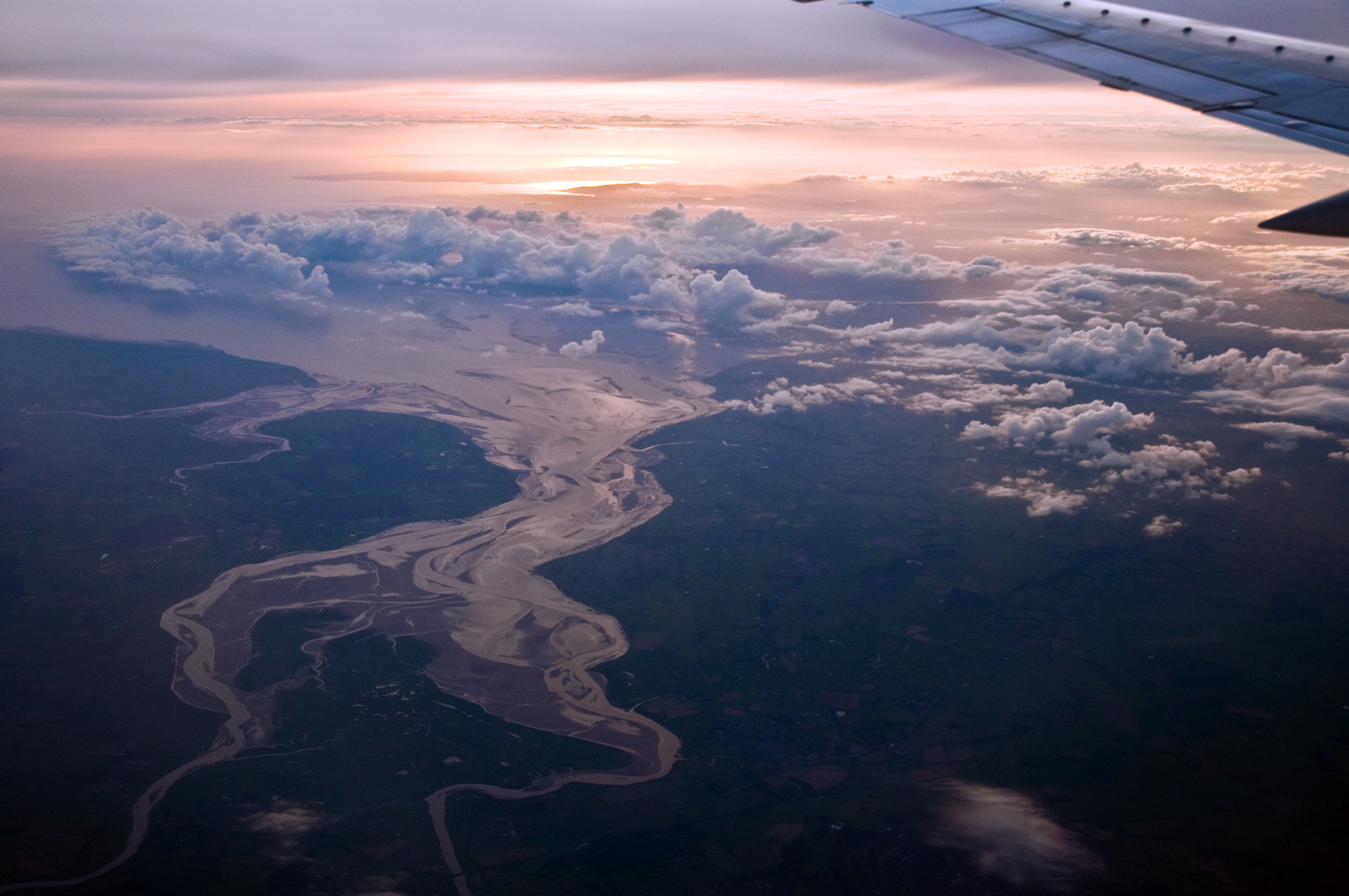
- Aerial view of the firth

- Location in Scotland
- Location: Scotland, United Kingdom
- Coordinates: 54°45′N 3°40′W

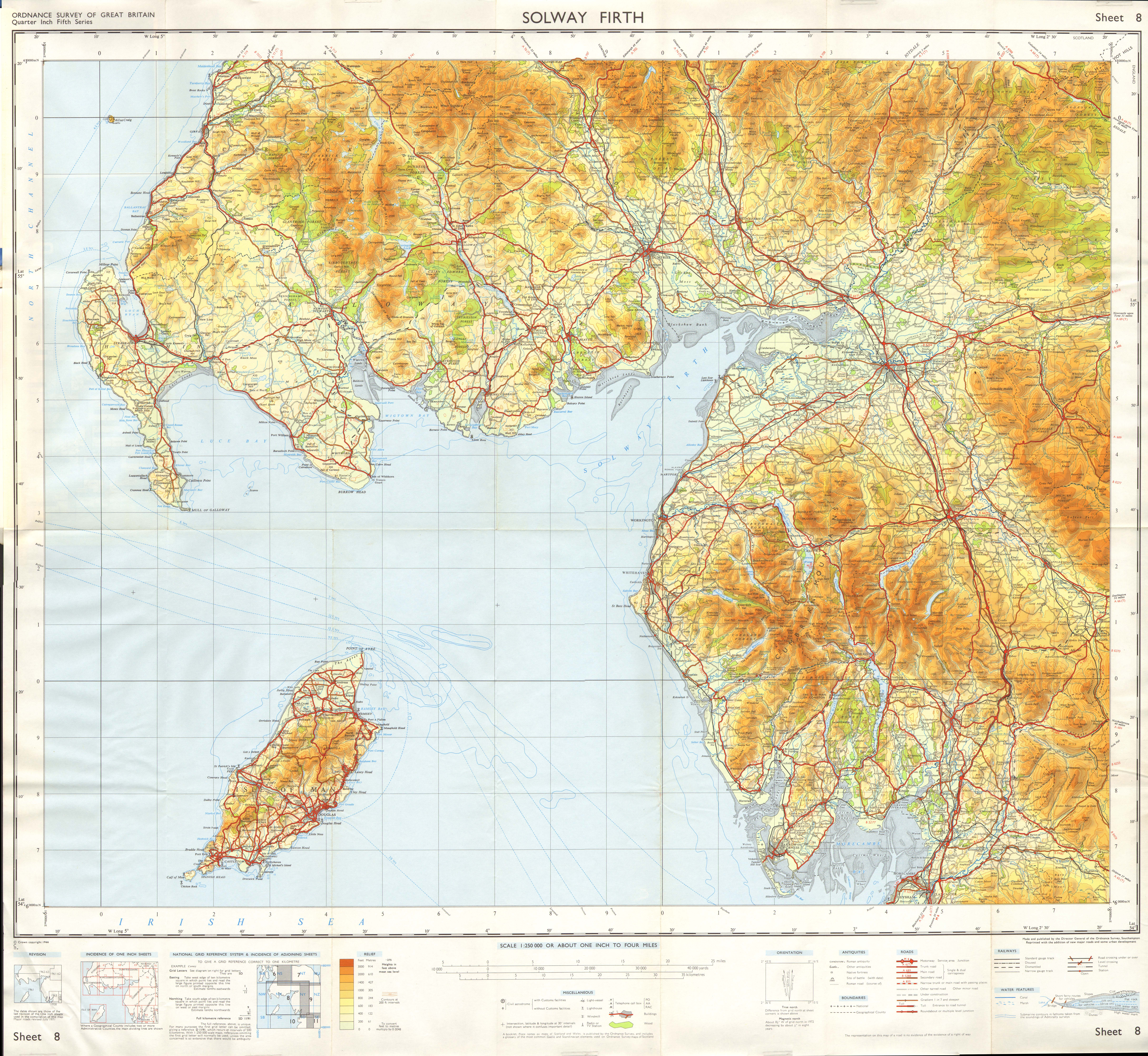
Ordnance Survey map of the firth

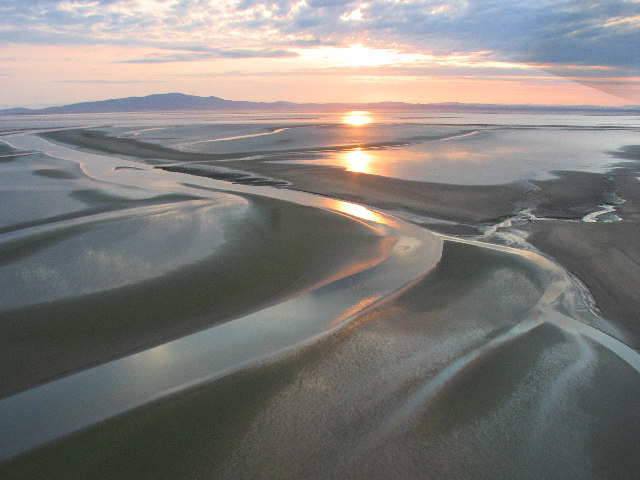
The River Wampool emptying into the firth

The Solway Firth (Scottish Gaelic: Linne Shalmhaigh) is an inlet on the west coast of Great Britain, forming part of the border between England and Scotland. (Note: See Anglo-Scottish Border for more information) The firth (a Scottish term for an inlet of the sea) divides Cumbria (including the Solway Plain) from Dumfries and Galloway. The Isle of Man is also very near to the firth. The firth comprises part of the Irish Sea.

The firth's coastline is characterised by lowland hills and small mountains. It is a mainly rural area, with mostly small villages and settlements (such as Powfoot). Fishing, hill farming, and some arable farming play a large part in the local economy, although tourism is increasing.

The northern part of the English coast of the Solway Firth was designated as an Area of Outstanding Natural Beauty, known as the Solway Coast, in 1964. Construction of the Robin Rigg Wind Farm in the firth began in 2007.

Within the firth, there are some salt marshes and mud flats that can be dangerous, due to their frequently shifting patches of quicksand.

== Natural heritage ==
There are over 290 square kilometres (110 sq mi) of Sites of Special Scientific Interest (SSSIs) in the area of the firth (one of which is Salta Moss), as well as national nature reserves — at Caerlaverock and in Cumbria. On the Cumbrian side, much of the coastline has been designated an Area of Outstanding Natural Beauty (AONB). The Solway Coast’s AONB has two separate sections: the first runs westward from just north of Carlisle to Skinburness; the second runs south from the hamlet of Beckfoot, past Mawbray and Allonby, to Crosscanonby.

In 2013, the honeycomb worm and blue mussel were designated as targets of conservation efforts, and Allonby Bay (an inlet of the Solway Firth) was put forward as a candidate for a Marine Conservation Zone.

The Solway Coast and Marine Landscape Connections Project was established in 2023 to conserve and improve six key habitats: salt marsh, seagrass meadows, oyster reefs, sand dunes, burns and coastal woodlands. Funding for ten years of activity has been secured from the National Lottery Heritage Fund. The project is led by Dumfries & Galloway Council's Environment Team and is being developed with seven partner organisations.

== Long-distance walking route ==
A 53-mile (85 km) long-distance walking route, the Annandale Way, runs through Annandale, from the source of the River Annan, in the Moffat Hills, to the Solway Firth; it was opened in September 2009.

== Islands in the Solway ==
Unlike other parts of the west coast of Scotland, the Solway Firth has only a few islands. They are:

- Hestan Island
- Rough Island
- Little Ross
- The so-called Isle of Whithorn (which is actually a peninsula)
- The Islands of Fleet

== Rivers ==
The Solway Firth is the estuary of the River Eden and the River Esk.

Below are links to lists of the other rivers that flow into the firth:

- in England
- in Scotland

== History ==
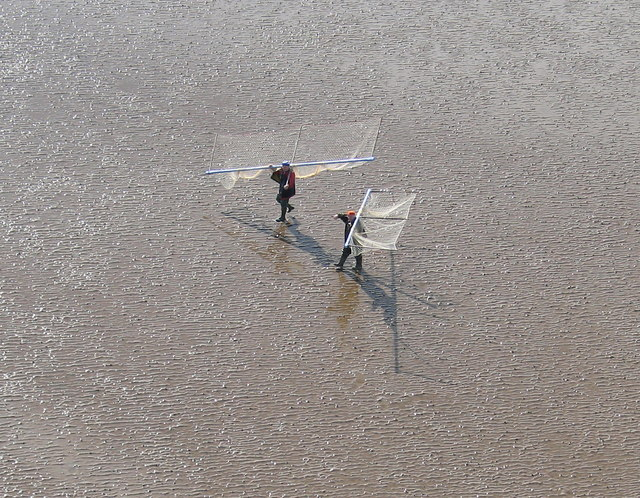
Haaf net fishing in the Solway Firth

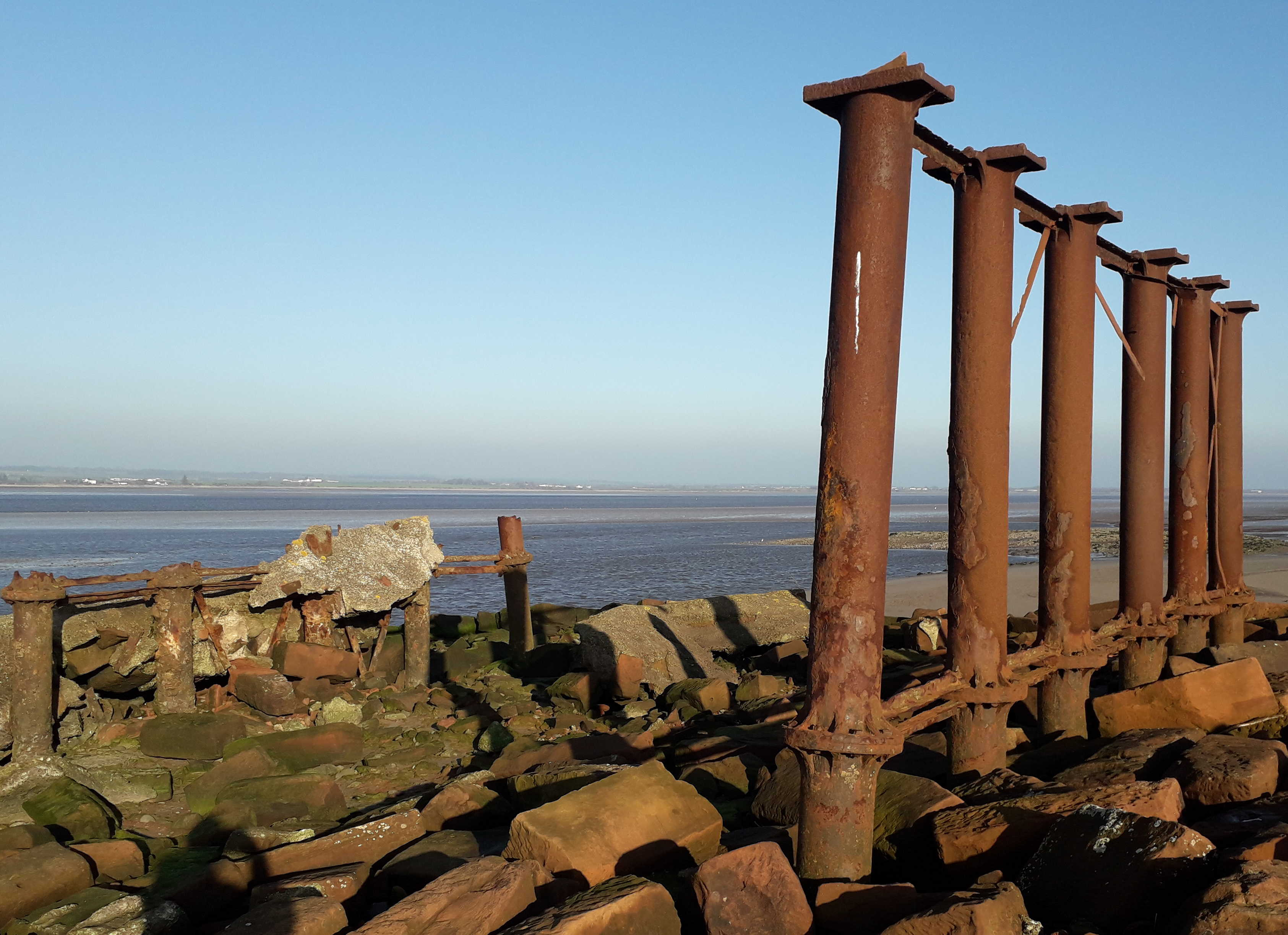
Remains of Solway viaduct - English side 2018

The name "Solway" (recorded as Sulewad in 1218) is of Scandinavian origin, and was originally the name of a ford across the mud flats at Eskmouth. The first element of the name is probably from the Old Norse word súl 'pillar', referring to the Lochmaben Stane, though it may instead be from súla, meaning 'solan goose'. Súl and súla both have long vowels, but the early spellings of Solway indicate a short vowel in the first element. This may be due to the shortening of an originally long vowel in the Middle English period but may also represent an original short vowel. If this is the case, the first element may be *sulr, an unrecorded word cognate with Old English sol 'muddy, pool', or a derivative of sulla, meaning 'to swill'.

The second element of the name is from the Old Norse vað, meaning 'ford' (which is cognate with the modern English word wade).

The area had three fords: the Annan or Bowness Wath, the Dornock Wath (once called the Sandywathe), and the main one —the Solewath (also called the Solewath or the Sulewad).

A wooden lighthouse was built in 1841 at Barnkirk Point (grid reference NY 1903 6425). It was destroyed by fire in 1960.

On 9 March 1876, a 79-ton French lugger St. Pierre, was stranded – and finally declared lost – on Blackshaw Bank, an ill-defined feature which extends for a considerable distance on both sides of the channel of the River Nith.

Between 1869 and 1921, the estuary was crossed by the Solway Junction Railway on a 1780 m (5850 ft) iron viaduct. The line was built to carry iron ore from the Whitehaven area to Lanarkshire and was financed and operated by the Caledonian Railway of Scotland. After the railway, which was not a financial success, ceased operating in 1921, the railway bridge became a popular footpath, enabling residents of Scotland to easily cross into England, where alcoholic drink was legally available seven days a week. (Scotland was dry on Sundays at the time.) The viaduct was demolished between 1931 and 1933.

The Ministry of Defence had by 1999 fired more than 6,350 depleted uranium rounds into the Solway Firth from its testing range at Dundrennan Range.

== The Martyr of the Solway ==
Margaret Wilson was a Scottish Covenanter who was executed by drowning in the Solway Firth in 1685. She was tied to a stake in the water and left to drown with the incoming tide. Wilson lived during a time of great turmoil in Scotland, with the Covenanter movement opposing the episcopalian governance of the Church of Scotland. The Covenanters sought to maintain their Presbyterian faith and resist the authority of the monarch.

John Everett Millais created an illustration, a wood engraving, depicting the Scottish martyr Margaret Wilson, tied to a stake in the surf at Solway, because – as a Covenanter – she refused to acknowledge James II as head of the church. It was engraved by the workshop of Joseph Swain and published in Once a Week in 1862. Of further interest is John Everett Millais' painting, ;The Knight Errant (1870) original section was later sewn into another canvas and exhibited in 1872 as The Martyr of the Solway (Walker Art Gallery, Liverpool; plate), which is similar to the woodcut noted here.

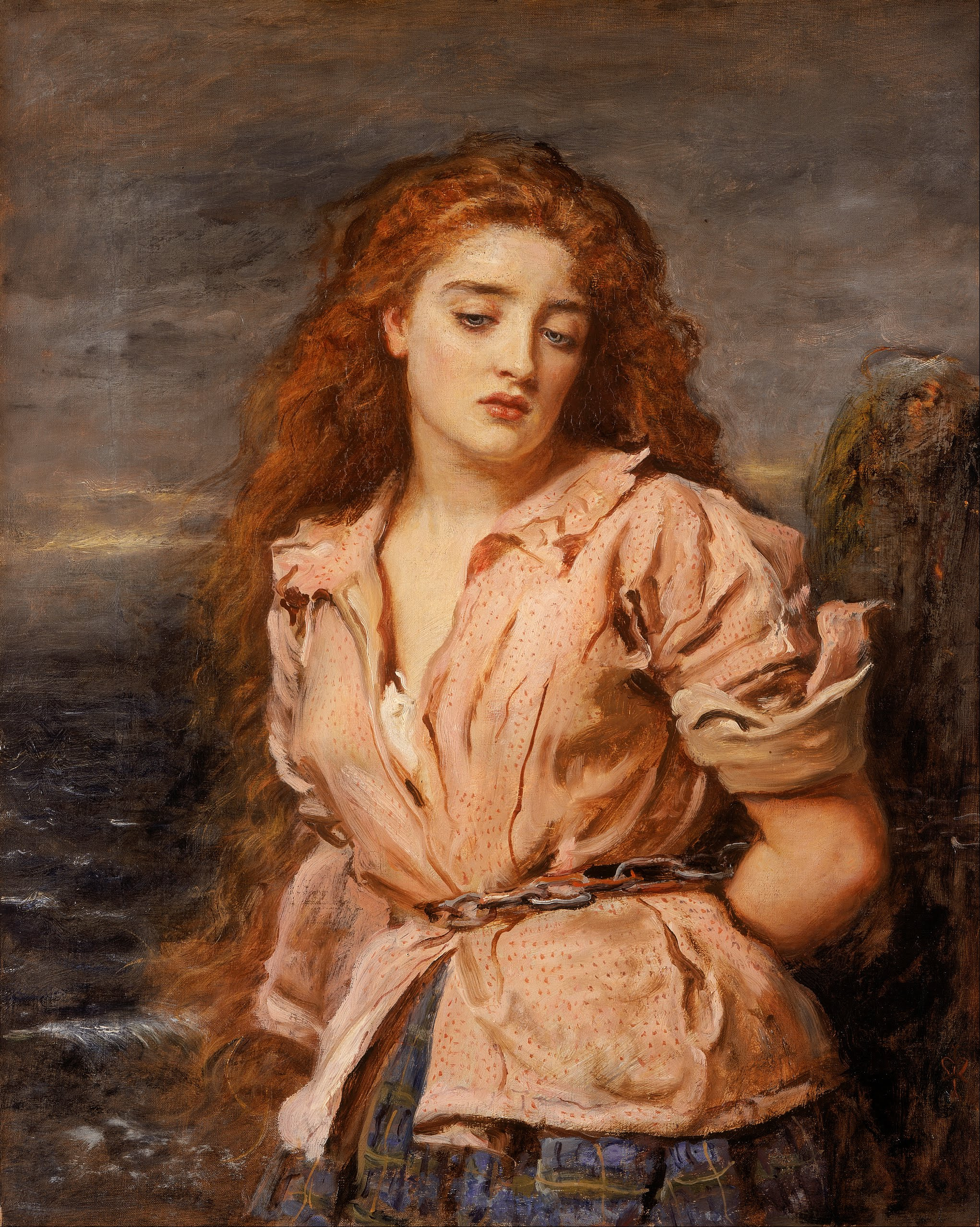
The Martyr of the Solway by John Everett Millais, 1871

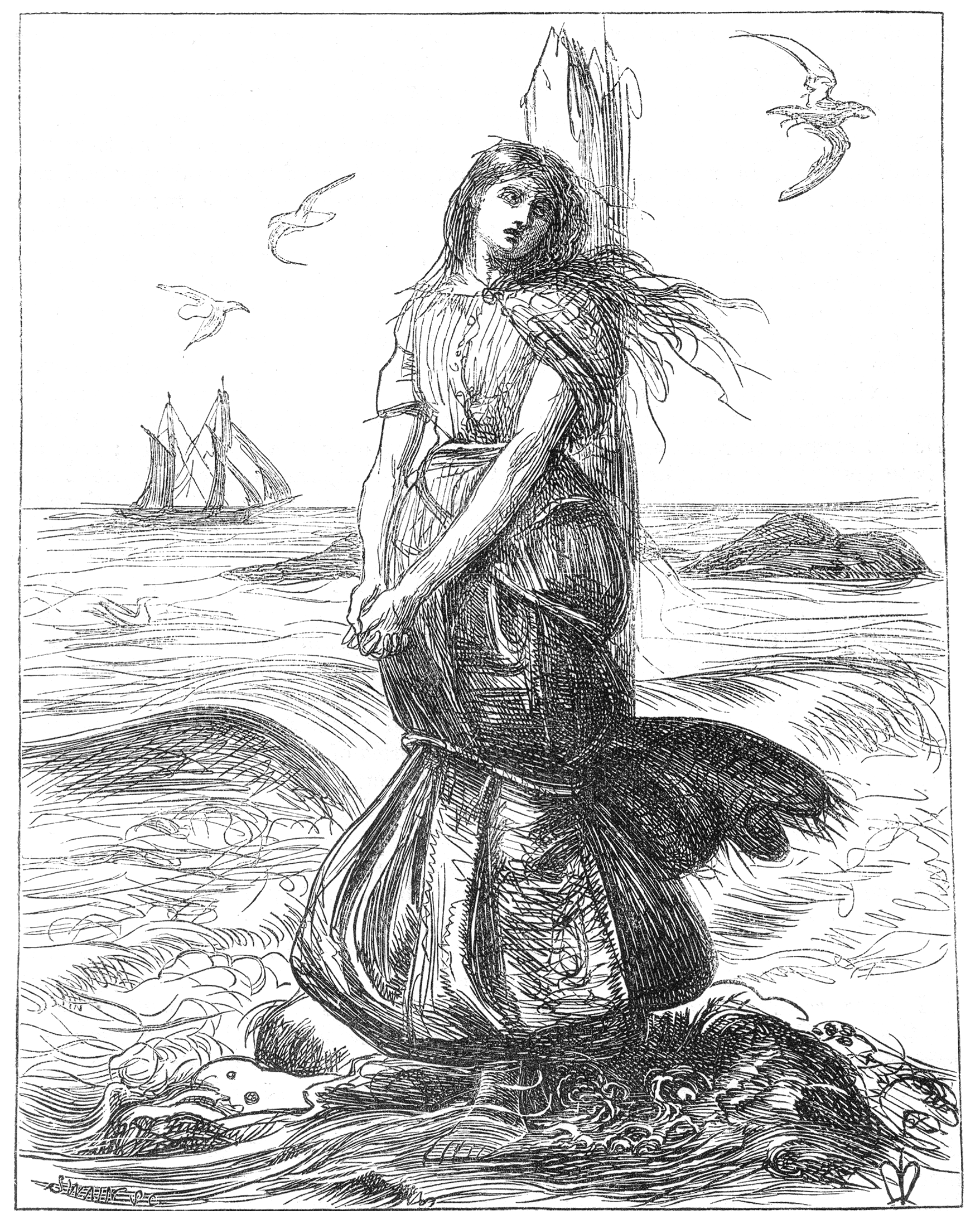
The martyrdom of Margaret Wilson in the Solway Firth.

== In popular culture ==
- The Solway Firth has been used as the location for films. For example, the 1973 film The Wicker Man was filmed around Kirkcudbright and Burrow Head on the Wigtownshire coast.
- In July 2019, the American metal band Slipknot released a song called “Solway Firth” that is named after the firth.

== See also ==
- Anglo-Scottish border
- Solway Plain
- Wildfowl and Wetlands Trust
- Solway Firth Spaceman
