= Musidora: The Bather 'At the Doubtful Breeze Alarmed' =

Four paintings by William Etty

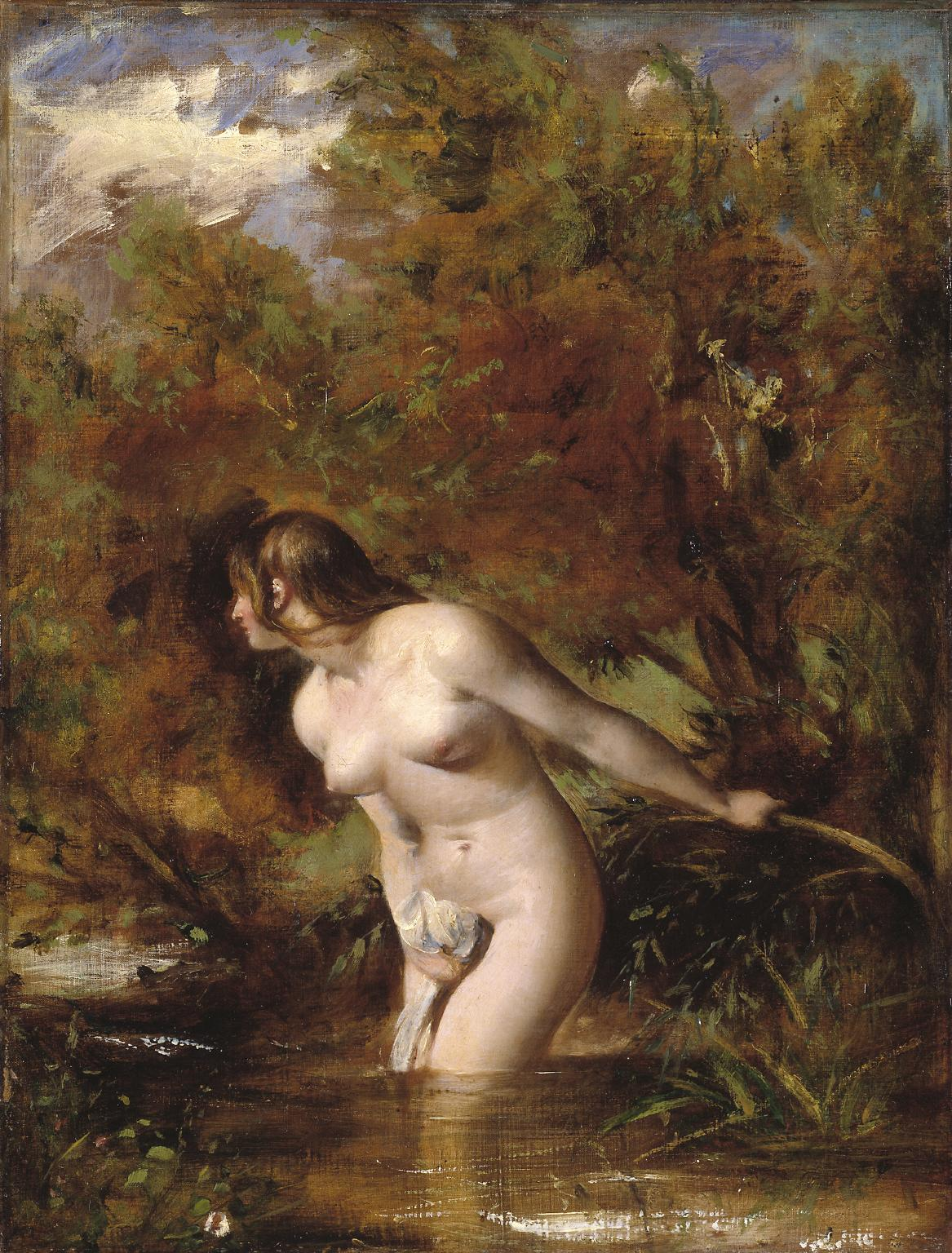
Musidora: The Bather 'At the Doubtful Breeze Alarmed' by William Etty, Tate version, exhibited 1846, 65.1 by 50.2 cm (25.6 by 19.8 in)

Musidora: The Bather 'At the Doubtful Breeze Alarmed', also known as The Bather, is a name given to four nearly identical oil paintings on canvas by English artist William Etty. The paintings illustrate a scene from James Thomson's 1727 poem Summer in which a young man accidentally sees a young woman bathing naked and is torn between his desire to look and his knowledge that he ought to look away. The scene was popular with English artists as it was one of the few legitimate pretexts to paint nudes at a time when the display and distribution of nude imagery was suppressed.

With minor differences in the background landscape, the four paintings are identical in composition. The first version was exhibited in 1843. Two versions are in public collections, one in Tate Britain and one in the Manchester Art Gallery; one of these was painted in 1844 and first exhibited in 1846 and the other was painted at around the same time; it is not known which is the version exhibited in 1846. A fourth version is of poorer quality and may be a later copy by a student.

Musidora was extremely well received when first exhibited and considered one of the finest works by an English artist. Etty died in 1849 and his work rapidly went out of fashion. At the same time, the topic of Musidora itself became a cliché in the consideration of the art world, and from the 1870s Thomson's writings faded into obscurity. Etty's Musidora is likely to have influenced The Knight Errant by John Everett Millais, but other than that has had little influence on subsequent works. The Tate's version of the painting was exhibited in major exhibitions in 2001–2002 in London and in 2011–2012 in York.

== Background ==
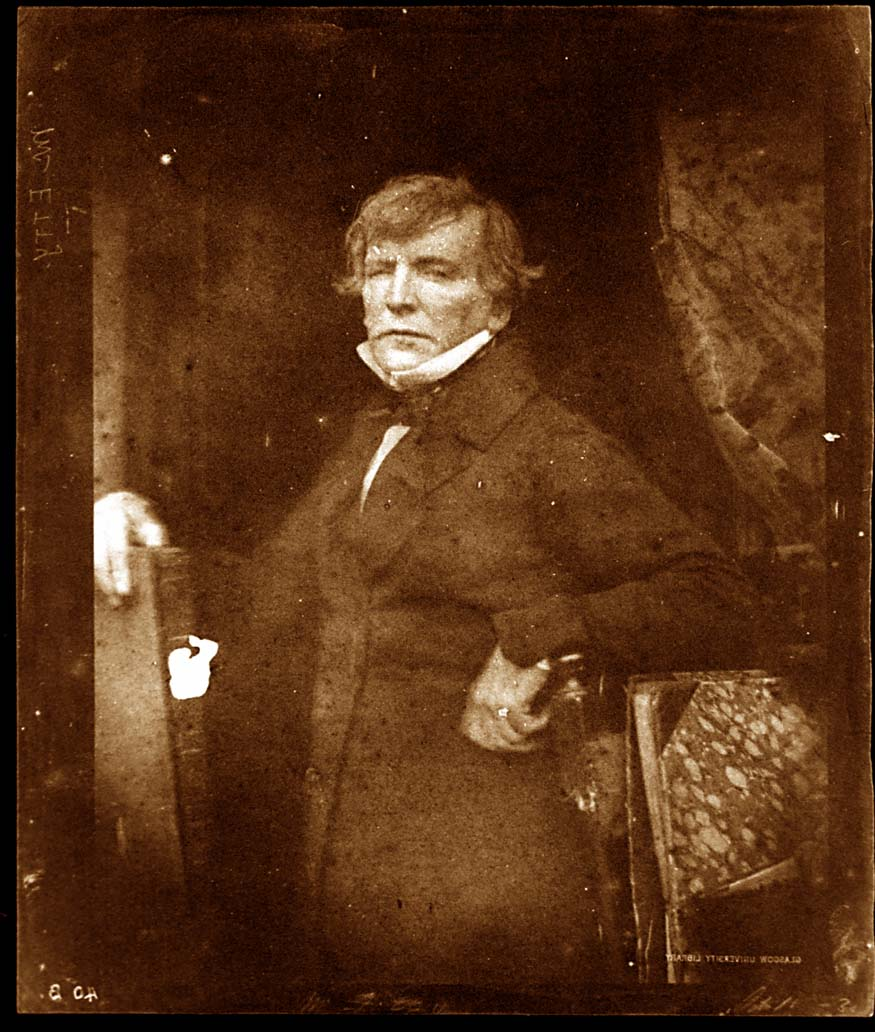
William Etty in 1844, around the time Musidora was painted

William Etty (1787–1849), the seventh child of a York baker and miller, began his career as an apprentice printer in Hull at the age of 11. On completing his seven-year apprenticeship he moved to London "with a few pieces of chalk crayons", with the intention of becoming a history painter in the tradition of the Old Masters, and studied under renowned artist Thomas Lawrence. Strongly influenced by the works of Titian and Rubens, Etty submitted numerous paintings to the Royal Academy of Arts and the British Institution, all of which were either rejected or received little attention when exhibited.

In 1821 the Royal Academy accepted and exhibited one of Etty's works, The Arrival of Cleopatra in Cilicia (also known as The Triumph of Cleopatra), which depicted a large number of nude figures. Cleopatra was extremely well received, and many of Etty's fellow artists greatly admired him. He was elected a full Royal Academician in 1828, ahead of John Constable. He became well respected for his ability to capture flesh tones accurately in painting, and for his fascination with contrasts in skin tones. Following the exhibition of Cleopatra, over the next decade Etty tried to replicate its success by painting nudes in biblical, literary and mythological settings. Between 1820 and 1829 Etty exhibited 15 paintings, of which 14 included nude figures.

While some nudes by foreign artists were held in private English collections, the country had no tradition of nude painting and the display and distribution of such material to the public had been suppressed since the 1787 Proclamation for the Discouragement of Vice. Etty was the first British artist to specialise in painting nudes, and many critics condemned his repeated depictions of female nudity as indecent, although his portraits of male nudes were generally well received. (Note: Etty's male nude portraits were primarily of mythological heroes and classical combat, genres in which the depiction of male nudity was considered acceptable in England.) From 1832 onwards, needled by repeated attacks from the press, Etty remained a prominent painter of nudes, but made conscious efforts to try to reflect moral lessons in his work.

== Subject ==
How durst thou risk the soul-distracting view
As from her naked limbs of glowing white,
Harmonious swelled by nature's finest hand,
In folds loose-floating fell the fainter lawn,
And fair exposed she stood, shrunk from herself,
With fancy blushing, at the doubtful breeze
Alarmed, and starting like the fearful fawn?
Then to the flood she rushed.

— These lines from Summer accompanied the painting on its original exhibit.

Musidora is based on Summer, a poem by the Scottish poet and playwright James Thomson (best known today as the author of Rule, Britannia!). Summer was initially published in 1727 and was republished in an altered form in 1730 along with Thomson's Winter (1726), Spring (1728) and Autumn (1730) as The Seasons. Although the individual poems attracted little interest on their release, The Seasons proved critically and commercially successful once completed, and Thomson began to associate with important and influential London political and cultural figures. In June 1744 Thomson published a drastically revised version of The Seasons, which became extremely influential over the following century. Joseph Haydn wrote a major oratorio based on the poem, significant artists including Thomas Gainsborough, J. M. W. Turner and Richard Westall painted scenes from it, and over 400 editions of The Seasons in a number of languages were published between 1744 and 1870.

The painting depicts a scene from Summer in which the young Damon sits thinking by a stream on a hot summer's day. The beautiful Musidora strips naked to cool down by bathing in the stream, not knowing that Damon can see her. Damon is torn between his desire to watch her and the "delicate refinement" of knowing he should avert his gaze. Damon decides to respect her modesty and leaves a note on the riverbank reading "Bathe on, my fair, / Yet unbeheld save by the sacred eye / Of faithful love: I go to guard thy haunt; / To keep from thy recess each vagrant foot / And each licentious eye". Musidora sees the paper and panics, but on reading it and realising that it has been written by Damon, feels admiration for his behaviour as well as a surge of pride that her own beauty can provoke such a reaction. She leaves him a note in turn, reading "Dear youth! sole judge of what these verses mean, / By fortune too much favoured, but by love, / Alas! not favoured less, be still as now / Discreet: the time may come you need not fly."

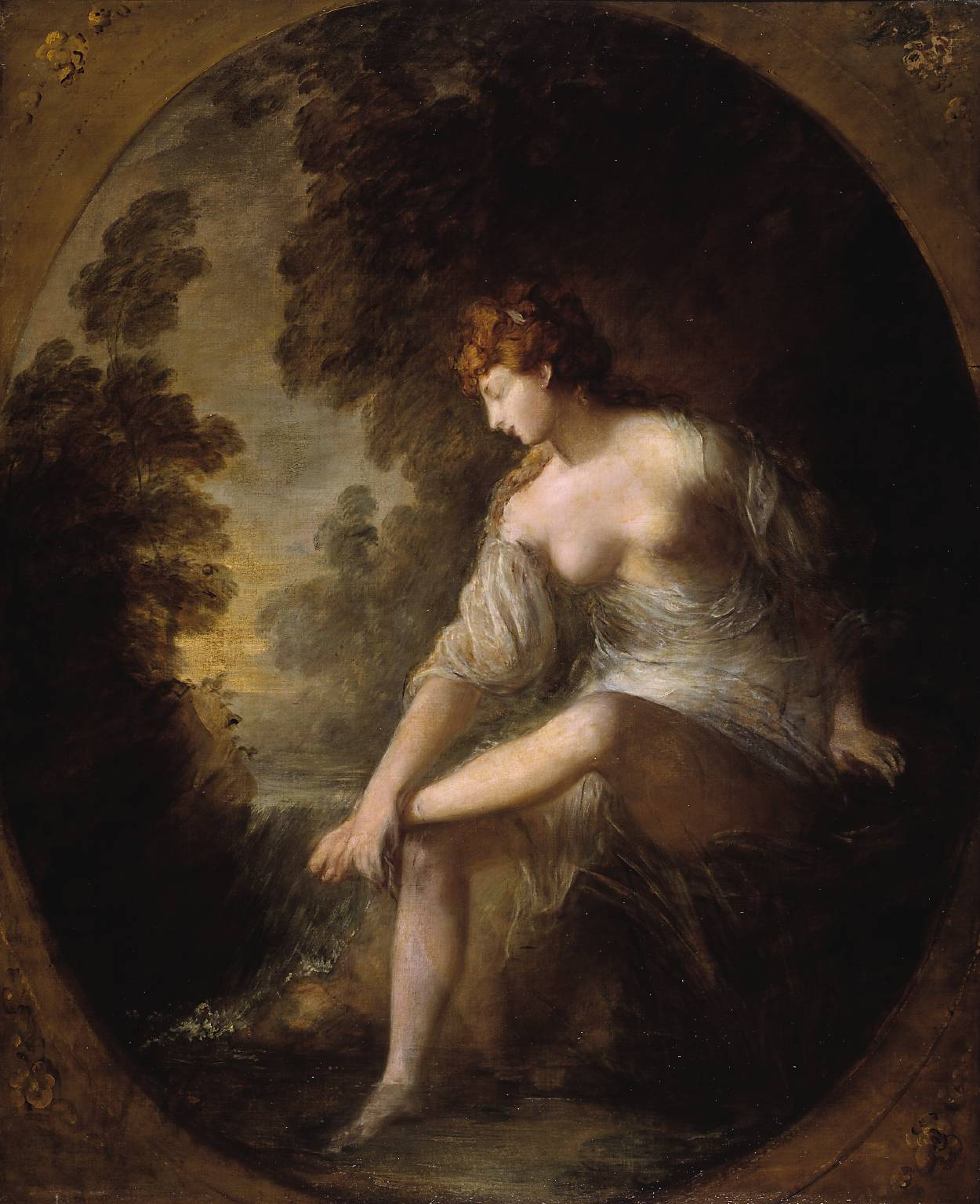
Musidora by Thomas Gainsborough c. 1780–1788. This painting was not exhibited during Gainsborough's lifetime.

As a nude scene from a major and well-respected work of English literature, the theme of Musidora was one of the few pretexts under which mainstream English painters felt able to paint nudes, and Musidora has been described as "the nation's surrogate Venus". Four versions of Musidora attributed to Etty exist in total, the first of which was exhibited at the Royal Academy Summer Exhibition in 1843. The best-known version is that now in Tate Britain, painted in 1844 and probably first exhibited at the British Institution in 1846. The four paintings are identical in composition, although the landscape background varies slightly. One of the paintings is of poorer quality and may be a later copy by a student.

== Composition ==
The painting shows the moment from Summer in which Musidora, having removed the last of her clothes, steps into "the lucid coolness of the flood" to "bathe her fervent limbs in the refreshing stream". Damon is not shown; instead, Etty illustrates the scene from Damon's viewpoint. By placing the audience in Damon's position, Etty aimed to induce the same reactions in the viewer as Damon's dilemma as described by Thomson; that of whether to enjoy the spectacle despite knowing it to be inappropriate, or to follow the accepted morality of the time and look away, in what art historian Sarah Burnage has described as "a titillating moral test for spectators to both enjoy and overcome."

The pose of Musidora is based on that of the Aphrodite of Cnidus and the Venus de' Medici. It is possible that Etty was also familiar with Thomas Gainsborough's Musidora, which shares similar elements. Gainsborough's Musidora, his only large nude, was never exhibited in his lifetime and remained in private hands until 1847, but Etty was familiar with its then-owner Robert Vernon and may have seen it in his collection.

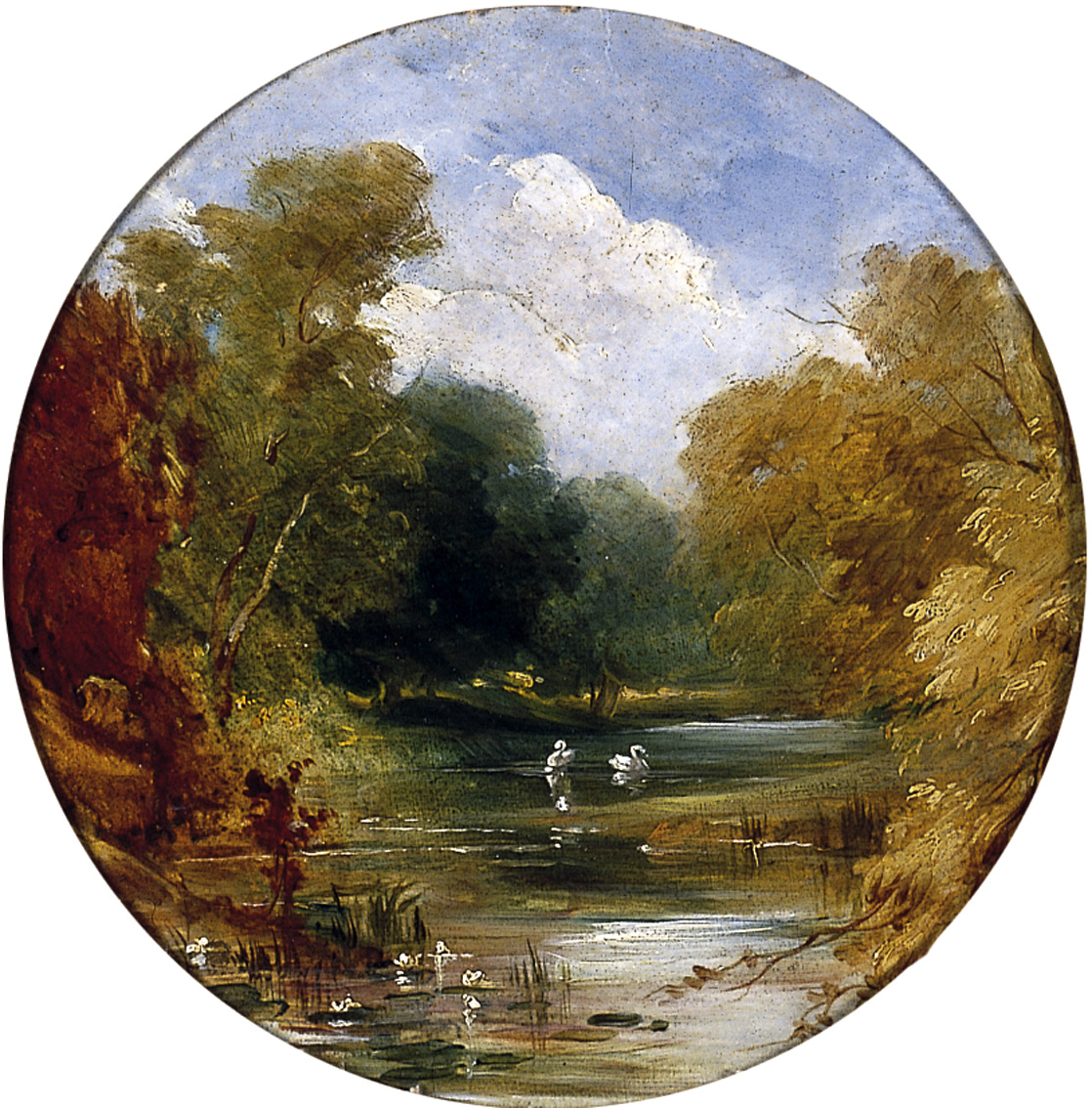
The Plantation at Acomb, William Etty, 1842

The setting for the painting is a pool in the grounds of The Plantation, a house in the village of Acomb, near York. The Plantation was the home of his close friend and patron the Reverend Isaac Spencer, vicar of Acomb, and its grounds being a scene Etty had previously painted. In 1846 Etty bought a house in York for his retirement; Burnage speculates that Etty chose Acomb on the grounds that a view of York was quintessentially English.

Although Etty had traditionally worked in the Venetian style of painting, with rich colours and detail, for Musidora he adopted a much softer and earthier palette, although his use of reflected light on flesh is derived from Venetian styles. He moved away from Rubens, who up to this time had been his greatest influence, and closer to the style of Titian. This is likely owing to the nature of the subject matter. Until then his history paintings had primarily been of subjects from classical mythology and took place in brightly lit Mediterranean settings. The Seasons, by contrast, was seen as an explicitly English work, requiring a more muted palette to deal with the typical lighting conditions of Yorkshire.

== Reception ==
Both exhibited versions met with great acclaim, and Musidora was Etty's most successful painting of a single nude figure. The Court Magazine and Monthly Critic called the 1843 version "One of the most delicate and beautiful female figures in the entire gallery", saying that "no hues can be more natural—more Titianesque, if we may so speak." The Literary Gazette called the version exhibited in 1846 "by far his finest work of art", comparing the piece favourably to Rembrandt and particularly praising Etty's ability to capture shadows and reflections in water, where "in the management of these effects [reflections and shadows] Etty has no superior, and very few equals, in any school, from the earliest dawn of art". The Critic described it as "a preeminent work" and "the triumph of the British school."

Leonard Robinson argues that the popularity of Musidora reflects a change in art buyers. As the Industrial Revolution took hold, the primary market for art was no longer a privately educated landed aristocracy who had been taught the Greek and Latin classics and were familiar with ancient mythology, but the emerging middle class. These new buyers lacked the classical education to understand the references in history paintings but could appreciate Musidora as a skilful execution and as a work of beauty in its own right.

== Legacy ==
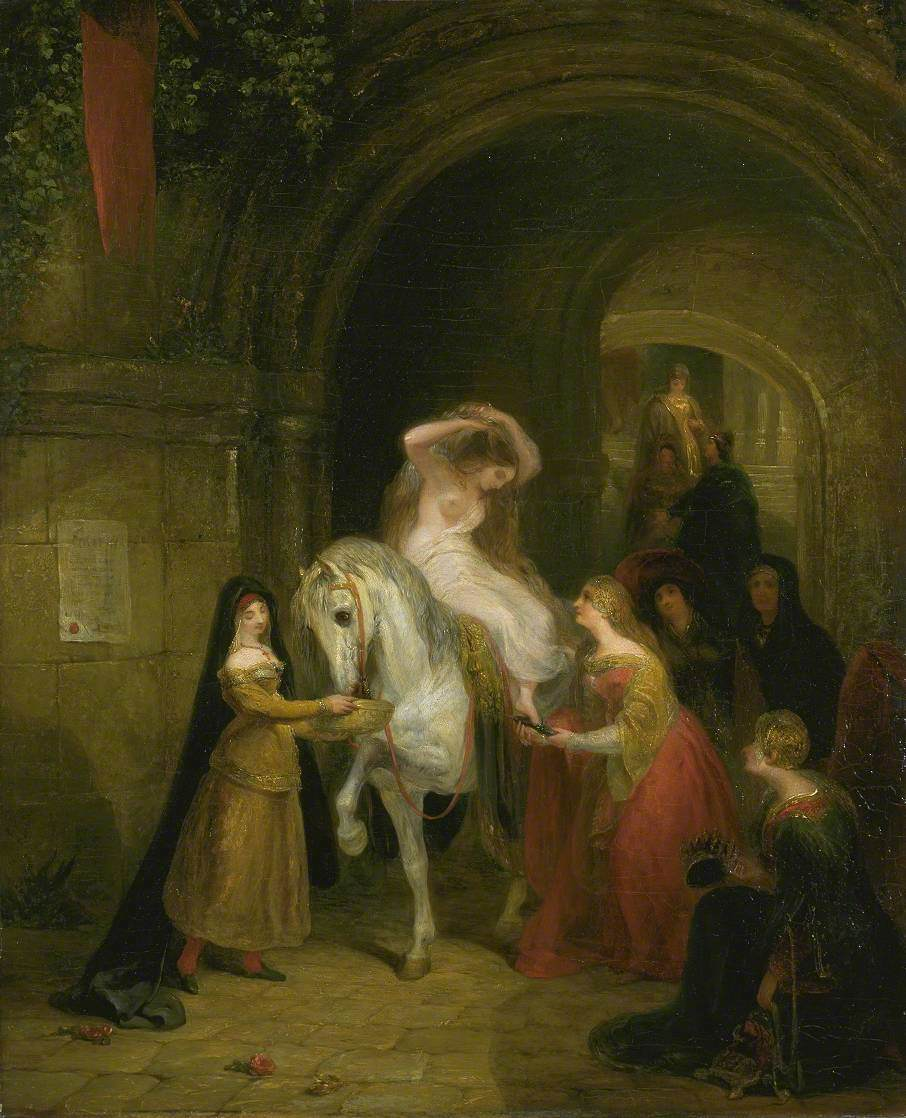
Godiva Preparing to Ride through Coventry, George Jones, 1833

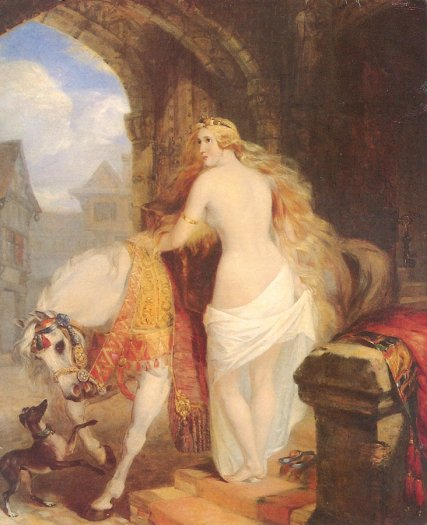
Lady Godiva, Marshall Claxton, 1850

By the time of Musidora, Godiva was replacing Musidora as a pretext for English artists to paint nudes.

By the time Etty exhibited Musidora, the theme was becoming something of a cliché, so that by 1850 it was described by The Literary Gazette as "a favourite subject for a dip of the brush". As interest in studies of Musidora waned, its role as a pretext for nude paintings by English artists was replaced by Lady Godiva, who had become a topic of increased interest owing to Alfred, Lord Tennyson's poem "Godiva". After the death of William Wordsworth in 1850, James Thomson ceased to be a major influence on writers. From the 1870s his popularity with readers waned, and by the end of the 20th century his works other than Rule, Britannia! were little known.

When Etty died in 1849, despite having worked and exhibited until his death, he was still regarded by many as a pornographer. Charles Robert Leslie observed shortly after Etty's death that "[Etty] himself, thinking and meaning no evil, was not aware of the manner in which his works were regarded by grosser minds". Interest in him declined as new movements came to characterise painting in Britain, and by the end of the 19th century the value of his paintings had fallen.

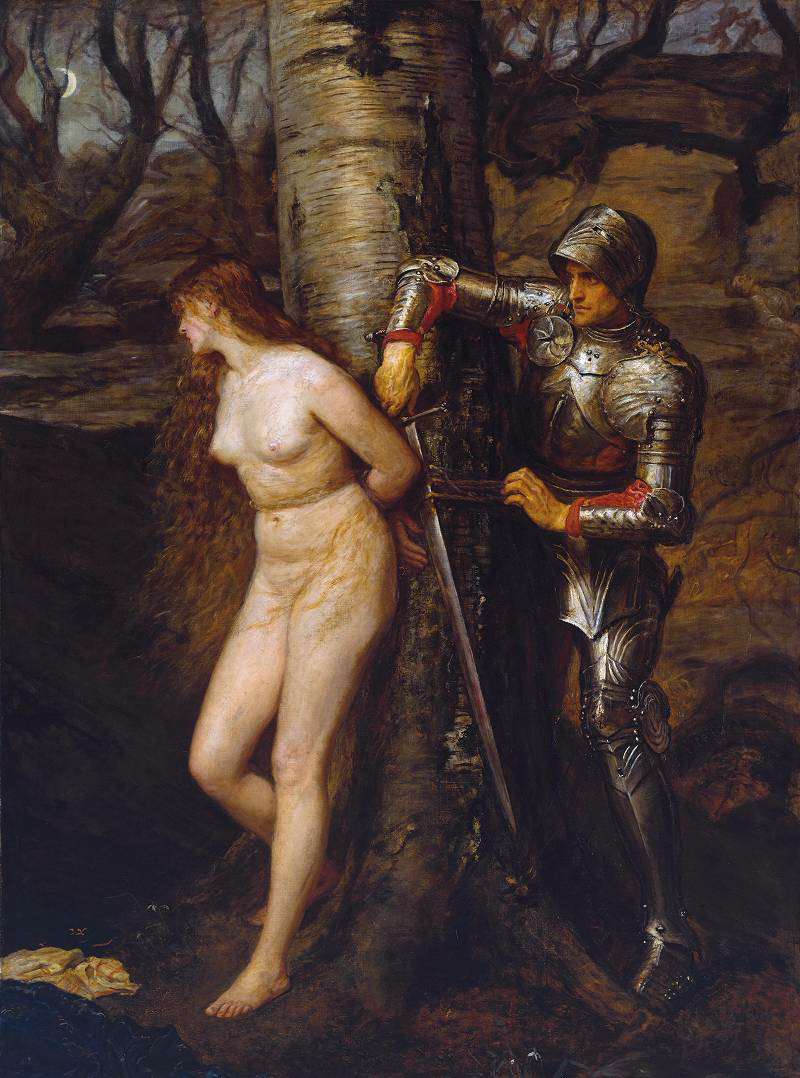
It is likely that the composition of Millais's 1870 The Knight Errant was influenced by Musidora.

It is likely that the composition and style of John Everett Millais's controversial The Knight Errant was influenced by Musidora, but other than Millais, and Etty's admirer and imitator William Edward Frost, few other artists were directly influenced by Etty's work. In 1882 Vanity Fair commented on Musidora that "I know only too well how the rough and his female companion behave in front of pictures such as Etty's bather. I have seen the gangs of workmen strolling round, and I know that their artistic interest in studies of the nude is emphatically embarrassing." By the early 20th century Victorian styles of art and literature fell dramatically out of fashion in Britain, and by 1915 the word "Victorian" had become a derogatory term. Frederick Mentone's The Human Form in Art (1944) was one of the few 20th-century academic works to favourably view Musidora.

=== Versions ===
The 1843 Musidora was bought directly from Etty by City of London merchant George Knott for 70 guineas (about £7,700 in today's terms) who sold it on two years later for 225 guineas (about £24,000 today). It has passed through the hands of a number of private collectors since, remaining in private collections until at least 1948. (Note: The 1843 version was bought by Thomas Agnew & Sons in November 1947 for 60 guineas from an anonymous seller, and was sold to a Mrs Dunne the following year for an undisclosed sum. No full inventory of Etty's works has been conducted since 1958, and the current whereabouts of this version is not recorded.) As well as its 1843 exhibition at the Royal Academy, it was exhibited at an 1849 retrospective of Etty's work at the Society of Arts, and at the Royal Academy's 1889 Old Masters exhibition.

It is not clear which Musidora was exhibited at the British Institution in 1846. The Tate Britain version was bought from Etty for an unknown sum by Jacob Bell. It was exhibited in Etty's 1849 Society of Arts retrospective but was described as "not previously exhibited". It was bequeathed to the National Gallery by Jacob Bell in 1859, and transferred to the Tate Gallery (now Tate Britain) in 1900. In 2001–02 this painting was shown as part of Tate Britain's Exposed: The Victorian Nude exhibition, and exhibited in 2011–12 as part of a major retrospective of Etty's work at the York Art Gallery.

An almost identical version, which is possibly that originally exhibited in 1846, was bequeathed in 1917 to the Manchester Art Gallery, where as of 2025 it remains. Another version, again almost identical to the Tate and Manchester paintings, is in a private collection; it is of poorer quality and is possibly a copy by a 19th-century student.
