= Britomart Delivering Amoretta from the Enchantment of Busirane =

1824 painting by Henry Fuseli

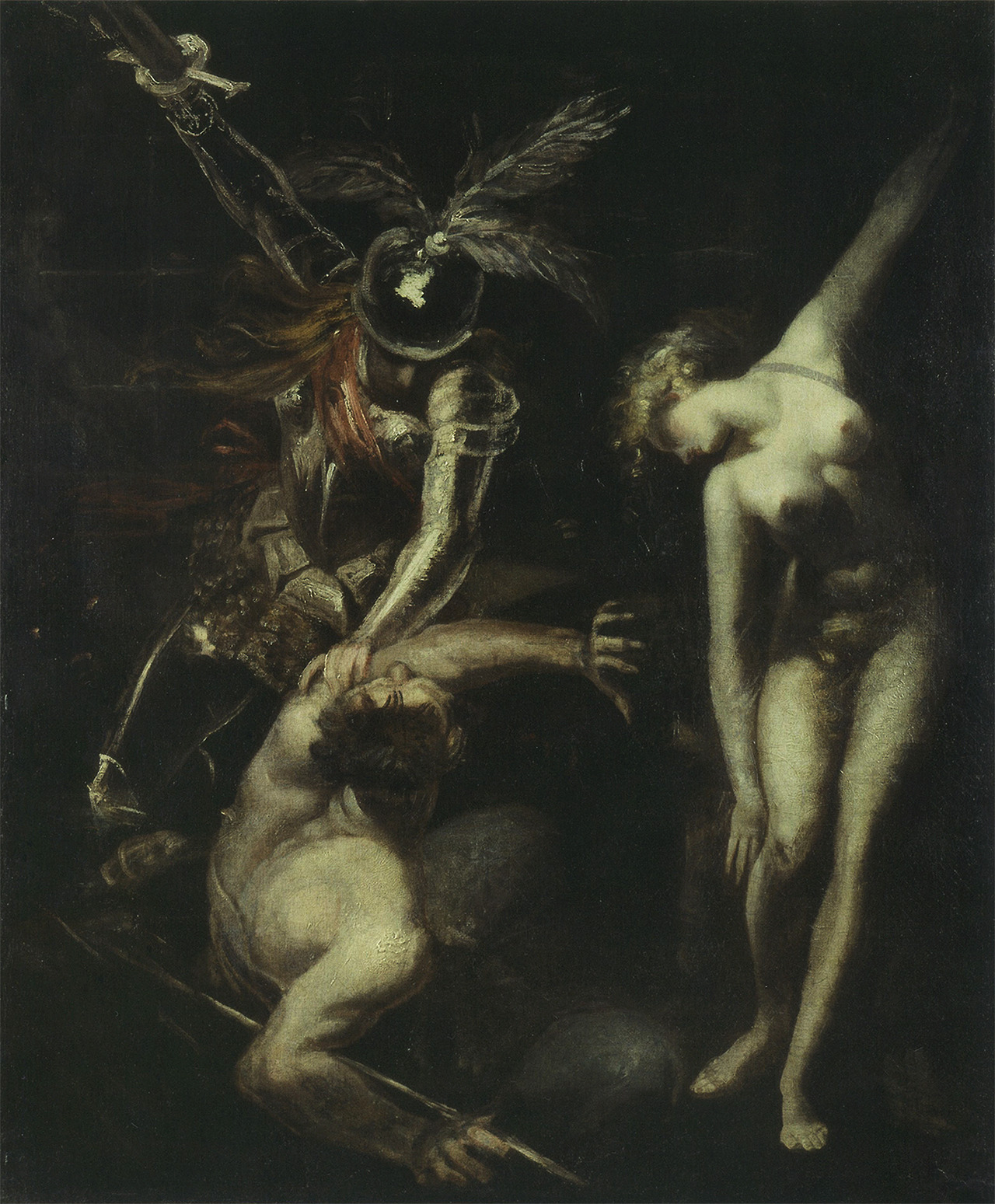
- Artist: Henry Fuseli
- Year: 1824
- Medium: Oil on canvas
- Dimensions: 183.5 cm × 153 cm (72.2 in × 60 in)
- Location: Freies Deutsches Hochstift, Frankfurt

Britomart Delivering Amoretta from the Enchantment of Busirane is an 1824 oil on canvas painting by Swiss painter Henry Fuseli. It has been held at the Freies Deutsches Hochstift in Frankfurt since 1957.

== Description ==
The painting depicts a scene from Edmund Spenser's epic poem The Faerie Queene, in which the female knight Britomart frees Amoretta, a beautiful woman, from her captivity at the hands of Busirane, an evil sorcerer. In Fuseli's painting, Britomart is swinging her sword as if about to kill Busirane. In the poem, however, Amoretta stops Britomart from slaying the sorcerer, as he is the only one who can break the magic which is holding her captive.

== See also ==
- Britomart Redeems Faire Amoret, an 1833 painting by William Etty depicting the same scene

== Sources ==
- Perels, Christoph (1994). "Das Frankfurter Goethe-Museum. Vom Gedenkzimmer zur Galerei der Goethezeit". Das Frankfurter Goethe-Museum zu Gast im Städel (in German). Mainz: Verlag Hermann Schmidt. pp. 8–17. ISBN 3-87439-311-9.
- "Katalogtexte". Füssli - Drama und Theater (in German). Italy: Prestel. 2018. ISBN 978-3-7913-5757-7.
