= The Martyr of the Solway =

Painting by John Everett Millais

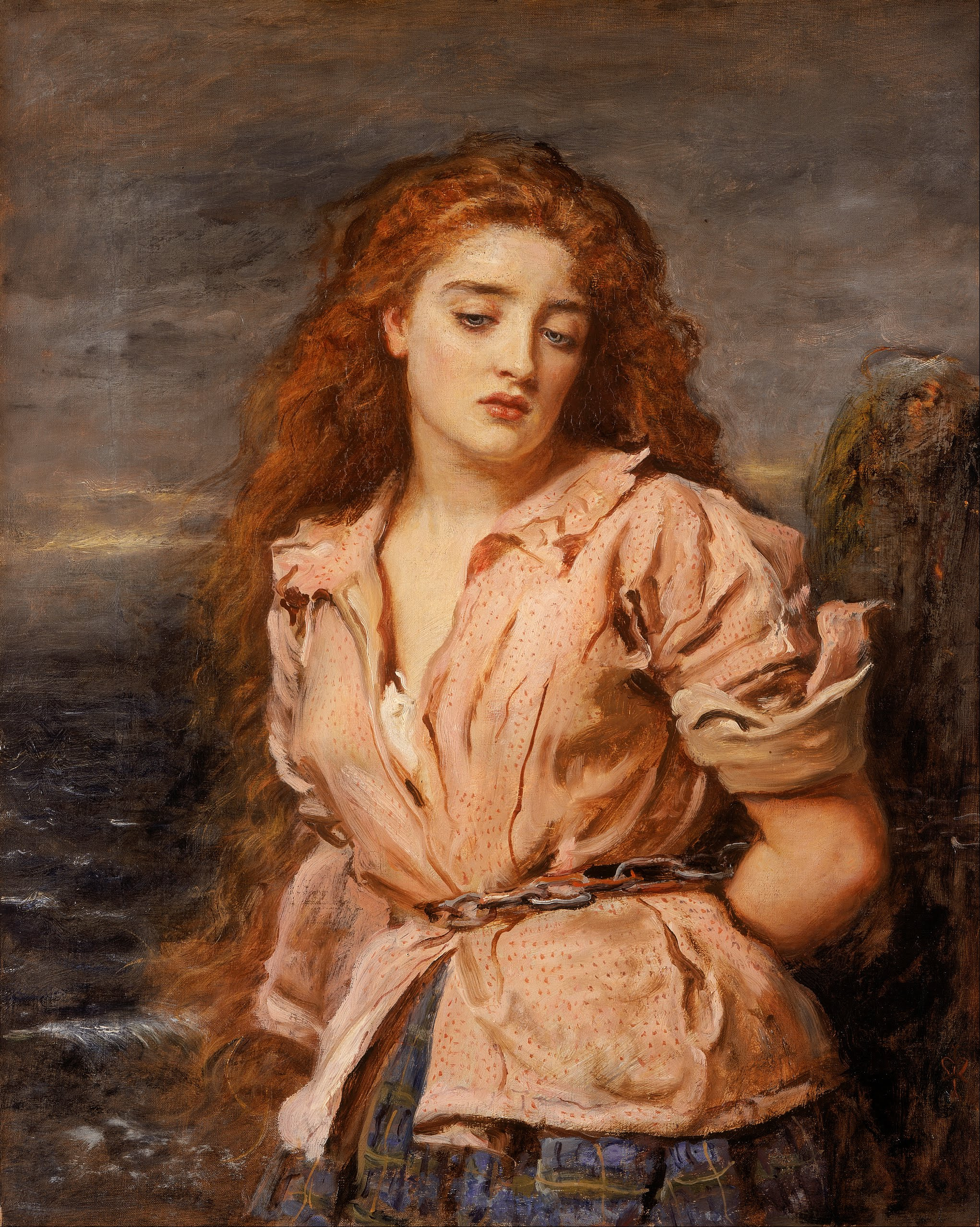
- Artist: John Everett Millais
- Year: 1871
- Type: Oil on canvas, history painting
- Dimensions: 70.5 cm × 56.5 cm (27.8 in × 22.2 in)
- Location: Walker Art Gallery, Liverpool

The Martyr of the Solway is an 1871 history painting by the British artist John Everett Millais. It depicts the Scottish martyr Margaret Wilson. A supporter of the Presbyterian Covenanter movement, she was tied to a stake and drowned in the Solway Firth when she refused to renounce the movement during the Restoration era.

The previous year Millais has displayed a rare nude painting The Knight Errant. Concerned that her direct gaze lacked modesty he stitched out the canvas featuring her head and replaced it with her looking away in shame. Millais then reused the head for this painting.

Today the picture is in the collection of the Walker Art Gallery in Liverpool, having been acquired in 1895.

== See also ==
- List of paintings by John Everett Millais

== Bibliography ==
- Barlow, Paul. Time Present and Time Past: The Art of John Everett Millais. Routledge, 2017.
- Smith, Alison. The Victorian Nude: Sexuality, Morality and Art. Manchester University Press, 1996.
