= The Seasons (Thomson) =

1730 series of poems by James Thomson

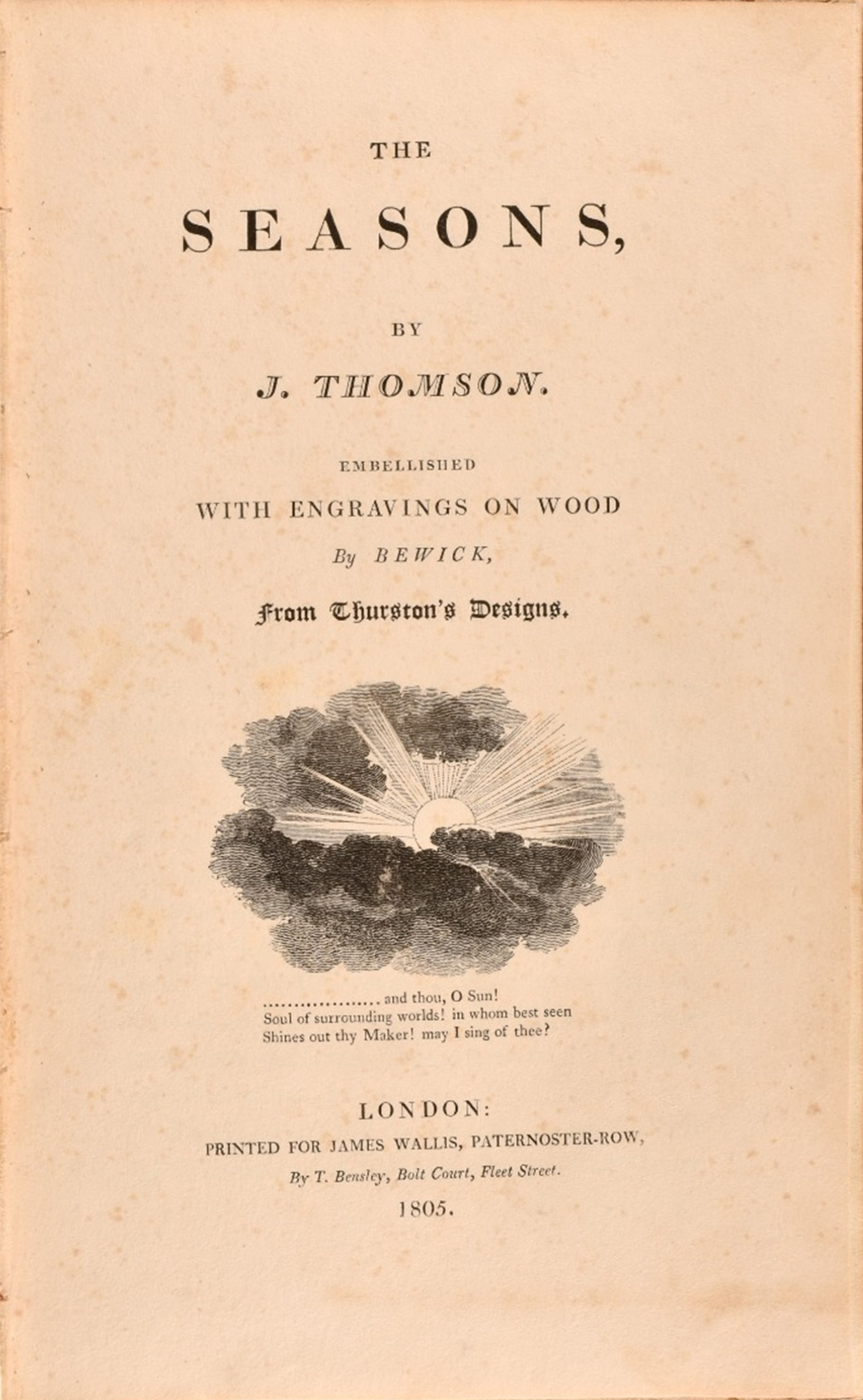
- Title page of 1805 edition
- Author: James Thomson
- Original title: The Seasons
- Language: English
- Genre: Blank verse
- Publication date: 1730
- Publication place: Scotland
- Media type: Print
- Text: The Seasons at Wikisource

The Seasons is a series of four poems written by the Scottish author James Thomson. The first part, Winter, was published in 1726, and the completed poem cycle appeared in 1730.

The poem was extremely influential, and stimulated works by Joshua Reynolds, John Christopher Smith, Joseph Haydn, Thomas Gainsborough and J. M. W. Turner.

The Seasons is also mentioned by Emily Dickinson in poem 131, "Besides the Autumn poets sing".

== Context ==
Thomson was educated first at the Parish school of Southdean then at Jedburgh Grammar School and Edinburgh University where he was a member of "The Grotesques" literary club; some of his early poems were published in the Edinburgh Miscellany of 1720. Seeking a larger stage, he went to London in 1725, and became the tutor of Thomas Hamilton (who became the 7th Earl of Haddington) in Barnet. There he was able to begin Winter, the first of his four Seasons.

Blank verse had been considered more of an interesting toy than anything useful to poetry, despite John Milton's epic-scale Paradise Lost and Paradise Regained half a century earlier.

== Poem ==
The poem was published one season at a time, Winter in 1726, Summer in 1727, Spring in 1728 and Autumn only in the complete edition of 1730. Thomson borrowed Milton's Latin-influenced vocabulary and inverted word order, with phrases like "in convolution swift". He extended Milton's narrative use of blank verse to use it for description and to give a meditative feeling. The critic Raymond Dexter Havens called Thomson's style pompous and contorted, remarking that Thomson seemed to have avoided "calling things by their right names and speaking simply, directly, and naturally".

== Influence ==
The lengthy blank verse poem, reflecting on the landscape of the countryside, was highly influential and much liked for at least a century after its writing. Especially lavish editions were produced between 1830 and 1870 in Britain and America.

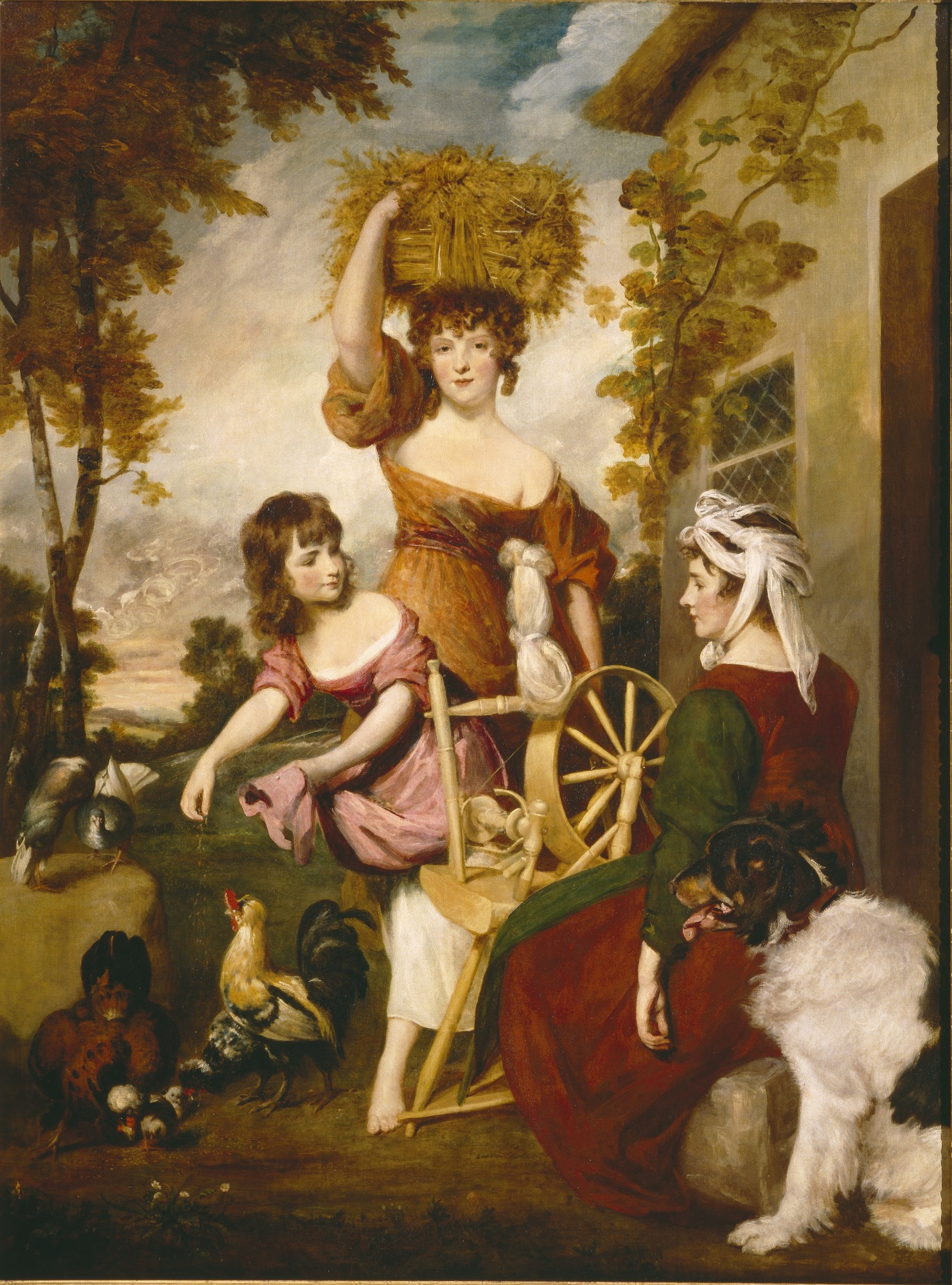
The Cottagers by Joshua Reynolds based on Thomson's "Autumn" poem

A dispute over the publishing rights to The Seasons gave rise to two important legal decisions (Millar v. Taylor; Donaldson v. Beckett) in the history of copyright. In 1750, the London bookseller Andrew Millar reprinted the 1746 edition of The Works of James Thomson vol. 1. and included a prefatory note that emphasised the author's preference for the 1746 edition. Millar may have referred to the 1744 edition because it was the first expanded version of Thomson's famous poem, it sold quickly, and it may have helped to clarify for Millar that he owned the highly valuable copyright of this book in perpetuity. Thomas Macklin included an extract from Autumn in his Poet's Gallery. The painting which used his wife, daughter and Jane Potts as models was created by Joshua Reynolds and then it was engraved and prints were sold.

The Seasons was translated into German by Barthold Heinrich Brockes (1745). This translation formed the basis for a work with the same title by Gottfried van Swieten, which became the libretto for Haydn's oratorio The Seasons. The oratorio was composed between 1799 and 1801 and would premiere in Vienna later that year. Here, Haydn depicts rural life and the changing natural world throughout the year. He incorporates scenes of agricultural labor, hunting, harvest celebrations, a storm and other aspects of rural life. It was one of the composers last major works.

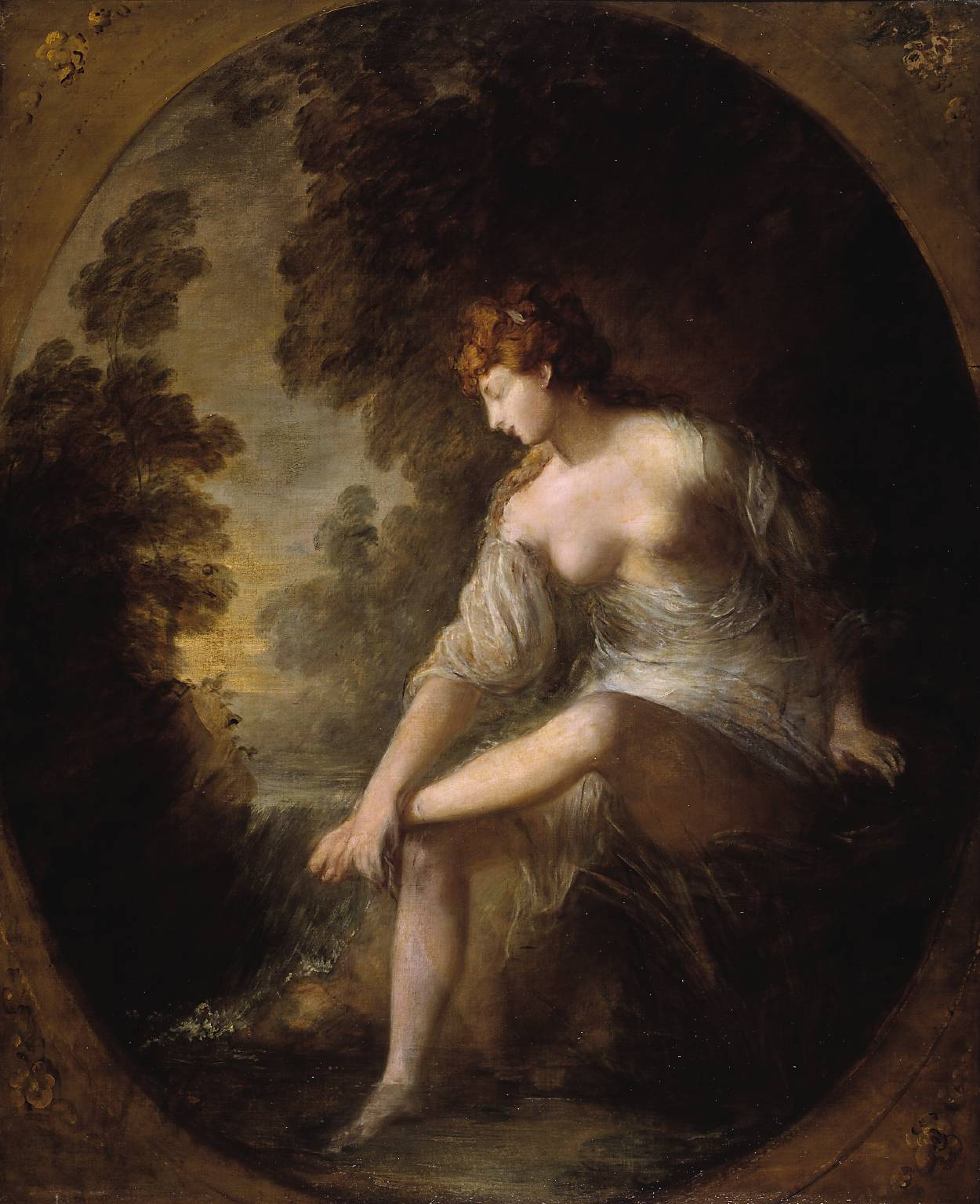
Musidora by Thomas Gainsborough

Artists such as Thomas Medland, Anker Smith and John Neagle (1792) created engravings to accompany the poems. A bathing scene from Summer inspired paintings by Thomas Gainsborough (Musidora), Benjamin West (Musidora and Her Two Companions), William Etty (Musidora: The Bather 'At the Doubtful Breeze Alarmed'), Arthur Hughes (Musidora Bathing) and Johann Sebastian Bach the Younger.

The piece was translated into French by the naturalist Joseph-Philippe-François Deleuze (1753–1835).

Oscar Wilde included this poem, only half-sarcastically, in a list of ‘books not to read at all’.

== Sources ==
- Sambrook, James. "Thomson, James (1700–1748)", Oxford Dictionary of National Biography, Oxford University Press, 2004.
