= Musidora (Gainsborough) =

Painting by Thomas Gainsborough

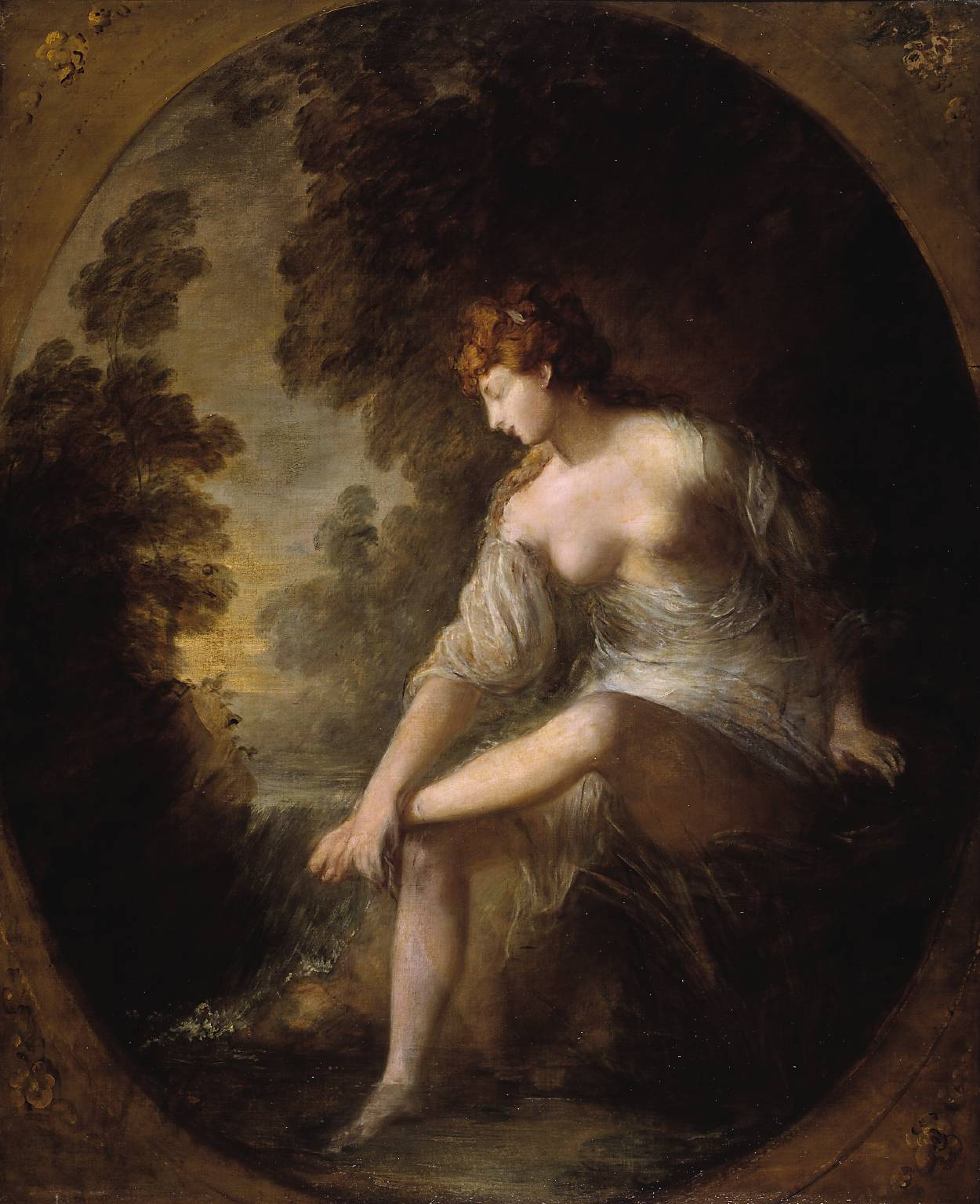
- Artist: Thomas Gainsborough
- Year: c. 1780–1788
- Type: Oil on canvas
- Dimensions: 188 cm × 153 cm (74 in × 60 in)
- Location: Tate Britain, London

Musidora is an oil on canvas painting by the English artist Thomas Gainsborough, from c. 1780–1788. It depicts a scene from the 1727 poem Summer by the Scottish writer James Thomson, part of his larger work The Seasons.

After relocating from Bath to London, Gainsborough established himself as a leading painter of high society portrait paintings while also producing notable landscapes. The painting is his only known nude. Although there is no solid evidence, it has traditionally been believed that it was produced for Thomas Macklin's Poet Gallery. The painting remained unfinished at the artist's death. It later came into the collection of the art collector Robert Vernon who donated it to the nation in 1847 as part of the Vernon Gift. Today it is in the Tate Britain, in London.

== See also ==
- Musidora: The Bather 'At the Doubtful Breeze Alarmed', nineteenth century paintings of the same subject by William Etty

== Bibliography ==
- Bermingham, Ann. Landscape and Ideology: The English Rustic Tradition, 1740-1860. University of California Press,1986.
- Hamilton, James. Gainsborough: A Portrait. Hachette UK, 2017.
- Robinson, Leonard. William Etty: The Life and Art. McFarland, 2007.
