= The Knight Errant (painting) =

1870 painting by John Everett Millais

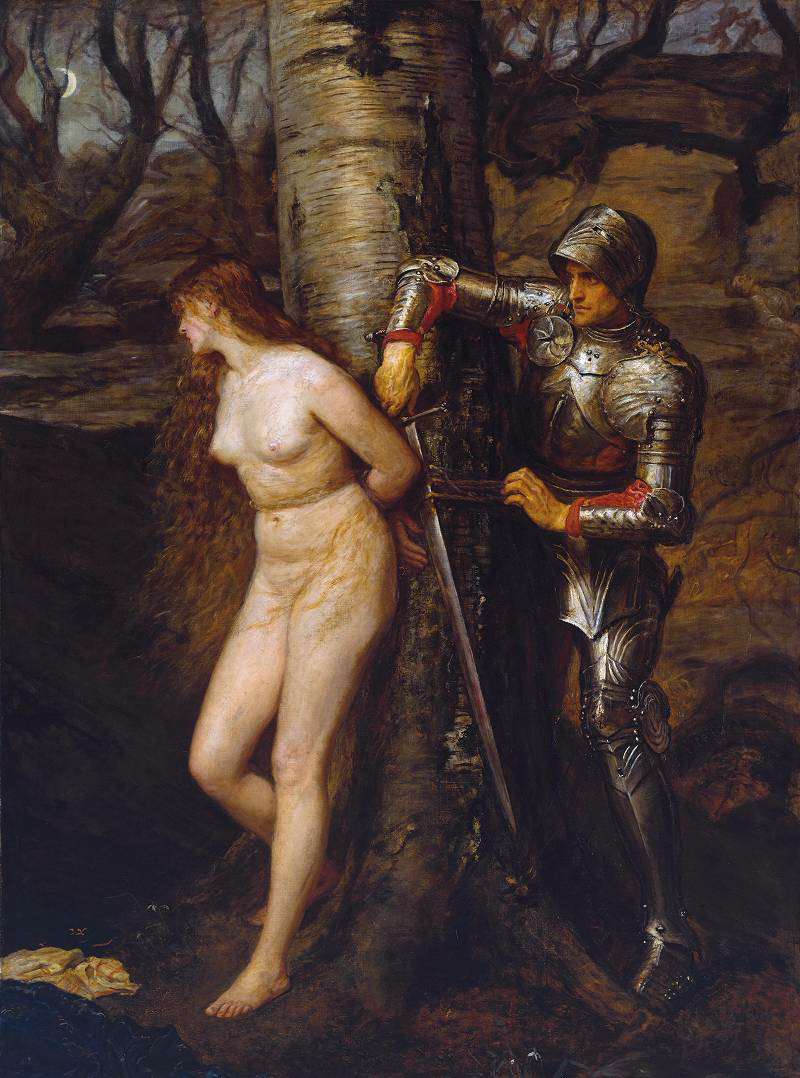
- Artist: John Everett Millais
- Year: 1870
- Type: Oil on canvas, genre painting
- Dimensions: 184.1 cm × 135.3 cm (72.5 in × 53.3 in)
- Location: Tate Britain, London

The Knight Errant is an oil painting on canvas by the British artist John Everett Millais, from 1870. It features a young nude woman tied to a tree, being rescued by a knight in shining armour. He has driven off her attackers, who are shown either dead or fleeing in the background. The scene takes place at some point in the medieval era but its context is deliberately unclear. Intended as a celebration of chivalry, although not based on specific literary work, several reviews described it as "Spenserian".

Although nude paintings had been produced in rising numbers in recent years Millais was not known for his nude works. Rather than the fashionable classical style of Frederic Leighton, the robust style of the female nude harked back to the paintings of William Etty of whom Millais had been an admirer before he became involved in the Pre-Raphaelite Brotherhood.

Initially the face of the woman was directed towards the viewer but Millais believed it would improve the work if she was shown in a more modest stance and painted her looking away. He reused the original head for another of his paintings The Martyr of the Solway (1871).

The picture was displayed at the Royal Academy Exhibition of 1870 held at Burlington House in Piccadilly. It was also featured at the 1871 International Exhibition at South Kensington. Today the painting is in the collection of the Tate Britain, having been given by Henry Tate in 1894.

== See also ==
- List of paintings by John Everett Millais

== Bibliography ==
- Barlow, Paul (2017). Time Present and Time Past: The Art of John Everett Millais. Routledge.
- Matthews, David (2011). Medievalism: A Critical History. D.S. Brewer.
- Smith, Alison (1996). The Victorian Nude: Sexuality, Morality and Art. Manchester University Press.
