= Posthumous Poems =

Poetry collection by Percy Bysshe Shelley

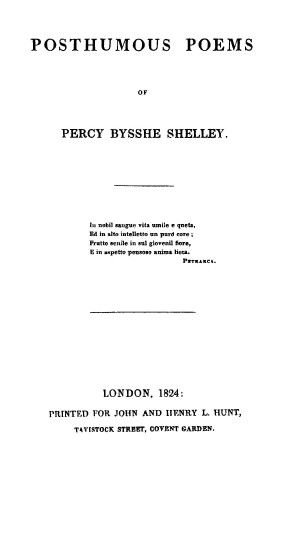
- Title page
- Author: Percy Bysshe Shelley
- Language: English
- Genre: Poetry
- Published: London: C. H. Reynell for John and Henry L. Hunt, 1824
- Publisher: John and Henry L. Hunt
- Publication date: 1824
- Publication place: UK
- Pages: 415

Posthumous Poems is a collection of poems by Percy Bysshe Shelley, with a preface by his widow Mary Shelley, which was published in 1824 in London by John and Henry L. Hunt.

== Publication ==
Ruth S. Granniss makes the following statement about the circumstances of the publication: "It was with difficulty that a publisher was found for the book, the sale of two hundred and fifty copies being guaranteed by Thomas Lovell Beddoes, Bryan Waller Proctor ("Barry Cornwall") and Thomas Forbes Felsall. ["Felsall" is a typographical error for "Kelsall".] The original intention to include certain prose pieces was abandoned on account of the size of the volume."

== Contents ==
The collection begins with a preface by Mary Shelley written in London on June 1, 1824. The first poems selected are unpublished posthumous poems. Poems are also listed under "Miscellaneous Poems", "Fragments", and "Translations". The newly published poems are The Witch of Atlas, Julian and Maddalo, and The Triumph of Life. Shelley's previously published poem is also included: Mont Blanc from History of a Six Weeks' Tour (1817) and a different poem with the same title Mutability as the one from Frankenstein (1818) and Alastor (1816).

The poems contained in the collection include:

- Love's Philosophy
- The Witch of Atlas
- Julian and Maddalo
- A Dirge
- One Word is Too Often Profaned
- The Triumph of Life
- Music, When Soft Voices Die
- Prince Athanase
- Prince Athanase, Part II
- Mont Blanc
- Mutability (1821-1822 poem)

Shelley's final unfinished verse dramas are also included:

- Charles the First (Percy Bysshe Shelley play), on the period before the English Civil Wars and the conflict with Parliament
- Fragments from an Unfinished Drama, about an Enchantress on an Indian Archipelago island who rescues a Pirate, falls in love with him, and uses supernatural powers to bring him back after he departs for his mortal love.

== Sources ==
- Granniss, Ruth S. (1923). A descriptive catalogue of the first editions in book form of the writings of Percy Bysshe Shelley, based on a memorial exhibition held at The Grolier Club from April 20, to May 20, 1922. New York: The Grolier Club. pp. 78–81.
- Shelley, Percy Bysshe (1824). Shelley, Mary (ed.). Posthumous Poems. London: C. H. Reynell for John and Henry L. Hunt.
- Wilson, Patrick J. "Shelley's Posthumous Ditty". International Journal of English Literature and Social Sciences (IJELS), Vol-4, Issue-3, May-June, 2019. Retrieved 19 January 2025
