= Charles the First (Shelley play) =

Poetry collection by Percy Bysshe Shelley

Posthumous Poems
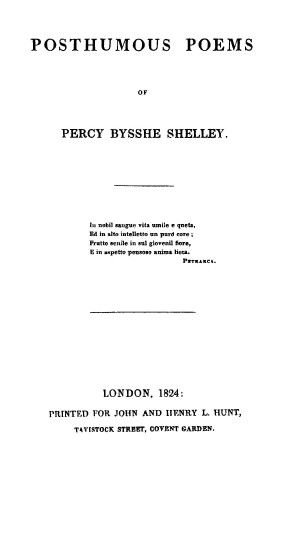
- Title page
- Author: Percy Bysshe Shelley
- Language: English
- Genre: Poetry
- Published: London: C. H. Reynell for John and Henry L. Hunt, 1824
- Publisher: John and Henry L. Hunt
- Publication date: 1824
- Publication place: UK
- Pages: 415

Charles the First is an unfinished historical verse drama by Percy Bysshe Shelley written in 1822. It focuses on the tyrannical rule of King Charles I of England, his conflict with Parliament, and the events leading to the English Civil War. It was originally published in 1824 in Posthumous Poems in London by John and Henry L. Hunt but only in brief fragments. In later publications, more content was added.

Shelley portrays the King as an absolute monarch, clinging to power, while portraying the rebels or revolutionaries as flawed, highlighting the struggle for liberty against religious and political oppression.

== Background ==
The key themes are tyranny and resistance. The play examines the conflict between a "stubborn" king relying on his divine right to rule and the popular movement against his arbitrary taxation and oppressive policies.

Shelley focuses on King Charles I of England, Queen Henrietta, William Laud, the Archbishop of Canterbury, and Thomas Wentworth, 1st Earl of Strafford, portrayed as a villainous "apostate" who aids and abets the monarch’s oppressive regime.

The revolution or rebellion was imperfect, however, because both sides were imbued with selfishness and badly executed ideals.

It was written in 1822 during a period when Shelley sought to highlight parallels between prior English history and contemporary political conflicts over the monarchy and arbitrary rule.

The work is referred to as a "fragmentary drama", a "closet drama", a "historical drama," and an "unfinished tragedy". Shelley postponed work on the play to focus on The Triumph of Life.

Like in The Cenci and Julian and Maddalo, it demonstrates Shelley's ability to create nuanced dramatic characters.

It examines the persecutions of that time, "martyred saints" and religious conflict, showing the political chaos and turmoil of 17th-century Britain.

The dichotomy is between tyranny and freedom: Shelley examines the moral collapse of a monarch and despot who tramples the rights and liberties of the people, similar to themes in his other political works such as The Revolt of Islam (1817), The Cenci (1819), The Mask of Anarchy (1819), "Song to the Men of England" (1819), "England in 1819", and Oedipus Tyrannus; or, Swellfoot the Tyrant (1820).

It dramatizes the conflicts leading up to the English Civil War, focusing on the tension between the king and Parliament, while portraying the rebels as internally divided and ambitious.

The play draws historical parallels between the English Civil War and the French Revolution, showing the pitfalls of reform movements and the dangers of extreme political change.

He emphasized the "abortive" nature of the rebellion, achieving a revolution for which the people are not fully prepared or ready for.

Shelley intended the play for the stage, like with The Cenci, but temporarily suspended work on it because he found it difficult to fully realize the "severe and high feelings" he wanted to dramatize: "One can see that Charles the First was intended for the stage from the first scene." Shelley informed Edward John Trelawny that "I am now writing a play for the stage. It is affectation to say we write a play for any other purpose. The subject is from English history".

The dramatic scenes focus primarily on the conflict between King Charles the First with Parliament and the rising power of Puritan reformers.

== Publication history ==
The play was left unfinished in 1822 on Shelley's death. It was first published in 1824 in Posthumous Poems as a fragment of 460 lines, edited and compiled by his wife Mary Shelley. In the 1839 edition, more lines were added to bring the total to 540.

William Michael Rossetti, in his 1870 edition of Shelley's Complete Poetical Works, restored, expanded, and reorganized the poem by transcribing previously unpublished manuscript fragments left out of earlier editions and splicing them into the text to create a significantly larger, comprehensive version of the play. The Rossetti additions brought the total number of lines to 820.

The play appeared in The Complete Poetical Works edited by Thomas Hutchinson in an edition published by Oxford in London in 1914.

== Summary ==
Act 1. Scene 1.

Scene 1 of Percy Bysshe Shelley's unfinished drama Charles the First is set in London during a lavish, royalist Masque at the Inns of Court. It contrasts the King’s opulent and insular court life with the foreboding fears and concerns of ordinary citizens who foresee an impending civil war and bloodshed.

The play opens with a crowd gathered at a Pageant waiting for the arrival of the Queen. They are witnessing a procession coming to a masque. They can hear the music and see the light from the burning torches in the distance. Some spectators support the king while others oppose him. One voices his grievance. He complains that Charles did not help the Huguenots in France: "The remnant of the martyred saints in Rochefort/ Have been abandoned by their faithless allies." (295-294).

A Young Man declares that it is "a happy sight to see,/ Beautiful, innocent, and unforbidden/ By God or man" (317-316) and regards the masque as positive and beneficial. He compares it to a dream:

"'tis like the bright procession
Of skiey visions in a solemn dream
From which men wake as from a Paradise,
And draw new strength to tread the thorns of life."

He tells them to "kill these bitter thoughts which make the present/ Dark as the future!" He warns them not to awaken dormant thoughts:

"When Avarice and Tyranny, vigilant Fear,
And open-eyed Conspiracy lie sleeping
As on Hell's threshold."

A Second Citizen is skeptical due to the corrupt nature of political power: "As adders cast their skins/ And keep their venom, so kings often change;/ Councils and counsellors hang on one another,/ Hiding the loathsome. Like the base patchwork of a leper’s rags." All kings seek power and domination, are oppressive and tyrannical.

The old man makes a prophecy, predicting bloodshed. "Nine years more/ The roots will be refreshed with civil blood." (319-318)

The Second Citizen cautions about the illusion of peace and the changing tides: "The day that dawns in fire will die in storms, even though the noon be calm." He emphasizes the inevitability of historical change: "Canst thou discern/ The signs of seasons, yet perceive no hint/ Of change in that stage-scene in which thou art/ Not a spectator but an actor?" The Young Man, however, is optimistic and believes that "our country’s wounds/ May yet be healed./ The King is just and gracious". He argues for a more hopeful and peaceful outlook, but he has doubts and misgivings: "O still those dissonant thoughts". (pp. 285-284) (309-308)

The Second Citizen asserts that Charles "must decline/ Amid the darkness of conflicting storms/ To dank extinction and to latest night." (pp. 309-308).

After the Pursuivant requests a place for the Marshal of the Masque, the First Citizen asks: "What thinkest thou of this quaint masque/ which turns/ Like morning from the shadow of the night/ The night to day/ And London to a place/ Of peace and joy."

Shelley shows the dichotomy between the extravagance and luxury of those revelers in the masque, the "lilies glorious as Solomon" (pp. 275- 274) and the poverty and decrepitude of the anti-masque participants made up of "cripples beggars and outcasts/ Horsed upon stumbling jades". (pp. 273-272).

The Second Citizen blames Strafford for his pernicious influence on the King: "There goes/ The apostate Strafford" with "whispered aphorisms/ From Machiavel and Bacon", more brazen and bolder than Judas. (pp. 301-300)

Both the priests and the religious dissidents are disparaged: The bishops are likened to "crocodiles" while the Puritans follow a "serpent creed". The Archbishop is likened to the Roman Pontiff:

"Rather say the Pope:
London will be soon his Rome: he walks
As if he trod upon the heads of men."

The fall of Charles is predicted. "This Charles the First/ Rose like the equinoctial sun." Charles is like the sun which will fall as in sunset. The sun rises "engirt by vapours", surrounded by threatening clouds and fog and gives off a "cold glare, intenser than the noon". The metaphor highlights a monarch who has reached his "height of noon" and is destined to decline rapidly into the "darkness of conflicting storms" and "latest night". This description foreshadows the king's fall, trial, and execution.

The citizens prophecy the civil war that they see coming on the horizon because of the widespread abuses and the oppression and persecution of the people by the monarchy. They foresee that the tyranny will result in a violent revolution and a brutal and bloody reaction and reckoning.

Scene 2

The King convenes a council at Whitehall to address the growing political unrest in the country. Amidst rising Puritan rebellion, Charles, Queen Henrietta Maria, Archbishop Laud, and Lord Strafford discuss strategies for securing funds, enforcing royal absolutism, bypassing an uncooperative Parliament, and suppressing dissent.

The Royal Presence: King Charles I enters a chamber in Whitehall surrounded by his advisors and the Queen. His court jester, Archy, is also present and provides sardonic commentary on the folly and supercilious arrogance of the royal court, acting as a critical and detached observer in a room full of sycophants and cronies. His role as a jester providing him a measure of immunity from retaliation and censure.

After King Charles addresses Laud as "My Lord of Canterbury", Archy announces: "The fool is here." Laud demands that he be chastised for his insolence. Charles makes him stand in the rain for ten minutes, commenting ruefully: "He weaves about himself a world of mirth/ Out of the wreck of ours."

The Queen encourages the King to be firm and resolute in confronting opposition:

"I see the new-born courage in your eye
Armed to strike dead the Spirit of the Time,
Which spurs to rage the many-headed beast."

Authoritarian Strategies: The King, in concert with the Queen and Archbishop Laud, bluntly and openly discusses circumventing Parliament and consolidating absolute power. They devise a plan to levy unpopular taxes such as ship money and enact a rigid and strict regimen of religious conformity and uniformity. They dismiss out of hand the grievances of the English people and trample on their rights and freedoms.

Counsel of Tyranny: Archbishop Laud and Lord Strafford actively support the King in his tyrannical and oppressive policies, arguing that it is his royal prerogative and duty under divine right, urging the King to rule with a heavy hand. They dismiss with disdain any concern for the liberties of citizens and religious dissenters such as the Puritans. They put the power of the King and the Church above that of the interests of the people and the public welfare. No compromises or concessions of any kind are allowed.

Strafford advises him to pay off dissenters, keep the opposition disunited, and borrow gold:

"Fee with coin
The loudest murmurers; feed with jealousies
Opposing factions,-- be thyself of none;
And borrow gold of many."

Legal and Civic Dissent: St. John, representing the Gentlemen of the Inns of Court, is present. This highlights the ensuing constitutional crisis as civil dissent grows due to the King's rigid and inflexible position regarding church and state in England. His dictatorial rule creates resistance and opposition.

Laud suggests that Parliament be taught to obey by "strong actions" and "smooth words" and that Scotland must be subdued:

"An army must be sent into the north;
Followed by a Commission of the Church,
With amplest power to quench in fire and blood,
And tears and terror, and the pity of hell."

The scene ends with the King, Queen, and Archy unable to relieve the foreboding sense of disaster and doom.

Scene 3

The scene takes place in the Star Chamber spotlighting the characters Laud, Strafford, Juxon, Bastwick, and Bishop Williams.

Mutilated Witnesses: The scene focuses on the arrival of Leighton and Bastwick, who are victims of the King's tyranny and arbitrary power.

Bastwick's sentence is to pay five thousand pounds, to have both ears cut off, to be branded on the cheek and forehead, and to be imprisoned in Lancaster Castle for a time to be determined.

Citizen Dissent: After Bastwick's defiance and rejection of the sentence, Laud orders that his tongue be slit for insolence.

Juxon, appalled by the extreme and cruel punishments proposed, requests that his hands not be cut off.

Bishop Williams, by contrast, accepts his punishment: "Peace, proud hierarch!/ I know my sentence, and I own it just."

Branded Faces: Leighton reveals that he has been brutally branded and disfigured by the state's enforcers, eliciting outrage and curses from the second and third citizens.

The Call for Resistance: The reaction becomes increasingly extremist and violent with calls to "smite each Bishop under the fifth rib" to root out the corruption and the abuses in the church.

Scene 4

The scene lists John Hampden, John Pym, Oliver Cromwell, his daughter, and Harry Vane as the characters that appear, but only a dialogue between Hampden and Vane is presented.

The Parliamentarian Hampton bids farewell to England in this scene and plans to depart with Pym. They face persecution if they remain.

Hampden: "England, farewell! thou, who hast been my cradle, Shalt never be my dungeon or my grave!"

They observe an impending storm which they compare to the political turmoil which will soon descend on the country.

Vane describes the coming storm:

"The silver lightnings
Of the evening star, spite of the city's smoke,
Tell that the north wind reigns in the upper air.
Mark too that flock of fleecy-wingèd clouds."

Hampden compares the rebels to eaglets in their mountain nests who wait to soar down. The "eagle spirits of the free,/ Return to brood on thoughts that cannot die/ And cannot be repelled."

They decide to resist the tyranny of King Charles and the church vowing to stay to fight on, which leads to the start of the English Civil War.

Scene 5

Archy, the court fool of Charles I, is "both an unacknowledged prophet and, as King Charles claims, a weaver" of "a world of mirth out of the wreck of ours."

He sings the song of the widow bird, perched on a bough in winter, in mourning for her mate. The "frozen" wind and the "freezing" river are described. There are no leaves on the trees and no flowers on the ground. The air is still and there is no sound but that of a mill-wheel.

"A widow bird sate mourning for her love
Upon a wintry bough;
The frozen wind crept on above,
The freezing stream below."

This bleak and foreboding picture foreshadows the brutality and carnage of the civil war which is to come.

"There was no leaf upon the forest bare,
No flower upon the ground,
And little motion in the air
Except the mill-wheel's sound."

== Sources ==
- Cameron, Kenneth Neill. "Shelley's Use of Source Material in Charles I." Modern Language Quarterly 6.2 (1945): 197-210.
- Crook, Nora. "Calumniated Republicans and the Hero of Shelley's 'Charles the First'." Keats-Shelley Journal 56 (2007): 155-172.
- Crook, Nora. "Shelley’s Late Fragmentary Plays: 'Charles the First' and the 'Unfinished Drama'." The Unfamiliar Shelley.
- Havens, Raymond, D. "'Hellas' and 'Charles the First'." Studies in Philology, Vol. 43, No. 3 (July, 1946), pp. 545–550.
- Mulhallen, Jacqueline. The Theatre of Shelley. Routledge, 2016. 297-311. Open Book Publishers. Chapter 4: Chapter Four: Turning History into Art – Charles the First, p. 115-146.
- Shelley, Percy Bysshe. The poetical works of Percy Bysshe Shelley: including various additional pieces from ms. and other sources. The text carefully revised, with notes and a memoir, by William Michael Rossetti. Volume 2. London: Edward Moxon, 1870.
- White, Newman I. "Shelley's 'Charles the First'." The Journal of English and Germanic Philology 21.3 (1922): 431-441.
- Woodings, R. B. "'A devil of a nut to crack:' Shelley's Charles the first." Studia Neophilologica 40.1 (1968): 216-237.
- Woodings, R. B. "Shelley's Widow Bird." The Review of English Studies, Vol. 19, No. 76 (Nov., 1968), pp. 411-414.
- Woodings, R. B. "Shelley's Sources for 'Charles the First'." The Modern Language Review (1969): 267-275.
- Wright, Walter Francis. "Shelley's Failure in Charles I." ELH 8.1 (1941): 41-46.
