= History of a Six Weeks' Tour =

1817 book by Mary and Percy Bysshe Shelley

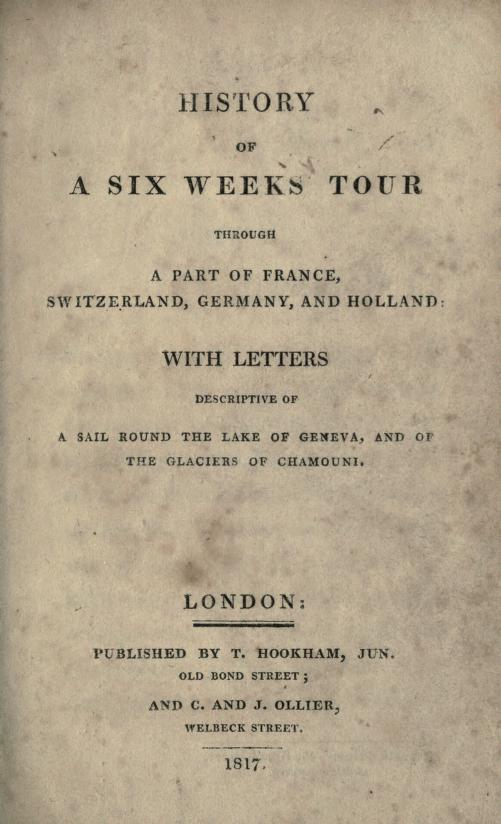
Title page from History of a Six Weeks' Tour (1817), Thomas Hookham, Jr. and Charles and James Ollier, London.

History of a Six Weeks' Tour through a part of France, Switzerland, Germany, and Holland; with Letters Descriptive of a Sail Round the Lake of Geneva and of the Glaciers of Chamouni is a travel narrative by the English Romantic authors Mary Shelley and Percy Bysshe Shelley. Published anonymously in 1817, it describes two trips taken by Mary, Percy, and Mary's stepsister, Claire Clairmont: one across Europe in 1814, and one to Lake Geneva in 1816. Divided into three sections, the text consists of a journal, four letters, and Percy Shelley's poem "Mont Blanc". Apart from the poem, preface, and two letters, the text was primarily written and organised by Mary Shelley. In 1840 she revised the journal and the letters, republishing them in a collection of Percy Shelley's writings.

Part of the new genre of the Romantic travel narrative, History of a Six Weeks' Tour exudes spontaneity and enthusiasm; the authors demonstrate their desire to develop a sense of taste and distinguish themselves from those around them. The romantic elements of the work would have hinted at the text's radical politics to nineteenth-century readers. However, the text's frank discussion of politics, including positive references to the French Revolution and praise of Enlightenment philosopher Jean-Jacques Rousseau, was unusual for a travel narrative at the time, particularly one authored primarily by a woman.

Although it sold poorly, History of a Six Weeks' Tour received favourable reviews. In proposing another travel narrative to her publisher in 1843, Mary Shelley claimed "my 6 weeks tour brought me many compliments".

== Biographical background ==
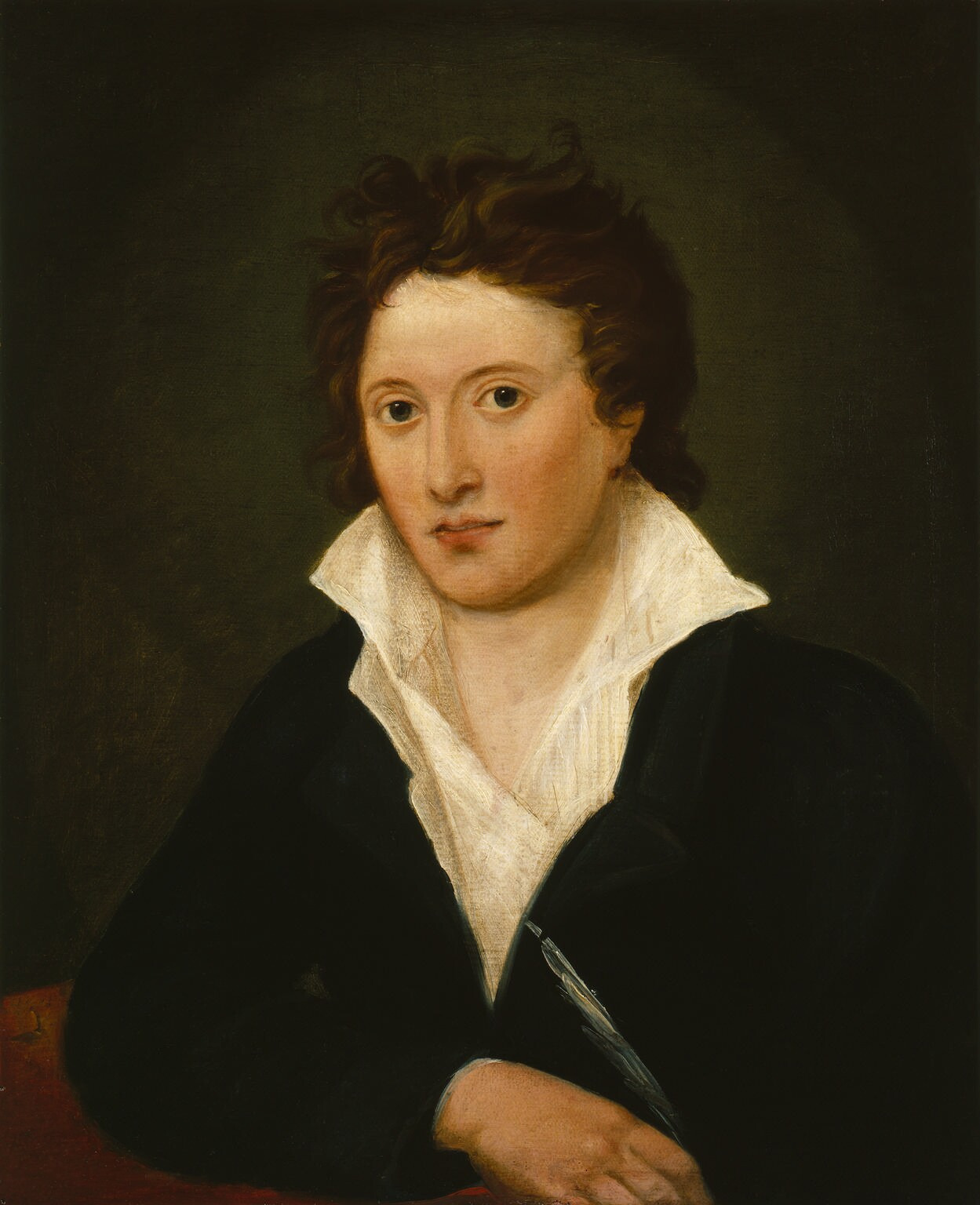
Percy Bysshe Shelley imbibed his radical philosophy from William Godwin's Political Justice. (Amelia Curran, 1819)

Mary Godwin and Percy Shelley met and fell in love in 1814. Percy Shelley initially visited the Godwin household because he was interested in meeting his philosophical hero, Mary's father, William Godwin. However, Mary and Percy soon began having secret rendezvous, despite the fact that Percy was already married. To Mary's dismay, her father disapproved of their extramarital affair and tried to thwart the relationship. On 28 July 1814, Mary and Percy secretly left for France, taking Mary's stepsister, Claire Clairmont, with them.

The trio travelled for six weeks, from 28 July to 13 September 1814, through France, Switzerland, Germany, and the Netherlands (which is referred to as "Holland"); however, they were forced to return to England due to financial considerations. The situation upon their return was fraught with complications: Mary had become pregnant with a child who would soon die, she and Percy now found themselves penniless, and, to Mary's genuine surprise, her father refused to have anything to do with her.

In May 1816, Mary Godwin, Percy Shelley, and their second child travelled to Geneva with Claire Clairmont. They spent the summer months with the Romantic poet Lord Byron, but, as Mary Shelley later wrote of the year without a summer, "[i]t proved a wet, ungenial summer and incessant rain often confined us for days to the house". (Note: The violent storms were, it is now known, a repercussion of the volcanic eruption of Mount Tambora in Indonesia the year before.) The group spent their time writing, boating on Lake Geneva, and talking late into the night. Sitting around a log fire at Byron's villa, the company also amused themselves by reading German ghost stories, prompting Byron to suggest they each write their own supernatural tale. Mary Godwin began writing what she assumed would be a short story, but with Percy Shelley's encouragement and collaboration, she expanded this tale into her first novel, Frankenstein: or, The Modern Prometheus.

Mary, Percy, and Claire returned to England in September and on 30 December 1816 Percy and Mary married (two weeks after the death of Percy's first wife), healing the family rift. In March 1817, the Shelleys and Claire moved to Marlow, Buckinghamshire. At Marlow, they entertained friends, worked hard at their writing, and often discussed politics. Early in the summer of 1817, Mary Shelley finished Frankenstein, which was published anonymously in January 1818. She also began work on History of a Six Weeks' Tour, which was published in November 1817.

== Composition and publication ==
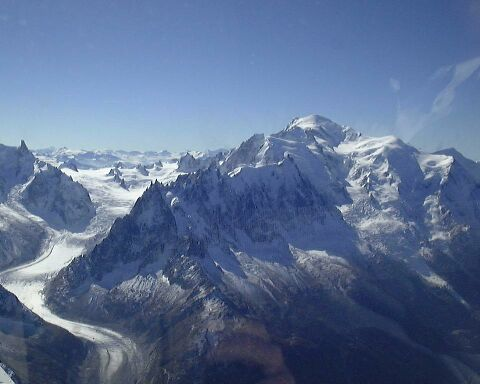
Mont Blanc and the Mer de Glace glacier were focal points of the Shelleys' 1816 journey.

In the summer of 1817, Mary Shelley started to assemble the couple's joint diary from their 1814 journey into a travel book. At what point she decided to include the letters from the 1816 Geneva trip and Percy Shelley's poem "Mont Blanc" is unclear, but by 28 September the journal and the letters were a single text. By the middle of October she was making fair copies for the press and correcting and transcribing Frankenstein for publication while Percy was working on The Revolt of Islam. Percy probably corrected and copyedited the journal section while Mary did the same for his letters. Advertisements for the work appeared on 30 October in the Morning Chronicle and on 1 November in The Times, promising a 6 November release. However, the work was not actually published until 12 and 13 November. It was Mary Shelley's first published work. (Note: Frankenstein was not published until January 1818.)

History of a Six Weeks' Tour begins with a "Preface", written by Percy Shelley, followed by the journal section. The journal consists of edited entries from the joint diary that Percy and Mary Shelley kept during their 1814 trip to the Continent, specifically those from 28 July to 13 September 1814. Of the 8,500 words in the journal section, 1,150 are from Percy's entries and either copied verbatim or only slightly paraphrased. Almost all of the passages describing the sublime are in Percy's words. (Note: That is, the passages describing God in nature, experiences of terror and awe, the transportation of the soul, and particularly the feeling of being overwhelmed by the majesty of nature. For a detailed list of which sentences are copied verbatim, see The Prose Works of Percy Bysshe Shelley.) When Mary turned to her own entries, however, she significantly revised them; according to Jeanne Moskal, the editor of the recent definitive edition of the Tour, "almost nothing of her original phrasing remains". She even included sections of Claire Clairmont's journal.

The second section of the text consists of four "Letters written during a Residence of Three Months in the Environs of Geneva, in the Summer of the Year 1816". The first two letters are signed "M" and the second two "S". The first two are attributed to Mary Shelley, but their origin is obscure. As Moskal writes, "the obvious inference is that they are literary versions of lost private epistles to Fanny Godwin", Mary Shelley's stepsister who remained in England and with whom she corresponded during the journey. However, Moskal also notes that there is a missing Mary Shelley notebook from precisely this time, from which the material in these letters could have come: "It is extremely likely that this notebook contained the same kind of mix of entries made by both Shelleys that the surviving first (July 1814 – May 1815) and second (July 1816 – June 1819) journal notebooks exhibit....Furthermore, Letter I contains four short passages found almost verbatim in P. B. Shelley's letter of 15 May to T. L. Peacock." The third and fourth letters are composites of Mary's journal entry for 21 July and one of Percy's letters to Peacock.

The third section of the text consists only of Percy's poem "Mont Blanc. Lines written in the vale of Chamouni"; it was the first and only publication of the poem in his lifetime. It has been argued by leading Percy Shelley scholar Donald Reiman that the History of a Six Weeks' Tour is arranged so as to lead up to "Mont Blanc". However, those who see the work as primarily a picturesque travel narrative argue that the descriptions of Alpine scenes would have been familiar to early nineteenth-century audiences and they would not have expected a poetic climax.

In 1839, History of a Six Weeks' Tour was revised and republished as "Journal of a Six Weeks' Tour" and "Letters from Geneva" in Essays, Letters from Abroad, Translations and Fragments, by Percy Bysshe Shelley, Edited by Mrs. Shelley (1840). Although these works were not by her husband, she decided to include them because they were "part of his life", as she explained to her friend Leigh Hunt. She appended her initials to the works to indicate her authorship. As Moskal explains, "the unity of the 1817 volume as a volume was dissolved" to make way for a biography of Percy Shelley. After Percy Shelley drowned in 1822, his father forbade Mary Shelley from writing a memoir or biography of the poet. She therefore added significant biographical notices to the edited collections of his works. The 1840 version of History of a Six Weeks' Tour has four major types of changes according to Moskal: "(i) modernization and correction of spelling, punctuation and French (ii) self-distancing from the familial relationship with Claire Clairmont (iii) a heightened sensitivity to national identity (iv) presentation of the travelers as a writing, as well as reading, circle". As a result of these changes, more of Percy Shelley’s writing was included in the 1840 version than in the 1817 version. In 1845, Mary Shelley published a one-volume edition with additional minor changes, based on the 1840 version.

== Description ==
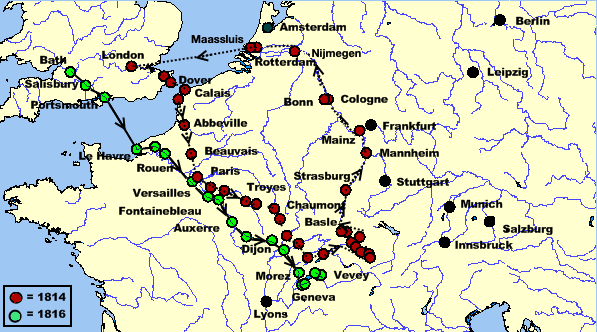
The dotted line and red dots indicate towns visited on the 1814 European tour; the solid line and green dots indicate towns visited on the 1816 trip to Lake Geneva.

History of a Six Weeks' Tour consists of three major sections: a journal, letters from Geneva, and the poem "Mont Blanc". It begins with a short preface, which claims "nothing can be more unpresuming than this little volume" and makes it clear that the couple in the narrative is married (although Mary and Percy were not at the time).

The journal, which switches between the first-person singular and plural but never identifies its narrators, describes Percy, Mary, and Claire's 1814 six-week tour across the Continent. It is divided by country: France, Switzerland, Germany, and the Netherlands. After the group arrives in Calais and proceeds to Paris, they decide on a plan: "After talking over and rejecting many plans, we fixed on one eccentric enough, but which, from its romance, was very pleasing to us. In England we could not have put it in execution without sustaining continual insult and impertinence: the French are far more tolerant of the vagaries of their neighbours. We resolved to walk through France". Each day they enter a new town; but even while travelling, they spend time writing and reading. The journal comments on the people they meet, the countryside, and the current events that have shaped the environment. Some of what they see is beautiful and some is "barren and wretched". Percy sprains his ankle, which becomes an increasing problem—the group is forced to hire a carriage. By the time the trio reaches Lucerne, they are nearly out of money and decide to return home. They return by boat along the Rhine, the cheapest mode of travel. Despite problems with unreliable boats and dangerous waters, they see some beautiful scenery before landing in England.

The four "Letters from Geneva" cover the period between May and July 1816, which the Shelleys spent at Lake Geneva and switch between the singular and plural first-person. Letters I, II, and IV describe the sublime aspects of Mont Blanc, the Alps, Lake Geneva, and the glaciers around Chamonix:

Mont Blanc was before us, but it was covered with cloud; its base, furrowed with dreadful gaps, was seen above. Pinnacles of snow intolerably bright, part of the chain connected with Mont Blanc, shone through the clouds at intervals on high. I never knew—I never imagined what mountains were before. The immensity of these serial summits excited, when they suddenly burst upon the sight, a sentiment of extatic [sic] wonder, not unallied to madness.

Letter III describes a tour around the environs of Vevey and other places associated with the Enlightenment philosopher Jean-Jacques Rousseau: "This journey has been on every account delightful, but most especially, because then I first knew the divine beauty of Rousseau's imagination, as it exhibits itself in Julie."

"Mont Blanc" compares the sublime aspect of the mountain to the human imagination:

The everlasting universe of things
Flows through the mind, and rolls its rapid waves,
Now dark—now glittering—now reflecting gloom...
Thus thou, ravine of Arve—dark, deep ravine—
Thou many-coloured, many-voiced vale...

While emphasising the ability of the human imagination to uncover truth through a study of nature, the poem also questions religious certainty. However, according to the poem only a privileged few are able to see nature as it truly is and reveal its secrets to the world.

== Genre ==
Mary Shelley wrote of the 1814 trip that "it was acting in a novel, being an incarnate romance". (Richard Rothwell, 1840)

History of a Six Weeks' Tour is a travel narrative, part of a literary tradition begun in the seventeenth century. Through the sixteenth, seventeenth, and eighteenth centuries, Continental travel was considered educational: young, aristocratic gentlemen completed their studies by learning European languages abroad and visiting foreign courts. In the early seventeenth century, however, the emphasis shifted from classical learning to empirical experience, such as knowledge of topography, history, and culture. Detailed travel books, including personal travel narratives, began to be published and became popular in the eighteenth century: over 1,000 individual travel narratives and travel miscellanies were published between 1660 and 1800. The empiricism that was driving the Scientific Revolution spread to travel literature; for example, Lady Mary Wortley Montagu included information she learned in Turkey regarding smallpox inoculation in her travel letters. By 1742, critic and essayist Samuel Johnson was recommending that travellers engage in "a moral and ethical study of men and manners" in addition to a scientific study of topography and geography.

Over the course of the eighteenth century, the Grand Tour became increasingly popular; travel to the Continent for Britain's elite was not only educational but also nationalistic. All aristocratic gentlemen took similar trips and visited similar sites, often devoted to developing an appreciation of Britain from abroad. The Grand Tour was celebrated as educational travel when it involved exchanging scientific information with the intellectual elite, learning about other cultures, and preparing oneself to lead. However, it was condemned as trivial when the tourist simply purchased curio collectibles, acquired a "superficial social polish", and pursued fleeting sexual relationships. During the Napoleonic Wars, the Continent was closed to British travellers and the Grand Tour came under increasing criticism, particularly from radicals such as William Godwin who scorned its aristocratic connections. Young Romantic writers criticised its lack of spontaneity; they celebrated Madame de Staёl's novel Corinne (1807), which depicts proper travel as "immediate, sensitive, and above all [an] enthusiastic experience".

A new form of travel emerged—Romantic travel—which focused on developing "taste", rather than acquiring objects, and having "enthusiastic experiences". History of a Six Weeks' Tour embodies this new style of travel. It is a specifically Romantic travel narrative because of its enthusiasm and the writers' desire to develop a sense of "taste". The travellers are open to new experiences, changing their itinerary frequently and using whatever vehicles they can find. For example, at one point in the journal, Mary Shelley muses:

The money we had brought with us from Paris was nearly exhausted, but we obtained about £38. in silver upon discount from one of the bankers in the city, and with this we resolved to journey towards the lake of Uri, and seek in that romantic and interesting country some cottage where we might dwell in peace and solitude. Such were our dreams, which we should probably have realized, had it not been for the deficiency of that indispensable article money, which obliged us to return to England.

Not everything she encounters is beautiful, however, and she juxtaposes her distaste for the German working class with her delight with French servants. Although politically liberal, Mary Shelley is aesthetically repelled by the Germans and therefore excludes them. Unlike the non-discriminating Claire Clairmont, Shelley feels free to make judgments of the scenes around her; Shelley writes that Claire "on looking at this scene...exclaimed, 'Oh! this is beautiful enough; let us live here.' This was her exclamation on every new scene, and as each surpassed the one before, she cried, 'I am glad we did not stay at Charenton, but let us live here' ". Shelley also compares herself positively to the French peasants who are unaware that Napoleon has been deposed. As scholar Angela Jones contends, "Shelley may be said to figure herself as a more knowledgeable, disinterested English outsider capable of rendering impartial judgment"—an Enlightenment value.

However, as Romanticist Jacqueline Labbe argues, Mary Shelley challenges the conventions of the Romantic travel narrative as well. For example, one reviewer wrote, "now and then a French phrase drops sweetly enough from [the author's] fair mouth", and as Labbe explains, these phrases are supposed to lead the reader to imagine a "beautiful heroine and her group passing easily from village to village". However, both French quotations in History of a Six Weeks' Tour undercut this Romantic image. The first describes the overturning of a boat and the drowning of its occupants; the second is a warning not to travel on foot through France, as Napoleon's army has just been disbanded and the women are in danger of rape.

While the overarching generic category for History of a Six Weeks' Tour is that of the travel narrative, its individual sections can be considered separately. The first journey is told as a "continuous, undated diary entry" while the second journey is told through epistolary and lyric forms. Moskal agrees with Reiman that the book was constructed to culminate in "Mont Blanc" and she notes that this was accomplished using a traditional hierarchy of genres—diary, letters, poem—a hierarchy that is gendered as Mary Shelley's writings are superseded by Percy's. However, these traditional gender-genre associations are undercut by the implicit acknowledgment of Mary Shelley as the primary author, with her journal giving the entire work its name and contributing the bulk of the text.

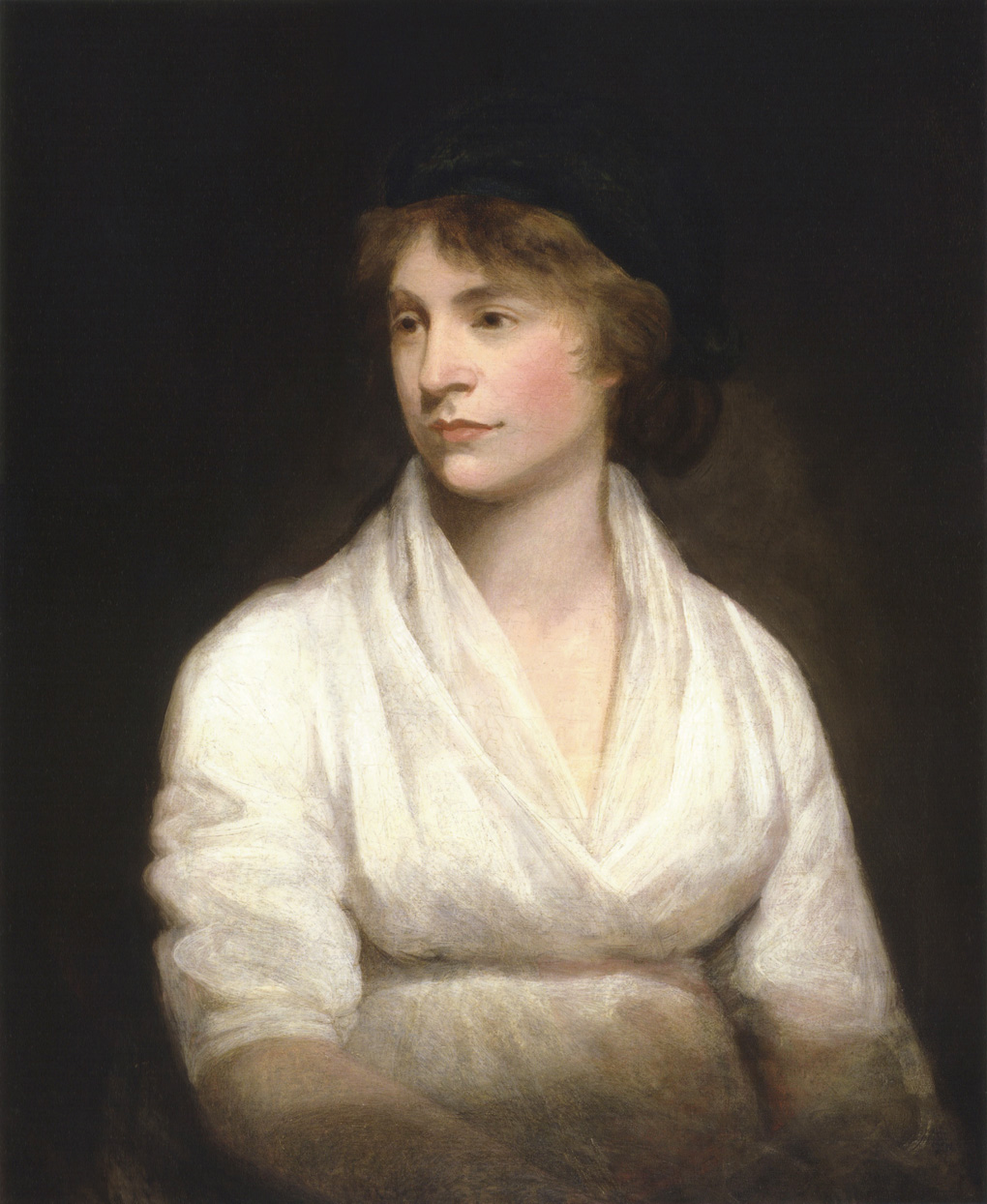
The group read Mary Wollstonecraft's Letters Written in Sweden, Norway, and Denmark while on their 1814 tour, which subsequently influenced History of a Six Weeks' Tour.

The journal is also threaded through with elements of the medieval and Gothic romance tradition: "accounts of ruined castles, enchanting valleys, and sublime views". In fact, in "The English in Italy", Mary Shelley writes of the journey that "it was acting in a novel, being an incarnate romance". However, these romantic descriptions are often ambiguous. Often single sentences contain juxtapositions between "romance" and "reality": "Many villages, ruined by war, occupied the most romantic spots". She also references Don Quixote, but he was "famous for his delusions of romance", as Labbe points out. Mary Shelley's allusions to Cervantes's Don Quixote (1605) not only places her text in a romance tradition, they would also have hinted at its radicalism to contemporary readers. During the 1790s, Mary Shelley's father, William Godwin, connected his support for the French Revolution with the romance tradition, specifically Don Quixote and any allusion to the novel would have signalled Godwinian radicalism to readers at the time. It would also have suggested support for reform efforts in Spain, which was rebelling against Napoleon. The beginning of the journal is dominated by romance conventions, but this style disappears when the travellers run out of money. However, romance conventions briefly return during the trip down the Rhine. As Labbe argues, "it would appear that while [Shelley] seems to be industriously salting her narrative with romance in order, perhaps, to garner public approval, she also ... exposes the falsity of such a scheme."

One of the most important influences on History of a Six Weeks' Tour was Letters Written in Sweden, Norway, and Denmark (1796), written by Mary Shelley's mother Mary Wollstonecraft. A travel narrative that reflects on topography, politics, society, aesthetics, and the author's personal feelings, it provided a model for Mary Shelley's work. Like her mother, Mary Shelley revealed her liberalism by boldly discussing politics; however, this political tone was unusual for travel works at the time and was considered inappropriate for women writers. Like Wollstonecraft's Letters, History of a Six Weeks' Tour blurs the line between private and public spheres by using intimate genres such as the journal and the letter, allowing Mary Shelley to present political opinions through personal anecdote and the picturesque.

== Themes ==
Napoleon Crossing the Alps by Jacques-Louis David (1801–05)

History of a Six Weeks' Tour is part of a liberal reaction to recent history: its trajectory begins with a survey of the devastation of the Napoleonic Wars and ends by celebrating the sublime in nature. William Wordsworth's 1850 The Prelude and the third canto of Byron's Childe Harold's Pilgrimage follow a similar course. As Moskal explains, "nature is troped as the repository of a sublimity, once incarnated in Napoleon, that will re-emerge in politics". The book is therefore not only a liberal political statement but also a Romantic celebration of nature.

The journal begins with, as Moskal describes, a "view of Napoleon's shattered political power". He had just been exiled to Elba a few months before the Shelleys arrived in Europe. Surveying the devastation caused by the Napoleonic Wars, Mary Shelley worries about how the British will handle Paris and grieves over the "ruin" brought to the small French town of Nogent by the Cossacks. Between the two journeys recorded in the text, Napoleon returned to power in the so-called Hundred Days and was defeated at the Battle of Waterloo in 1815. The four letters from Geneva reflect obliquely on this event. As Moskal argues, "the Shelleys focus on the forms of sublimity and power that outlast Napoleon: the literary genius of Rousseau and the natural sublimity of Lake Geneva and Mont Blanc". Both Shelleys use their works in History of a Six Weeks' Tour to assess and evaluate the French Revolution, making it a highly political travel narrative. In Letter II, Mary Shelley writes:

Here a small obelisk is erected to the glory of Rousseau, and here (such is the mutability of human life) the magistrates, the successors of those who exiled him from his native country, were shot by the populace during that revolution, which his writing mainly contributed to mature, and which, notwithstanding the temporary bloodshed and injustice with which it was polluted, has produced enduring benefits to mankind.

Mary Shelley also includes positive portrayals of the French people. As Mary Shelley scholar Betty T. Bennett explains, "politically pointed, these accolades underscore the link between the 1814 defeated enemy of Britain and the pre-Napoleon democratic spirit of the 1789 Revolution, a spirit the Shelleys wished to reactivate".

Lives of people interested Mary Shelley and she recorded them, but she also recorded a great deal of the travellers' own feelings, suggesting to the reader the appropriate reaction. For example, she wrote of the French town Nogent:

Nothing could be more entire than the ruin which these barbarians had spread as they advanced; perhaps they remembered Moscow and the destruction of the Russian villages; but we were now in France, and the distress of the inhabitants, whose houses had been burned, their cattle killed, and all their wealth destroyed, has given a sting to my detestation of war, which none can feel who have not travelled through a country pillaged and wasted by this plague, which, in his pride, man inflicts upon his fellow.

== Reception ==
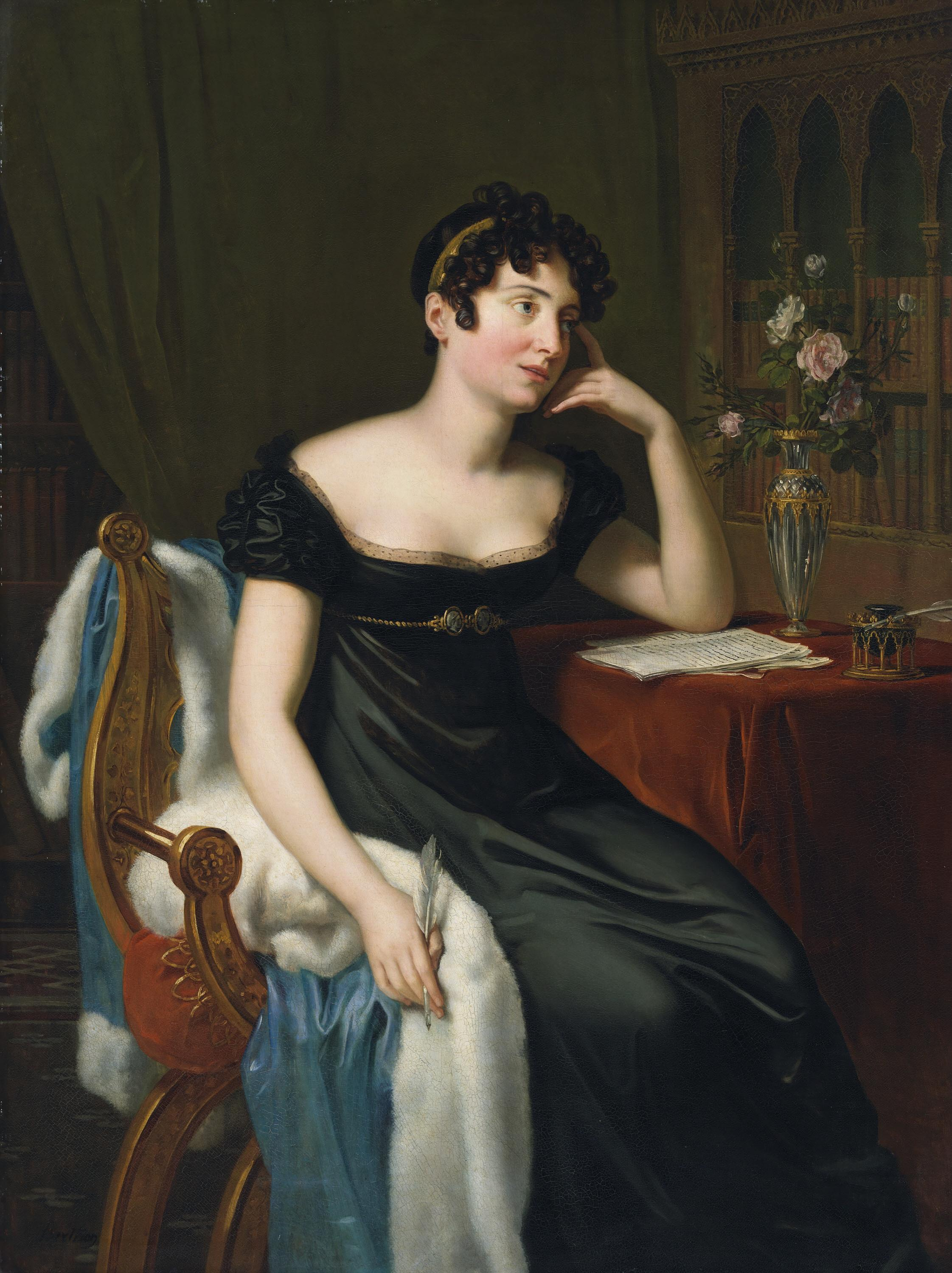
Comparing the liberal Lady Morgan to the writer of History of a Six Weeks' Tour, the Blackwood's Magazine reviewer favoured the writer of the Tour, apparently missing the liberal themes in Mary Shelley's writing.

History of a Six Weeks' Tour received three major reviews, mostly favourable. However, the book did not sell well. Percy Shelley discovered in April or May 1820 that there were no profits to pay the printer and when Charles Ollier, the co-publisher, went out of business in 1823, his inventory included 92 copies of the work. Still, Mary Shelley believed the work was successful, and when she proposed another travel narrative, Rambles in Germany and Italy, to publisher Edward Moxon in 1843, she wrote "my 6 weeks tour brought me many compliments". Her comments may have been self-interested, however.

The first review of History of a Six Weeks' Tour was published by The Eclectic Review in May 1818, which reviewed the book along with publisher Thomas Hookham's account of a Swiss tour, A Walk through Switzerland in September 1816. Although both works share the same fascination with Rousseau and his liberal ideas, only Hookham is attacked; as scholar Benjamin Colbert explains, "Shelley tends to remain on more neutral territory", such as the cult of sensibility and the novel Julie. However, the reviewer questions the authenticity of the work: "To us...the value of the book is considerably lessened by a strong suspicion that the dramatis personae are fictitious, and that the little adventures introduced for the purpose of giving life and interest to the narration, are the mere invention of the Author." He identifies passages that remind him of similar travel narratives by Patrick Brydone, Ann Radcliffe, and John Carr, effectively identifying the generic tradition in which the Shelleys were writing.

The second and most positive review was published by Blackwood's Edinburgh Magazine in July 1818. The reviewer was most impressed with the journal section, particularly its informality and concision: "the perusal of it rather produces the same effect as a smart walk before breakfast, in company with a lively friend who hates long stories". Covertly comparing the work to bluestocking Lady Morgan's recent France (1817), the reviewer found the female writer of History of a Six Weeks' Tour much more favourable: "The writer of this little volume, too, is a Lady, and writes like one, with ease, gracefulness, and vivacity. Above all, there is something truly delightful in the colour of her stockings; they are of the purest white, and much more becoming than the brightest blue." The Monthly Review published a short review in January 1819; they found the first journey "hurried" but the second one better described.

For most of the nineteenth and twentieth centuries, Mary Shelley was known as the author of Frankenstein and the wife of famous Romantic poet Percy Bysshe Shelley. It was not until the 1970s, with the rise of feminist literary criticism, that scholars began to pay attention to her other works. In fact, with the exception of Frankenstein and The Last Man, until the 1990s almost all of Mary Shelley's writings had gone out of print or only been available in expensive, scholarly editions. It was not until the publication of scholarship by Mary Poovey and Anne K. Mellor in the 1980s that Mary Shelley's "other" works—her short stories, essays, reviews, dramas, biographies, travel narratives, and other novels—began to be recognised as literary achievements.

== See also ==
- Mary Shelley bibliography

== Bibliography ==
- Bennett, Betty T. (1998). Mary Wollstonecraft Shelley: An Introduction. Baltimore: Johns Hopkins University Press. ISBN 0-8018-5976-X.
- Colbert, Benjamin (1999). "Contemporary Notice of the Shelleys' History of a Six Weeks' Tour: Two New Early Reviews". Keats-Shelley Journal. 48: 22–29. ISSN 0453-4387. JSTOR 30213019.
- Fisch, Audrey A.; Mellor, Anne K.; Schor, Esther H. (1993). "Introduction". In Fisch, Audrey A.; Mellor, Anne K.; Schor, Esther H. (eds.). The Other Mary Shelley: Beyond Frankenstein. Oxford: Oxford University Press. pp. 3–14. ISBN 9780195077407.
- Fludernik, Monika (5 November 2001). "Sublime". Sublime. The Literary Encyclopedia. (subscription required)
- Jones, Angela D. (1994). "Lying Near the Truth: Mary Shelley Performs the Private". In Conger, Syndy M.; Frank, Frederick S.; O’Dea, Gregory (eds.). Iconoclastic Departures: Mary Shelley after Frankenstein. Teaneck, NJ: Fairleigh Dickinson University Press. pp. 19–34. ISBN 9780838636848.
- Labbe, Jacqueline M. (1992). "A Family Romance: Mary Wollstonecraft, Mary Godwin, and Travel". Genre. 25. Duke University Press: 211–228. eISSN 2160-0228. hdl:2027/mdp.39015067497654. ISSN 0016-6928.
- Moskal, Jeanne (1996). "Introductory note". In Moskal, Jeanne (ed.). The Novels and Selected Works of Mary Shelley. The Pickering Masters. Vol. 8, Travel Writing. W. Pickering: London. ISBN 1-85196-076-7.
- Moskal, Jeanne (2003). "Travel writing". In Schor, Esther H. (ed.). The Cambridge Companion to Mary Shelley. Cambridge Companions to Literature. Cambridge: Cambridge University Press. pp. 242–258. doi:10.1017/CCOL0521809843.016. ISBN 9780511998829 – via Cambridge Core.
- Nitchie, Elizabeth (Winter 1961). "Mary Shelley, Traveler". Keats-Shelley Journal. 10: 29–42. ISSN 0453-4387. JSTOR 30210085.
- Rieder, John (Winter 1981). "Shelley's 'Mont Blanc': Landscape and the Ideology of the Sacred Text". ELH. 48 (4). The Johns Hopkins University Press: 778–798. doi:10.2307/2872961. eISSN 1080-6547. ISSN 0013-8304. JSTOR 2872961.
- Seymour, Miranda (2000). Mary Shelley. London: John Murray. ISBN 0-7195-5711-9.
- Shelley, Mary; Shelley, Percy (1817). History of a Six Weeks' Tour through a part of France, Switzerland, Germany, and Holland; with Letters Descriptive of a Sail Round the Lake of Geneva and of the Glaciers of Chamouni. London: T. Hookham, Jr. and C. and J. Ollier. hdl:2027/uc2.ark:/13960/t22b8zr78 – via HathiTrust.
- Shelley, Percy Bysshe (1993). Murray, E. B. (ed.). The Prose Works of Percy Bysshe Shelley. Vol. I. Oxford: Clarendon Press. ISBN 0-19-812748-0.
- Smith, Johanna M. (1996). Mary Shelley. New York: Twayne. ISBN 0-8057-7045-3.
- Spark, Muriel (1987). Mary Shelley. London: Cardinal. ISBN 0-7474-0318-X.
- St Clair, William (1989). The Godwins and the Shelleys: The Biography of a Family. London: Faber & Faber. ISBN 0-571-15422-0.
- Sunstein, Emily W. (1991). Mary Shelley: Romance and Reality. Baltimore: Johns Hopkins University Press. ISBN 0-8018-4218-2.
