= Mont Blanc (poem) =

Ode by Percy Shelley

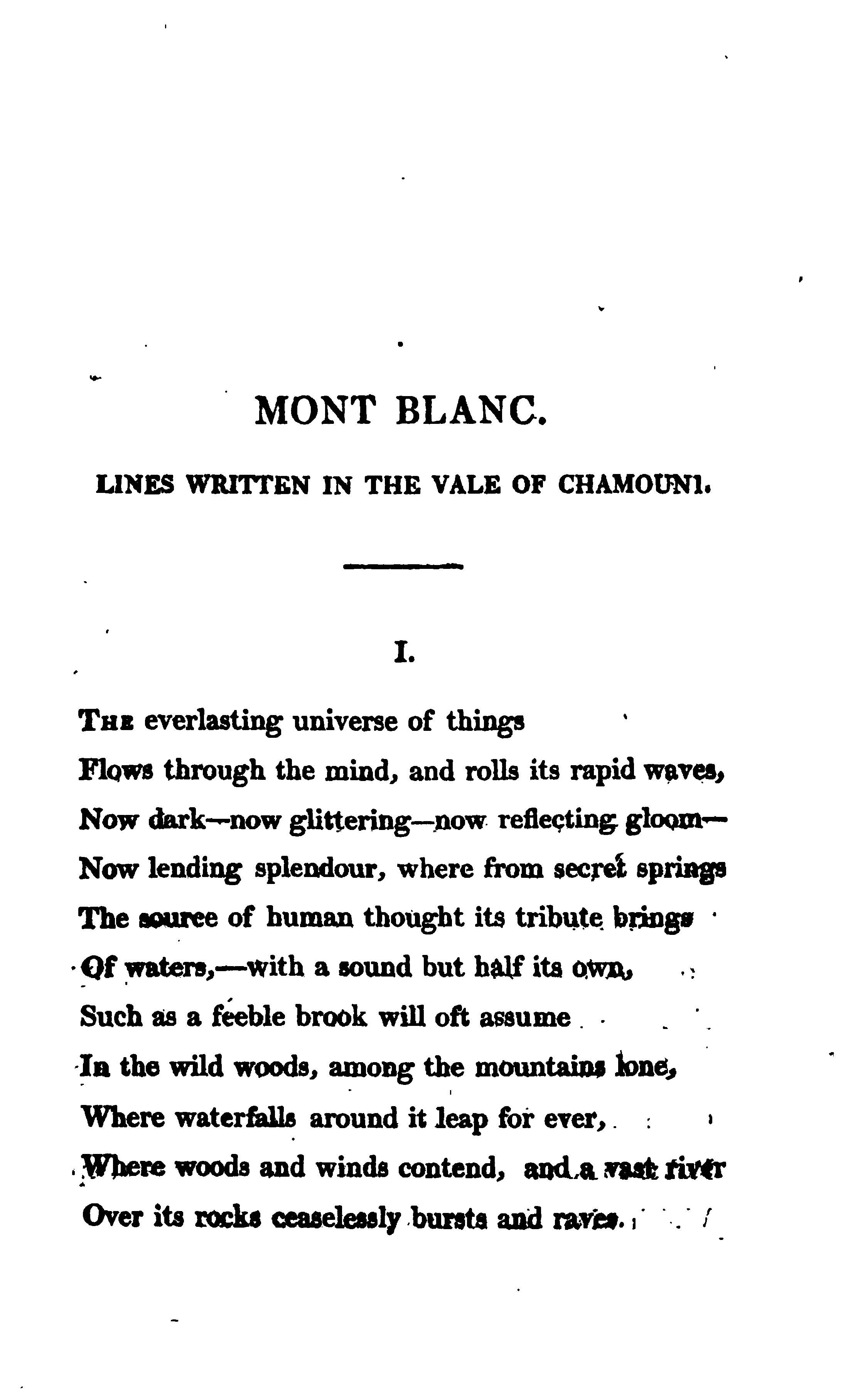
First page of "Mont Blanc" from History of a Six Weeks' Tour (1817)

Mont Blanc: Lines Written in the Vale of Chamouni is an ode by the Romantic poet Percy Bysshe Shelley. The poem was composed between 22 July and 29 August 1816 during Shelley's journey to the Chamonix Valley, and intended to reflect the scenery through which he travelled. "Mont Blanc" was first published in 1817 in Percy Shelley and Mary Shelley's History of a Six Weeks' Tour through a Part of France, Switzerland, Germany and Holland, which some scholars believe to use "Mont Blanc" as its culmination.

After Percy Shelley's early death in 1822, Mary Shelley published two collected editions of her husband's poetry, Posthumous Poems in 1824 and Poetical Works of Percy Bysshe Shelley in 1840; both of which included "Mont Blanc". Mary's promotion of his poetry helped to secure his enduring reputation and fame.

In "Mont Blanc", Percy Shelley compares the power of the mountain against the power of the human imagination. Although he emphasised the ability of the human imagination to uncover truth through a study of nature, he questions the notion of religious certainty. The poet concludes that only a privileged few can see nature as it really is, and are able to express its benevolence and malevolence through the device of poetry.

== Composition and publication ==
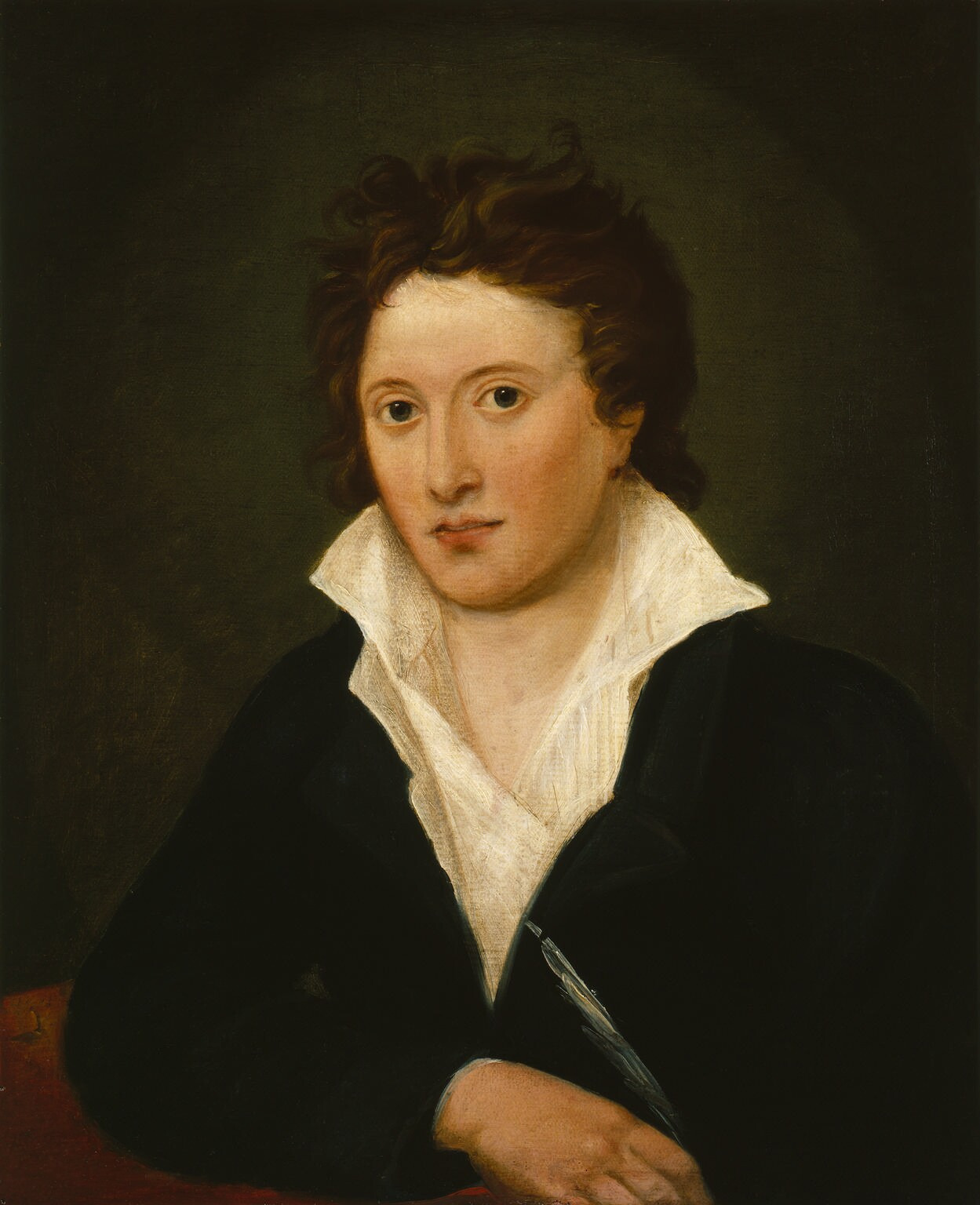
Percy Bysshe Shelley painted by Amelia Curran in 1819

Percy Shelley formulated "Mont Blanc" at the end of July 1816, when along with Mary Godwin and Claire Clairmont (Mary Godwin's step-sister) he toured the Arve Valley by Mont Blanc, Europe's highest mountain. Percy Shelley was inspired by the scenery surrounding a bridge over the river Arve in the Valley of Chamonix in Savoy, near Geneva, and decided to set his poem in a similar landscape. He wrote that his verse was "composed under the immediate impression of the deep and powerful feelings excited by the objects which it attempts to describe; and, as an undisciplined overflowing of the soul, rests its claim to approbation on an attempt to imitate the untamable wilderness and inaccessible solemnity from which those feelings sprang". Later, when describing the mountains in general terms, he wrote, "The immensity of these aerial summits excited when they suddenly burst upon the sight, a sentiment of ecstatic wonder, not unallied to madness."

He was just short of his 25th birthday when he began the draft, which he finished before September. It was published the following year in the volume he and Mary Shelley jointly compiled, their travel narrative History of a Six Weeks' Tour Through a Part of France, Switzerland, Germany and Holland.

The published edition was not based on the first finished copy of Shelley's poem, but on a second copy written after Shelley misplaced the first. The first manuscript copy contains many differences from the first published edition and was discovered in December 1976. Advertisements for the Tour appeared on 30 October in the Morning Chronicle and on 1 November in The Times, promising a 6 November release. However, it was not until 12 and 13 November that the work was actually published. It has been argued by leading Percy Shelley scholar Donald Reiman that History of a Six Weeks' Tour is arranged so as to lead up to "Mont Blanc". Tour editor Jeanne Moskal agrees with Reiman that the book was constructed to culminate in the poem and she notes that this was accomplished using a traditional hierarchy of genres—diary, letters, poem—a hierarchy that is gendered as Mary Shelley's writings are superseded by Percy's. However, these traditional gender-genre associations are undercut by the implicit acknowledgment of Mary Shelley as the primary author, with her journal giving the entire work its name and contributing the bulk of the text. Moreover, those who see the Tour as primarily a picturesque travel narrative argue that the descriptions of Alpine scenes would have been familiar to early nineteenth-century audiences and they would not have expected a poetic climax.

The publication of "Mont Blanc" in History of a Six Weeks' Tour was the first, and it was the only publication of the poem during Percy Shelley's lifetime. In 1824, two years after his death, Mary Shelley included it in the first collection of his poems entitled Posthumous Poems and later in her definitive Poetical Works of Percy Bysshe Shelley in 1840. Circumventing the ban that Percy Shelley's father had imposed upon her biographical writing, she added extensive editorial notes in these publications. She declared in 1824: "I am to justify his ways...I am to make him beloved to all posterity." As Mary Shelley scholar Betty T. Bennett explains, "biographers and critics agree that Mary Shelley's commitment to bring Shelley the notice she believed his works merited was the single, major force that established Shelley's reputation during a period when he almost certainly would have faded from public view".

Shelley's contemporary Lord Byron also wrote a poem titled Mont Blanc, incorporated in his Manfred.

== Poem ==
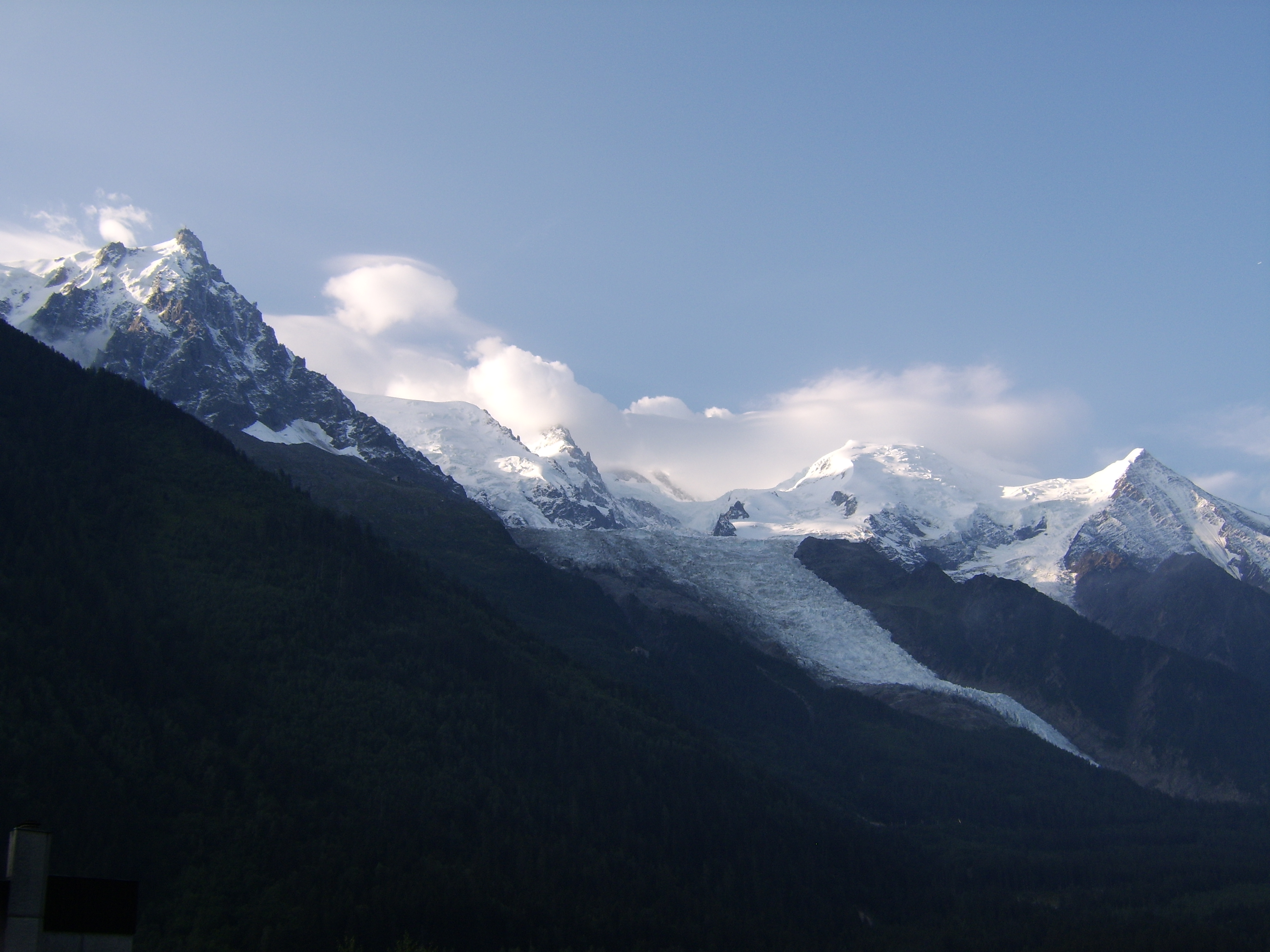
Mont Blanc viewed from Chamonix

"Mont Blanc" is a 144-line natural ode divided into five stanzas and written in irregular rhyme. It serves as Shelley's response to William Wordsworth's Tintern Abbey and as a "defiant reaction" against the "religious certainties" of Samuel Taylor Coleridge's "Hymn before Sun-rise, in the Vale of Chamouni", which "credits God for the sublime wonders of the landscape".

When the narrator of the poem looks upon Mont Blanc, he is unable to agree with Wordsworth that nature is benevolent and gentle. Instead, the narrator contends that nature is a powerful force:

The everlasting universe of things
Flows through the mind, and rolls its rapid waves,
Now dark—now glittering—now reflecting gloom—
Now lending splendour, where from secret springs
The source of human thought its tribute brings
Of waters... (Lines 1–5)

However, this force only seems to have power in relation to the human mind.

In the second stanza, the narrator turns to the Arve River as a representation of consciousness in nature. The Arve River and the ravine surrounding the river increase the beauty of the other:

...awful scene,
Where Power in likeness of the Arve comes down
From the ice gulphs that gird his secret throne,
Bursting through these dark mountains like the flame
Of lightning through the tempest... (Lines 15–19)

When the narrator witnesses the power of the Arve River, he claims:

I seem as in a trance sublime and strange
To muse on my own separate phantasy,
My own, my human mind, which passively
Now renders and receives fast influencing,
Holding an unremitting interchange
With the clear universe of things around; (Lines 35–40)

He realises that knowledge is a combination of sensory perceptions and the ideas of the mind. The river can then serve as a symbol of a conscious power and a source for imaginative thought when he finishes the stanza, "thou art there!"

The third stanza introduces the connections between Mont Blanc and a higher power:

Far, far above, piercing the infinite sky,
Mont Blanc appears,—still, snowy, and serene—
Its subject mountains their unearthly forms
Pile around it, ice and rock; broad vales between
Of frozen floods, unfathomable deeps,
Blue as the overhanging heaven, that spread
And wind among the accumulated steeps; (Lines 60–66)

Although the power may seem removed from mankind, it can still serve as a teacher. By listening to the mountain, one can learn that nature can be both benevolent and malevolent; good and evil emerge from conscious choice and one's relationship to nature:

The wilderness has a mysterious tongue
Which teaches awful doubt, or faith so mild,
So solemn, so serene, that man may be
But for such faith with nature reconciled;
Thou hast a voice, great Mountain, to repeal
Large codes of fraud and woe; not understood
By all, but which the wise, and great, and good
Interpret, or make felt, or deeply feel.(Lines 76–83)

The fourth stanza discusses the greater power behind the mountain:

Power dwells apart in its tranquility
Remote, serene, and inaccessible:
And this, the naked countenance of earth,
On which I gaze, even these primeval mountains
Teach the adverting mind.... (Lines 96–100)

The power of the mountain, which encompasses both creation and destruction, parallels the power of the imagination.

Although nature can teach one about the imagination and offer truths about the universe, the poem denies the existence of natural religion. The power of the universe is symbolised by Mont Blanc, but for that power to have any meaning, one must exercise the imagination:

Mont Blanc yet gleams on high:—the power is there,
The still and solemn power of many sights,
And many sounds, and much of life and death....

...The secret strength of things
Which governs thought, and to the infinite dome
Of heaven is as a law, inhabits thee!
And what were thou, and earth, and stars, and sea,
If to the human mind's imaginings
Silence and solitude were vacancy?(Lines 127–129, 139–144)

=== Variations ===
In both language and philosophy, the first published edition of the poem varies from the copy found in the Scrope Davies Notebook and the original manuscript draft. An important distinction between the published text and the manuscript versions is the line "But for such faith", which reads "In such a faith" in both the Scrope Davies notebook and the original manuscript. Critic Michael O'Neill argues that the Scrope Davies's version "makes the more evident sense, though it possibly sacrifices some of the tension" of the published version; he contends that the published version "is cryptic and tortuous, and yet the fact remains that Shelley chose to print the poem with this reading in his lifetime."

== Themes ==
"Mont Blanc" concerns the human mind and its ability to comprehend truth.

Carol Rumen in 2013 in The Guardian: While sometimes described as an ode, the poem is more intellectually rigorous than the title implies. A superb, sometimes personified portrait of the Alpine landscape, "Mont Blanc" also traces a journey through philosophical and scientific concepts that had yet to find a modern vocabulary. The mountains, falls and glaciers are not only geological entities as an explorer would see them or spiritual embodiments as they might be for Wordsworth: they inspire radical questions about meaning and perception."

Its main theme examines the relationship between the human mind and the universe; the poem discusses the influence of perception on the mind, and how the world can become a reflection of the operation of the mind. Although Shelley believed that the human mind should be free of restraints, he also recognised that nothing in the universe is truly free; he believed that there is a force in the universe to which the human mind is connected and by which it is influenced. Unlike Coleridge, Shelley believed that poets are the source of authority in the world, and unlike Wordsworth, believed that there was a darker side of nature that is an inherent part of a cyclical process of the universe, a notion similar to the theory put forth by the French naturalist George Cuvier.

The poem's relationship with the mountain becomes a symbol for the poet's relationship with history. The poet is privileged because he can understand the truth found in nature, and the poet is then able to use this truth to guide humanity. The poet interprets the mountain's "voice" and relays nature's truth through his poetry. The poet, in putting faith in the truth that he has received, has earned a place among nature and been given the right to speak on this truth. Nature's role does not matter as much as the poet's mediation between nature and man. Shelley, and the poet in "Mont Blanc", opposes organised religion and instead offers an egalitarian replacement. However, only a select few can truly understand the secrets of the universe.

== Reception ==
History of a Six Weeks' Tour received three reviews at the time of its publication, all generally favourable. Blackwood's Edinburgh Magazine quoted extensive excerpts from the third stanza, which contains similar themes and symbols as the "Letters from Geneva" in the Tour. The reviewer wrote that that poem was "too ambitious, and at times too close an imitation of Coleridge's sublime hymn on the vale of Chamouni". As critic Benjamin Colbert explains in his analysis of the reviews, "what points Shelley seems to score with this reviewer are not based on his originality or the provocative implications of his descriptions, but on his approximation of a success already mapped out by other travel writers".
