= Love's Philosophy =

1819 poem by Percy Bysshe Shelley

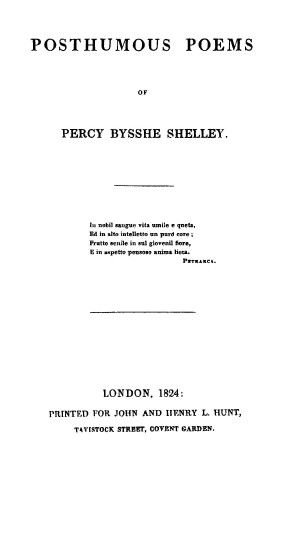
"Love's Philosophy" was collected in the 1824 anthology Posthumous Poems, John and Henry L. Hunt, London.

"Love's Philosophy" is a poem by Percy Bysshe Shelley published in 1819 and collected in Posthumous Poems in 1824.

== Background ==
The poem was published by Leigh Hunt in the 22 December 1819 issue of The Indicator and reprinted in Posthumous Poems in 1824 edited by Mary Shelley. It was included in the Harvard manuscript book where it is headed "An Anacreontic", dated "January, 1820". Anacreontics are poems written in the style of the ancient Greek poet Anacreon, known for his celebrations of love. Shelley wrote it in a copy of Leigh Hunt's Literary Pocket-Book, 1819, which was presented to Sophia Stacey, 29 December 1820.

The poem is divided in two 8-line stanzas with an ABABCDCD rhyme scheme.

The main theme is the relationship between the "connection" that exists for things in the natural world and the poet's desire to be connected to his object of affection. Shelley asks how there can be unity in nature but a lack of union in human relationships.

The poetic devices which Shelley uses in the poem include:

- personification: "Fountains mingle with the river; Winds of heaven mix forever with a sweet emotion; The mountains kiss high heaven; The waves clasp one another; Moonbeams kiss the sea)",
- metaphor: "No sister flower could be forgiven if it disdained its brother", and
- a rhetorical question: "If thou kiss not me?"

== In popular culture ==
British composer Frederick Delius set the poem to music in 1891 as part of his 3 English Songs. British composer Roger Quilter set the poem to music in 1905 in the composition Love's Philosophy, Op. 3, No 1.

In 2003, David Gompper set the poem to music in a score for baritone and piano.

Choral composer David N. Childs set the poem to music scored for a four-part women's choir and piano.

It was featured in "Vienna, November 1908", the fifteenth episode of The Young Indiana Jones Chronicles.

The second stanza of the poem appears in the second season of Twin Peaks, Episode 16 ("The Condemned Woman"), Windom Earle uses Percy Bysshe Shelley's poem "Love's Philosophy" to taunt his victims, sending fragments of the second stanza to Shelley, Audrey, and Donna. The poem, which highlights natural, interconnected romance, reads in part: "See the mountains kiss high heaven / And the waves clasp one another; ... What are all these kissings worth, / If thou kiss not me?".

The poem was featured in the Season 2, Episode 1 of Lewis (TV Series) "And The Moonbeams Kiss the Sea" directed by Dan Reed and written by Alan Plater.

Caroline Kennedy features the poem in her poetry anthology She Walks in Beaty, where she writes that "Percy Bysshe Shelley expresses the delights of kissing".

== Sources ==
- Bonca, Teddi Chichester. Shelley's Mirrors of Love: Narcissism, Sacrifice, and Sorority. Albany: State University of New York Press, 1999.
- Kennedy, Caroline. She Walks in Beauty: A Woman's Journey Through Poems. New York: Voice, 2011.
- Shelley, Percy Bysshe. The Selected Poetry and Prose of Shelley. Ware, Hertfordshire, UK: The Wordsworth Poetry Library, 2002.
- Shelley, Percy Bysshe. The Complete Poems of Percy Bysshe Shelley. New York: The Modern Library, 1994.
- Stovall, Floyd. "Shelley's Doctrine of Love". PMLA, Volume 45, Issue 1: American Bibliography for 1929, March 1930, pp. 283 - 303. DOI: https://doi.org/10.2307/457741
