= Music, When Soft Voices Die =

- by Percy Bysshe Shelley
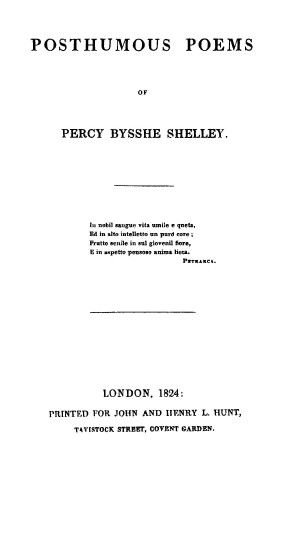
- "Music, When Soft Voices Die" first appeared in Posthumous Poems, John and Henry L. Hunt, London, 1824.
- First published in: Posthumous Poems
- Subject(s): Endurance of the memories of events and of sensations
- Publisher: John and Henry L. Hunt
- Publication date: 1824
- Lines: 8

"Music, When Soft Voices Die" is a poem by Percy Bysshe Shelley, written in 1821 and first published in the collection Posthumous Poems of Percy Bysshe Shelley in 1824 in London by John and Henry L. Hunt with a preface by Mary Shelley. The poem is one of the most anthologised, influential, and well-known of Shelley's works.

== Text ==
Music, When Soft Voices Die

Music, when soft voices die,
Vibrates in the memory;
Odours, when sweet violets sicken,
Live within the sense they quicken.

Rose leaves, when the rose is dead,
Are heap'd for the belovèd's bed;
And so thy thoughts, when thou art gone,
Love itself shall slumber on.

== Summary ==
The poem was published as "To---" in 1824 under Miscellaneous Poems in Posthumous Poems. It is composed of two stanzas containing two couplets each.

The theme of the poem is the endurance of the memories of events and of sensations.

Mary Shelley edited the poems and wrote the preface to the collection. She described the poems: "Many of the Miscellaneous Poems, written on the spur of the occasion, and never retouched, I found among his manuscript books, and have carefully copied: I have subjoined, whenever I have been able, the date of their composition."

== Musical compositions ==
Many composers and musicians have set the poem to music with vocal accompaniment. Among the composers are Charles Wood as a three-part song in 1915, Frank Bridge, for mixed chorus a capella, in 1904, Eric Nelson in 1999, Canadian composer Stephen Chatman, as a part of his set "There Is Sweet Music Here," in 1993, Sir Charles Hubert Parry in 1897, Three Songs, Opus 12, Ralph Vaughan Williams in 1893, Sergei Taneyev, Opus 17, No. 3, Pust' otsvuchit, in 1905, Rebecca Clarke for mixed chorus in 1907, Peter Warlock in 1911 (two versions), Liza Lehmann for voice and piano, Henry Cowell in 1922, Jack Gibbons, Opus 17, Samuel Barber, for piano and voice in 1926, Ernest Gold, Quincy Porter in 1947, Edward Bairstow, in 1929, Roger Quilter, for voice and piano, Opus 25, No. 5, in 1927, John Harbison for SATB choir and organ or harpsichord in 1966, Tobias Picker for piano in 1977, Stephen Chatman for chorus and oboe in 1984, Geoffrey Bush for chorus, and David Diamond for voice and piano.
