= The Witch of Atlas =

Poem by Percy Bysshe Shelley

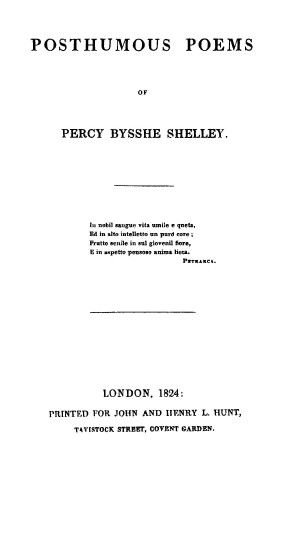
First appearance in Posthumous Poems, 1824.

The Witch of Atlas is a major poetic work of the English romantic poet Percy Bysshe Shelley written in 1820 and published posthumously in 1824 in the Posthumous Poems collection. The poem was written in 78 ottava rima stanzas during the period when Prometheus Unbound and "The Cloud" were written and reflects similar themes. The theme of the poem is a quest for perfect union.

British composer Sir Granville Bantock wrote a tone poem for orchestra based on the Shelley poem in 1902, The Witch of Atlas: Tone Poem for Orchestra No.5 after Shelley, which was first performed on 10 September 1902.

== History ==
The Witch of Atlas was composed in three days at the Baths of San Giuliano, near Pisa, Italy from 14 to 16 August 1820, after Shelley had climbed the Monte San Pellegrino mountain on foot. It was published in Posthumous Poems in 1824 edited by Mary Shelley. The work, which Shelley called "a fanciful poem", was dedicated to Mary Shelley, the dedication "To Mary" first appearing in the Poetical Works edition of 1839. Mary Shelley wrote that The Witch of Atlas "is a brilliant congregation of ideas such as his senses gathered, and his fancy coloured, during his rambles in the sunny land he so much loved." She objected, however, that Shelley was "discarding human interest and passion" in favour of "fantastic ideas" which were "abstract" and "wildly fanciful" and "full of brilliant imagery". She argued that Shelley should have written works that were more consonant with the popular tastes of that time: "The surpassing excellence of The Cenci had made me greatly desire that Shelley should increase his popularity by adopting subjects that would more suit the popular taste than a poem conceived in the abstract and dreamy spirit of the Witch of Atlas." Shelley responded in the prefatory verses that she was "critic-bitten ... by some review" and defended the work as "a visionary rhyme". The Witch of Atlas contained Utopian themes that first had appeared in Queen Mab (1813).

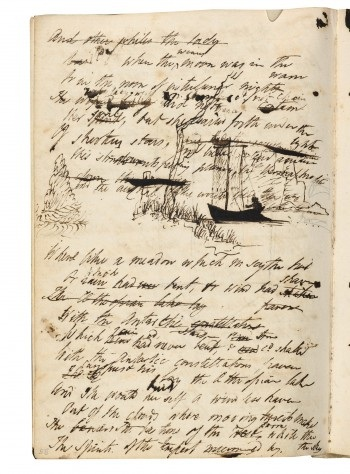
Draft of The Witch of Atlas, 1820. Bodleian Library, Oxford.

== Plot ==
The plot of The Witch of Atlas revolves around the travels and adventures of a mysterious and mythical Witch who lives in a cave on Atlas' mountain by a secret fountain and who creates a hermaphrodite "by strange art" kneading together fire and snow, a creature, Hermaphroditus, "a sexless thing", with both male and female characteristics, with pinions, or wings. A "fair Shape out of her hands did flow" because "all things together grow/ Through which the harmony of love can pass." In Greek mythology, Hermaphrodite was the offspring of Hermes and Aphrodite. The hermaphrodite is androgynous and synthesises the opposing and contradictory aspects of the creative mind. The hermaphrodite is both the companion and the servant to the Witch. The journeys consist of sailing in the air on an airship and in water on a boat, or pinnace. They travel from the Atlas Mountains to the Austral Lake to the Nile Valley. Nature is explored as are fire and electrical energy. The Witch begins her sojourn from the ancient northern Ethiopian city of Axume. Lake Moeris, an ancient lake southwest of Cairo, Egypt, is visited, as are the Mareotid lakes south of Alexandria. King Amasis of Egypt, Memphis, and the bull god Apis are invoked. The forces of creation and destruction are resolved. The objective is a synthesis or union of contradictions.

The Witch is the daughter of the Atlantides, who in Greek mythology are called the Pleiades, the seven daughters of Atlas and Pleione. Her home, the Atlas Mountains, are a range that stretches across north Africa, from Morocco and Algeria to Tunisia. Her "choice sport" was to "glide adown" the Nile River into Egypt and Aethiopia with "tame water-snakes" and "ghastly alligators". She observed mankind at sleep. Injustice and inequality were noted: "And pale imaginings of visioned wrong;/ And all the code of Custom's lawless law/ Written upon the brows of old and young." It is this oppression and exploitation that trouble mankind's existence: "'This ... is the strife/ Which stirs the liquid surface of man's life.'"

The "visionary rhyme" recounts the pranks the Witch plays on mankind. Like Shelley himself, the Witch was able to perceive the fears and desires of mankind: "In mine own heart I saw as in a glass/ The hearts of others." She is able to see the "naked beauty" of the human soul. The Witch gave a "strange panacea in a crystal bowl" to those who were the most beautiful and imparted "strange dreams" to those who were less beautiful. The Witch sought to change man's perception of death. Death was not to be feared. The Witch took a coffin and "threw it with contempt into a ditch." The grave was "as a green and overarching bower/ Lit by the gems of many a starry flower." She sought to make the world more just and fair by making "more vain" all those purposes which were "harsh and crooked". The "miser" would place "all his evil gain" on a "beggar's lap". The "scribe" would reveal his own lies. Priests would reject dogma and "old cant". The king would place an ape on his throne and dress him up in his vestments while a "mock-bird" repeated the "chatterings of the monkey". War would be practiced no more as soldiers turned their swords into ploughshares on "red anvils". Finally, "timid lovers" would see the "fulfilment of their inmost thought." These are the pranks the Witch "played among the cities of mortal men." The Witch was able to envision and foresee a future Utopia for all mankind.

== Influence ==
William Butler Yeats' 1939 poem "Under Ben Bulben" references the Shelley poem by invoking "the Witch of Atlas" and the "Mareotid Lakes" together: "The poem begins with an allusion to Yeats’s favourite poet Shelley and his 'The Witch of Atlas'."

In 1902, Sir Granville Bantock composed a tone poem for orchestra based on the Shelley poem entitled The Witch of Atlas: Tone Poem for Orchestra No.5 after Shelley. The work was premiered on 10 September 1902.

== Sources ==
- The Witch of Atlas by Percy Bysshe Shelley at Infoplease. 2020.
- Adamson, Carlene A., ed. The Witch of Atlas Notebook: A Facsimile of Bodleian MS. Shelly adds., e.6. NY: Garland Publishing,1997.
- The Creative Mind: Shelley's Hermaphrodite, Agnes, Peter
- Allis, Michael, "Reading Music Through Literary Scholarship: Granville Bantock, Shelley, and The Witch of Atlas", Journal of Musicological Research, 36.1 (2017), pp. 6–28
- Alvey, Nahoko. Strange Truths in Undiscovered Lands: Shelley's Poetic Development and Romantic Geography. University of Toronto Press, 2009.
- Bloom, Harold. The Visionary Company: A Reading of English Romantic Poetry. Cornell University Press, 1971.
- Colbert, Benjamin. Shelley's Eye: Travel Writing and Aesthetic Vision. Ashgate Publishing, 2005.
- Colwell, Frederic S. "Shelley's 'Witch of Atlas' and the Mythic Geography of the Nile." ELH, 45, 1 (Spring, 1978), pp. 69–92.
- Cronin, Richard. "Shelley's 'Witch of Atlas'." Keats-Shelley Journal, 26, (1977), pp. 88–100.
- Duerksen, Ronald A. (1985). "Wordsworth and the Austral Retreat in Shelley's Witch of Atlas.'" Keats-Shelley Journal. 34.
- Goulding, Christopher. (September 2003). "Percy Shelley, James Lind, and 'The Witch of Atlas'." Notes & Queries.
- Grabo, Carl. The Meaning of The Witch of Atlas. Whitefish, MT: Kessinger, 2003.
- Greenfield, John. "Transforming the Stereotype: Exotic Women in Shelley's Alastor and The Witch of Atlas." The Foreign Women in British Literature. Eds. Marilyn Demarest Button & Toni Reed. Westport, CT: Greenwood P, 1999.
- Hoeveler, Diane Long. "Shelley and Androgyny: Teaching The Witch of Atlas." Approaches to Teaching Shelley's Poetry. Ed. Spencer Hall. New York: The Modern Language Association of America, 1990.
- Holmes, Richard. Shelley: The Pursuit. NY: NYRB Classics, 2003.
- Hughes, A.M.D. "Shelley's 'Witch of Atlas'." The Modern Language Review, 7, 4 (October 1912), pp. 508–516.
- "Talking Utopia: Percy Shelley and Iris Murdoch on Love, Art, and Morality.", Jacobs, Deborah.
- Lee, Debbie. (1997). "Mapping the Interior: African Cartography and Shelley's The Witch of Atlas." European Romantic Review, 8, pp. 169–84.
- Lee, Debbie. Slavery and the Romantic Imagination. Philadelphia, PA: University of Pennsylvania Press, 2004.
- "The Witch of Atlas and a Romantic Southern Geography.", Miyamoto, Nahoko. (1998). University of Toronto. Re-orienting Romanticism.
- Miyamoto, Nahoko. "Hybridity and Desire in Shelley's 'The Witch of Atlas'." Knox College, Toronto. Romantic Circles. American Conference on Romanticism Fifth Annual Meeting, 1998.
- Roberts, Hugh. Shelley and the Chaos of History: A New Politics of Poetry. Penn State Press, 1997.
- Stevenson, Warren. Romanticism and the Androgynous Sublime. London: Farleigh Dickinson University Press, 1996.
- "Romanticism and the Insistence of the Aesthetic: Shelley's Pod People.", Swan, Karen. Romantic Circles. Praxis Series.
- Tanquary, Kate. (Winter, 2008). "Gender Constructs and Creation from Frankenstein to The Witch of Atlas." The Common Room, 11, 1.
- Wood, Andelys. "Shelley's Ironic Vision: 'The Witch of Atlas'." Keats-Shelley Journal, 29, (1980), pp. 67–82.
- Yeats, W. B. (1900). "The Philosophy of Shelley's Poetry", in Essays and Introductions. New York: Macmillan Publishers, 1961. OCLC 362823
