= A Dirge =

Posthumous poem by Percy Bysshe Shelley

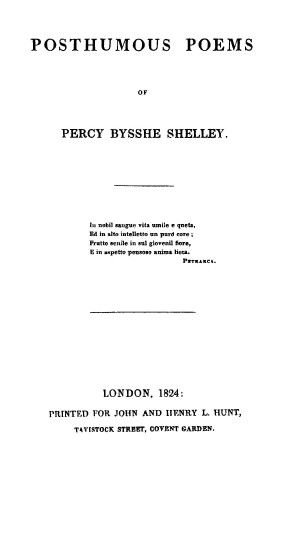
"A Dirge" appeared in the 1824 collection Posthumous Poems, John and Henry L. Hunt, London.

"A Dirge" is a poetic dirge composed by Percy Bysshe Shelley. It was published posthumously in 1824 by his wife, Mary Shelley, in the collection Posthumous Poems. The text has been set to music by Frank Bridge, Charles Ives, Ottorino Respighi, Roy Ewing Agnew, and Benjamin Britten.

== Structure ==
The rhyme scheme of the eight lines is ABAB CCCB. The triplet of vain/strain/main in the second half of the poem adds to the sense of the piling up of emotions. It also has the effect of slowing down the poem.

== Summary ==
The dominant themes of the poem are isolation, loneliness, and death. It is a scene of desolation and despair. The wind moans in a grief that cannot be expressed in words; the rain storm billows in vain; the trees are barren and their branches strain under the unceasing onslaught. A gloom pervades the world.

A dirge is a song meant to invoke and express the emotions of grief and mourning that are typical of a funeral. Images of nature are used to symbolize the grief he feels, such as the moaning and wild wind, the sullen clouds, the sad storm, the bare woods, the deep caves, and the dreary main. He imbues his natural surroundings with anthropomorphic characteristics and qualities to express his grief. The nouns are modified by adjectives that give them human attributes and traits to express his own emotions of dreariness and sadness. He concludes that the whole world is “wrong” and is grieving.

Shelley wrote the poem after the deaths of his friend John Keats and his son William who were buried in a cemetery in Rome. The untimely death of Keats reopened the floodgates of emotion for Shelley, inevitably leading him to reexperience the sadness and pain he felt for the death of his infant son.

In the second line, “Grief too sad for song,” Shelley argued that the grief was ineffable, inexpressible in words. There is no solace. The entire world is “wrong.”

The last line, “Wail, for the world’s wrong!”, provides a sense of hope and consolation.

== Poem ==
Rough wind, that moanest loud
Grief too sad for song;
Wild wind, when sullen cloud
Knells all the night long;
Sad storm whose tears are vain,
Bare woods, whose branches strain,
Deep caves and dreary main,—
Wail, for the world's wrong!
