= One Word is Too Often Profaned =

1824 Poem by Percy Bysshe Shelly

One Word is Too Often Profaned

ONE word is too often profaned
For me to profane it,
One feeling too falsely disdain'd
For thee to disdain it.
One hope is too like despair
For prudence to smother,
And pity from thee more dear
Than that from another.

I can give not what men call love;
But wilt thou accept not
The worship the heart lifts above
And the Heavens reject not:
The desire of the moth for the star,
Of the night for the morrow,
The devotion to something afar
From the sphere of our sorrow?

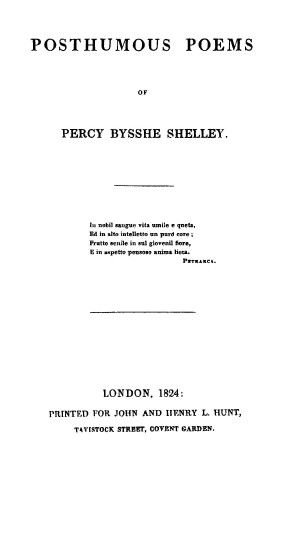
Published in Posthumous Poems, 1824.

"One Word Is Too Often Profaned" is a poem by Percy Bysshe Shelley, written in 1822 and published in 1824 in Posthumous Poems (see 1822 in poetry).

== Background ==
The poem was intended for Jane Williams. It expresses Shelley's deep and genuine devotion for her.

Shelley met Jane Williams and her lover, Edward Ellerker Williams, in Pisa sometime in 1821. The Williams befriended Percy Bysshe and Mary Shelley, and they all frequently met Lord Byron, who also lived in Pisa at that time.

Shelley developed a very strong affection towards Jane Williams and addressed a number of poems to her. In most of these poems, Shelley projects his love for Jane in a spiritual and devotional manner. This poem is an example of that. Shelley's affection towards Jane was known to Edward Williams and also to Mary Shelley. But since Shelley always projected this relationship in a platonic manner, Williams and Mary Shelley were not afflicted by jealousy regarding this relationship. In fact, Mary Shelley was quite fond of Jane and Edward Williams, and Shelley enjoyed Edward's company too. Shelley and Edward Williams drowned while on a boating trip on 8 July 1822.

Shelley wrote a number of poems devoted to Jane including With a Guitar, To Jane, One Word is Too Often Profaned, To Jane: The Invitation, To Jane: The Recollection and To Jane: The Keen Stars Were Twinkling.

In One Word is Too Often Profaned, Shelley rejects the use of the word Love to describe his relationship with Jane. He says that this word has been so often profaned or misused that he will not use it to describe this relationship. He then goes on to say that the usage of this word may be rejected by Jane herself and that his feelings for her are too pure to be falsely disdained.

He uses the word pity and states that the feeling of pity from Jane is more dear than love from any other woman. At this point he starts elevating Jane's stature to something larger than other women of the world. Shelley chooses to employ the word worship to describe his devotion towards Jane. He states that the feeling of worship that he feels towards Jane is something that is uplifting and is also moral (and the heavens reject not).

He describes the nature of his devotion: it is the devotion of a moth for a star or what the night feels towards the next morning. He describes his devotion as something that lies beyond worldly existence and strife (the sphere of our sorrow).

Shelley uses the sentence I can give not what men call love which shows that he himself is not averse to the use of the word love but because it has been misused often by men everywhere to describe ordinary and worldly feelings, he will not use this word for Jane.

The metrical feet used in the poem are a mixture of anapests and iambs. The first line of each couplet contains three accents and the second line contains two.

This poem has at times been printed with the titles To --- and Love.

The poem was published in London in 1824 in the collection Posthumous Poems of Percy Bysshe Shelley by John and Henry L. Hunt.

== Sources ==
- Fowler, John Henry. Notes to Palgrave's Golden Treasury of Songs and Lyrics. Books I-IV. London: Macmillan and Company, 1904.
- Shelley, Percy Bysshe. The Selected Poetry and Prose of Shelley. Ware, Hertfordshire, UK: The Wordsworth *Poetry Library, 2002.
- Shelley, Percy Bysshe. The Complete Poems of Percy Bysshe Shelley. New York: The Modern Library, 1994.
