= Bridge of Words =

2016 non-fiction book by Esther Schor

Bridge of Words: Esperanto and the Dream of a Universal Language
- Author: Esther Schor
- Language: English
- Subjects: Esperanto, interlinguistics
- Genres: Non-fiction, memoir
- Publisher: Metropolitan Books
- Publication date: 4 October 2016
- Pages: 384
- ISBN: 978-0-8050-9079-6
- Dewey Decimal: 499.992

Bridge of Words: Esperanto and the Dream of a Universal Language is a 2016 non-fiction book by American poet and professor Esther Schor. Concerning the history of Esperanto, the world's most widely spoken constructed language, it looks at various figures within Esperanto's history as well as Schor's own experiences with the language as an Esperantist.

== Background ==
Esperanto is the world's most widely spoken constructed language. Created by Polish doctor L. L. Zamenhof in 1887, it is intended to be a universal second language for international communication. The language prospered in the first half of the twentieth century, especially among communists, it enjoyed great support in the Soviet Union. However, in the lead up to and during World War II, Esperantists were persecuted in countries such as Nazi Germany, Portugal, and the Soviet Union – the movement was also quietened during the Cold War due to its associations with communism.

Esperanto is one of the only constructed languages to have native speakers, of which there are around 2,000. Estimates of the number of speakers worldwide vary greatly, but there are likely between one and two million; the concentration of speakers is highest in Europe, East Asia, and South America.

Esther Schor is an American scholar, essayist, and professor of American Jewish studies at Princeton University. Before Bridge of Words, she had written a biography of Emma Lazarus, which won the National Jewish Book Award, and published an anthology of original poetry. Schor is a writer for several publications, including The Forward, The New York Times Book Review, and The Times Literary Supplement.

== Synopsis ==
The flag of Esperanto

Bridge of Words is both an autobiographic memoir about Schor's relationship with Esperanto and the history of Esperanto, especially the connections between Esperanto and Judaism. The book is split into four parts: "The Dream of a Universal Language", "Doktoro Esperanto and the Shadow People", "The Heretic, the Priestess, and the Invisible Empire", and "Esperanto in a Global Babel" – each contains sections concerning both interlinguistics and Schor's travels with Esperanto.

In the introduction and first part, Schor introduces her first experiences with Esperanto, and gives a synopsis of its history. The first chapters give a history of attempts for a universal language, both philosophical languages and international auxiliary languages. Schor defines the start of the universal language movement as beginning with Francis Bacon's 1605 The Advancement of Learning, and discusses its opposition by figures such as John Locke. Schor writes about the creation of Esperanto and the systems behind its etymology and grammar. She recounts her experiences of learning Esperanto in a full immersion summer course held at the University of San Diego, recounting dialogue with Esperantists that she met there.

The second part discusses Zamenhof's relations with Judaism. After biographies of Markus and Rozalia Zamenhof, Zamenhof's parents, Schor describes antisemitism in the Russian Empire and Zamenhof's views on Zionism. Zamenhof's ideas for a reformation of both Yiddish and Judaism (in the form of Hillelism) are discussed. Schor also gives an account of the early history of Esperanto: early publications such as the Unua and Dua Libroj, La Esperantisto, as well as Zamenhof's 1894 attempts to reform the language are mentioned. Esperanto's increasing traction with the influence of Louis de Beaufront and the strained relations between Zamenhof and the leaders of Esperanto over Judaism are covered; Schor calls the creation of the Universal Esperanto Association vital to the movement's reparation after the schism that birthed Ido. Schor recounts her experiences at Esperanto conferences held in İzmir and Białystok: she describes the Anti-Esperanto sentiment seen there, with the vandalism of a statue of Zamenhof. She gives biographies of Esperantists such as Humphrey Tonkin and covers the role of the Akademio de Esperanto.

== Publication and reception ==
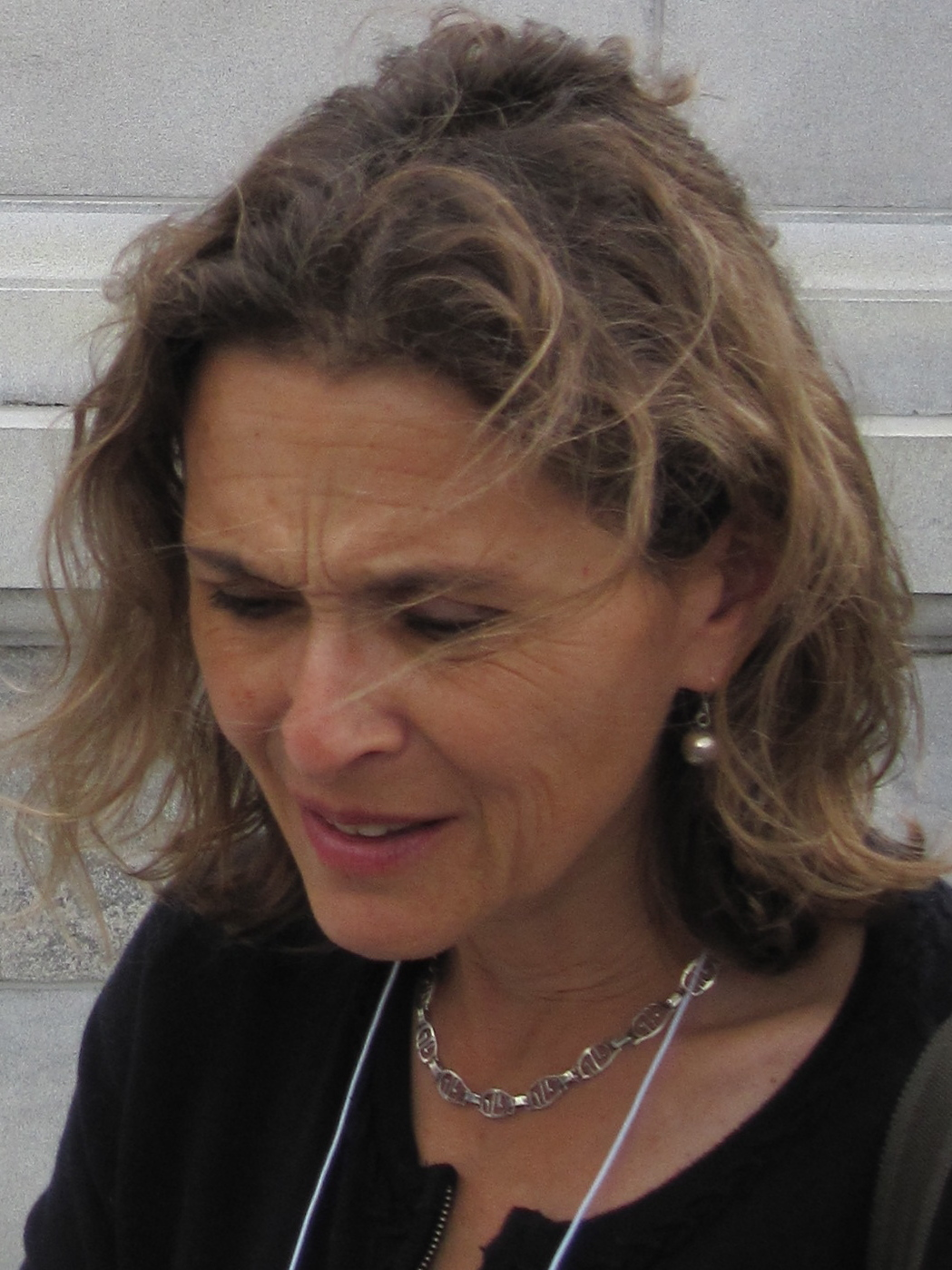
Schor in 2010, at an Esperanto-USA gathering

Bridge of Words was published on 4 October 2016 by Metropolitan Books, an imprint of Henry Holt and Company. It has 384 pages. Bridge of Words was not Schor's first work on Esperanto; she had previously written several articles concerning the language on the subject for the journal Language Problems and Language Planning, and delivered a TED talk, entitled "The Transformative Vision of Esperanto" at a TEDx conference in Rome in 2009. By the time of the book's publication, Schor had been part of the Esperanto community for seven years. Milwaukee Journal Sentinel's review discussed the depth of Schor's research, the inclusion of the information about her Esperantic experiences, its accessibility, and the passion she showed for the history of Esperanto.

=== Scholarship ===
Frederico Gobbo gave a positive review of the style of the book – "Schor's work is not a purely academic and scholarly work, even though the quantity and quality of the notes supporting the arguments is impressive. So, the book can be read like a novel. Moreover, Schor's language style is a real pleasure for the reader". However, he wrote that the quality of Esperanto in the book suffered from occasional "[o]dd expressions or errors" as a result of Schor not being entirely fluent. He also wrote that Schor placed a viewpoint too americentric in the work, with not enough focus on Esperanto in countries such as in Brazil or in France.

A review by Javier Alcalde in the European Journal of Jewish Studies called the book "a solid work, in many respects ground-breaking. A must-read for everyone interested in Jewish history, interlinguistics or social movements, but also for Esperantists themselves." Alcalde compared the work to Arika Okrent's In the Land of Invented Languages in that it followed the author's journey with Esperanto and Roberto Garvia's Esperanto and its Rivals in that it placed large importance on the role of Esperanto alongside other social movements. He found the interviews with Esperantists to be perhaps "the best study so far of the current community of Esperanto speakers", and praise Schor for "shed[ding] light on the difficulties faced by the Esperantists in a democratic regime during the McCarthy period." Alcalde criticised, however, inconsistencies in the book's essays, and an over-focusing on the author's experiences in California and Brazil as opposed to more history of Esperanto in Western Europe.

=== Content ===
Brit Peterson's review of the book in Slate called the autobiographical material "an unfortunate choice": "The sections in the past are for the most part much more interesting than those in the present." She discussed Schor's "complex goals" in writing the book, calling it "as ambitious, soulful, intellectually hefty, and yet occasionally naïve as the project it describes".

Paul Webb, writing for the Hong Kong Review of Books, saw her "flipping back and forth" between Esperanto history and her travels as "mak[ing] the historical chronology difficult to follow at times." Webb praised Schor for combining an "account of the facts of the matter with emotive and insightful pen portraits of individual Esperantists. Michael Wex had a "minor quibble" with the memoir parts of the book: "Schor is less assured as a memoirist than as a scholar, and while these latter sections are not without interest, they go on at greater lengths than the material warrants."

Michael Upchurch, reviewing in the Chicago Tribune, saw Schor's memoir material as a positive aspect of the work: "the memoir/travelogue vein of the book is relaxed and anecdotal". He wrote that "Schor's account of these controversies can get pretty tangled, but it's enlivened by crusaders' over-the-top rhetoric and detractors' withering put-downs." Ezra Glinter of Haaretz saw the memoir parts as "demonstrat[ing] anecdotally" Esperanto's strength: "While these parts of her book sometimes go astray ... they are also among the most delightful"; "her book provides a fascinating look into one of the most idealistic social movements of modern times."

Martin Rubin's review in The Washington Times saw Schor's enthusiasm as "infectious", but wrote that the book had "a certain breathlessness of tone" owing to her travels. He also criticized her coverage of Robert Cecil as superficial: "Ms. Schor's grossly inadequate characterization of him is yet another depressing example of the scholarly tunnel vision so prevalent in the groves of academe today." Joan Acocella of The New Yorker found the material about Zamenhof to be "by far the best part" - he disapproved of Schor "unloading personal matters" by wrote that Schor "ends on a strong, high note, taking on a number of what she calls myths about Esperanto".

The book was praised for its depth of scholarship on Esperanto's history and for Schor's passion for the subject: Chris Foran wrote in the Milwaukee Journal Sentinel that the book was a "meticulous recounting of Esperanto's organizational history", and viewed Schor's travels as "where the deep-rooted faith in the language emerges." Ross Perlin, reviewing in the Los Angeles Review of Books, praised the book as "a guide to this modern-day diaspora [Esperantujo], from a participant-observer attuned to the Jewish dialectic of universalism and particularism." A piece from Kirkus Reviews called the book "an illuminating, well-researched chronicle of the development of Esperanto", although it viewed Schor's writing about the future of Esperanto as "less persuasive". Joseph Lowin, reviewing for the Jewish Book Council called Schor "a writer of beautiful English and a thorough researcher and scholar".
