= Dirge =

Song that expresses lament or grief

A dirge (Latin: dirige, nenia) is a somber song or lament expressing mourning or grief, such as may be appropriate for performance at a funeral. Often taking the form of a brief hymn, dirges are typically shorter and less meditative than elegies. Dirges are often slow and bear the character of funeral marches. Poetic dirges may be dedicated to a specific individual or otherwise thematically refer to death.

The English word dirge is derived from the Latin Dirige, Domine, Deus meus, in conspectu tuo viam meam ("Direct my way in your sight, O Lord my God"), the first words of the first antiphon (a short chant in Christian liturgy) in the Matins of the Office for the Dead, based on Psalm 5. The original meaning of dirge in English referred to this office, particularly as it appeared in breviaries and primer prayer books.

== History ==
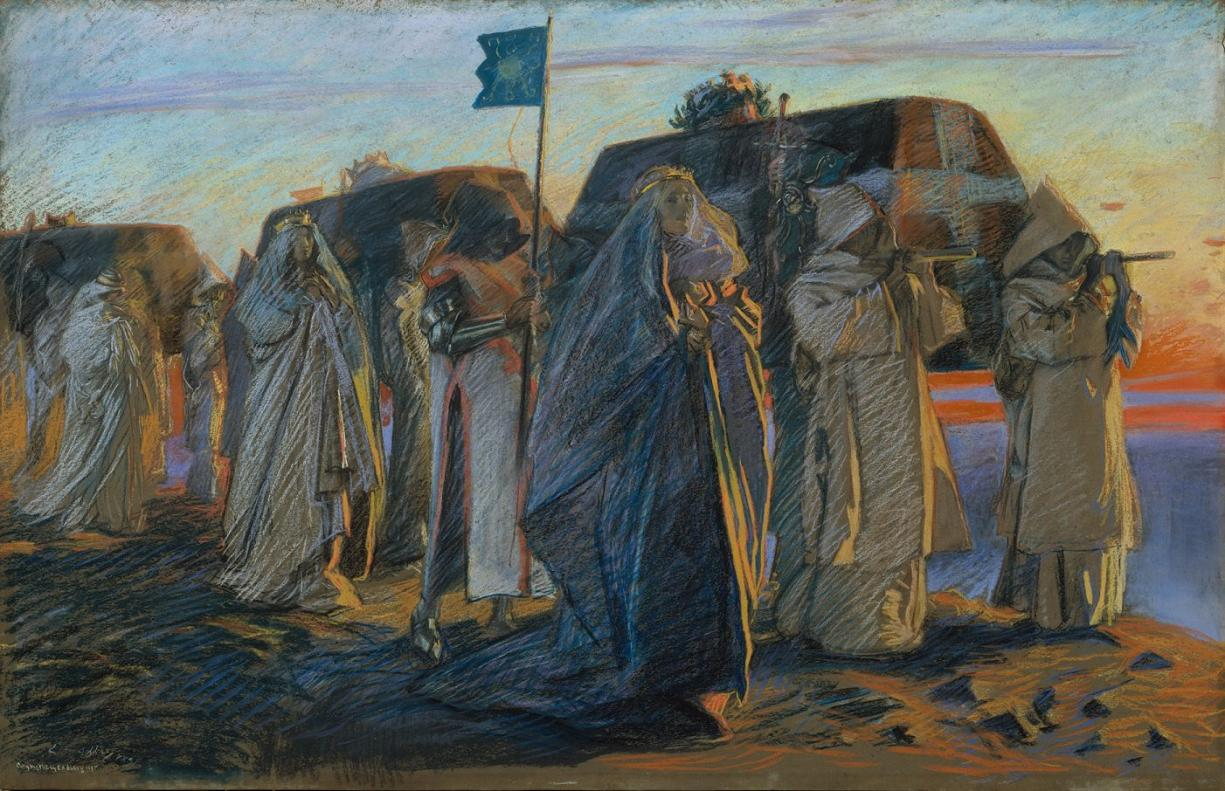
Dirge of Three Queens (c. 1895), by Edwin Austin Abbey, inspired by The Two Noble Kinsmen

In the late Medieval period, it was common for Western Christian laity–both men and women–to attend the celebration of the Divine Office (canonical hours) according to various editions of the breviary alongside members of monastic communities. However, the complexity of these breviaries proved prohibitive for a layperson to adopt in private use, so certain devotions that were invariable or only varied slightly day-to-day were adapted into primers.

Among the most consistent devotions within these primers was the Office of the Dead, a popular arrangement of the canonical hours as prayers for the dead. This office was itself typically divided into two hours for recitation at different times of day: Dirige (equivalent to Matins and Lauds) in the morning and Placebo (equivalent to Vespers or Evensong) in the evening. Both terms were derived from among first words always said when reciting those hours, with Dirige starting an antiphon derived from Psalm 5. Gradually, Dirige and eventually "dirge" came to refer to not only to the morning hour, but to the Office of the Dead as a whole and its pairing with the Psalms of Commendation (Psalms 119 and 139). This practice was codified in the 1559 standardized primer issued under Elizabeth I, wherein both hours appeared under the collective name Dirige.

Prior to the English Reformation, translated sections from the Dirige were among the most circulated vernacular portions of the Bible available in England as recitation by laity of these prayers was common at funerals and gravesites. Formal liturgical saying of the Dirige–then legally required to be in Latin–persisted through the first half of the 16th century, with occasional requirements that certain proportions of a parish church's congregation be present for such events.

The word dirge gradually came to be associated with the variety of funeral hymns it describes today. Among the earliest was a pre-Reformation funeral lament from the Cleveland area of north-east Yorkshire, England, known as the "Lyke-Wake Dirge". The contents are neither scriptural nor liturgical, but rather speak to the means of salvation through Christ via alms-giving. A simultaneous development was a funerary "tariff" wherein those present at the recitation of the canonical Dirige would be paid a small amount from the estate of the deceased. It is associated with the still-practiced Lyke Wake Walk, a 40-mile challenge walk across the moorlands of north-east Yorkshire, as the members' anthem of the Lyke Wake Club, a society whose members are those who have completed the walk within 24 hours. This dirge saw a resurgence in popularity in the 1960s following performances by English folk bands such The Young Tradition and Pentangle.

While private devotionals were proliferated under the Reform-minded Elizabeth, the number of permitted public liturgical devotions were targeted for curtailment. The Dirige was retained within the Elizabethan primer over Protestant objections to prayers for the dead and there remained resistance to the public liturgical performance of the devotion. In 1560 and 1561, episcopal visitors of the Church of England observed with disapproval the continued practice of clerks singing psalms in "dirge-like" fashion.

Since their evolution away from Christian usage, some dirges have intentionally been written to be set to music, while others have been set or reset at later dates. Among the latter cases is the "Dirge for Fidele", a portion of William Shakespeare's play Cymbeline that was later set to music by multiple composers.

== Notable dirges ==
- "A Dirge", by Christina Rossetti
- "A Dirge", by Percy Bysshe Shelley
- "Dirge for Fidele", by William Shakespeare from Cymbeline, set to music several times, including by Ralph Vaughan Williams and Gerald Finzi
- Lyke-Wake Dirge, repopularized in the 1960s by English folk groups
- "Ring Out Your Bells", by Sir Philip Sidney

== See also ==
- Cumha
- Death wail
- Funeral march
- Keening
- Kinnot
- Lament bass
- Requiem#Music

== Bibliography ==
- Marcello Sorce Keller, “Expressing, Communicating, Sharing and Representing Grief and Sorrow with Organized Sound (Musings in Eight Short Sentences)”, in Stephen Wild, Di Roy, Aaron Corn, and Ruth Lee Martin (eds.), Humanities Research: One Common Thread the Musical World of Lament, Australian National University, Vol. XIX (2013), no. 3, 3–14.
