= Julian and Maddalo =

"Julian and Maddalo: A Conversation"
- Short story by Percy Bysshe Shelley
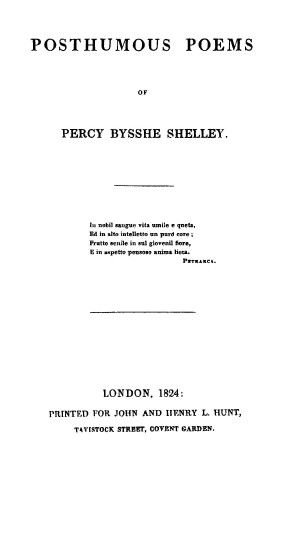
- Posthumous Poems of Percy Bysshe Shelley
- Country: United Kingdom
- Language: English
- Genres: Philosophical poem, dialogue

Publication
- Published in: Percy Bysshe Shelley Posthumous Poems
- Publisher: John and Henry L. Hunt
- Media type: Print (hardback)
- Publication date: 1824

Julian and Maddalo: A Conversation (1818–19) is a poem in 617 lines of enjambed heroic couplets by Percy Bysshe Shelley published posthumously in 1824 in the Posthumous Poems collection by John and Henry L. Hunt in London.

It is a narrative poem set in Venice exploring the conflict between optimism and pessimism, the tension between idealism and realism, hope and despair. In discussions and conversations between Julian (who represents Shelley) and Count Maddalo (who represents Lord Byron), they debate the power of the mind, the progress of mankind, and free will. During the tour, they visit an asylum where they encounter the Maniac.

== Background ==
This work was penned in the autumn of 1818 at a villa called I Capuccini, in Este, near Venice, which had been lent to Shelley by his friend Lord Byron, and it was given its final revision in 1819.

Shelley originally intended the poem to appear in The Examiner, a Radical paper edited by Leigh Hunt, but then decided instead on anonymous publication by Charles Ollier. This plan fell through, and Julian and Maddalo first appeared after Shelley's death in a volume of his works called Posthumous Poems in 1824 (see 1824 in poetry), edited by his widow Mary Shelley.

It is inspired by conversations Shelley had with Byron in Venice in 1818, in which they explored their different outlooks on life. Shelley described the visit: "Our conversation consisted in histories of his wounded feelings, & questions as to my affairs, & great professions of friendship & regard for me." The bitter cynicism of Count Maddalo in the poem reflects closely Lord Byron's views, as Julian's atheism and faith in the potentialities of man does those of Shelley himself. It is written in a conversational, natural style, which had not until then been usual in Shelley's works, and which may have been partly suggested by Byron's poem Beppo.

Julian and Maddalo was in its turn a strong influence on the dramatic monologues of Robert Browning.

== Characters ==
- Julian, the narrator, an idealistic Englishman who espouses an optimistic worldview that emphasises man's infinite possibilities for growth and improvement.
- Count Maddolo, a Venetian nobleman who is pessimistic about humanity but is himself wealthy, cultured, and educated.
- The Maniac, in an asylum, but was once a "cultivated and amiable" person, now suffering from dejection and despair.
- Count Maddalo's daughter, she relates to Julian the fate of the Maniac after he left Venice.

== Synopsis ==
1819 draft of Julian and Maddalo: A Conversation. Bodleian Library.

"Julian and Maddalo" is prefaced by a prose description of the main characters. Maddalo is described as a rich Venetian nobleman whose "passions and…powers are incomparably greater than those of other men; and, instead of the latter having been employed in curbing the former, they have mutually lent each other strength"; while Julian is said to be

an Englishman of good family, passionately attached to those philosophical notions which assert the power of man over his own mind, and the immense improvements of which, by the extinction of certain moral superstitions, human society may be yet susceptible…He is a complete infidel, and a scoffer at all things reputed holy.

The poem proper then begins with a depiction of the two title characters riding through a Venetian scene and discussing the subjects of religious faith, free will and progress. Julian

Argued against despondency, but pride
Made my companion take the darker side.
The sense that he was greater than his kind
Had struck, methinks, his eagle spirit blind
By gazing on its own exceeding light.

They then board the Count's gondola and pass a lunatic asylum, which provokes from Maddalo a comparison between the inmates' situation and the futility of all mortal life. The next day Julian visits Maddalo and meets his baby daughter (based on Byron's daughter Allegra), whose childish innocence inspires him to a statement of his own optimistic belief in the power of Good. Maddalo dismisses Julian's creed as utopian, and compares him with a former friend who has since gone mad known as the Maniac. They again take the gondola to the madhouse to meet this man, the Maniac, who tells them a confused and disconnected account of an ill-fated romance and of his abandonment by his lover. (This character has been identified by scholars as a composite of Shelley himself and the poet Tasso; the lover perhaps as Mary Shelley, whose relationship with the poet had lately been under some strain.) Julian and Maddalo are downcast by the Maniac's story, Maddalo commenting that

Most wretched men
Are cradled into poetry by wrong,
They learn in suffering what they teach in song.

Julian leaves Venice but, returning many years later, asks Maddalo's daughter about the madman or the Maniac and is told that his lover had returned and again left him, and that both were now dead. The story concludes with this statement: "I urged and questioned still, she told me how/All happened -- but the cold world shall not know."

== Sources ==
- Bowers, Will. "'More of Talk': 'Julian and Maddalo'." European Romantic Review 33.5 (2022): 653-665.
- Matthews, Geoffrey M. "'Julian and Maddalo': The Draft and the Meaning." Studia Neophilologica 35.1 (1963): 57-84.
- Havens, Raymond D. "'Julian and Maddalo'." Studies in Philology 27.4 (1930): 648-653.
- Everest, Kelvin. "Shelley's Doubles: An Approach to 'Julian and Maddalo'." Shelley. Routledge, 2014. 56-69.
- Hill, James L. "Dramatic Structure in Shelley's Julian and Maddalo." ELH 35.1 (1968): 84-93.
- Brewer, William D. "Questions without Answers: The Conversational Style of 'Julian and Maddalo'." Keats-Shelley Journal 38 (1989): 127-144.
- Hirsch, Bernard A. "'A Want of That True Theory': 'Julian and Maddalo' as Dramatic Monologue." Studies in Romanticism (1978): 13-34.
- Saveson, J. E. "Shelley's 'Julian and Maddalo'." Keats-Shelley Journal 10 (1961): 53-58.
- Wall, Shelley. "Baffled Narrative in 'Julian and Maddalo'." New Romanticisms: Theory and Critical Practice, ed. David L. Clark and Donald C. Goellnicht (Toronto: Univ. of Toronto Press, 1994) (1994): 52-68.
- Spence, Gordon. "The Maniac's Soliloquy in 'Julian and Maddalo'." The Keats-Shelley Review 4.1 (1989): 81-93.
- Ware, Tracy. "Problems of Interpretation and Humanism in" Julian and Maddalo"." Philological Quarterly 66.1 (1987): 109.
- Weineck, Silke-Maria. "'They Met - They Parted': On the Relationship between Poetry and Madness in 'Julian and Maddalo'." Studies in Romanticism 38.1 (1999): 89-101.
- Christie, William. "'Despondency and Madness': Shelley in Conversation with Byron in 'Julian and Maddalo'." The Byron Journal 21 (1993): 43-60.
- Kabitoglou, E. Douka. "Shelley's Dialogic Poetry: 'Julian and Maddalo'." Orbis Litterarum 47.2 (1992): 303-314.
- Dechêne, Antoine. "'But the Cold World Shall Not Know': A Reading of Percy Bysshe Shelley’s 'Julian and Maddalo' as a Detective Story." Clues: A Journal of Detection (McFarland & Company) 37.1 (2019).
