= Thomas Lovell Beddoes =

English poet, dramatist and physician (1803–1849)

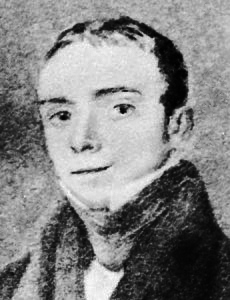
- Born: 30 June 1803; Clifton, Bristol, England
- Died: 26 January 1849 (aged 45); Basel, Switzerland
- Occupations: Physician, poet, dramatist

Thomas Lovell Beddoes (30 June 1803 – 26 January 1849) was an English poet, dramatist and physician.

== Biography ==
Born in Clifton, Bristol, England, he was the son of Dr. Thomas Beddoes, a friend of Samuel Taylor Coleridge, and Anna, sister of Maria Edgeworth. He was educated at Charterhouse and Pembroke College, Oxford. He published in 1821 The Improvisatore, which he afterwards endeavoured to suppress. His next venture, a blank-verse drama called The Bride's Tragedy (1822), was published and well reviewed, and won for him the friendship of Barry Cornwall.

Beddoes's work shows a constant preoccupation with death. In 1824, he went to Göttingen to study medicine, motivated by his hope of discovering physical evidence of a human spirit which survives the death of the body. He was expelled, and then went to Würzburg to complete his training. He then wandered about practising his profession, and expounding democratic theories which got him into trouble. He was deported from Bavaria in 1833, and had to leave Zürich, where he had settled, in 1840.

He continued to write, but published nothing. He led an itinerant life after leaving Switzerland, returning to England only in 1846, before going back to Germany. He became increasingly disturbed, and died by suicide by taking poison at Basel, in 1849, at the age of 45.

For some time before his death he had been engaged on a drama, Death's Jest Book, which was published in 1850 with a memoir by his friend, T. F. Kelsall. His Collected Poems were published in 1851.

== Reception ==
Critics have faulted Beddoes as a dramatist. According to Arthur Symons, "of really dramatic power he had nothing. He could neither conceive a coherent plot, nor develop a credible situation." His plots are convoluted, and such was his obsession with the questions posed by death that his characters lack individuation; they all struggle with the same ideas that vexed Beddoes.

However, his poetry is "full of thought and richness of diction", in the words of John William Cousin, who praised Beddoes's short pieces such as "If thou wilt ease thine heart" (from Death's Jest-Book, Act II) and "If there were dreams to sell" ("Dream-Pedlary") as "masterpieces of intense feeling exquisitely expressed". Lytton Strachey referred to Beddoes as "the last Elizabethan", and said that he was distinguished not for his "illuminating views on men and things, or for a philosophy", but for the quality of his expression.

Philip B. Anderson said the lyrics of Death's Jest-Book, exemplified by "Sibylla's Dirge" and "The Swallow Leaves Her Nest", are "Beddoes' best work. These lyrics display a delicacy of form, a voluptuous horror, an imagistic compactness and suggestiveness, and, occasionally, a grotesque comic power that are absolutely unique."

The Bride's Tragedy and especially Death's Jest-Book are much quoted from in epigraphs to the chapters of Dorothy L. Sayers' book Have His Carcase. More recently, Reginald Hill uses Beddoes in two of his Dalziel and Pascoe books, starting with Dialogues of the Dead (2001) and continuing with Death’s Jest-Book (2002). The latter features imagined scenes from Beddoes’ life, finishing with an account of his suicide.

In 1915, the English composer Gustav Holst composed a choral work, Dirge and Hymeneal, with a text by Beddoes. The composer then adapted parts of that work as the basis for Saturn in his renowned orchestral suite, The Planets. There are other musical settings by Denis ApIvor, Lennox Berkeley, Bernard van Dieren, Stephen Dodgson, William Hurlstone, John Ireland, Roger Quilter and Peter Warlock among others. There are 25 or more published settings of If there were dreams to sell.
