= Esther Schor =

American scholar (born 1957)

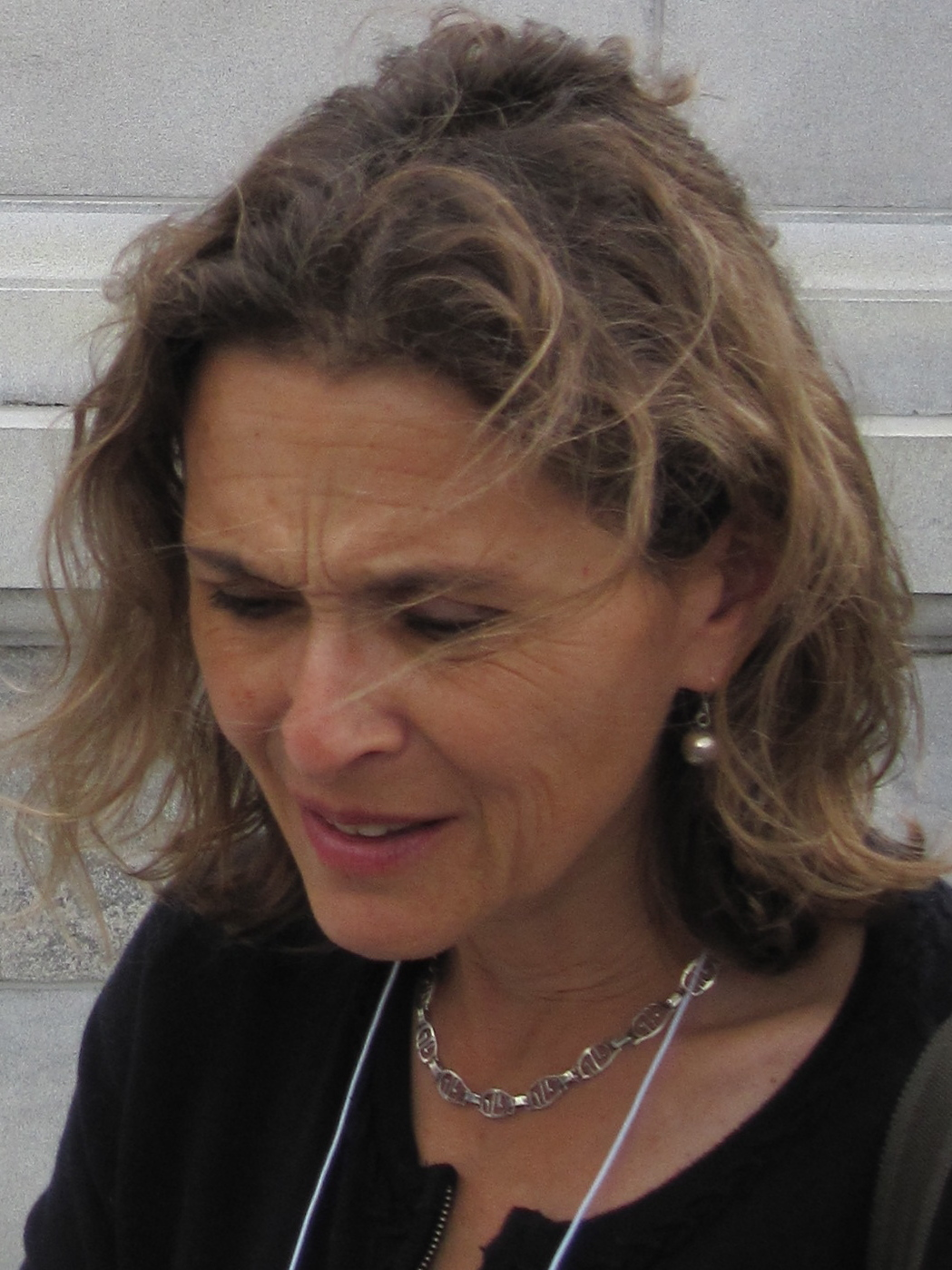
- Schor in 2010 at an Esperanto-USA meetup
- Born: June 20, 1957 (age 69)

Academic background
- Education: Yale University

Academic work
- Discipline: Philologist, literary scholar
- Sub-discipline: British Romanticism, American Jewish studies
- Institutions: Princeton University

Esther H. Schor is an American scholar, essayist, and professor of American Jewish studies at Princeton University. Completing a PhD at Yale University in 1985, she has been Professor of English at Princeton since 1986, where she focuses on subjects such as Romanticism in Britain and Jewish culture. Schor is a writer for several publications, including The Forward, The New York Times Book Review, and The Times Literary Supplement.

In 2006, Schor completed a biography of American poet Emma Lazarus, entitled Emma Lazarus; the book won the 2006 National Jewish Book Award in the American Jewish Category.

In 2016, Schor published Bridge of Words, a history of Esperanto as well as a personal memoir of her experience as an Esperantist. By the time of the book's release, Schor had been involved in the Esperanto movement for seven years, and had previously written articles and given a TEDxRoma talk entitled "The Transformative Vision of Esperanto" on the subject. The book received mixed reviews from literary critics, with reviewers praising the depth of the book's research and some writers criticising the inclusion of autobiographic content. It was well received by Esperanto scholars, with Federico Gobbo writing:

Schor's work is not a purely academic and scholarly work, even though the quantity and quality of the notes supporting the arguments is impressive. So, the book can be read like a novel. Moreover, Schor's language style is a real pleasure for the reader.

Schor has written two volumes of original poetry, including The Hills of Holland in 2002 and Strange Nursery in 2012. In 2022, Schor was awarded a Guggenheim Fellowship for her upcoming biography of American philosopher Horace Kallen, which she said would look at Kallen's use of the term "cultural pluralism".

== List of works ==
=== Non-fiction ===
- Schor, Esther; Hoy, Pat C.; DiYanni, Robert, eds. (1990). Women's voices: visions and perspectives. New York: McGraw-Hill. ISBN 978-0-07-557732-4.
- ——; Mellor, Anne K.; Fisch, Audrey (1993). The Other Mary Shelley: Beyond Frankenstein. Oxford University Press. ISBN 978-0-19-536023-3.
- —— (1994). Bearing the Dead: The British Culture of Mourning from the Enlightenment to Victoria. Princeton University Press. ISBN 978-1-4008-2148-8.
- —— (2003). Schor, Esther (ed.). The Cambridge Companion to Mary Shelley. Cambridge University Press. doi:10.1017/CCOL0521809843. ISBN 978-0-521-80984-9.
- —— (2006). Emma Lazarus. Knopf Doubleday Publishing Group. ISBN 978-0-8052-1166-5.
- —— (2016). Bridge of Words: Esperanto and the Dream of a Universal Language. Metropolitan. ISBN 978-0-8050-9079-6.

=== Poetry ===
- Schor, Esther (2002). The Hills of Holland: Poems. Archer Books. ISBN 978-1-931122-08-5.
- —— (2012). Strange Nursery: New and Selected Poems. Sheep Meadow Press.
