= Thomas Forbes Kelsall =

Thomas Forbes Kelsall (1799 – September 1872), was an English lawyer and literary figure.

Kelsall was born in Barbados, the son of a plantation owner.

Thomas Lovell Beddoes was sent to lodge with Kelsall in at 3 Houndwell Lane, Southampton before he went up to Oxford. Kelsall became very fond of Beddoes and corresponded with him all his life. He edited some of his published work, including the notable Death's Jest Book: or, The Fool's Tragedy, in 1850. He wrote the obituary of Beddoes that appeared in the Fortnightly Review, vol. 18, p. 75. Beddoes left all of his literary remains with Kelsall "to do as he saw fit". Kelsall's memoir of Beddoes, published in 1851 with the posthumous works, ostensibly remains the most insightful we have.

He married Frances Anne Harrison on 21 April 1829.

== Books published ==
- Beddoes, T. L. Death's Jest Book: or, The Fool's Tragedy, 1850
- Beddoes, T. L. Poems of the late Thomas Lovell Beddoes, 1851
- Beddoes, T. L. Poems, Posthumous and Collected, 1851

== See also ==
Thomas Lovell Beddoes Society website
