= The Triumph of Life =

Poem by Percy Bysshe Shelley

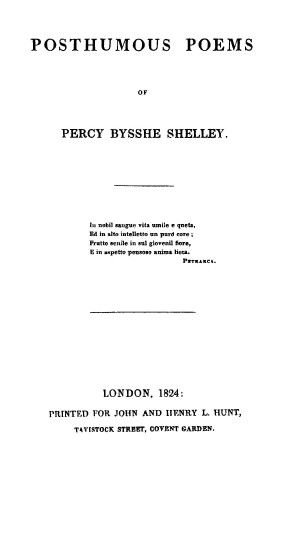
First appearance in Posthumous Poems, 1824.

The Triumph of Life was the last major work by Percy Bysshe Shelley before his death in 1822. The work was left unfinished. Shelley wrote the poem at Casa Magni in Lerici, Italy on the Gulf of La Spezia in the early summer of 1822. He modelled the poem, written in terza rima, on Petrarch's Trionfi and Dante's Divine Comedy.

Shelley was working on the poem when he accidentally drowned on 8 July 1822 during a storm on a voyage from Leghorn.

The poem was first published in the collection Posthumous Poems (1824) published in London by John and Henry L. Hunt which was edited by his wife Mary Shelley, who emphasised the importance of the work.

The theme of the poem is an exploration of the nature of being and reality. For Shelley, life itself, the "painted veil" which obscures and disguises the immortal spirit, is a more universal conqueror than love, death, fame, chastity, divinity, or time, and, in a dream vision, he sees this triumphal chariot pass, "on the storm of its own rushing splendour," over the captive multitude of men. Ultimately, natural life corrupts and triumphs over the spirit.

== Synopsis ==
The Triumph of Life consists of 548 lines in terza rima.

- Lines 1–40. Introduction: The narrator introduces himself, explains that his untold personal crisis must "remain untold", and describes the dream Vision.
- Lines 41–175. The visionary triumphal pageant is described.

- 41 The narrator describes a "stream of people" in the street.
- 54 Each person is described as deficient, limited, and obsessed.
- 67 They do not attend to nature.
- 77 He sees an icy glaring light approach, and a chariot bearing the hooded figure of Life.
- 94 The chariot is led by a blindfolded Janus figure, a Shadow.
- 110 The pageant is attended by a crowd of a million, like a Roman triumph.
- 128 There are also the sacred few who flee from the chariot.
- 137 There is wild dancing.
- 159 Some of them fall and the chariot passes over them.
- 164 The old men and women left behind, sink to corruption.

- Lines 176–295. Jean-Jacques Rousseau identifies figures and warns against inaction.

1822 fair draft. Bodleian Library.

- 176 Saddened, he notices an old root is alive; Rousseau in state of nature.
- 188 Rousseau is to tell the story of the procession.
- 200 He relates his own failure to avoid corruption.
- 208 He talks on those chained to the car: the wise and great who fail to know truth.
- 215 Napoleon Bonaparte is described.
- 235 Other rulers are described: anarchs, demagogues, sage.
- 254 The Greek philosopher Plato is described.
- 269 Francis Bacon is described.
- 274 Classical bards, the first Christian emperors are described.
- 292 They are leaders who ruled only to destroy.

- Lines 296–543. Rousseau's own story is related in allegories.

- 300 Rousseau begins to speak of his own plight.
- 305 The narrator should turn from spectator to actor.
- 308 Rousseau tells his story.
- 316 He describes the grove of forgetfulness.
- 331 This is the grove into which he was born.
- 352 He describes the shape: the bright but perhaps deadly light of knowing.
- 385 The dance of the shape effaces human thought, the memory of childhood.
- 398 Rousseau asks where he has come from.
- 404 He drinks from the cup of knowledge.
- 411 He is given a new vision, the shape fades, and his past with it.
- 434 He sees the chariot advancing with its captive crowd.
- 460 Rousseau is swept on with it.
- 480 The figures in the procession shed their shadows, with "Phantoms diffused around".
- 500 Death resumes the power of monarchs.
- 518 He sees the ageing of youth and beauty.
- 526 From each fall numerous shadows or masks.

Lines 544–548. "What is Life?" he asks.

== Themes ==
The work depicts a procession of life: A "stream of people" consisting of historical and contemporary personages, every one deformed or limited, who trail in tow a "chariot of Life" which symbolically signifies the pull or attractive force of physical existence which leads to degradation and corruption. Shelley sees this power as a tyrannical and oppressive one, which only a few can resist.

A certain collection of people, the "Sacred Few", made up of poets and philosophers, fight against the degradation of physical existence: "All but the sacred few who could not tame/Their spirits to the conquerors." The majority of people, however, accept the corruption of the world uncritically. But even poets and philosophers are unable to escape the ultimate triumph of life, the physical and material world.

The Guide in the procession is Swiss philosopher Jean-Jacques Rousseau who gives his warning about the dangers of being corrupted by the "chariot" using his own case as an example and cautionary tale.

The opening scene of a sunrise shows the tranquility and power of nature which is juxtaposed with the hectic and degraded events in the lives of mankind: "Of glory and of good, the Sun sprang forth."

The binary nature of existence is highlighted, a separation of light and dark, young and old. Human ideals and aspirations come to naught. Dedication and commitment waver. Truth is lost.

== Sources ==
- Arditi, Neil. "T. S. Eliot and 'The Triumph of Life'." Keats-Shelley Journal, Vol. 50, (2001), pp. 124–143.
- Bradley, A. C. "Notes on Shelley's 'Triumph of Life'." The Modern Language Review, Vol. 9, No. 4 (Oct. 1914), pp. 441–456.
- Baker, Carols, "Shelley: 'The Triumph of Life'," Master Poems of the English Language. Ed Oscar Williams New York Trident Press, 1966.
- Bloom, Harold "The Two spirits, Adonis and 'The Triumph of Life', Shelley; A collection of critical Essays. Ed. George M. Ridenowr. New Delhi, Prentice Hall of India 1980.
- Butter, P. H. "Sun and Shape in Shelley's 'The Triumph of Life'." Review of English Studies, Volume XIII, Issue 49, 1962, pp. 40–51.
- Chaudhary, Mukhtar. "Shelley's Pickings in 'The Triumph of Life' and 'Hellas'." Umm Al-Qura University Journal for Languages & Literature, January 2009.
- Dawson, P. M. S. "'The Mask of Darkness': Metaphor, Myth, and History in Shelley's 'The Triumph of Life.'" Behrendt, Stephen C. (ed.). History and Myth: Essays on English Romantic Literature. Detroit, MI: Wayne State UP, 1990. 235–44.
- Estermann, Barbara. "Shelley's Antimasques of Life: Re-visioning 'The Triumph'." ELH, Vol. 81, No. 4 (WINTER 2014), pp. 1193-1224.
- Faflak, Joel. "The Difficult Education of Shelley's" Triumph of Life"." Keats-Shelley Journal 58 (2009): 53-78.
- Gautam, G. L. "A Comparative Study of Shelley’s Triumph of Life and Stephen Gill’s The Flame." Online link.
- Ginsberg, Allen. Allen Ginsberg Class 19th Century Poetry, part 4 (22 October 1981). AG class on 19th Century Poetry, particularly Shelley's "Epipsychidion" and "Triumph of Life." Audiorecording on Naropa University Archive Project.
- Guthrie, Bernadette. "A Bridge Thrown Over the Stream of Time”:“The Triumph of Life” between the Divina Commedia and “Shelley Disfigured." Essays in Romanticism 23.2 (2016): 133-154.
- Hodgson, John A. "The World's Mysterious Doom: Shelley's The Triumph of Life." ELH, 42 (1975): 595–622.
- Matthews, G. M. "On Shelley's 'The Triumph of Life'," Studia Neophilologica, Volume 34, Issue 1, 1962, pp. 104–134.
- Miller, J. Hillis. "Shelley's ‘The Triumph of Life’." Shelley. Routledge, 2014, pp. 218-240.
- Milne, Fred L. "The Eclipsed Imagination in Shelley's 'The Triumph of Life.'" Studies in English Literature, 21 (1981): 681–702.
- Mooney, Jennifer. "The Fathers and the Power of Love: Allen Tate's Modern Triumph of Life." Border States: Journal of the Kentucky-Tennessee American Studies Association, No. 8 (1991).
- Pite, Ralph. "Shelley, Dante and The Triumph of Life." Evaluating Shelley (1996): 197-211.
- Quint, David. "Representation and Ideology in 'The Triumph of Life'." Studies in English Literature, 18 (1978): 639–57.
- Reiman, Donald Henry, ed. Shelley's 'The Triumph of Life': A Critical Study. Edited and with an introduction by Donald Henry Reiman. Urbana, IL: University of Illinois Press, 1965.
- Rieger, James. Review: Shelley's "The Triumph of Life": A Critical Study. Based on a Text Newly Edited from the Bodleian Manuscript by Donald H. Reiman. Keats-Shelley Journal, Vol. 15, (Winter, 1966), pp. 128–130.
- Sandy, Mark. "The Triumph of Life". The Literary Encyclopedia. First published 20 September 2002, accessed 25 October 2010.
- Shelley, Bryan. "The Interpreting Angel in 'The Triumph of Life'." Review of English Studies, (1988), XXXIX, 155: pp. 386–399.
- Shelley, Percy Bysshe.'The Triumph of Life', Master Poems of the English Language. Edited by Oscar Williams. New York Trident Press, 1966.
- Swaminathan, S. R. "Vedanta and Shelley's 'The Triumph of Life.'" Keats-Shelley Review, 9 (1995): 63–78.
- Todhunter, John. "Notes on Shelley's Unfinished Poem 'The Triumph of Life'." Printed for private circulation, 1887.
- Vassallo, Peter. "From Petrarch to Dante: The Discourse of Disenchantment in Shelley's The Triumph of Life." Journal of Anglo-Italian Studies 1 (1991): 102–10.
- Wang, Orrin N. C. "Disfiguring Monuments: History in Paul de Man's 'Shelley Disfigured' and Percy Bysshe Shelley's 'The Triumph of Life.'" ELH, 58.3 (1991): 633–55.
- Ward, A.W., et al., eds. The Cambridge history of English and American literature: An encyclopaedia in eighteen volumes, ed. by A.W. Ward, A.R. Waller, W.P. Trent, J. Erskine, S.P. Sherman, and C. Van Doren. NY: Putnam, 1907–1921.
- Weisman, Karen A. "Shelley's Triumph of Life over Fiction." Philological Quarterly, 71.3 (1992): 337–60.
