= Benjamin Colbert =

British-based American academic

Benjamin Colbert (born 1961) is a British-based American academic who is Reader in English at the University of Wolverhampton and an expert on historical travel writing. Educated at Tulane University, Oxford University and UCLA, he is the author of Shelley's Eye: Travel Writing and Aesthetic Vision (2003) and the editor of volume 3 of British Satire 1785–1840. He is the editor of the Database of British Travel Writing, 1780–1840.
