= 1819 in literature =

This article contains information about the literary events and publications of 1819.

== Events ==
- January 30 – The Romney Literary Society is established as the Polemic Society of Romney, West Virginia.
- April – John Keats begins his "Great Year" or "Living Year", during which he is at his most productive, having given up work at Guy's Hospital and moved into a new house, Wentworth Place, on Hampstead Heath on the edge of London. On April 3, Charles Wentworth Dilke lets his house, next door to Keats, to Mrs Brawne, whose daughter Fanny would become the love of Keats's life. Between April 21 and the end of May Keats writes La Belle Dame sans Merci and most of his major odes: Ode to Psyche, Ode on a Grecian Urn, Ode to a Nightingale, Ode on Indolence and Ode on Melancholy. In the summer he writes Lamia; on September 19 he writes his ode To Autumn at Winchester.On October 18, Keats proposes marriage to Fanny. Fanny who accepted. Though a significant event in their lives, they did their best to keep it secret.

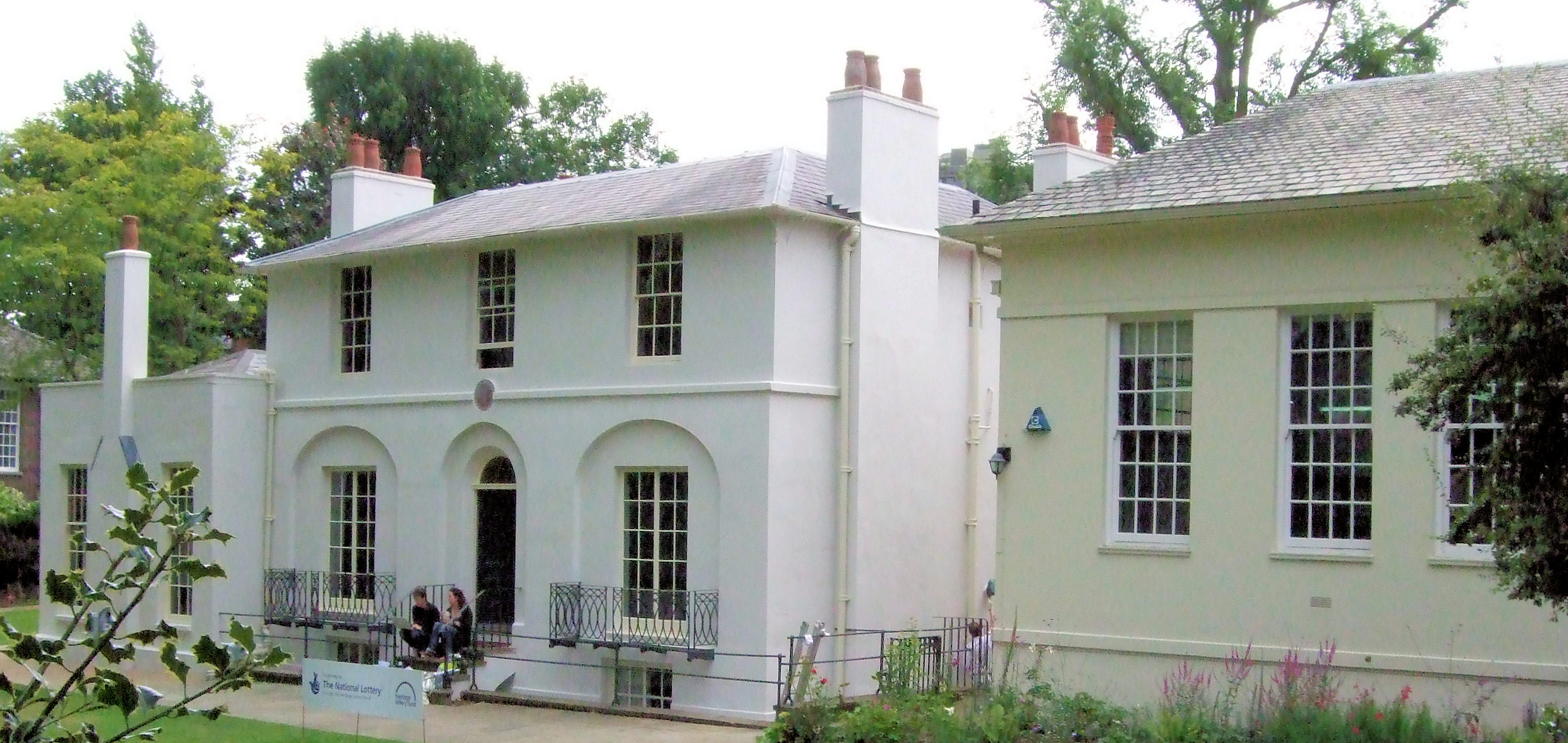
Keats' home during 1819

- April 1 – In London The New Monthly Magazine publishes John William Polidori's Gothic fiction The Vampyre, the first significant piece of prose vampire literature in English, attributing it to Lord Byron (who partly inspired it). The name of the work's protagonist, "Lord Ruthven", added to this assumption, for that name was originally used in Lady Caroline Lamb's novel Glenarvon (from the same publisher), in which a thinly-disguised Byron figure was named Clarence de Ruthven, Earl of Glenarvon. Despite repeated denials by Byron and Polidori, the authorship often went unclarified. In the following issue, dated May 1, 1819, Polidori wrote a letter to the editor explaining "that though the groundwork is certainly Lord Byron's, its development is mine". The tale was first published in book form by Sherwood, Neely, and Jones in Paternoster Row, London in 1819 in octavo as The Vampyre; A Tale in 84 pages. The notation on the cover noted that it was: "Entered at Stationers' Hall, March 27, 1819". Once again, the author was given as Lord Byron on the title page. After Polidori protested, later printings removed Byron's name from the title page but did not replace it with Polidori's. The story was an immediate popular success, partly because of the Byron attribution and partly because it exploited the predilections of the public for gothic horror. Polidori transformed the vampire from a character in folklore into the form that is recognized today—an aristocratic fiend who preys among high society.
- June 21 – Walter Scott's historical Waverley Novels The Bride of Lammermoor and A Legend of Montrose are published anonymously by Archibald Constable in Edinburgh as the 3rd series of Scott's Tales of My Landlord. They have been partly dictated due to Scott's suffering from biliary colic earlier in the year.
- June 23 – Washington Irving begins publishing The Sketch Book of Geoffrey Crayon, Gent. in seven installments — the first including "Rip Van Winkle" and a later one including "The Legend of Sleepy Hollow" — simultaneously in New York and London (where Irving is living at this time).
- August 16 – The Peterloo Massacre takes place in England, inspiring Percy Bysshe Shelley, in Italy, who, like Keats, has one of his most productive years. After hearing the news on September 5 he writes The Masque of Anarchy and sends it to a newspaper (although it is not published until 1832, after his death), also writing the political sonnet England in 1819 (published 1839), Ode to the West Wind (published 1820), The Cenci: A Tragedy, in Five Acts (printed in Italy, but not first performed publicly until 1922) and Julian and Maddalo (published in his Posthumous Poems of 1824) and beginning his prose work A Philosophical View of Reform.
- September 20 – The Carlsbad Decrees are issued throughout the German Confederation, suppressing liberal and nationalist views and censoring the press.
- October – In Britain, Richard Carlile is convicted of blasphemy and sent to prison for publishing The Age of Reason by Thomas Paine.
- December 20 – Walter Scott's popular Waverley Novel Ivanhoe is published anonymously in 3 volumes by Archibald Constable in Edinburgh, dated 1820. A chivalric romance set in 12th-century England, it represents a move away from Scott setting his fiction in Scotland.
- unknown dates
  - Joseph Perl's epistolary novel Megalleh Temirim ("Revealer of Secrets"), written under the name "Obadiah ben Pethahiah" and published in Vienna, becomes the first novel to be published in the Hebrew language.
  - The publisher Collins is founded as a printer of religious literature in Glasgow by William Collins.
  - W. & R. Chambers, established by bookseller brothers William Chambers and Robert Chambers in Edinburgh, begin publishing with a posthumous collection of The Songs of Robert Burns.

== New books ==
=== Fiction ===
- Ann Hatton – The Oath of Vengeance
- Thomas Hope – Anastasius
- Washington Irving – The Sketch Book of Geoffrey Crayon, Gent.
- E. T. A. Hoffmann
  - Das Fräulein von Scuderi: Erzählung aus dem Zeitalter Ludwig des Vierzehnten (novella published in Taschenbuch für das Jahr 1820)
  - The Life and Opinions of the Tomcat Murr with a Fragmentary Biography of the Music Director Johannes Kreisler on Random Sheets of Waste Paper (Lebens-Ansichten des Katers Murr nebst fragmentarischer Biographie des Kapellmeisters Johannes Kreisler in zufälligen Makulaturblättern) (begins publication)
- Joseph Perl – Megalleh Temirim
- John William Polidori – The Vampyre
- Walter Scott (anonymously)
  - The Bride of Lammermoor
  - A Legend of Montrose
  - Ivanhoe

=== Children ===
- Maria Hack – Grecian Stories
- Washington Irving – "Rip Van Winkle" (short story)

=== Drama ===
- William Abbot – Swedish Patriotism
- Jacques-François Ancelot – Louis IX
- József Katona – Bánk bán
- Alessandro Manzoni – Il Conte di Carmagnola
- Charles Maturin – Fredolfo
- John Neal – Otho: A Tragedy, in Five Acts
- Richard Sheil – Evadne
- Percy Bysshe Shelley – The Cenci, a Tragedy, in Five Acts

=== Poetry ===
- Lord Byron
  - Mazeppa, with "Fragment of a Novel" as a supplement
  - Don Juan, Cantos I–II (anonymously)
- Thomas Campbell – Specimens of the British Poets
- Barry Cornwall – Dramatic Scenes and other Poems
- Marceline Desbordes-Valmore – Élégies et romances
- Johann Wolfgang von Goethe – West-östlicher Divan (West-Eastern Diwan)
- John Keats
  - La Belle Dame sans Merci
  - Odes (including "Ode to Psyche", "Ode on a Grecian Urn", "Ode to a Nightingale", "Ode on Melancholy" and "To Autumn")
- John Neal – The Battle of Niagara: Second Edition, Enlarged, with Other Poems
- Percy Bysshe Shelley
  - The Cenci, a Tragedy, in Five Acts
  - Ode to the West Wind
  - The Masque of Anarchy (published 1832)
  - Men of England
  - England in 1819
  - The Witch of Atlas
  - Julian and Maddalo

=== Non-fiction ===
- Abbé Faria – Da Causa do Sono Lúcido no Estudo da Natureza do Homem (De la Cause de Sommeil lucide)
- Jakob Grimm – German Grammar
- Georg Hermes – Philosophical Introduction to Christian Theology
- Louisa Gurney Hoare – Hints for the Improvement of Early Education and Nursery Discipline
- Richard Colt Hoare – A Classical Tour through Italy and Sicily
- John Lingard – The History of England, From the First Invasion by the Romans to the Accession of Henry VIII (8 volumes)
- Arthur Schopenhauer – The World as Will and Representation
- Percy Bysshe Shelley – A Philosophical View of Reform (published 1920)

== Births ==
- January 1 – Arthur Hugh Clough, English poet (died 1861)
- January 21 – Edward Capern, English postman poet (died 1894)
- January 22 – Giovanni Battista Cavalcaselle, Italian writer and art critic (died 1897)
- February 22 – James Russell Lowell, American poet (died 1891)
- April 14 – Harriett Ellen Grannis Arey, co-founder and first president, Ohio Woman's State Press Association (died 1901)
- April 23 – Bernard Quaritch, German-born English philologist and bookseller (died 1899)
- May 27 – Julia Ward Howe, American poet and abolitionist (died 1910)
- May 31 – Walt Whitman, American poet (died 1892)
- June 12 – Charles Kingsley, English novelist and cleric (died 1875)
- July 4 – Marie Sophie Schwartz, Swedish novelist (died 1894)
- July 11 – Susan Warner (pseudonym Elizabeth Weatherell), American religious and children's writer (died 1885)
- July 19 – Gottfried Keller, Swiss novelist (died 1890)
- July 24 – Josiah Gilbert Holland, American novelist and poet (died 1881)
- August 1 – Herman Melville, American novelist (died 1891)
- November 22 – George Eliot (Mary Ann Evans), English novelist, poet and journalist (died 1880)
- December 26 – E. D. E. N. Southworth, American writer (died 1899)
- December 30 – Theodor Fontane, German novelist (died 1898)
- Unknown dates
  - Butrus al-Bustani, Lebanese writer (died 1883)
  - Harriet Anne Scott, Scottish novelist (died 1894)

== Deaths ==
- January 8 – Valentin Vodnik, Carniolan Slovene poet, writer and priest (born 1758)
- January 12
  - André Morellet, French economist and philosopher (born 1727)
  - Benedikte Naubert, German historical novelist (born 1752)
- February 12 – Juan Ramis, Spanish historian (born 1746)
- March 23
  - August von Kotzebue, German dramatist (born 1761)
  - Jean-Antoine-Marie Monperlier, French poet and dramatist (born 1788)
- April 17 – William Holland, English diarist (born 1746)
- October 30 – John Bowles, English political writer and lawyer (born 1751)
- November 2 – Théodore-Pierre Bertin, French writer and pioneer of shorthand (born 1751)
- November 23 – Quintin Craufurd, Scottish historian (born 1743)
- Unknown dates
  - Abu Rumi, Ethiopian translator of the Bible into Amharic (born c. 1750)
  - Wang Yun, Chinese poet and playwright (born 1749)

== Awards ==
- Chancellor's Gold Medal for Poetry – Thomas Babington Macaulay, 1st Baron Macaulay
- Newdigate Prize – H. J. Urquhart

== Sources ==
- Motion, Andrew. Keats. London: Faber and Faber, 1997. Print.
