= The Calendar of Nature =

1819 series of articles by Leigh Hunt

The Calendar of Nature is a series of articles by Leigh Hunt about aspects of various months and seasons published throughout 1819 in the Examiner. It is also included in his Literary Pocket-Book and published on its own as The Months. The work places emphasis on the season of autumn as a time for justice and prosperity, and influenced John Keats's poem "To Autumn". The emphasis on both works is on a temperate landscape and the positive political aspects of living in such a place. The work also stresses the sickness that is connected to a temperate landscape, which is related to the physical problems that Keats was suffering from at the time.

== Background ==
In 1819, Hunt's The Calendar of Nature was printed in his periodical the Examiner. The poem describes the artistic connections to each of the months, descriptions of festivals, and a discussion about nature. Hunt also included the calendar in his collection the Literary Pocket-Book, a combination of poems and other material by Hunt and others. The work was first printed in January 1819, and, by 1823, there were five collections under the title. The work was later published in 1821 under the title The Months. The 1821 edition contained a preface which declared, "The good-nature with which this Calendar was received on its appearance in 1819 ... has induced its republication in a separate form, with considerable additions". The 1821 edition also included the final two stanzas of John Keats's poem "To Autumn" with the claim that "A living poet has happily personified autumn in some of the pleasantest shapes under which her servants appear".

== Months ==
The work quotes Percy Bysshe Shelley and discusses the works of Edmund Spenser. The calendar also refers to Shelley regarding autumn when it states: "The poet still takes advantage of the exuberance of harvest and the sign of the Zodiac in this month, to read us a lesson on justice". For September and autumn, Hunt connected the harvest and the month's zodiac symbol, Libra, in order to discuss justice. In particular, he said that autumn had "a certain festive abundance for the supply of all creation". Additionally, Hunt brings up Shelley's poems Convito and The Revolt of Islam in order to discuss autumn, abundance of crops, and revolution. The plenty that comes from the time period is supposed to bring peace to warring people.

Hunt also describes the natural events that take place during autumn: "This is the month of the migration of birds, of the finished harvest, of nut-gathering, of cyder and merry-making, and, towards the conclusion, of the change of colour in trees. The swallows, and many other soft-billed birds that feed on insects, disappear for the warmer climates, leaving behind only a few stragglers, probably from weakness or sickness, who hide themselves in caverns and other sheltered places, and occasionally appear upon warm days."

== Themes ==
September, for instance, was used to promote the ideas of the commonwealth along with Hunt's views on Justice. The specific discussion on September came between a discussion of the Peterloo Massacre and a discussion of people on trial for sedition. Hunt wished to promote peace and liberty, with a direct connection to nature. This view influenced Keats's "To Autumn", with its emphasis on "Merry Old England" and the reaction against the political violence of the time. The works are similar in that they emphasize the same images, such as the animals and activities found during autumn. When Hunt republished parts of Keats's poem, he added an emphasis on justice through association with Hunt's own claims about autumn.

Keats, like Hunt, emphasized a temperate landscape in his works. Hunt's description of autumn suggests vitality, though he also describes sickness. In turn, he is commenting on the dietary habits and other aspects of the land. It is possible that the temperate landscape is in opposition to the tropical, and that the political implications are that tropical countries are less free while temperate ones are more so. As such, the extremes in the tropical climate reflect the political extremes that cause problems. The descriptions of temperate climates are also connected to medical aspects of British life, possibly representing various illnesses that befall people during autumn. People like Keats sought other climates in order to try to overcome their sicknesses. However, Keats and Hunt reveal a preference for the British landscape, and this influenced the construction of "To Autumn".
