= To Autumn =

1819 poem by John Keats

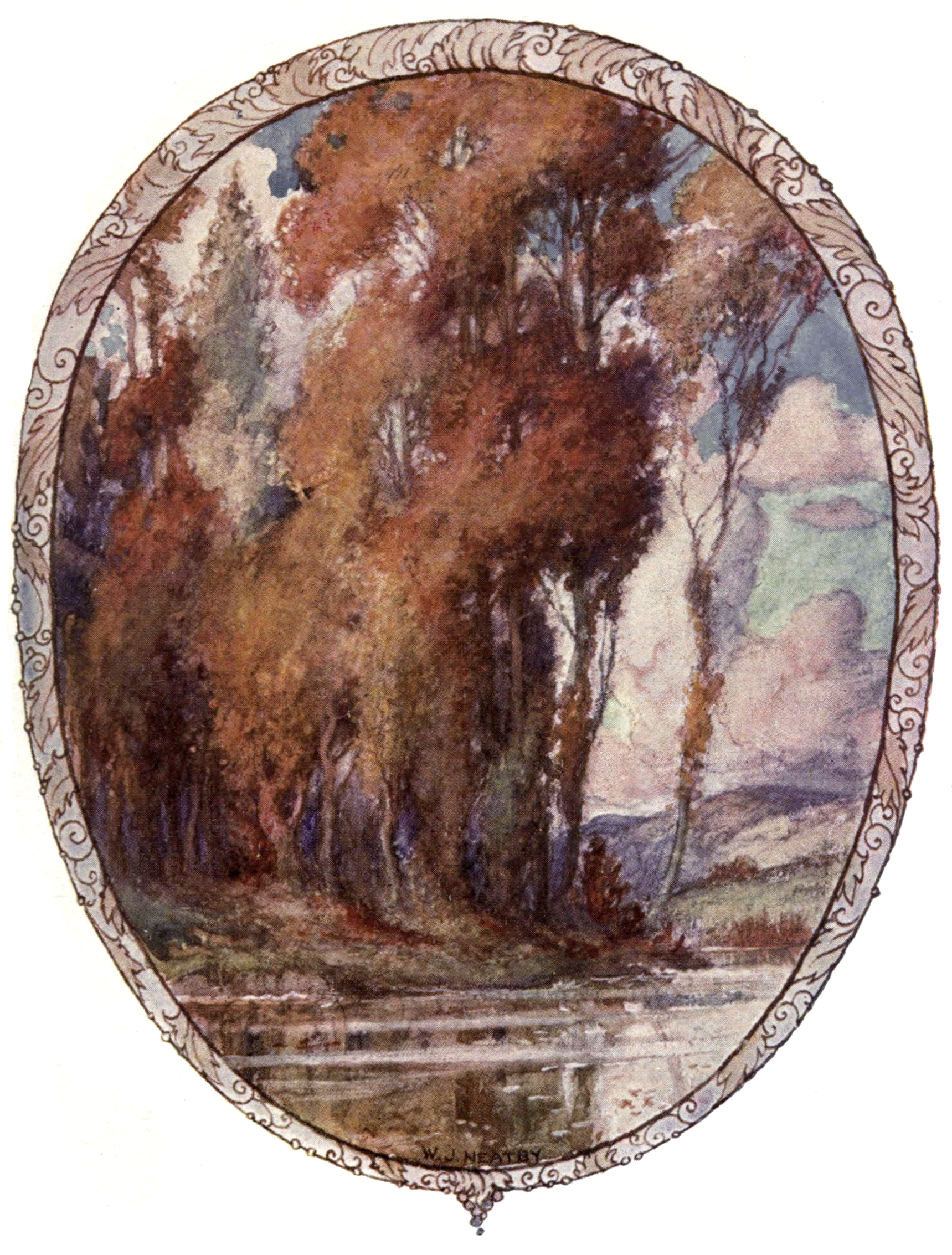
Illustration for "To Autumn" by William James Neatby, from A Day with Keats, 1899

"To Autumn" is a poem by English Romantic poet John Keats (31 October 1795 – 23 February 1821). The work was composed on 19 September 1819 and published in 1820 in a volume of Keats's poetry that included Lamia and The Eve of St. Agnes. "To Autumn" is the final work in a group of poems known as Keats's "1819 odes". Although personal problems left him little time to devote to poetry in 1819, he composed "To Autumn" after a walk near Winchester one autumnal evening. The work marks the end of his poetic career, as he needed to earn money and could no longer devote himself to the lifestyle of a poet. A little over a year after the publication of "To Autumn", Keats died in Rome.

The poem has three eleven-line stanzas which describe a progression through the season, from the late maturation of the crops to the harvest and to the last days of autumn when winter is nearing. The imagery is richly achieved through the personification of Autumn, and the description of its bounty, its sights and sounds. It has parallels in the work of English landscape artists, with Keats himself describing the fields of stubble that he saw on his walk as conveying the warmth of "some pictures".

The work has been interpreted as a meditation on death; as an allegory of artistic creation; as Keats's response to the Peterloo Massacre, which took place in the same year; and as an expression of nationalist sentiment. One of the most anthologised English lyric poems, "To Autumn" has been regarded by critics as one of the most perfect short poems in the English language.

== Background ==
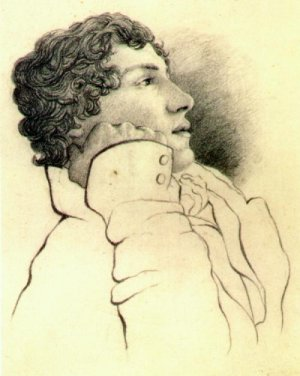
Sketch of Keats by Charles Brown, August 1819, one month before the composition of "To Autumn"

During the spring of 1819, Keats wrote many of his major odes: "Ode on a Grecian Urn", "Ode on Indolence", "Ode on Melancholy", "Ode to a Nightingale", and "Ode to Psyche". After the month of May, he began to pursue other forms of poetry, including the verse tragedy Otho the Great in collaboration with friend and roommate Charles Brown, the second half of Lamia, and a return to his unfinished epic Hyperion. His efforts from spring until autumn were dedicated completely to a career in poetry, alternating between writing long and short poems, and setting himself a goal to compose more than fifty lines of verse each day. In his free time he also read works as varied as Robert Burton's The Anatomy of Melancholy, Thomas Chatterton's poetry, and Leigh Hunt's essays.

Although Keats managed to write many poems in 1819, he was suffering from a multitude of financial troubles throughout the year, including concerns over his brother, George, who, after emigrating to America, was badly in need of money. Despite these distractions, on 19 September 1819 he found time to write "To Autumn". The poem marks the final moment of his career as a poet. No longer able to afford to devote his time to the composition of poems, he began working on more lucrative projects. Keats's declining health and personal responsibilities also raised obstacles to his continuing poetic efforts.

On 19 September 1819, Keats walked near Winchester, in Hampshire along the River Itchen. In a letter to his friend John Hamilton Reynolds written on 21 September, Keats described the impression the scene had made upon him and its influence on the composition of "To Autumn": "How beautiful the season is now – How fine the air. A temperate sharpness about it [...] I never lik'd stubble fields so much as now [...] Somehow a stubble plain looks warm – in the same way that some pictures look warm – this struck me so much in my sunday's walk that I composed upon it." Not everything on Keats's mind at the time was bright; the poet knew in September that he would have to finally abandon Hyperion. Thus, in the letter that he wrote to Reynolds, Keats also included a note saying that he abandoned his long poem. Keats did not send "To Autumn" to Reynolds, but did include the poem within a letter to Richard Woodhouse, his publisher and friend, and dated it on the same day.

The poem was revised and included in Keats's 1820 collection of poetry titled Lamia, Isabella, the Eve of St. Agnes, and Other Poems. Although the publishers Taylor and Hessey feared the kind of bad reviews that had plagued Keats's 1818 edition of Endymion, they were willing to publish the collection after the removal of any potentially controversial poems to ensure that there would be no politically motivated reviews that could give the volume a bad reputation.

== Poem ==
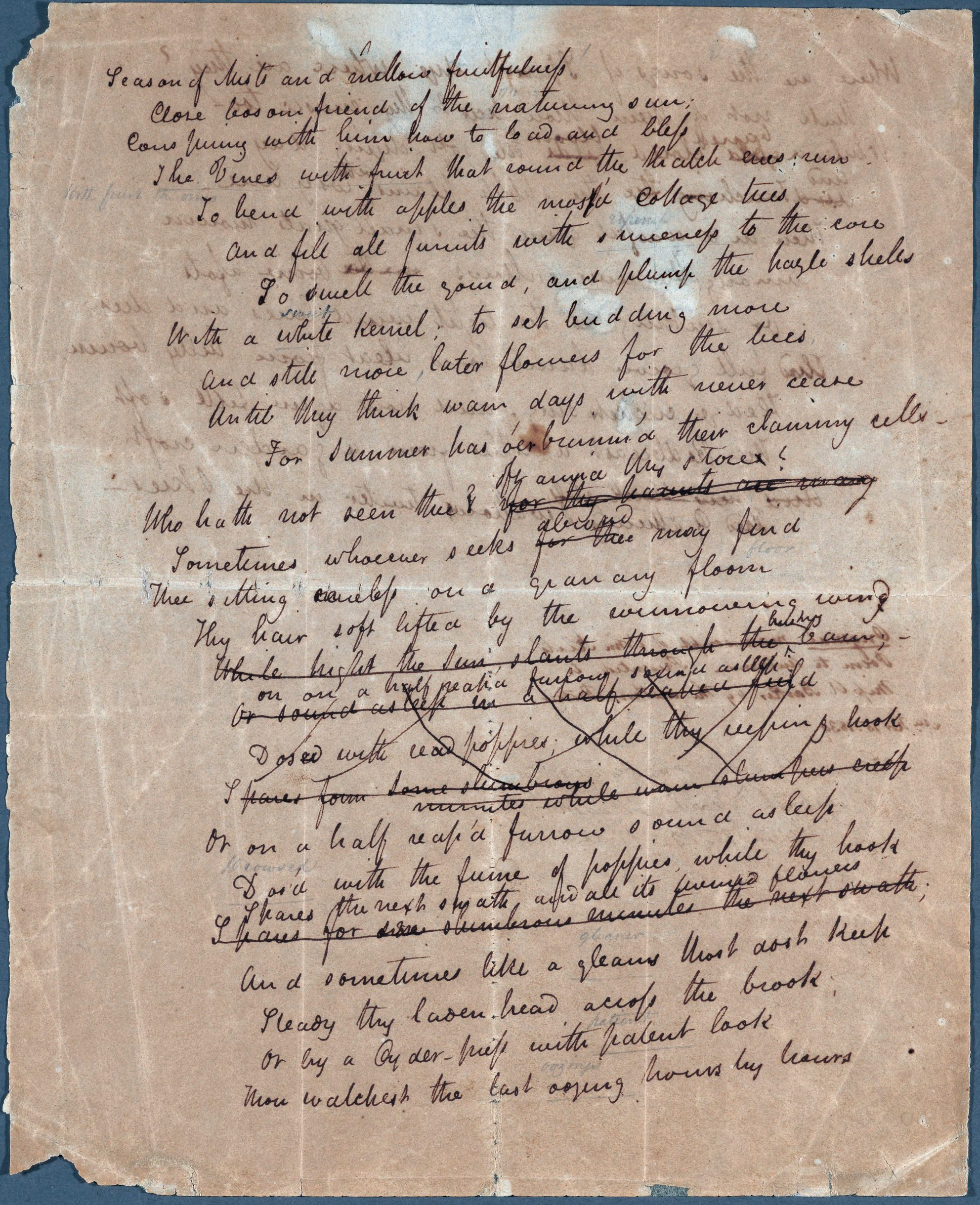
Manuscript copy of "To Autumn" page 1

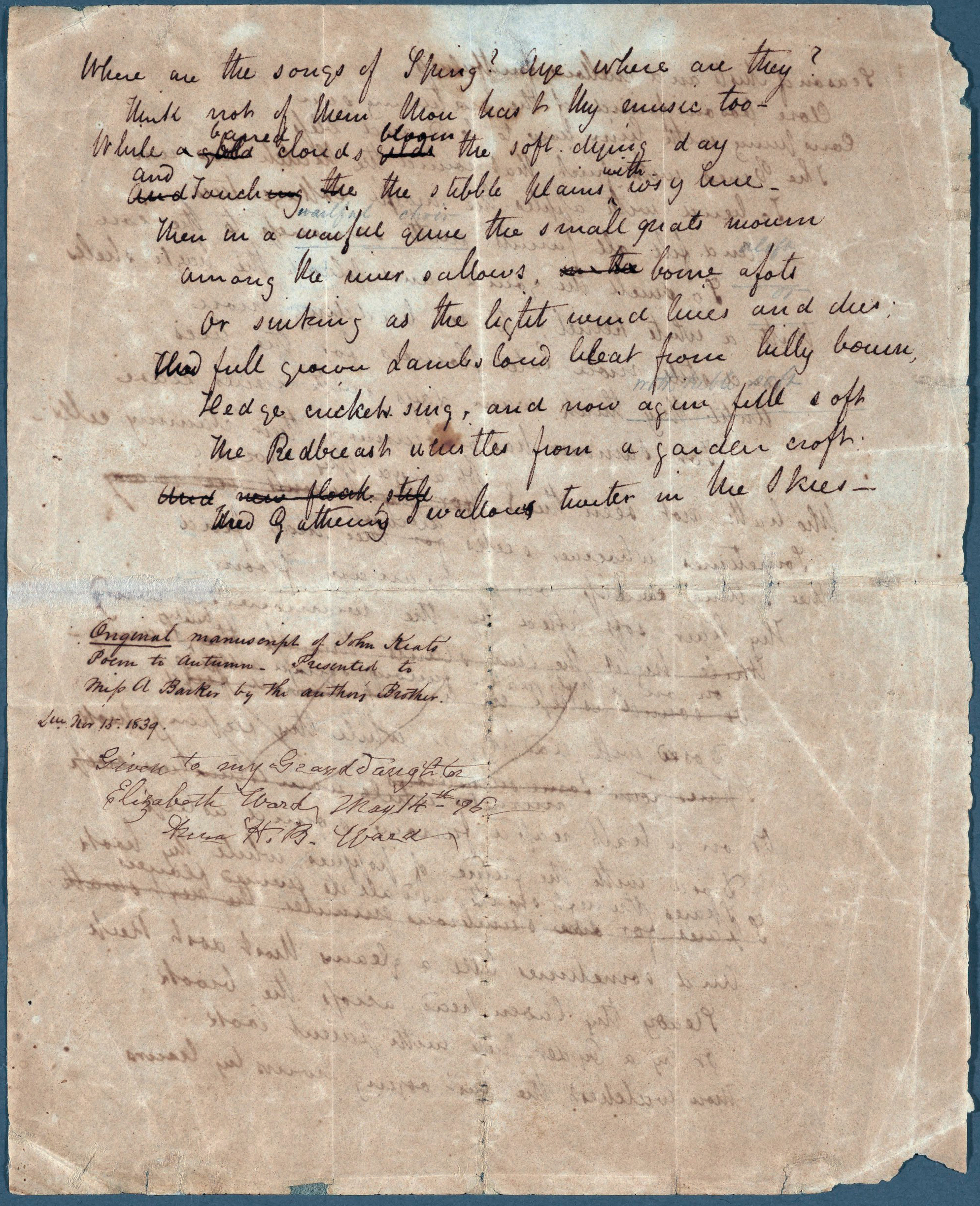
Manuscript copy of "To Autumn" page 2

Season of mists and mellow fruitfulness,
Close bosom-friend of the maturing sun;
Conspiring with him how to load and bless
With fruit the vines that round the thatch-eves run;
To bend with apples the moss'd cottage-trees,
And fill all fruit with ripeness to the core;
To swell the gourd, and plump the hazel shells
With a sweet kernel; to set budding more,
And still more, later flowers for the bees,
Until they think warm days will never cease,
For Summer has o'er-brimm'd their clammy cells.

Who hath not seen thee oft amid thy store?
Sometimes whoever seeks abroad may find
Thee sitting careless on a granary floor,
Thy hair soft-lifted by the winnowing wind;
Or on a half-reap'd furrow sound asleep,
Drows'd with the fume of poppies, while thy hook
Spares the next swath and all its twined flowers:
And sometimes like a gleaner thou dost keep
Steady thy laden head across a brook;
Or by a cyder-press, with patient look,
Thou watchest the last oozings hours by hours.

Where are the songs of Spring? Ay, where are they?
Think not of them, thou hast thy music too,—
While barred clouds bloom the soft-dying day,
And touch the stubble-plains with rosy hue;
Then in a wailful choir the small gnats mourn
Among the river sallows, borne aloft
Or sinking as the light wind lives or dies;
And full-grown lambs loud bleat from hilly bourn;
Hedge-crickets sing; and now with treble soft
The red-breast whistles from a garden-croft;
And gathering swallows twitter in the skies.

== Themes ==
"To Autumn" describes, in its three stanzas, three different aspects of the season: its fruitfulness, its labour, and its ultimate decline. Through the stanzas there is a progression from early autumn to mid autumn and then to the heralding of winter. Parallel to this, the poem depicts the day turning from morning to afternoon and into dusk. These progressions are joined with a shift from the tactile sense to that of sight and then of sound, creating a three-part symmetry which is not present in Keats's other odes.

As the poem progresses, Autumn is represented metaphorically as one who conspires, who ripens fruit, who harvests, who makes music. The first stanza of the poem represents Autumn as involved with the promotion of natural processes, growth and ultimate maturation, two forces in opposition in nature, but together creating the impression that the season will not end. In this stanza the fruits are still ripening and the buds still opening in the warm weather. Stuart Sperry says that Keats emphasises the tactile sense here, suggested by the imagery of growth and gentle motion: swelling, bending and plumping.

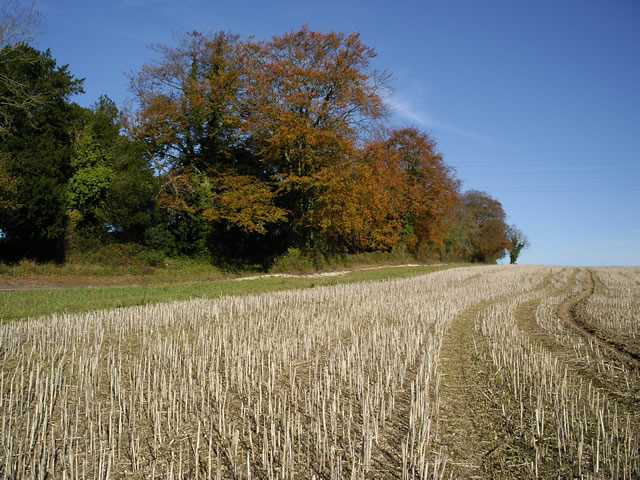
Harvested field, Hampshire

In the second stanza, Autumn is personified as a harvester, to be seen by the viewer in various guises performing labouring tasks essential to the provision of food for the coming year. There is a lack of definitive action, all motion being gentle. Autumn is not depicted as actually harvesting but as seated, resting or watching. In lines 14–15 the personification of Autumn is as an exhausted labourer. Near the end of the stanza, the steadiness of the gleaner in lines 19–20 again emphasises a motionlessness within the poem. The progression through the day is revealed in actions that are all suggestive of the drowsiness of afternoon: the harvested grain is being winnowed, the harvester is asleep or returning home, the last drops issue from the cider press.

The last stanza contrasts Autumn's sounds with those of Spring. The sounds that are presented are not only those of Autumn but essentially the gentle sounds of the evening. Gnats wail and lambs bleat in the dusk. As night approaches within the final moments of the song, death is slowly approaching alongside the end of the year. The full-grown lambs, like the grapes, gourds and hazelnuts, will be harvested for the winter. The twittering swallows gather for departure, leaving the fields bare. The whistling red-breast and the chirping cricket are the common sounds of winter. The references to Spring, the growing lambs and the migrating swallows remind the reader that the seasons are a cycle, widening the scope of this stanza from a single season to life in general.

Of all of Keats's poems, "To Autumn", with its catalogue of concrete images, most closely describes a paradise as realized on earth while also focusing on archetypal symbols connected with the season. Within the poem, autumn represents growth, maturation and finally an approaching death. There is a fulfilling union between the ideal and the real.

Scholars have noted a number of literary influences on "To Autumn", from Virgil's Georgics, to Edmund Spenser's "Mutability Cantos", to the language of Thomas Chatterton, to Samuel Taylor Coleridge's "Frost at Midnight", to an essay on autumn by Leigh Hunt, which Keats had recently read.

"To Autumn" is thematically connected to other odes that Keats wrote in 1819. For example, in his "Ode on Melancholy" a major theme is the acceptance of the process of life. When this theme appears later in "To Autumn", however, it is with a difference. This time the figure of the poet disappears, and there is no exhortation of an imaginary reader. There are no open conflicts, and "dramatic debate, protest, and qualification are absent". In process there is a harmony between the finality of death and hints of renewal of life in the cycle of the seasons, paralleled by the renewal of a single day.

Critics have tended to emphasize different aspects of the process. Some have focused on renewal; Walter Jackson Bate points to the theme of each stanza including "its contrary" idea, here death implying, though only indirectly, the renewal of life. Also, noted by both Bate and Jennifer Wagner, the structure of the verse reinforces the sense of something to come; the placing of the couplet before the end of each stanza creates a feeling of suspension, highlighting the theme of continuation.

Others, like Harold Bloom, have emphasized the "exhausted landscape", the completion, the finality of death, although "Winter descends here as a man might hope to die, with a natural sweetness". If death in itself is final, here it comes with a lightness, a softness, also pointing to "an acceptance of process beyond the possibility of grief." The progress of growth is no longer necessary; maturation is complete, and life and death are in harmony. The rich description of the cycle of the seasons enables the reader to feel a belonging "to something larger than the self", as James O'Rourke expresses it, but the cycle comes to an end each year, analogous to the ending of single life. O'Rourke suggests that something of a fear of that ending is subtly implied at the end of the poem, although, unlike the other great odes, in this poem the person of the poet is entirely submerged, so there is at most a faint hint of Keats's own possible fear.

According to Helen Vendler, "To Autumn" may be seen as an allegory of artistic creation. As the farmer processes the fruits of the soil into what sustains the human body, so the artist processes the experience of life into a symbolic structure that may sustain the human spirit. This process involves an element of self-sacrifice by the artist, analogous to the living grain's being sacrificed for human consumption. In "To Autumn", as a result of this process, the "rhythms" of the harvesting "artist-goddess" "permeate the whole world until all visual, tactile, and kinetic presence is transubstantiated into Apollonian music for the ear," the sounds of the poem itself.

In a 1979 essay, Jerome McGann argued that while the poem was indirectly influenced by historical events, Keats had deliberately ignored the political landscape of 1819. Countering this view, Andrew Bennett, Nicholas Roe and others focused on what they believed were political allusions actually present in the poem, Roe arguing for a direct connection to the Peterloo Massacre of 1819. Later, Paul Fry argued against McGann's stance when he pointed out, "It scarcely seems pertinent to say that 'To Autumn' is therefore an evasion of social violence when it is so clearly an encounter with death itself [...] it is not a politically encoded escape from history reflecting the coerced betrayal [...] of its author's radicalism. McGann thinks to rescue Keats from the imputation of political naïveté by saying that he was a radical browbeaten into quietism".

In his 1999 study of the effect on British literature of the diseases and climates of the colonies, Alan Bewell read "the landscape of 'To Autumn'" as "a kind of biomedical allegory of the coming into being of English climatic space out of its dangerous geographical alternatives." Britain's colonial reach over the previous century and a half had exposed the mother country to foreign diseases and awareness of the dangers of extreme tropical climates. Keats, with medical training, having suffered chronic illness himself, and influenced like his contemporaries by "colonial medical discourse", was deeply aware of this threat.

According to Bewell, the landscape of "To Autumn" presents the temperate climate of rural England as a healthful alternative to disease-ridden foreign environments. Though the "clammy" aspect of "fever", the excessive ripeness associated with tropical climates, intrude into the poem, these elements, less prominent than in Keats's earlier poetry, are counterbalanced by the dry, crisp autumnal air of rural England. In presenting the particularly English elements of this environment, Keats was also influenced by contemporary poet and essayist Leigh Hunt, who had recently written of the arrival of autumn with its "migration of birds", "finished harvest", "cyder [...] making" and migration of "the swallows", as well as by English landscape painting and the "pure" English idiom of the poetry of Thomas Chatterton.

In "To Autumn", Bewell argues, Keats was at once voicing "a very personal expression of desire for health" and constructing a "myth of a national environment". This "political" element in the poem, Bewell points out, has also been suggested by Geoffrey Hartman, who expounded a view of "To Autumn" as "an ideological poem whose form expresses a national idea".

Thomas McFarland, on the other hand, in 2000 cautioned against overemphasizing the "political, social, or historical readings" of the poem, which distract from its "consummate surface and bloom". Most important about "To Autumn" is its concentration of imagery and allusion in its evocation of nature, conveying an "interpenetration of livingness and dyingness as contained in the very nature of autumn".

In 2012 a specific probable location of the cornfield that inspired Keats was discussed in an article by Richard Marggraf Turley, Jayne Archer and Howard Thomas, which draws upon new archival evidence. Traditionally, the water-meadows south of Winchester, along which Keats took daily leisurely walks, were assumed to have provided the sights and sounds of his ode. Marggraf Turley, Archer and Thomas argue that the ode was more directly inspired by Keats's visit to St Giles's Hill—site of a new cornfield—at the eastern extremity of the city. The land, previously a copse, had recently been turned over to wheat to take advantage of high bread prices. This new topography, the authors argue, enables us to see hitherto unsuspected dimensions to Keats's engagement with contemporary politics, in particular as they pertained to the management of food production and supply, wages and productivity.

== Structure ==
"To Autumn" is a poem of three stanzas, each of eleven lines. Like others of Keats's odes written in 1819, the structure is that of an odal hymn, having three clearly defined sections corresponding to the Classical divisions of strophe, antistrophe, and epode. The stanzas differ from those of the other odes through use of eleven lines rather than ten, and have a couplet placed before the concluding line of each stanza.

"To Autumn" employs poetical techniques which Keats had perfected in the five poems written in the Spring of the same year, but departs from them in some aspects, dispensing with the narrator and dealing with more concrete concepts. There is no dramatic movement in "To Autumn" as there is in many earlier poems; the poem progresses in its focus while showing little change in the objects it is focusing on. There is, in the words of Walter Jackson Bate, "a union of process and stasis", "energy caught in repose", an effect that Keats himself termed "stationing". At the beginning of the third stanza he employs the dramatic Ubi sunt device associated with a sense of melancholy, and questions the personified subject: "Where are the songs of Spring?"

Like the other odes, "To Autumn" is written in iambic pentameter (but greatly modified from the very beginning) with five stressed syllables to a line, each usually preceded by an unstressed syllable. Keats varies this form by the employment of Augustan inversion, sometimes using a stressed syllable followed by an unstressed syllable at the beginning of a line, including the first: "Season of mists and mellow fruitfulness"; and employing spondees in which two stressed syllables are placed together at the beginnings of both the following stanzas, adding emphasis to the questions that are asked: "Who hath not seen thee...", "Where are the songs...?"

The rhyme of "To Autumn" follows a pattern of starting each stanza with an ABAB pattern which is followed by rhyme scheme of CDEDCCE in the first verse and CDECDDE in the second and third stanzas. In each case, there is a couplet before the final line. Some of the language of "To Autumn" resembles phrases found in earlier poems with similarities to Endymion, Sleep and Poetry, and Calidore. Keats characteristically uses monosyllabic words such as "...how to load and bless with fruit the vines that round the thatch-eves run." The words are weighted by the emphasis of bilabial consonants (b, m, p), with lines like "...for Summer has o'er-brimm'd their clammy cells." There is also an emphasis on long vowels which control the flow of the poem, giving it a slow measured pace: "...while barred clouds bloom the soft dying day".

Between the manuscript version and the published version of "To Autumn" Keats tightened the language of the poem. One of Keats's changes emphasised by critics is the change in line 17 of "Drows'd with red poppies" to "Drows'd with the fume of poppies", which emphasises the sense of smell instead of sight. The later edition relies more on passive, past participles, as apparent in the change of "While a gold cloud" in line 25 to "While barred clouds". Other changes involve the strengthening of phrases, especially within the transformation of the phrase in line 13 "whoever seeks for thee may find" into "whoever seeks abroad may find". Many of the lines within the second stanza were completely rewritten, especially those which did not fit into a rhyme scheme. Some of the minor changes involved adding punctuation missing from the original manuscript copy and altering capitalisation.

== Critical reception ==
Critical and scholarly praise has been unanimous in declaring "To Autumn" one of the most perfect poems in the English language. A.C. Swinburne placed it with "Ode on a Grecian Urn" as "the nearest to absolute perfection" of Keats's odes; Aileen Ward declared it "Keats's most perfect and untroubled poem"; and Douglas Bush has stated that the poem is "flawless in structure, texture, tone, and rhythm"; Walter Evert, in 1965, stated that "To Autumn" is "the only perfect poem that Keats ever wrote – and if this should seem to take from him some measure of credit for his extraordinary enrichment of the English poetic tradition, I would quickly add that I am thinking of absolute perfection in whole poems, in which every part is wholly relevant to and consistent in effect with every other part."

Early reviews of "To Autumn" focused on it as part of Keats's collection of poems Lamia, Isabella, the Eve of St. Agnes, and Other Poems. An anonymous critic in the July 1820 Monthly Review claimed, "this writer is very rich both in imagination and fancy; and even a superabundance of the latter faculty is displayed in his lines 'On Autumn,' which bring the reality of nature more before our eyes than almost any description that we remember. [...] If we did not fear that, young as is Mr K., his peculiarities are fixed beyond all the power of criticism to remove, we would exhort him to become somewhat less strikingly original,—to be less fond of the folly of too new or too old phrases,—and to believe that poetry does not consist in either the one or the other." Josiah Conder in the September 1820 Eclectic Review mentioned, "One naturally turns first to the shorter pieces, in order to taste the flavour of the poetry. The following ode to Autumn is no unfavourable specimen." An anonymous reviewer in The Edinburgh Magazine for October 1820 added to a discussion of some of Keats's longer poems the afterthought that "The ode to 'Fancy,' and the ode to 'Autumn,' also have great merit."

Although, after Keats's death, recognition of the merits of his poetry came slowly, by mid century, despite widespread Victorian disapproval of the alleged "weakness" of his character and the view often advanced "that Keats's work represented mere sensuality without substance", some of his poems began to find an appreciative audience, including "To Autumn". In an 1844 essay on Keats's poetry in the Dumfries Herald, George Gilfillian placed "To Autumn" among "the finest of Keats' smaller pieces". In an 1851 lecture, David Macbeth Moir acclaimed "four exquisite odes,—'To a Nightingale,' 'To a Grecian Urn,' 'To Melancholy,' and 'To Autumn,'—all so pregnant with deep thought, so picturesque in their limning, and so suggestive." In 1865, Matthew Arnold singled out the "indefinable delicacy, charm, and perfection of [...] Keats's [touch] in his Autumn". John Dennis, in an 1883 work about great poets, wrote that "the 'Ode to Autumn', ripe with the glory of the season it describes—must ever have a place among the most precious gems of lyrical poetry." The 1888 Britannica declared, "Of these [odes] perhaps the two nearest to absolute perfection, to the triumphant achievement and accomplishment of the very utmost beauty possible to human words, may be that to Autumn and that on a Grecian Urn".

At the turn of the 20th century, a 1904 analysis of great poetry by Stephen Gwynn claimed, "above and before all [of Keats's poems are] the three odes, To a Nightingale, On a Grecian Urn, and To Autumn. Among these odes criticism can hardly choose; in each of them the whole magic of poetry seems to be contained." Sidney Colvin, in his 1917 biography, pointed out that "the ode To Autumn [...] opens up no such far-reaching avenues to the mind and soul of the reader as the odes To a Grecian Urn, To a Nightingale, or On Melancholy, but in execution is more complete and faultless than any of them." Following this in a 1934 analysis of Romantic poetry, Margaret Sherwood stated that the poem was "a perfect expression of the phase of primitive feeling and dim thought in regard to earth processes when these are passing into a thought of personality."

Harold Bloom, in 1961, described "To Autumn" as "the most perfect shorter poem in the English language." Following this, Walter Jackson Bate, in 1963, claimed that "[...] each generation has found it one of the most nearly perfect poems in English." Later, in 1973, Stuart Sperry wrote, "'To Autumn' succeeds through its acceptance of an order innate in our experience – the natural rhythm of the seasons. It is a poem that, without ever stating it, inevitably suggests the truth of 'ripeness is all' by developing, with a richness of profundity of implication, the simple perception that ripeness is fall." In 1981, William Walsh argued that "Among the major Odes [...] no one has questioned the place and supremacy of 'To Autumn', in which we see wholly realized, powerfully embodied in art, the complete maturity so earnestly laboured at in Keats's life, so persuasively argued about in his letters." Literary critic and academic Helen Vendler, in 1988, declared that "in the ode 'To Autumn,' Keats finds his most comprehensive and adequate symbol for the social value of art."

In 1997, Andrew Motion summarised the critical view on "To Autumn": "it has often been called Keats's 'most ... untroubled poem' [...] To register the full force of its achievement, its tensions have to be felt as potent and demanding." Following in 1998, M. H. Abrams explained, "'To Autumn' was the last work of artistic consequence that Keats completed [...] he achieved this celebratory poem, with its calm acquiescence to time, transience and mortality, at a time when he was possessed by a premonition [...] that he had himself less than two years to live". James Chandler, also in 1998, pointed out that "If To Autumn is his greatest piece of writing, as has so often been said, it is because in it he arguably set himself the most ambitious challenge of his brief career and managed to meet it." Timothy Corrigan, in 2000, claimed that "'To Autumn' may be, as other critics have pointed out, his greatest achievement in its ability [...] to redeem the English vernacular as the casual expression of everyday experience, becoming in this his most exterior poem even in all its bucolic charm." In the same year, Thomas McFarland placed "To Autumn" with "Ode to a Nightingale", "Ode on a Grecian Urn", "The Eve of St. Agnes" and Hyperion as Keats's greatest achievement, together elevating Keats "high in the ranks of the supreme makers of world literature". In 2008, Stanley Plumly wrote, "history, posterity, immortality are seeing 'Ode to a Nightingale,' 'Ode on a Grecian Urn,' and 'To Autumn' as three of the most anthologized lyric poems of tragic vision in English."
