= Ode to a Nightingale =

1819 poem by John Keats

- by John Keats
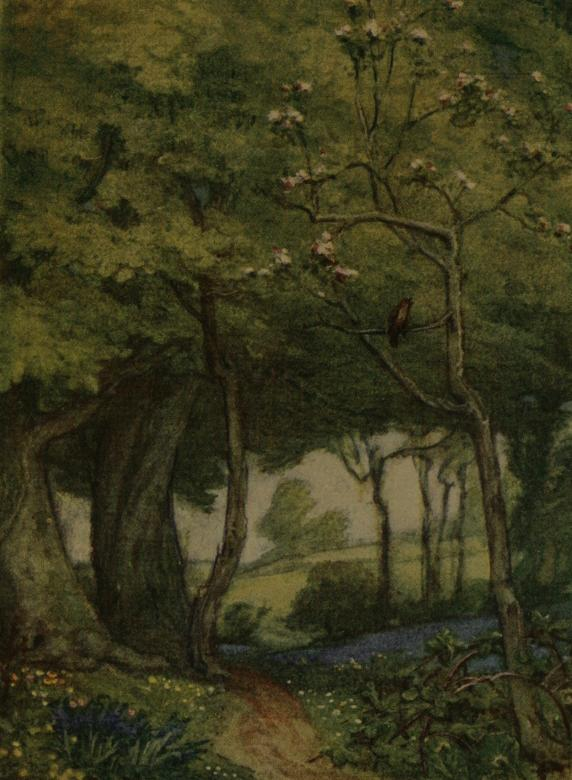
- W. J. Neatby's 1899 illustration for "Ode to a Nightingale"
- Written: 1819
- Country: England
- Language: English

Full text
- Ode to a Nightingale at Wikisource

"Ode to a Nightingale" is a poem by John Keats, one of his 1819 odes. It was written either in the garden of the Spaniards Inn, Hampstead, London, or, according to Keats' friend Charles Armitage Brown, under a plum tree in the garden of Keats' house at Wentworth Place, also in Hampstead. According to Brown, a nightingale had built its nest near the house that he shared with Keats in the spring of 1819. Inspired by the bird's song, Keats composed the poem in one day. It was first published in Annals of the Fine Arts the following July. The poem is one of the most frequently anthologized in the English language.

"Ode to a Nightingale" is a personal poem which describes Keats' journey into the state of negative capability. The tone rejects the optimistic pursuit of pleasure found within Keats's earlier poems and, instead, explores the themes of nature, transience and mortality, the latter being particularly relevant to Keats. The nightingale described experiences a type of death but does not actually die. Instead, it is capable of living through its song, a fate that humans cannot expect. The poem ends with an acceptance that pleasure cannot last and that death is an inevitable part of life, as Keats imagines the loss of the physical world and sees himself dead—a "sod" over which the nightingale sings.

Many critics favor "Ode to a Nightingale" for its themes but some believe that it is structurally flawed because the poem sometimes strays from its main idea.

== Background ==
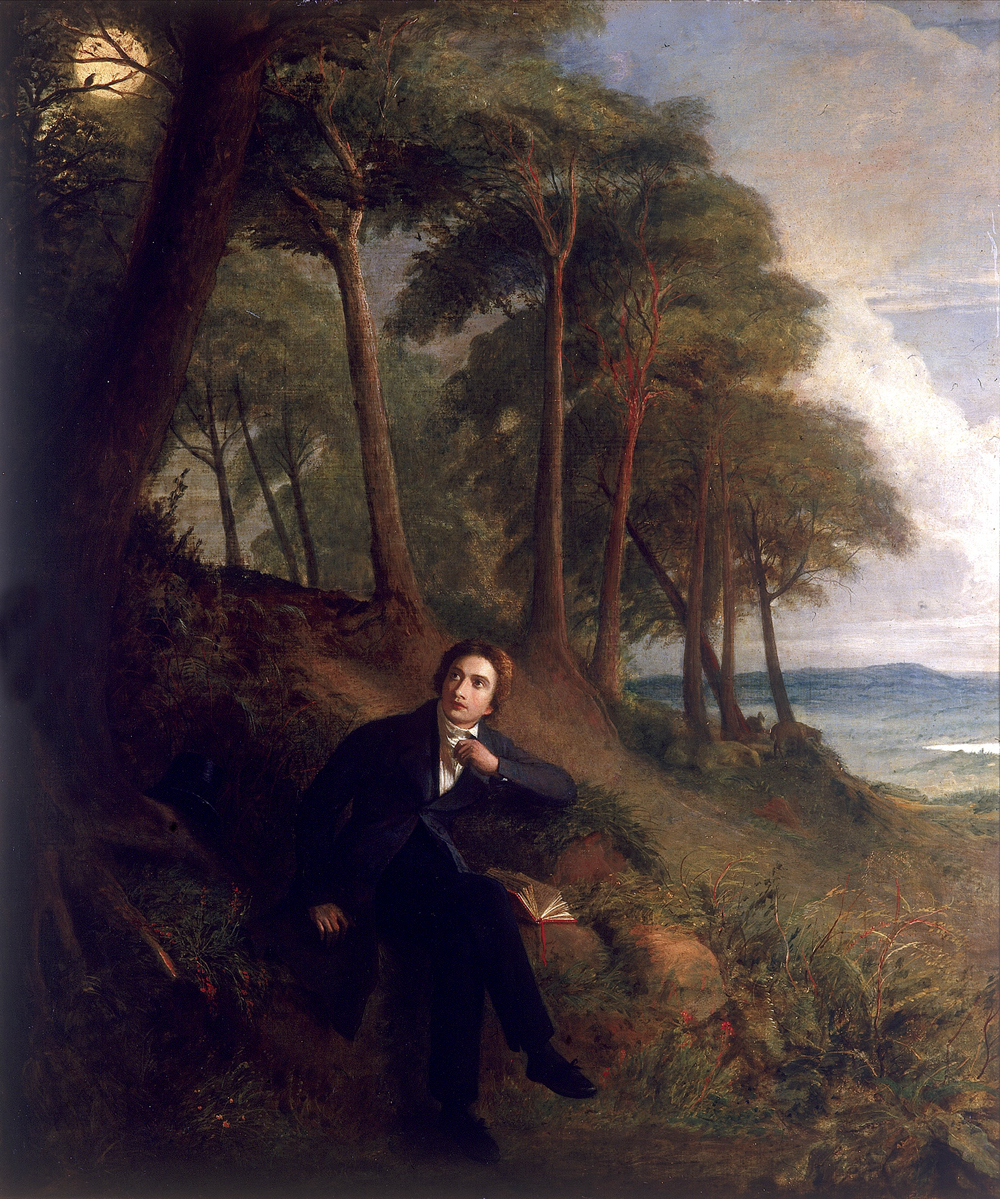
Keats Listening to a Nightingale on Hampstead Heath by Joseph Severn, c. 1845

Of Keats's six major odes of 1819, "Ode to Psyche", was probably written first and "To Autumn" written last. Some time between these two, he wrote "Ode to a Nightingale". It is possible that "Ode to a Nightingale" was written between 26 April and 18 May 1819, based on weather conditions and similarities between images in the poem and those in a letter sent to Fanny Brawne on May Day. The poem was composed at the Hampstead house Keats shared with his friend Charles Armitage Brown, possibly while sitting beneath a plum tree in the garden. According to Brown, Keats finished the ode in just one morning: "In the spring of 1819 a nightingale had built her nest near my house. Keats felt a tranquil and continual joy in her song; and one morning he took his chair from the breakfast-table to the grass-plot under a plum-tree, where he sat for two or three hours. When he came into the house, I perceived he had some scraps of paper in his hand, and these he was quietly thrusting behind the books. On inquiry, I found those scraps, four or five in number, contained his poetic feelings on the song of the nightingale." Brown's account is personal, as he claimed the poem was directly influenced by his house and preserved by his own doing. However, Keats relied on both his own imagination and other literature as sources for his depiction of the nightingale.

The exact date of "Ode to a Nightingale", as well as those of "Ode on Indolence", "Ode on Melancholy", and "Ode on a Grecian Urn", is unknown, as Keats dated all as 'May 1819'. However, he worked on the four poems together, and there is a unity in both their stanza forms and their themes. The exact order in which the poems were written is also unknown, but they form a sequence within their structures. While Keats was writing "Ode on a Grecian Urn" and the other poems, Brown transcribed copies of the poems and submitted them to Richard Woodhouse. During this time, Benjamin Haydon, Keats' friend, was given a copy of "Ode to a Nightingale", and he shared the poem with the editor of the Annals of the Fine Arts, James Elmes. Elmes paid Keats a small sum of money, and the poem was published in the July issue. The poem was later included in Keats' 1820 collection of poems Lamia, Isabella, The Eve of St Agnes, and Other Poems.

== Structure ==
"Ode to a Nightingale" was probably the first of the middle set of four odes that Keats wrote following "Ode to Psyche", according to Brown. This is further evidenced by the poems' structures. Keats experimentally combines two different types of lyrical poetry: the odal hymn and the lyric of questioning voice that responds to the odal hymn. This combination of structures is similar to that in "Ode on a Grecian Urn". In both poems, the dual form creates a dramatic element within the text. The stanza form of the poem is a combination of elements from Petrarchan sonnets and Shakespearean sonnets.

Keats incorporates a pattern of alternating historically "short" and "long" vowel sounds in his ode. In particular, line 18 ("And purple-stained mouth") has the historical pattern of "short" followed by "long" followed by "short" and followed by "long". This alternation is continued in longer lines, including line 31 ("Away! away! for I will fly to thee") which contains five pairs of alternations. However, other lines, such as line 3 ("Or emptied some dull opiate to the drains") rely on a pattern of five "short" vowels followed by "long" and "short" vowel pairings until they end with a "long" vowel. These are not the only combination patterns present, and there are patterns of two "short" vowels followed by a "long" vowel in other lines, including 12, 22, and 59, which are repeated twice and then followed up with two sets of "short" and then "long" vowel pairs. This reliance on vowel sounds is not unique to this ode, but is common to Keats's other 1819 odes and his Eve of St. Agnes.

The poem incorporates a complex reliance on assonance—the repetition of vowel sounds—in a conscious pattern, as found in many of his poems. Such a reliance on assonance is found in very few English poems. Within "Ode to a Nightingale", an example of this pattern can be found in line 35 ("Already with thee! tender is the night"), where the "ea" of "Already" connects with the "e" of "tender" and the "i" of "with" connects with the "i" of "is". This same pattern is found again in line 41 ("I cannot see what flowers are at my feet") with the "a" of "cannot" linking with the "a" of "at" and the "ee" of "see" linking with the "ee" of "feet". This system of assonance can be found in approximately a tenth of the lines of Keats's later poetry.

When it comes to other sound patterns, Keats relies on double or triple caesuras in approximately 6% of lines throughout the 1819 odes. An example from "Ode to a Nightingale" can be found within line 45 ("The grass, the thicket, and the fruit-tree wild") as the pauses after the commas are a "masculine" pause. Furthermore, Keats began to reduce the amount of Latin-based words and syntax that he relied on in his poetry, which in turn shortened the length of the words that dominate the poem. There is also an emphasis on words beginning with consonants, especially those that begin with "b", "p" or "v". The first stanza relies heavily on these three consonants, and they are used as a syzygy to add a musical tone within the poem.

Compared to his earlier verse, spondees are relatively abundant in his 1819 odes and other late poems. In "Ode to a Nightingale" they are used in just over 8% of his lines (compared to a mere 2.6% in Endymion). Examples include:

 /     ×  /   /   ×    ×  /    /  ×  /
Cool'd a long age in the deep-delvèd earth (line 12)

  ×    /  ×   /    ×  /     /   /      /   /
Where palsy shakes a few, sad, last, grey hairs (line 25)

To Walter Jackson Bate, the use of spondees in lines 31–34 creates a feeling of slow flight, and "in the final stanza . . . the distinctive use of scattered spondees, together with initial inversion, lend[s] an approximate phonetic suggestion of the peculiar spring and bounce of the bird in its flight."

== Poem ==
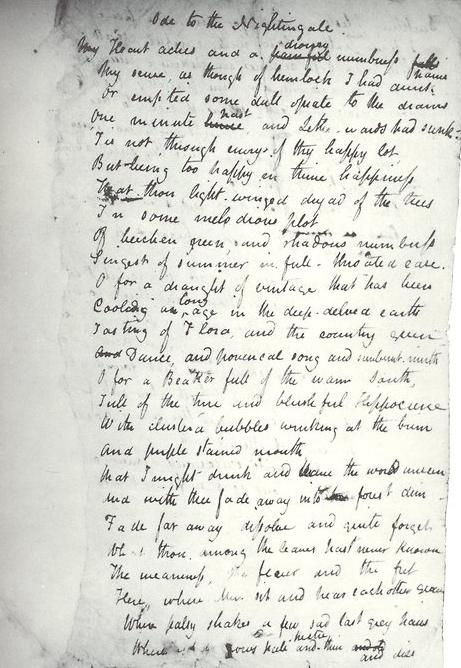
Holograph of Keats's "Ode to a Nightingale" written in May 1819

The first and sixth stanzas exemplify the juxtaposition of rapture and morbidity in the poem:

My heart aches, and a drowsy numbness pains
My sense, as though of hemlock I had drunk,
Or emptied some dull opiate to the drains
One minute past, and Lethe-wards had sunk:
'Tis not through envy of thy happy lot,
But being too happy in thine happiness,—
That thou, light-winged Dryad of the trees,
In some melodious plot
Of beechen green, and shadows numberless,
Singest of summer in full-throated ease.
...
Darkling I listen; and, for many a time
I have been half in love with easeful Death,
Call'd him soft names in many a mused rhyme,
To take into the air my quiet breath;
Now more than ever seems it rich to die,
To cease upon the midnight with no pain,
While thou art pouring forth thy soul abroad
In such an ecstasy!
Still wouldst thou sing, and I have ears in vain—
To thy high requiem become a sod.

— Stanzas 1 and 6 (lines 1-10, 51-60)

== Themes ==
"Ode to a Nightingale" describes a series of conflicts between reality and the Romantic ideal of uniting with nature. In the words of Richard Fogle, "The principal stress of the poem is a struggle between ideal and actual: inclusive terms which, however, contain more particular antitheses of pleasure and pain, of imagination and common sense reason, of fullness and privation, of permanence and change, of nature and the human, of art and life, freedom and bondage, waking and dream." Of course, the nightingale's song is the dominant image and dominant "voice" within the ode. The nightingale is also the object of empathy and praise within the poem. However, the nightingale and the discussion of the nightingale is not simply about the bird or the song, but about human experience in general. This is not to say that the song is a simple metaphor, but it is a complex image that is formed through the interaction of the conflicting voices of praise and questioning. On this theme, David Perkins summarizes the way "Ode to a Nightingale" and "Ode on a Grecian Urn" perform this when he says, "we are dealing with a talent, indeed an entire approach to poetry, in which symbol, however necessary, may possibly not satisfy as the principal concern of poetry, any more than it could with Shakespeare, but is rather an element in the poetry and drama of human reactions". However, there is a difference between an urn and a nightingale in that the nightingale is not an eternal entity. Furthermore, in creating any aspect of the nightingale immortal during the poem the narrator separates any union that he can have with the nightingale.

The nightingale's song within the poem is connected to the art of music in a way that the urn in "Ode on a Grecian Urn" is connected to the art of sculpture. As such, the nightingale would represent an enchanting presence and, unlike the urn, is directly connected to nature. As natural music, the song is for beauty and lacks a message of truth. Keats follows Coleridge's belief, as found in "The Nightingale", in separating from the world by losing himself in the bird's song. Although Keats favours a female nightingale over Coleridge's masculine bird, both reject the traditional depiction of the nightingale as related to the tragedy of Philomela. Their songbird is a happy nightingale that lacks the melancholic feel of previous poetic depictions. The bird is only a voice within the poem, but it is a voice that compels the narrator to join with in and forget the sorrows of the world. However, there is tension in that the narrator holds Keats's guilt regarding the death of Tom Keats, his brother. The song's conclusion represents the result of trying to escape into the realm of fancy.

Like Percy Bysshe Shelley's "To a Skylark", Keats's narrator listens to a bird song, but listening to the song within "Ode to a Nightingale" is almost painful and similar to death. The narrator seeks to be with the nightingale and abandons his sense of vision in order to embrace the sound in an attempt to share in the darkness with the bird. As the poem ends, the trance caused by the nightingale is broken and the narrator is left wondering if it was a real vision or just a dream. The poem's reliance on the process of sleeping is common to Keats's poems, and "Ode to a Nightingale" shares many of the same themes as Keats' Sleep and Poetry and Eve of St. Agnes. This further separates the image of the nightingale's song from its closest comparative image, the urn as represented in "Ode on a Grecian Urn". The nightingale is distant and mysterious, and even disappears at the end of the poem. The dream image emphasizes the shadowiness and elusiveness of the poem. These elements make it impossible for there to be a complete self-identification with the nightingale, but it also allows for self-awareness to permeate throughout the poem, albeit in an altered state.

Midway through the poem, there is a split between the two actions of the poem: the first attempts to identify with the nightingale and its song, and the second discusses the convergence of the past with the future while experiencing the present. This second theme is reminiscent of Keats's view of human progression through the Mansion of Many Apartments and how man develops from experiencing and wanting only pleasure to understanding truth as a mixture of both pleasure and pain. The Elysian fields and the nightingale's song in the first half of the poem represent the pleasurable moments that overwhelm the individual like a drug. However, the experience does not last forever, and the body is left desiring it until the narrator feels helpless without the pleasure. Instead of embracing the coming truth, the narrator clings to poetry to hide from the loss of pleasure. Poetry does not bring about the pleasure that the narrator originally asks for, but it does liberate him from his desire for only pleasure.

Responding to this emphasis on pleasure, Albert Guerard, Jr. argues that the poem contains a "longing not for art but a free reverie of any kind. The form of the poem is that of progression by association, so that the movement of feeling is at the mercy of words evoked by chance, such words as fade and forlorn, the very words that, like a bell, toll the dreamer back to his sole self." However, Fogle points out that the terms Guerard emphasizes are "associational translations" and that Guerard misunderstands Keats's aesthetic. After all, the acceptance of the loss of pleasure by the end of the poem is an acceptance of life and, in turn, of death. Death was a constant theme that permeated aspects of Keats poetry because he was exposed to death of his family members throughout his life. Within the poem, there are many images of death. The nightingale experiences a sort of death and even the god Apollo experiences death, but his death reveals his own divine state. As Perkins explains, "But, of course, the nightingale is not thought to be literally dying. The point is that the deity or the nightingale can sing without dying. But, as the ode makes clear, man cannot—or at least not in a visionary way."

With this theme of a loss of pleasure and inevitable death, the poem, according to Claude Finney, describes "the inadequacy of the romantic escape from the world of reality to the world of ideal beauty". Earl Wasserman essentially agrees with Finney, but he extended his summation of the poem to incorporate the themes of Keats's Mansion of Many Apartments when he says, "the core of the poem is the search for the mystery, the unsuccessful quest for light within its darkness" and this "leads only to an increasing darkness, or a growing recognition of how impenetrable the mystery is to mortals." With these views in mind, the poem recalls Keats's earlier view of pleasure and an optimistic view of poetry found within his earlier poems, especially Sleep and Poetry, and rejects them. This loss of pleasure and incorporation of death imagery lends the poem a dark air, which connects "Ode to a Nightingale" with Keats' other poems that discuss the demonic nature of poetic imagination, including Lamia. In the poem, Keats imagines the loss of the physical world and sees himself dead—he uses an abrupt, almost brutal word for it—as a "sod" over which the nightingale sings. The contrast between the immortal nightingale and mortal man, sitting in his garden, is made all the more acute by an effort of the imagination. The presence of weather is noticeable in the poem, as spring came early in 1819, bringing nightingales all over the heath.

== Reception ==
Contemporary critics of Keats enjoyed the poem, and it was heavily quoted in their reviews. An anonymous review of Keats's poetry that ran in the August and October 1820 Scots Magazine stated: "Amongst the minor poems we prefer the 'Ode to the Nightingale'. Indeed, we are inclined to prefer it beyond every other poem in the book; but let the reader judge. The third and seventh stanzas have a charm for us which we should find it difficult to explain. We have read this ode over and over again, and every time with increased delight." At the same time, Leigh Hunt wrote a review of Keats's poem for the 2 August and 9 August 1820 The Indicator: "As a specimen of the Poems, which are all lyrical, we must indulge ourselves in quoting entire the 'Ode to a Nightingale'. There is that mixture in it of real melancholy and imaginative relief, which poetry alone presents us in her 'charmed cup,' and which some over-rational critics have undertaken to find wrong because it is not true. It does not follow that what is not true to them, is not true to others. If the relief is real, the mixture is good and sufficing."

John Scott, in an anonymous review for the September 1820 edition of The London Magazine, argued for the greatness of Keats's poetry as exemplified by poems including "Ode to a Nightingale":

The injustice which has been done to our author's works, in estimating their poetical merit, rendered us doubly anxious, on opening his last volume, to find it likely to seize fast hold of general sympathy, and thus turn an overwhelming power against the paltry traducers of talent, more eminently promising in many respects, than any the present age has been called upon to encourage. We have not found it to be quite all that we wished in this respect—and it would have been very extraordinary if we had, for our wishes went far beyond reasonable expectations. But we have found it of a nature to present to common understandings the poetical power with which the author's mind is gifted, in a more tangible and intelligible shape than that in which it has appeared in any of his former compositions. It is, therefore, calculated to throw shame on the lying, vulgar spirit, in which this young worshipper in the temple of the Muses has been cried-down; whatever questions may still leave to be settled as to the kind and degree of his poetical merits. Take for instance, as proof of the justice of our praise, the following passage from an Ode to the Nightingale:--it is distinct, noble, pathetic, and true: the thoughts have all chords of direct communication with naturally-constituted hearts: the echoes of the strain linger bout the depths of human bosoms.

In a review for the 21 January 1835 London Journal, Hunt claimed that while Keats wrote the poem, "The poet had then his mortal illness upon him, and knew it. Never was the voice of death sweeter." David Moir, in 1851, used The Eve of St Agnes to claim, "We have here a specimen of descriptive power luxuriously rich and original; but the following lines, from the 'Ode to a Nightingale,' flow from a far more profound fountain of inspiration."

At the end of the 19th century, Robert Bridges's analysis of the poem became a dominant view and would influence later interpretations of the poem. Bridges, in 1895, declared that the poem was the best of Keats's odes but he thought that the poem contained too much artificial language. In particular, he emphasised the use of the word "forlorn" and the last stanza as being examples of Keats's artificial language. In "Two odes of Keats's" (1897), William C Wilkinson suggested that "Ode to a Nightingale" is deeply flawed because it contains too many "incoherent musings" that failed to supply a standard of logic that would allow the reader to understand the relationship between the poet and the bird. However, Herbert Grierson, arguing in 1928, believed Nightingale to be superior to "Ode on a Grecian Urn", "Ode on Melancholy", and "Ode to Psyche", arguing the exact opposite of Wilkinson as he stated that "Nightingale", along with "To Autumn", showed a greater amount of logical thought and more aptly presented the cases they were intended to make.

=== 20th-century criticism ===
At the beginning of the 20th century, Rudyard Kipling referred to lines 69 and 70, alongside three lines from Samuel Taylor Coleridge's Kubla Khan, when he claimed of poetry: "In all the millions permitted there are no more than five—five little lines—of which one can say, 'These are the magic. These are the vision. The rest is only Poetry.'" In 1906, Alexander Mackie argued: "The nightingale and the lark for long monopolised poetic idolatry—a privilege they enjoyed solely on account of their pre-eminence as song birds. Keats's Ode to a Nightingale and Shelley's Ode to a Skylark are two of the glories of English literature; but both were written by men who had no claim to special or exact knowledge of ornithology as such." Sidney Colvin, in 1920, argued, "Throughout this ode Keats's genius is at its height. Imagination cannot be more rich and satisfying, felicity of phrase and cadence cannot be more absolute, than in the several contrasted stanzas calling for the draft of southern vintage […] To praise the art of a passage like that in the fourth stanza […] to praise or comment on a stroke of art like this is to throw doubt on the reader's power to perceive it for himself."

Bridges' view of "Ode to a Nightingale" was taken up by H. W. Garrod in his 1926 analysis of Keats's poems. As Albert Gerard would argue later in 1944, Garrod believed that the problem within Keats's poem was his emphasis on the rhythm and the language instead of the main ideas of the poem. When describing the fourth stanza of the poem, Maurice Ridley, in 1933, claimed, "And so comes the stanza, with that remarkable piece of imagination at the end which feels the light as blown by the breezes, one of those characteristic sudden flashes with which Keats fires the most ordinary material." He later declared of the seventh stanza: "And now for the great stanza in which the imagination is fanned to yet whiter heat, the stanza that would, I suppose, by common consent be taken, along with Kubla Khan, as offering us the distilled sorceries of 'Romanticism'". He concluded on the stanza that "I do not believe that any reader who has watched Keats at work on the more exquisitely finished of the stanzas in The Eve of St. Agnes, and seen this craftsman slowly elaborating and refining, will ever believe that this perfect stanza was achieved with the easy fluency with which, in the draft we have, it was obviously written down." In 1936, F. R. Leavis wrote, "One remembers the poem both as recording, and as being for the reader, an indulgence." Following Leavis, Cleanth Brooks and Robert Penn Warren, in a 1938 essay, saw the poem as "a very rich poem. It contains some complications which we must not gloss over if we are to appreciate the depth and significance of the issues engaged." Brooks would later argue in The Well-Wrought Urn (1947) that the poem was thematically unified while contradicting many of the negative criticisms lodged against the poem.

Richard Fogle responded to the critical attack on Keats's emphasis on rhyme and language put forth by Garrod, Gerard, and others in 1953. His argument was similar to Brooks: that the poem was thematically coherent and that there is a poet within the poem that is different from Keats the writer of the poem. As such, Keats consciously chose the shift in the themes of the poem and the contrasts within the poem represent the pain felt when comparing the real world to an ideal world found within the imagination. Fogle also responded directly to the claims made by Leavis: "I find Mr. Leavis too austere, but he points out a quality which Keats plainly sought for. His profusion and prodigality is, however, modified by a principle of sobriety." It is possible that Fogle's statements were a defense of Romanticism as a group that was both respectable in terms of thought and poetic ability. Wasserman, following in 1953, claimed that "Of all Keats' poems, it is probably the 'Ode to a Nightingale' that has most tormented the critic [...] in any reading of the 'Ode to a Nightingale' the turmoil will not down. Forces contend wildly within the poem, not only without resolution, but without possibility of resolution; and the reader comes away from his experience with the sense that he has been in 'a wild Abyss'". He then explained, "It is this turbulence, I suspect, that has led Allen Tate to believe the ode 'at least tries to say everything that poetry can say.' But I propose it is the 'Ode on a Grecian Urn' that succeeds in saying what poetry can say, and that the other ode attempts to say all that the poet can."

=== Later critical responses ===
Although the poem was defended by a few critics, E. C. Pettet returned to the argument that the poem lacked a structure and emphasized the word "forlorn" as evidence of his view. In his 1957 work, Pettet did praise the poem as he declared, "The Ode to a Nightingale has a special interest in that most of us would probably regard it as the most richly representative of all Keats's poems. Two reasons for this quality are immediately apparent: there is its matchless evocation of that late spring and early summer season […] and there is its exceptional degree of 'distillation', of concentrated recollection". David Perkins felt the need to defend the use of the word "forlorn" and claimed that it described the feeling from the impossibility of not being able to live in the world of the imagination. When praising the poem in 1959, Perkins claimed, "Although the "Ode to a Nightingale" ranges more widely than the "Ode on a Grecian Urn," the poem can also be regarded as the exploration or testing out of a symbol, and, compared with the urn as a symbol, the nightingale would seem to have both limitations and advantages." Walter Jackson Bate also made a similar defense of the word "forlorn" by claiming that the world described by describing the impossibility of reaching that land. When describing the poem compared to the rest of English poetry, Bate argued in 1963, "Ode to a Nightingale" is among "the greatest lyrics in English" and the only one written with such speed: "We are free to doubt whether any poem in English of comparable length and quality has been composed so quickly." In 1968, Robert Gittins stated, "It may not be wrong to regard [Ode on Indolence and Ode on Melancholy] as Keats's earlier essays in this [ode] form, and the great Nightingale and Grecian Urn as his more finished and later works."

From the late 1960s onward, many of the Yale School of critics describe the poem as a reworking of John Milton's poetic diction, but, they argued, that poem revealed that Keats lacked the ability of Milton as a poet. The critics, Harold Bloom (1965), Leslie Brisman (1973), Paul Fry (1980), John Hollander (1981) and Cynthia Chase (1985), all focused on the poem with Milton as a progenitor to "Ode to a Nightingale" while ignoring other possibilities, including Shakespeare who was emphasised as being the source of many of Keats's phrases. Responding to the claims about Milton and Keats's shortcomings, critics like R. S. White (1981) and Willard Spiegelman (1983) used the Shakespearean echoes to argue for a multiplicity of sources for the poem to claim that Keats was not trying to respond just to Milton or escape from his shadow. Instead, "Ode to a Nightingale" was an original poem, as White claimed, "The poem is richly saturated in Shakespeare, yet the assimilations are so profound that the Ode is finally original, and wholly Keatsian". Similarly, Spiegelman claimed that Shakespeare's A Midsummer Night's Dream had "flavored and ripened the later poem". This was followed in 1986 by Jonathan Bate claiming that Keats was "left enriched by the voice of Shakespeare, the 'immortal bird'".

Focusing on the quality of the poem, Stuart Sperry, argued in 1973, "'Ode to a Nightingale' is the supreme expression in all Keats's poetry of the impulse to imaginative escape that flies in the face of the knowledge of human limitation, the impulse fully expressed in 'Away! away! for I will fly to thee.'" Wolf Hirst, in 1981, described the poem as "justly celebrated" and claimed that "Since this movement into an eternal realm of song is one of the most magnificent in literature, the poet's return to actuality is all the more shattering." Helen Vendler continued the earlier view that the poem was artificial but added that the poem was an attempt to be aesthetic and spontaneous that was later dropped. In 1983, she argued, "In its absence of conclusiveness and its abandonment to reverie, the poem appeals to readers who prize it as the most personal, the most apparently spontaneous, the most immediately beautiful, and the most confessional of Keats's odes. I believe that the 'events' of the ode, as it unfolds in time, have more logic, however, than is usually granted them, and that they are best seen in relation to Keats's pursuit of the idea of music as a nonrepresentational art."

In a review of contemporary criticism of "Ode to a Nightingale" in 1998, James O'Rouke claimed that "To judge from the volume, the variety, and the polemical force of the modern critical responses engendered, there have been few moments in English poetic history as baffling as Keats's repetition of the word 'forlorn'". When referring to the reliance of the ideas of John Dryden and William Hazlitt within the poem, Poet Laureate Andrew Motion, in 1999, argued "whose notion of poetry as a 'movement' from personal consciousness to an awareness of suffering humanity it perfectly illustrates."

== Musical settings ==
Settings of "Ode to a Nightingale" began to emerge at the end of the 19th century. The earliest comprised only the second half of the eighth stanza, beginning "Adieu, adieu! They plaintive anthem fades". This was included in the cantata The Swan and the Skylark by Arthur Thomas, which Charles Villiers Stanford later orchestrated. It premiered in 1894. The length of Keats' poem lent itself to more ambitious choral treatment by later composers, including Ernest Walker's (1908). Later in the 20th century came Valentyn Silvestrov's cantata for soprano, piano and chamber orchestra, a 1973 setting in three movements of a Russian translation by Yevgeny Vitkovsky. The ode has also been set as an art song by such composers as Cecil Forsyth, for baritone and piano or small orchestra (1894); Hamilton Harty, for soprano and orchestra, (premiering in 1907); and George Antheil for flute, viola and piano (1950).
