= Ode on Melancholy =

1819 poem by John Keats

Portrait of John Keats by William Hilton, after Joseph Severn (National Portrait Gallery, London)

"Ode on Melancholy" is one of five odes composed by English poet John Keats in the spring of 1819, along with "Ode on a Grecian Urn", "Ode to a Nightingale", "Ode on Indolence", and "Ode to Psyche". The narrative of the poem describes the poet's perception of melancholy through a lyric discourse between the poet and the reader, along with the introduction to Ancient Grecian characters and ideals.

== Background ==
While studying at Enfield, Keats attempted to gain a knowledge of Grecian art from translations of Tooke's Pantheon, Lempriere's Classical Dictionary and Spence's Polymetis. Although Keats attempted to learn Ancient Greek, the majority of his understanding of Grecian mythology came from the translations into English. "Ode on Melancholy" contains references to classical themes, characters, and places such as Psyche, Lethe, and Proserpine in its description of melancholy, as allusions to Grecian art and literature were common among the "five great odes".

Unlike the speaker of "Ode on a Grecian Urn", "Ode to a Nightingale", and "Ode to Psyche", the speaker of "Ode on Melancholy" speaks directly to the reader rather than to an object or an emotion. With only three stanzas, the poem is the shortest of the odes Keats wrote in 1819; however, the original first stanza of the poem was removed before the poem's publication in 1820. It was:

Though you should build a bark of dead men's bones,
And rear a phantom gibbet for a mast,
Stitch shrouds together for a sail, with groans
To fill it out, blood-stained and aghast;
Although your rudder be a dragon's tail
Long sever'd, yet still hard with agony,
Your cordage large uprootings from the skull
Of bald Medusa, certes you would fail
To find the Melancholy—whether she
Dreameth in any isle of Lethe dull.

— (original lines 1-10)

According to Harold Bloom, one can presume that the "harmony was threatened if fully half of [the poem] was concerned with the useless quest after "The Melancholy". Despite its adjusted length, Keats thought the poem to be of a higher quality than "Ode on Indolence", which was not published until 1848, after Keats's death.

== Structure ==
"Ode on Melancholy" consists of three stanzas with ten lines each. Because the poem has fewer stanzas than "Ode on Indolence" and "Ode on a Grecian Urn", the rhyme scheme appears less elaborate, with the first and second stanzas sharing a rhyme scheme of: ABABCDECDE, while the third takes on one of its own: ABABCDEDCE. As with "Ode on a Grecian Urn", "Ode on Indolence", and "To Autumn", each stanza begins with an ABAB rhyme scheme then finishes with a Miltonic sestet. The general meter of the poem is iambic pentameter.

== Themes and critical responses ==
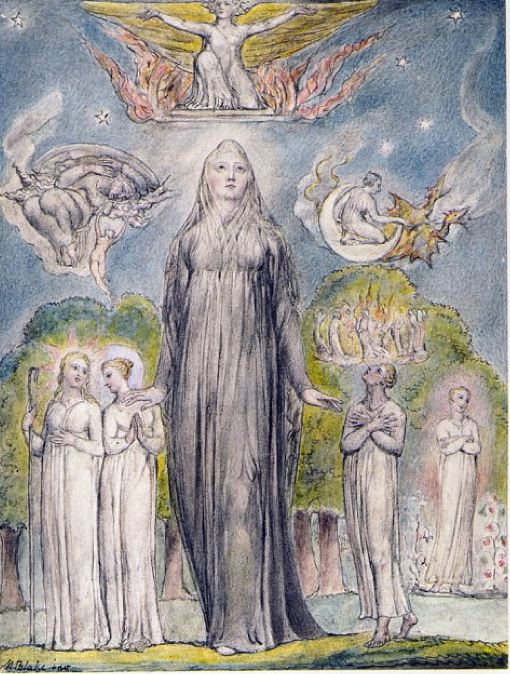
William Blake's Melancholy, an illustration to Milton's "Il Penseroso", c. 1816–1820

Personification is implemented with words such as 'Joy', 'Beauty', 'Delight', and 'Pleasure' allowing the poet to create characters out of ideals and emotions as he describes his thoughts and reactions to feelings of melancholy. The difference between the personification of these words and those in the other odes Keats wrote in 1819 comes from the fact that while the poet describes them as human, he declines to interact with them. Keats himself fails to appear in the poem, which creates what Andrew Bennett describes as a separation between the author, the poet, and the reader. In Reading Voices, Garrett Stewart reaffirms Bennett's assertion that Keats's voice never appears in the poem itself when he says, "For all the florid staginess of his conceits, there is, in short, no mention of writing, of the melancholic as a writer."

Negative capability appears subtly in "Ode on Melancholy" according to Harold Bloom, who describes the negatives in the poem as being the result of a carefully crafted ironies that first become truly evident as the poet describes the onset of melancholy through an allegorical image of April rains supplying life to flowers. The use of the "droop-headed flowers" (line 13) to describe the onset of an ill-temper, according to Bloom, represents a "passionate" attempt by the poet to describe the proper reaction to melancholy. In the original first stanza, the "Gothicizing" of the ideal of melancholy strikes Bloom as more ironical and humorous, but with the removal of that text, the image of the "droop-headed flowers" loses the irony it would otherwise contain, and in doing so subverts the negative capability seen in "Ode to a Nightingale", yet Bloom states that the true negativity becomes clear in the final stanza's discussion of Beauty. The final stanza begins:

She dwells with Beauty— Beauty that must die (line 21)

which he suggests supplies the ultimate case of a negative relationship because it suggests that the only true beauty is one that will die. But Thomas McFarland, while acknowledging the importance of the original first stanza to Keats's endeavor, openly praises the removal of the lines as an act of what he calls "compression". McFarland believes that the poem's strength lies in its ability to avoid the "Seemingly endless wordage of "Endymion" and lets the final stanza push the main themes on its own. By removing unnecessary information such as the reason the poet suggests the trip to Lethe, Keats allows the reader to avoid the "fancy" aspects that would have appeared in the first line and were not sustained throughout the rest of the text.

== Sexual references ==
Although the poem contains no overt sexual references, allegations of a hidden sexuality in the poem's text appear in Christopher John Murray's Encyclopedia of the Romantic Era. Murray suggests that the poem instructs the reader to approach melancholy in a manner that will result in the most pleasurable outcome for the reader. The words "burst Joy's Grape" in line 28 lead Daniel Brass to state:

The height of the joy, the moment when the world can improve no further, is both the end of joy and the beginning of melancholy. A climax implies a dénouement, and 'bursting Joy's grape' involves both the experience of ultimate satisfaction, with the powerful image of the juice bursting forth from a burst grape, and the beginning of a decline.

In The Masks of Keats, Thomas McFarland suggests that Keats's beautiful words and images attempt to combine the non-beautiful subject of melancholy with the beauty inherent in the form of the ode. He too writes that the images of the bursting grape and the "globèd peonies" show an intention by the poet to bring the subject of sexuality into the discussion on melancholy.

== Text ==
No, no, go not to Lethe, neither twist
Wolf's-bane, tight-rooted, for its poisonous wine;
Nor suffer thy pale forehead to be kiss'd
By nightshade, ruby grape of Proserpine;
Make not your rosary of yew-berries,
Nor let the beetle, nor the death-moth be
Your mournful Psyche, nor the downy owl
A partner in your sorrow's mysteries;
For shade to shade will come too drowsily,
And drown the wakeful anguish of the soul.

But when the melancholy fit shall fall
Sudden from heaven like a weeping cloud,
That fosters the droop-headed flowers all,
And hides the green hill in an April shroud;
Then glut thy sorrow on a morning rose,
Or on the rainbow of the salt sand-wave,
Or on the wealth of globed peonies;
Or if thy mistress some rich anger shows,
Emprison her soft hand, and let her rave,
And feed deep, deep upon her peerless eyes.

She dwells with Beauty—Beauty that must die;
And Joy, whose hand is ever at his lips
Bidding adieu; and aching Pleasure nigh,
Turning to poison while the bee-mouth sips:
Ay, in the very temple of Delight
Veil'd Melancholy has her sovran shrine,
Though seen of none save him whose strenuous tongue
Can burst Joy's grape against his palate fine;
His soul shalt taste the sadness of her might,
And be among her cloudy trophies hung.
