= A Philosophical View of Reform =

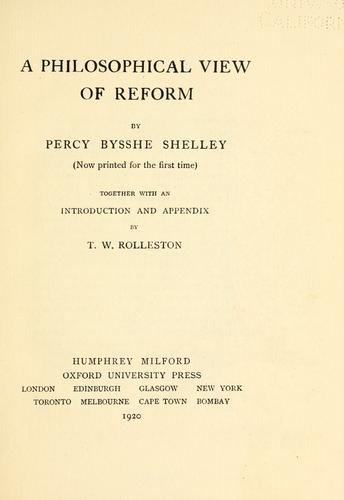
1920 Oxford edition.

A Philosophical View of Reform is a major prose work by Percy Bysshe Shelley written in 1819-20 and first published in 1920 by Oxford University Press. The political essay is Shelley's longest prose work.

== Analysis ==
Shelley composed A Philosophical View of Reform between November, 1819 and 20 May 1820, meant to address political developments in England at that time. He advocated non-violence and a moderate response to the repressive measures imposed by the British government. One of the events he addressed was the Peterloo Massacre, which occurred on 16 August 1819, in St. Peter's Field near Manchester, where a peaceful demonstration seeking parliamentary reform was attacked by militia.

The bookseller Richard Carlile had been found guilty of blasphemy by a jury in November, 1819 for printing an edition of The Age of Reason (1794-6) by Thomas Paine. The “Six Acts” had been promulgated in December which placed restrictions on public gatherings and freedom of the press.

It was during this unstable political period in England in late 1819 when Shelley started writing A Philosophical View of Reform. Shelley told John and Maria Gisborne on 6 November: "I have deserted the odorous gardens of literature to journey across the great sandy desert of Politics."

Shelley proposed five reforms:

1. abolish the national debt.
2. disband the standing army.
3. abolish sinecures.
4. abolish tithes, and make all religions, all forms of opinion regarding the origin and government of the universe, equal under the law.
5. make justice inexpensive, certain, and speedy, and extend the institution of juries to every possible occasion of jurisprudence.

Shelley opposed revolution, advocating instead gradual change through non-violence. He argued that individual and institutional reform went hand in hand. He maintained that poets, writers, and philosophers would stimulate reforms of the social institutions that would benefit everyone in society.

Shelley informed his publisher Charles Ollier on 19 December 1819 that he sought A Philosophical View of Reform "to be an instructive and readable book, appealing from the passions to the reason of men", informing him that he would not finish it "this season".

On 26 May 1820 he asked Leigh Hunt if he could find a publisher for the work: "Do you know any bookseller who wd publish for me an octavo volume entitled 'A philosophical View of Reform'. It is boldly but temperately written – & I think readable – It is intended for a kind of standard book for the philosophical reformers."

Mary Shelley had a transcript made of the manuscript with plans to publish the work. The political essay remained unpublished, however, until 1920 when it appeared for the first time in print in an edition published by Humphrey Milford, Oxford University Press, with an introduction and appendix by Thomas William Rolleston.

== Sources ==
- Sandy, Mark. "A Philosophical View of Reform". The Literary Encyclopedia. First published 21 March 2002 accessed 20 July 2011.
- Ripley, Brian. "Percy Bysshe Shelley's 'A Philosophical View of Reform'": www.shelley.235.ca/
- Shelley's Ghost: Reshaping the Image of a Literary Family: http://shelleysghost.bodleian.ox.ac.uk/a-philosophical-view-of-reform#Description
- "A Philosophical View of Reform." Encyclopædia Britannica. Encyclopædia Britannica Online. Encyclopædia Britannica, 2011. Web. 20 July 2011. .
- Walker, A. Stanley. "Peterloo, Shelley and Reform." PMLA, Vol. 40, No. 1 (March, 1925), pp. 128–164.
- Cameron, Kenneth Neill. "The Social Philosophy of Shelley." The Sewanee Review, Vol. 50, No. 4 (October–December, 1942), pp. 457–466.
- Pulos, C.E. "Shelley and Malthus". PMLA, Vol. 67, No. 2 (Mar., 1952), pp. 113–124.
- Franta, Andrew. "Shelley and the Poetics of Political Indirection". Poetics Today, 2001, 22, 4, pp. 765–793.
- Abana, Yuxuf Akwo. The Shelleys and empire: 'Prometheus Unbound', 'Frankenstein', 'A Philosophical View of Reform', and the modern African fictions of liberation. PhD. dissertation, University of Arizona, 2006: https://www.researchgate.net/publication/279657974_The_Shelleys_and_Empire_Prometheus_Unbound_Frankenstein_A_Philosophical_View_of_Reform_and_the_Modern_African_Fictions_of_Liberation
- Foot, Paul, ed. Shelley's Revolutionary Year: Shelley's Political Poems and the Essay "A Philosophical View of Reform". With an Introduction by Paul Foot. Redwords, 1990.
- Shelley, Percy Bysshe. A Philosophical View of Reform. University Press of the Pacific, 2004.
