= Ode on Indolence =

1819 poem by John Keats

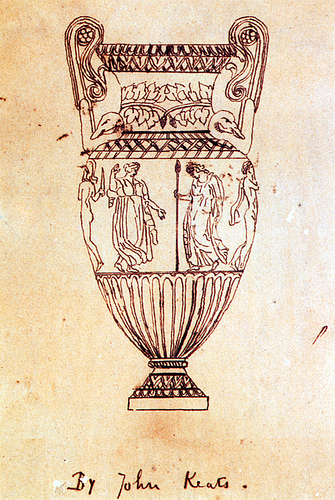
Tracing of an engraving of the Sosibios vase by John Keats. The figures of "Ode on Indolence" are described as similar to those from an urn.

The "Ode on Indolence" is one of five odes composed by English poet John Keats in the spring of 1819. The others were "Ode on a Grecian Urn", "Ode on Melancholy", "Ode to a Nightingale" and "Ode to Psyche". The poem describes the state of indolence, a word which is synonymous with "avoidance" or "laziness". The work was written during a time when Keats was presumably more than usually occupied with his material prospects. After finishing the spring poems, Keats wrote in June 1819 that its composition brought him more pleasure than anything else he had written that year. Unlike the other odes he wrote that year, "Ode on Indolence" was not published until 1848, 27 years after his death.

The poem is an example of Keats's break from the structure of the classical form. It follows the poet's contemplation of a morning spent in idleness. Three figures are presented—Ambition, Love and Poesy—dressed in "placid sandals" and "white robes". The narrator examines each using a series of questions and statements on life and art. The poem concludes with the narrator giving up on having all three of the figures as part of his life. Some critics regard "Ode on Indolence" as inferior to the other four 1819 odes. Others suggest that the poem exemplifies a continuity of themes and imagery characteristic of his more widely read works, and provides valuable biographical insight into his poetic career.

== Background ==
By the spring of 1819, Keats had left his poorly paid position as a surgeon at Guy's Hospital, Southwark, London, to devote himself to poetry. On 12 May 1819, he abandoned this plan after receiving a request for financial assistance from his brother, George. Unable to help, Keats was torn by guilt and despair and sought projects more lucrative than poetry. It was under these circumstances that he wrote "Ode on Indolence".

Portrait of John Keats by William Hilton

In a letter to his brother dated 19 March 1819, Keats discussed indolence as a subject. He may have written the ode as early as March, but the themes and stanza forms suggest May or June 1819; when it is known he was working on "Ode on a Grecian Urn", "Ode on Melancholy", "Ode to a Nightingale" and "Ode to Psyche". During this period, Keats's friend Charles Armitage Brown transcribed copies of the spring odes and submitted them to publisher Richard Woodhouse. Keats wrote to his friend Sarah Jeffrey: "[T]he thing I have most enjoyed this year has been writing an ode to Indolence." Despite this enjoyment, however, he was not entirely satisfied with "Ode on Indolence", and it remained unpublished until 1848.

Keats's notes and papers do not reveal the precise dating of the 1819 odes. Literary scholars have proposed several different orders of composition, arguing that the poems form a sequence within their structures. In The Consecrated Urn, Bernard Blackstone observes that "Indolence" has been variously thought the first, second, and final of the five 1819 odes. Biographer Robert Gittings suggests "Ode on Indolence" was written on 4 May 1819, based upon Keats's report about the weather during the ode's creation; Douglas Bush insists it was written after "Nightingale", "Grecian Urn", and "Melancholy". Based on his examination of the stanza forms, Keats biographer Andrew Motion thinks "Ode on Indolence" was written after "Ode to Psyche" and "Ode to a Nightingale", although he admits there is no way to be precise about the dates. Nevertheless, he argues that "Ode on Indolence" was probably composed last.

== Structure ==
"Ode on Indolence" relies on ten line stanzas with a rhyme scheme that begins with a Shakespearian quatrain (ABAB) and ends with a Miltonic sestet (CDECDE). This pattern is used in "Ode on Melancholy", "Ode to a Nightingale" and "Ode on a Grecian Urn", which further unifies the poems in their structure in addition to their themes.

The poem contains a complicated use of assonance (the repetition of vowel sounds), as evident in line 19, "O why did ye not melt, and leave my sense", where the pairs ye/leave and melt/sense share vowel sounds. A more disorganized use of assonance appears in line 31, "A third time pass'd they by, and, passing, turn'd", in which the pairs third/turn'd, time/by, and pass'd/passing share vowel sounds. The third line exemplifies the poem's consistent iambic pentameter scansion:

×   /    × /     × /  ×    /      × /
And one behind the other stepp'd serene

Keats occasionally inverts the accent of the first two syllables of each line or a set of syllables within the middle of a line. 2.3% of the internal syllables are inverted in the "Ode on Indolence", whereas only 0.4% of the internal syllables of his other poems contain such inversions.

== Poem ==
The poem relies on a first-person narration style similar to "Ode to Psyche". It begins with a classical scene from an urn in a similar manner to "Ode on a Grecian Urn", but the scene in "Indolence" is allegorical. The opening describes three figures that operate as three fates:

One morn before me were three figures seen,
With bowed necks, and joined hands, side-faced;
And one behind the other stepp'd serene,
In placid sandals, and in white robes graced;
They pass'd, like figures on a marble urn,
When shifted round to see the other side;
They came again; as when the urn once more
Is shifted round, the first seen shades return;
And they were strange to me, as may betide
With vases, to one deep in Phidian lore.

— lines 1-10

The figures remain mysterious as they circle around the narrator. Eventually they turn towards him and it is revealed that they are Ambition, Love, and Poesy, the themes of the poem:

A third time pass'd they by, and, passing, turn'd
Each one the face a moment whiles to me;
Then faded, and to follow them I burn'd
And ached for wings, because I knew the three;
The first was a fair Maid, and Love her name;
The second was Ambition, pale of cheek,
And ever watchful with fatigued eye;
The last, whom I love more, the more of blame
Is heap'd upon her, maiden most unmeek,—
I knew to be my demon Poesy.

— lines 21–30

The poet wishes to be with the three figures, but he is unable to join them. The poem transitions into the narrator providing reasons why he would not need the three figures and does so with ambition and love, but he cannot find a reason to dismiss poesy:

They faded, and, forsooth! I wanted wings:
O folly! What is Love? and where is it?
And for that poor Ambition! it springs
From a man's little heart's short fever-fit;
For Poesy!—no,—she has not a joy,—
At least for me,—so sweet as drowsy noons,
And evenings steep'd in honied indolence;
O, for an age so shelter'd from annoy,
That I may never know how change the moons,
Or hear the voice of busy common-sense!

— lines 31–40

Concluding the poem, the narrator argues that the figures should be treated as figures, and that he would not be misled by them:

So, ye three Ghosts, adieu! Ye cannot raise
My head cool-bedded in the flowery grass;
For I would not be dieted with praise,
A pet-lamb in a sentimental farce!
Fade softly from my eyes, and be once more
In masque-like figures on the dreary urn;
Farewell! I yet have visions for the night,
And for the day faint visions there is store;
Vanish, ye Phantoms! from my idle spright,
Into the clouds, and never more return!

— lines 51–60

== Themes ==
The poem centres on humanity and human nature. When the poet sees the figures, he wants to know their names and laments his ignorance. Eventually, he realizes that they are representative of Love, Ambition, and Poetry. While he longs, he fears they are out of reach and therefore tries to reject them. He argues that love is what he needs least and dismisses it by questioning what "love" actually means ("What is Love? and where is it?"). He rejects ambition, but it requires more work ("And for that poor Ambition—it springs / From a man's little heart's short fever-fit;"). Unlike the personas of Love and Ambition, the narrator is unable to find a reason to banish Poesy (Poetry), which reflects the poets' inner conflict: should he abandon poetry to focus on a career in which he can earn a decent living? Keats sought to write great poetry but feared his pursuit of literary prominence was based on a delusional view of his own merit as a poet. Further, he was incapable of completing his epic, "Hyperion". As Walter Jackson Bate explains, to Keats "Neither a finished 'grand Poem' nor even the semblance of a modest financial return seemed nearer."

Keats realized that he could never have Love, could not fulfil his Ambition, and could not spend his time with Poesy. The conclusion of "Ode to Indolence" is a dismissal of both the images and his poetry as figures that would only mislead him. Even indolence itself seems unattainable; Andrew Motion writes that the figures force Keats to regard indolence as "the privilege of the leisured class to which he did not belong." If the poem is read as the final poem in the 1819 ode series, "Ode on Indolence" suggests that Keats is resigned to giving up his career as a poet because poetry cannot give him the immortality he wanted from it. Ironically, the poem provided Keats with such immortality. Besides the biographical component, the poem also describes Keats's belief that his works should capture the beauty of art while acknowledging the harshness of life. In this way, the poems as a group capture Keats's philosophy of negative capability, the concept of living with unreconciled contradictory views, by trying to reconcile Keats's desire to write poetry and his inability to do so by abandoning poetry altogether and accepting life as it is.

Within the many poems that explore this idea—among them Keats's and the works by his contemporaries—Keats begins by questioning suffering, breaks it down to its most basic elements of cause and effect, and draws conclusions about the world. His own process is filled with doubt, but his poems end with a hopeful message that the narrator (himself) is finally free of desires for Love, Ambition, and Poesy. The hope contained within "Ode on Indolence" is found within the vision he expresses in the last stanza: "I yet have visions for the night/And for the day faint visions there is store." Consequently, in her analysis of Keats' Odes, Helen Vendler suggests that "Ode on Indolence" is a seminal poem constructed with themes and images that appeared more influential in his other, sometimes later, poems. The ode is an early and entirely original work that establishes the basis of Keats's notion of soul making, a method by which the individual builds his or her soul through a form of education consisting of suffering and personal experience. This is a fundamental preoccupation of the Romantics, who believed the way to reconcile man and nature was through this soul development, education—the combination of experience and contemplation—and that only this process, not the rationality of the previous century, would bring about true Enlightenment.

The classical influences Keats invoked affected other Romantic poets, but his odes contain a higher degree of allusion than most of his contemporaries' works. As for the main theme, indolence and poetry, the poem reflects the emotional state of being Keats describes in an early 1819 letter to his brother George:

[I]ndolent and supremely careless ... from my having slumbered till nearly eleven ... please has no show of enticement and pain no unbearable frown. Neither Poetry, nor Ambition, nor Love have any alertness of countenance as they pass by me: they seem rather like three figures on a greek vase—a Man and two women—whom no one but myself could distinguish in their disguisement.

Willard Spiegelman, in his study of Romantic poetry, suggests that the indolence of the poem arises from the narrator's reluctance to apply himself to the labour associated with poetic creation. Some critics provide other explanations, and William Ober claims that Keats's description of indolence may have arisen from the use of opium.

== Critical response ==
Literary critics regard "Ode on Indolence" as inferior to Keats's other 1819 odes. Walter Evert wrote that "it is unlikely that the 'Ode on Indolence' has ever been anyone's favorite poem, and it is certain that it was not Keats's. Why he excluded it from the 1820 volume we do not know, but it is repetitious and declamatory and structurally infirm, and these would be reasons enough." Bate indicated that the poem's value is "primarily biographical and not poetic".

"Ode on Indolence" is sometimes called upon as a point of comparison when discussing Keats's other poems. Charles Wentworth Dilke observed that while the poem can be read as a supplemental text to assist the study of "Grecian Urn", it remains a much inferior work. In 2000, Thomas McFarland wrote in consideration of Dilke's comparison: "Far more important than the similarity, which might seem to arise from the urns in Keats's purview in both Ode on Indolence and Ode on a Grecian Urn ... is the enormous dissimilarity in the two poems. Ode on Indolence ... is a flaccid enterprise that hardly bears mention alongside that other achievement."

Sidney Colvin, in his 1917 biography on Keats, grouped "Indolence" with the other 1819 odes in categorizing Keats's "class of achievements". In 1948, Lord Gorell described the fifth stanza as, "lacking the magic of what the world agrees are the great Odes" but describes the language as "[d]elicate, charming even". Later, in a 1968 biography of Keats, Gittings describes the importance of the poem: "The whole ode, in fact, has a borrowed air, and he acknowledged its lack of success by not printing it with the others ... Yet with its acceptance of the numb, dull and indolent mood as something creative, it set the scene for all the odes that followed."

In 1973, Stuart Sperry described it as "a rich and nourishing immersion in the rush of pure sensation and its flow of stirring shadows and 'dim dreams'. In many ways the ode marks both a beginning and an end. It is both the feeblest and potentially the most ambitious of the sequence. Yet its failure, if we choose to consider it that, is more the result of deliberate disinclination than any inability of means." Andrew Motion, in 1997, argued, "Like 'Melancholy', the poem is too articulate for its own poetic good ... In two of his May odes, 'Melancholy' and 'Indolence', Keats defined themes common to the whole group with such fierce candour that he restricted their imaginative power. His identity had prevailed."
