= John Keats's 1819 odes =

Poems

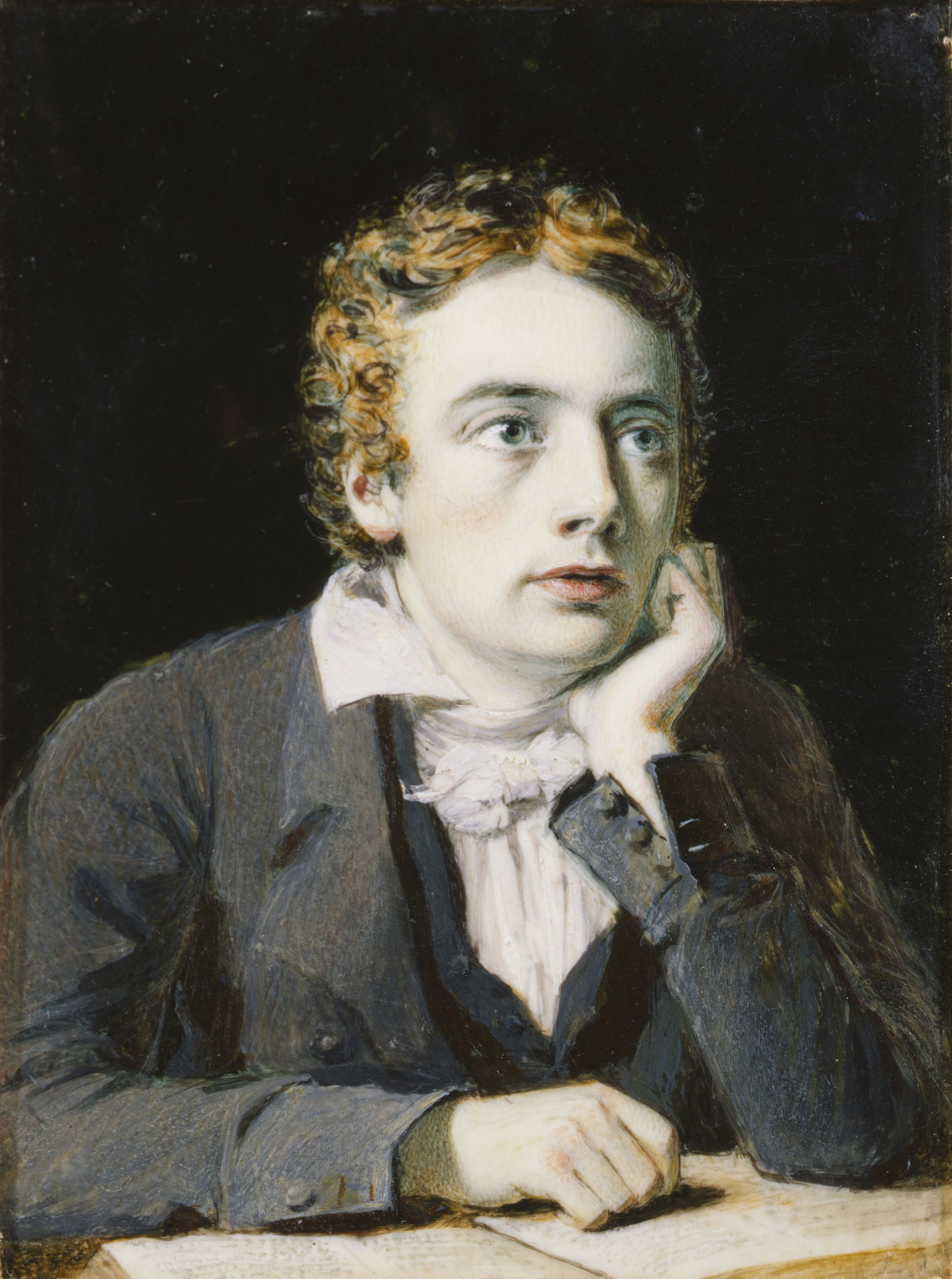
John Keats in 1819, painted by his friend Joseph Severn

In 1819, John Keats composed six odes, which are among his most famous and well-regarded poems. Keats wrote the first five poems, "Ode on a Grecian Urn", "Ode on Indolence", "Ode on Melancholy", "Ode to a Nightingale", and "Ode to Psyche" in quick succession during the spring, and he composed "To Autumn" in September. While the exact order in which Keats composed the poems is unknown, some critics contend that they form a thematic whole if arranged in sequence. As a whole, the odes represent Keats's attempt to create a new type of short lyrical poem, which influenced later generations.

== Background ==
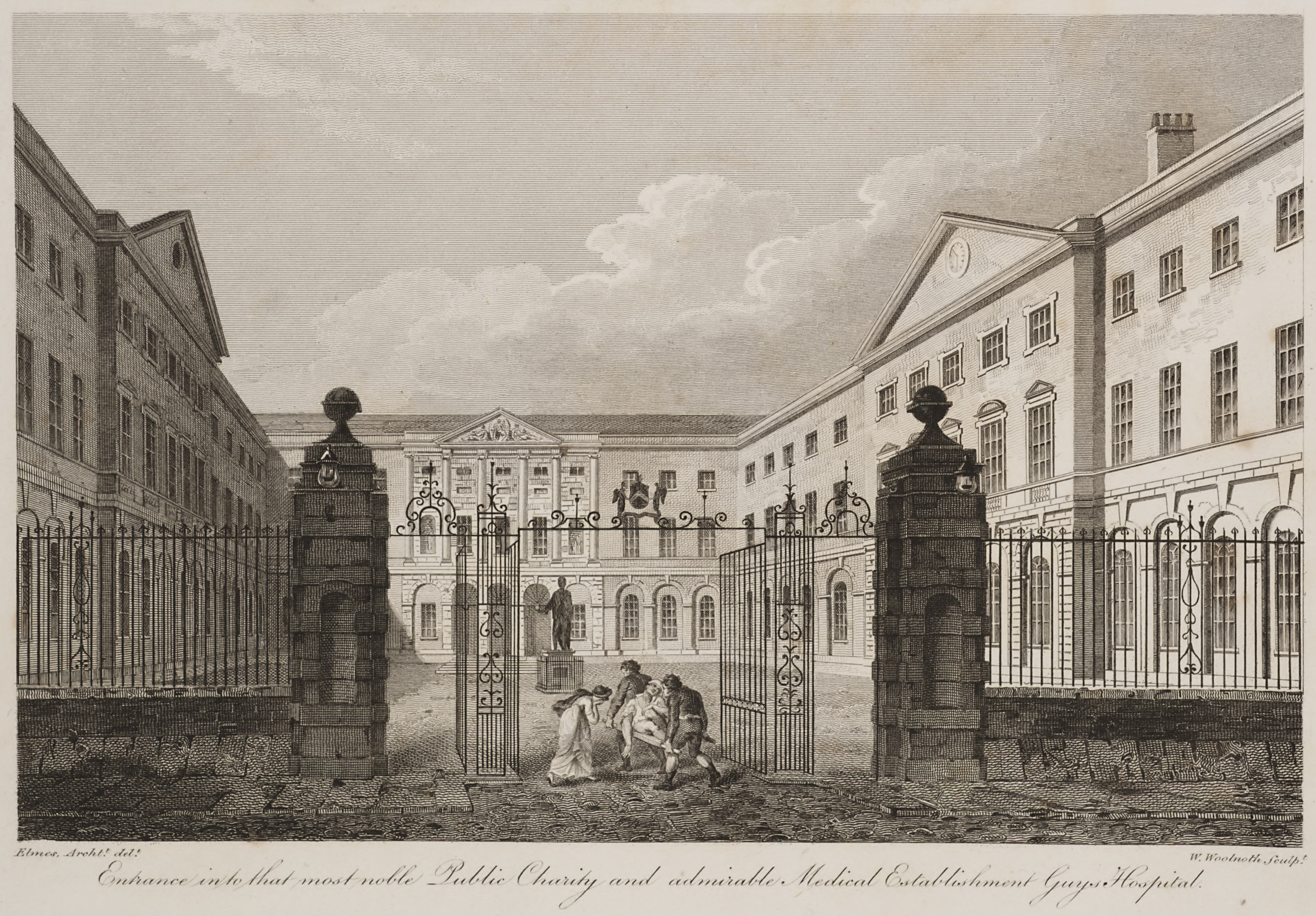
The entrance to Guy's Hospital in 1820

Early in 1819, Keats left his poorly paid position as dresser (or assistant house surgeon) at Guy's Hospital, Southwark, London to completely devote himself to a career in poetry. In the past, he had relied on his brother George for financial assistance from time to time, but now, when his brother appealed to him for the same aid, the cash-strapped poet was unable to help and was overwhelmed with guilt and despair. He decided to forsake the life of a poet for a more lucrative career – but not before allowing himself a few months of poetic indulgence.

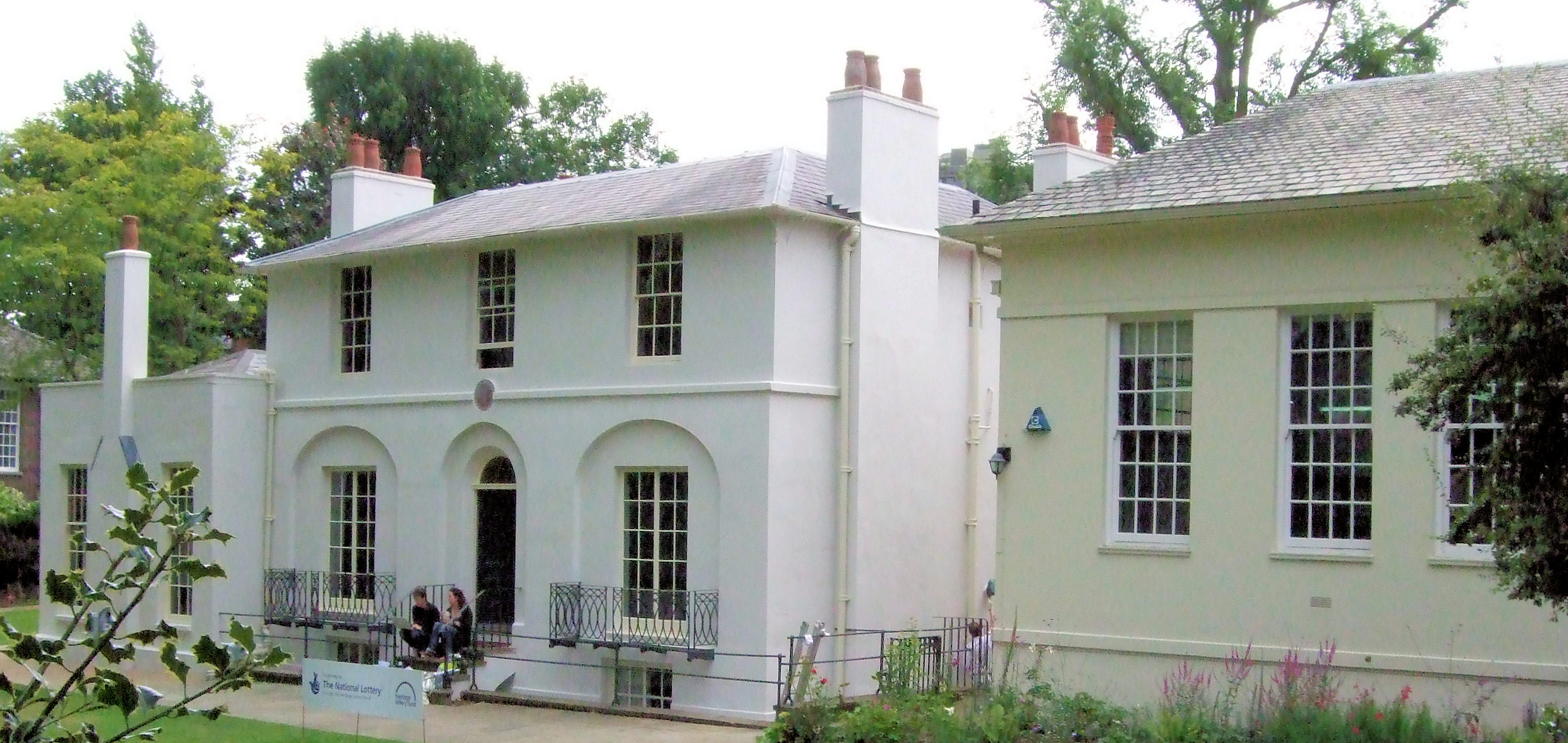
Keats lived at Wentworth Place during the composition of his 1819 odes.

It was during the months of spring 1819 that he wrote many of his major odes. Following the month of May 1819, he began to tackle other forms of poetry, including a play, some longer pieces, and a return to his unfinished epic, Hyperion. His brother's financial woes continued to loom over him, and, as a result, Keats had little energy or inclination for composition, but, on 19 September 1819, he managed to compose To Autumn, his last major work and the one that rang the curtain down on his career as a poet.

== Structure ==
After writing "Ode to Psyche", Keats sent the poem to his brother and explained his new ode form: "I have been endeavouring to discover a better Sonnet stanza than we have. The legitimate does not suit the language well, from the pouncing rhymes; the other appears too elegiac, and the couplet at the end of it has seldom a pleasing effect. I do not pretend to have succeeded. It will explain itself."

Writing these poems had a particular influence on Keats, as Walter Jackson Bate explains:

However felicitous he may have been in writing them, these short poems of one of the greatest of English lyrists are the by-product of other efforts; and those habits of both ideal and practice left him more dissatisfied than he would otherwise have been with the pressure of most lyric forms toward quick, neat solution [...] The new ode form appealed also because it was sufficiently confining to challenge his conscience as a craftsman. Finally, the union of amplitude and formal challenge offered unique opportunities as well for the concentrated intensity and concreteness of idiom that he had begun to master in Hyperion.

In "Ode to Psyche", Keats incorporated a narrative structure that sets the scene, gives background information, and then ends with a conclusion. Of these structural elements, the preface was discontinued in his next odes and the setting is reduced within the other odes until the scene is merely implied.

== Poems ==
The exact chronological and interpretive orders of the six 1819 poems are unknown, but "Ode to Psyche" was probably written first and "To Autumn" last. Keats simply dated the others May 1819. However, he worked on the spring poems together, and they form a sequence within their structures.

=== Ode on a Grecian Urn ===
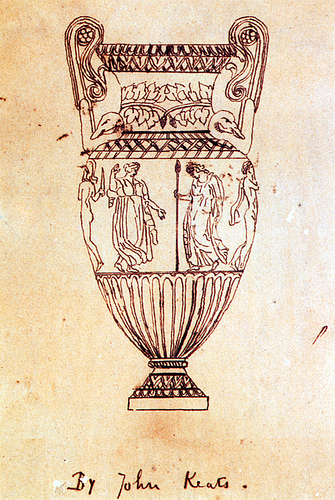
Tracing made by Keats of the Sosibios Vase

"Ode on a Grecian Urn" is a lyric ode with five stanzas containing 10 lines each. The first stanza begins with the narrator addressing an ancient urn as "Thou still unravished bride of quietness!", initiating a conversation between the poet and the object, which the reader is allowed to observe from a third-person point of view. By describing the object as a "foster-child of silence and slow time", the poet describes the urn as both a silent object, a theme which reoccurs throughout the poem, and a stone object that resists change.

Throughout the first two stanzas, the speaker addresses the urn as a single object, taking note of its silence at several points as he discusses unheard melodies and tunes heard not by the sensual ear (line 13). In Keats, Narrative, and Audience, Andrew Bennett suggests that the discussion between the poet and the urn at the beginning of the poem leaves the reader to examine more than just the relationship between the two but also his place as a third-party observer. With line 17, the second stanza begins to change tone as the poet shifts his focus from the urn as a whole to the individuals represented in the artwork. The two lovers, whose image the unknown artist has created through his craftsmanship, appear to the poet as a couple who cannot kiss yet do not grow old. Again the narrator discusses the urn in terms of its unaging qualities by saying, "She cannot fade, though thou hast not thy bliss" (line 19), but he also focuses on the inability of the lovers to ever obtain sensual pleasure due to their static nature. In this Ode the poet compares the urn with the bride sitting in silence. He also compares it with a foster's child. In the 2nd stanza, he describes his feelings when he listens unheard music. He says that unheard melodies are sweeter than heard melodies. In the 3rd, 4th, & 5th stanzas he presents his observations about the painting on the surface of the urn. As the poem comes to a close, the narrator once again addresses the urn as a single object. However, his tone becomes sharper as he seeks answers from the work of art that it appears unable to answer. In the final couplet, the poet provides a line for the urn, which complicates the narrative and has generated a multitude of critical responses as to the author's intent: "Beauty is truth—truth beauty / that is all ye know on earth and all ye need to know" (lines 49–50).

=== Ode on Indolence ===
"Ode on Indolence" comprises six stanzas containing ten lines each. The poem discusses a morning of laziness on the part of the narrator, during which his attention becomes captivated by three figures he sees in a vision. Beginning with an epigraph taken from Matthew 6:28, the poet introduces the theme of indolence through an excerpt of Jesus's suggestion that God provides for the lilies of the field without making them toil. The poem describes the three figures as wearing "placid sandals" and "white robes", which alludes to the Grecian mythology that commonly appears in the 1819 odes. The images pass the narrator three times, which causes him to compare them to images on a spinning urn (line 7). In line 10, the narrator uses the word "Phidian" again as a reference to the Elgin Marbles, whose creation was thought to have been overseen by Phidias, a Grecian artist. As the poem progresses, the narrator begins to discuss the intrusion upon his indolence by the figures of Love, Ambition, and Poesy, and he suggests that the images have come to "steal away" his idle days. In the final stanzas, the figure of Poesy is described as a daemon which Helen Vendler suggests poses a direct threat to the idleness the poet wishes to retain. In the final lines, the poet once again rejects the three images: "Vanish, ye phantoms, from my idle spright, / Into the clouds, and never more return!" (lines 39–40) with the intention of once again enjoying the laziness from which the poem obtains its title.

=== Ode on Melancholy ===
"Ode on Melancholy" is the shortest of the 1819 spring odes at three stanzas of 10 lines. Originally, the poem contained four stanzas, but the original first stanza was removed before publication in 1820 for stylistic reasons. The poem describes the narrator's opinions on melancholy and is addressed specifically to the reader, unlike the narrative of many of the other odes. The lyric nature of the poem allows the poet to describe the onset of melancholy and then provides the reader with different methods of dealing with the emotions involved. Using personification, the poem creates characters out of Joy, Pleasure, Delight, and Beauty, and allows them to interact with two other characters which take the shape of a male and his female mistress mentioned (line 17). Keats himself fails to appear as a character in the poem, as there is no mention of the poet himself suffering from melancholy. In the final stanza, the poet describes the mistress as dwelling in Beauty, but modifies the beauty by saying that it "must die" (line 21). Harold Bloom suggests that this provides the poem with a hint of Keats's philosophy of negative capability, as only the beauty that will die meets the poem's standard of true beauty. The image of the bursting of Joy's grape (line 28) gives the poem a theme of sexuality. According to critics, the bursting of the grape alludes to the passing from the moment of ultimate sexual pleasure to the decreased pleasure of a post-orgasmic state.

=== Ode to a Nightingale ===
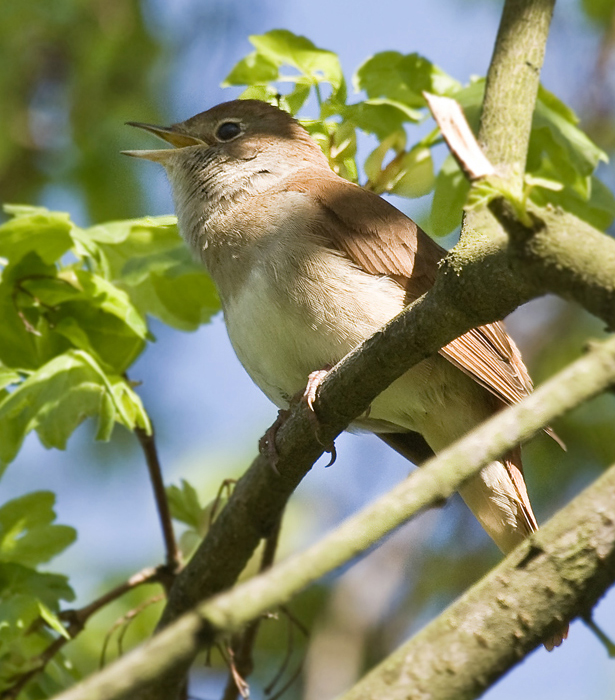
Nightingale (Luscinia megarhynchos)

"Ode to a Nightingale" is the longest of the 1819 odes with 8 stanzas containing 10 lines each. The poem begins by describing the state of the poet, using negative statements to intensify the description of the poet's physical state such as "numbless pains" and "not through envy of thy happy lot" (lines 1–5). While the ode is written "to a Nightingale", the emphasis of the first line is placed upon the narrator rather than the bird, and Helen Vendler suggests that the negation of the reader as a party in the discourse happens just as the song of the nightingale becomes the "voice of pure self-expression". In the third stanza, the poet asks the nightingale to "Fade far away", casting it off just as the narrator in "Ode to Indolence" rejects the Love, Ambition, and Poesy and the poet in "Ode on a Grecian Urn" banishes the figures on the urn to silence. In the fourth stanza, the poet states that he will fly to the nightingale rather than it to him, moving upon the "wings of Poesy", which leaves Walter Jackson Bate to believe that while the poet intends to identify with the bird by describing the poem as being "to" it, the real identification in the narrative exists between the poet and his perceptions of the nightingale's song. In its closing, the poem questions whether the bird's song has been real or part of a dream: "Was it a vision, or a waking dream? / Fled is that music:—do I wake or sleep?" (lines 79–80), and the theme of imagination once again arises as the poet appears, according to Timothy Hilton, unable to distinguish between his own artistic imagination and the song which he believes to have spurred it into action.

=== Ode to Psyche ===
"Ode to Psyche" is a 67-line poem written in stanzas of varying length, which took its form from modification Keats made to the sonnet structure. The ode is written to a Grecian mythological character, displaying a great influence of Classical culture as the poet begins his discourse with "O GODDESS!" (line 1). Psyche, a creature so beautiful that she drew the attention of Cupid himself, draws the attention of the narrator, whose artistic imagination causes him to dream of her: "Surely I dream'd to-day, or did I see / The wingèd Psyche with awaken'd eyes" (lines 5–6). As he relates himself to the mythical character of Cupid, he confuses the god's emotions with his own and imagines that he too has fallen in love with the woman's beauty. The poet does, however, understand the temporal difference between the characters of ancient Greece and his own as he declares, "even in these days [...] I see, and sing, by my own eyes inspired" (lines 40–43). In line 50, the poet states "Yes, I will be thy priest, and build a fane", which, Harold Bloom suggests, implies that the poet himself becomes a "prophet of the soul" as he regards the beauty of Psyche and attempts to place himself within Cupid's personage. According to T.S. Eliot, it is the most prominent ode among the six great odes.

=== To Autumn ===
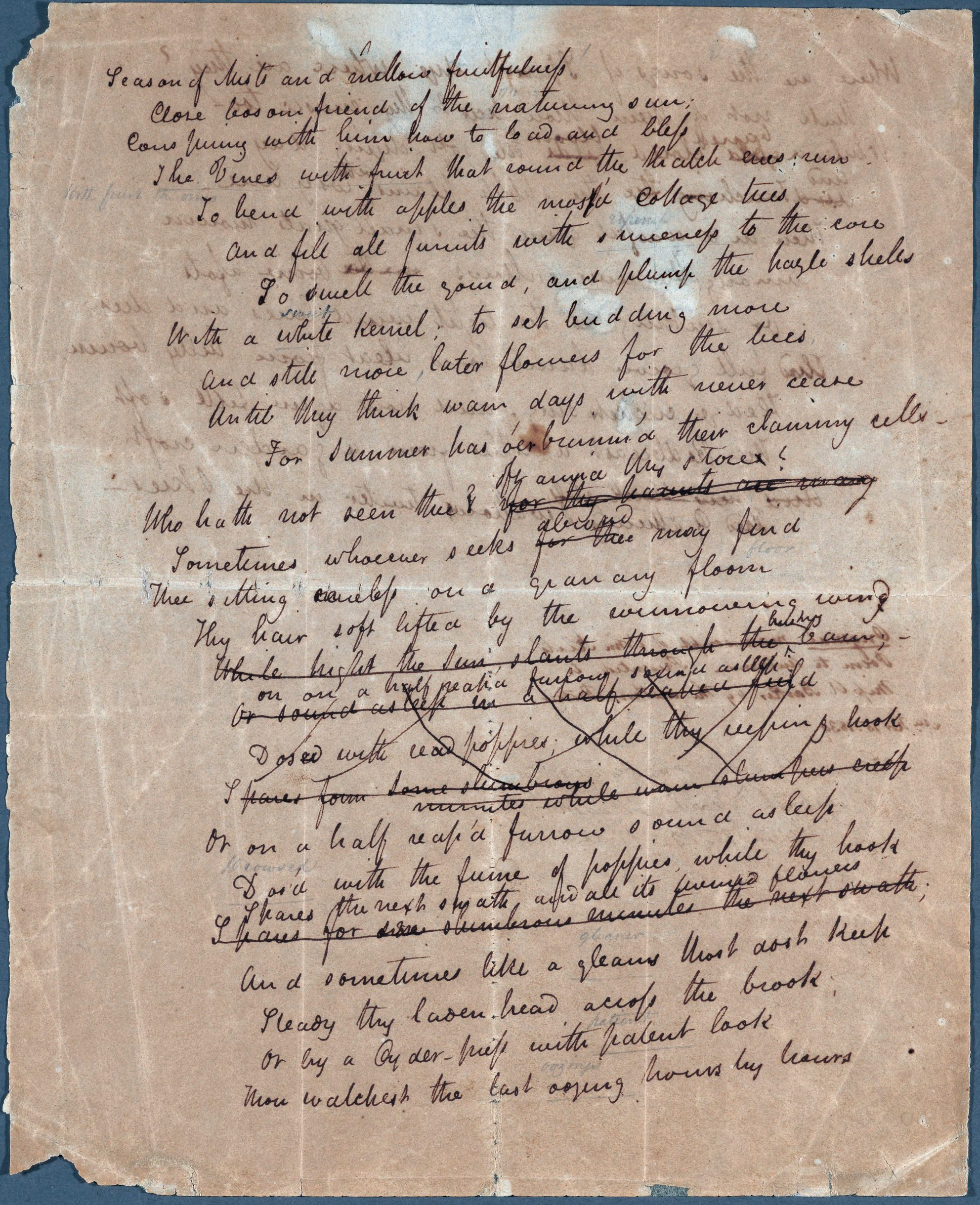
Unrestored manuscript copy of "To Autumn"

"To Autumn" is a 33-line poem broken into three stanzas of 11. It discusses how autumn is both a force of growth and maturation, and deals with the theme of approaching death. While the earlier 1819 odes perfected techniques and allowed for variations that appear within "To Autumn", Keats dispenses with some aspects of the previous poems (such as the narrator) to focus on the themes of autumn and life. The poem discusses ideas without a progression of the temporal scene, an idea that Keats termed as "stationing". The three stanzas of the poem emphasize this theme by shifting the imagery from summer to early winter and also day turning into dusk.

== Critical reception ==
Keats's use of the odal hymn in his six odes, along with his use of the odal hymn with a responsal voice in "Ode to a Grecian Urn" and "Ode to a Nightingale", created, according to Walter Jackson Bate, "a new tone for the English lyric." Bate, when speaking about the 1819 odes, wrote: "The productivity of the three and a half weeks that begins on April 21 is difficult to parallel in the career of any modern writer. Yet to Keats it was not even a new beginning. It was rather a matter of becoming more alive in preparation for the next beginning." In addition to this, Bate argued that "It is because "To Autumn" is so uniquely a distillation, and at many different levels, that each generation has found it one of the most nearly perfect poems in English. We need not be afraid of continuing to use the adjective [...] The 'Ode to a Nightingale,' for example, is a less 'perfect' though a greater poem." Charles Patterson argued the relationship of "Ode on a Grecian Urn" as the greatest 1819 ode of Keats: "The meaningfulness and range of the poem, along with its controlled execution and powerfully suggestive imagery, entitle it to a high place among Keats's great odes. It lacks the even finish and extreme perfection of "To Autumn" but is much superior in these qualities to the "Ode to a Nightingale" despite the magic passages in the latter and the similarities of over-all structure. In fact, the "Ode on a Grecian Urn" may deserve to rank first in the group if viewed in something approaching its true complexity and human wisdom." Later, Ayumi Mizukoshi argued that early audiences did not support "Ode to Psyche" because it "turned out to be too reflexive and internalised to be enjoyed as a mythological picture. For the same reason, the "Ode on a Grecian Urn" drew neither attention nor admiration. Herbert Grierson believed "Nightingale" to be superior to the other odes because it and "To Autumn" were more logical and contained stronger arguments. Although the poet is gazing round the surface of the urn in each stanza, the poem cannot readily be consumed as a series of 'idylls'."
