= Ode to Psyche =

1819 poem written by John Keats

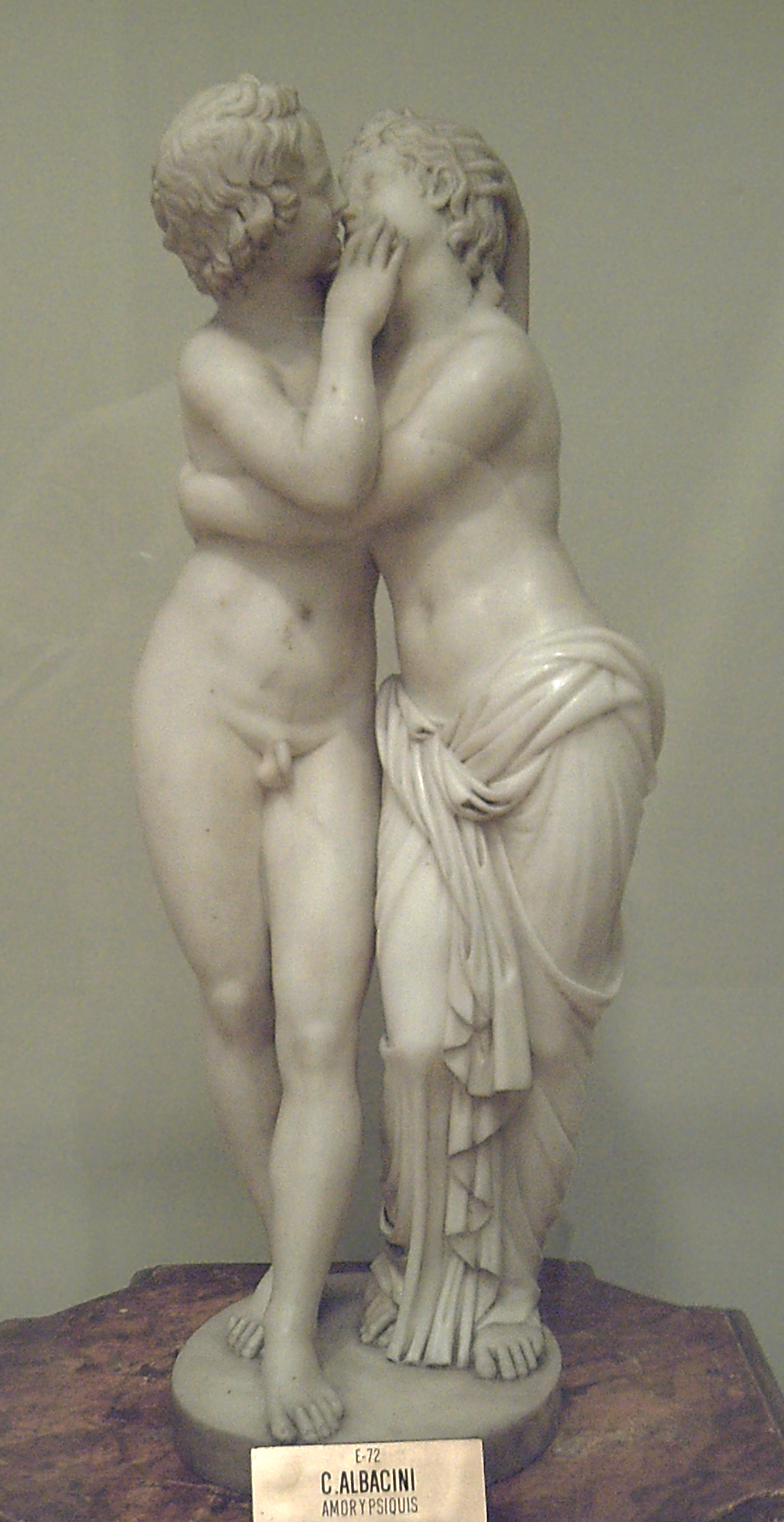
Amor and Psyche, sculpted in marble during the late 18th century

"Ode to Psyche" is a poem by John Keats written in spring 1819. The poem is the first of his 1819 odes, which include "Ode on a Grecian Urn" and "Ode to a Nightingale". "Ode to Psyche" is an experiment in the ode genre, and Keats's attempt at an expanded version of the sonnet format that describes a dramatic scene. The poem serves as an important departure from Keats's early poems, which frequently describe an escape into the pleasant realms of one's imagination. Keats uses the imagination to show the narrator's intent to resurrect Psyche and reincarnate himself into Eros (love). Keats attempts this by dedicating an "untrodden region" of his mind to the worship of the neglected goddess.

== Background ==
Keats was never a professional writer. Instead, he supported himself with a small income that he earned as a surgeon for Guy's Hospital. At the age of 23, Keats left the hospital, losing his source of income, in order to devote himself to writing poetry. He lived with Charles Brown, a friend who collected Keats's poetry while supporting him, during spring 1819 and composed poetry. The early products of this effort included La Belle Dame sans Merci and "Ode to Psyche", the first of a series of odes that he would write that year. It is uncertain as to when the poem was actually completed, but Keats sent the poem to his brother on 3 May 1819 with an attached letter saying, "The following poem, the last I have written, is the first and only one with which I have taken even moderate pains; I have, for the most part, dashed off my lines in a hurry; this one I have done leisurely; I think it reads the more richly for it, and it will I hope encourage me to write other things in even a more peaceable and healthy spirit."

Keats was exposed to a few sources of the Psyche myth. His contemporary sources for the myth included John Lempriere's Classical Dictionary and Mary Tighe's Psyche, an 1805 work that Keats read as a child and returned to in 1818. Keats wrote to his brother George, just a few months before writing "Ode to Psyche", to say that he was no longer delighted by Tighe's writing. Dissatisfied, he turned to Apuleius's Golden Ass, translated by William Adlington in 1566, and read through the earlier version of the Cupid and Psyche myth. After reading the work and realizing that the myth was established during the twilight of Roman mythology, Keats wrote to George: "You must recollect that Psyche was not embodied as a goddess before the time of Apuleius the Platonist who lived after the Augustan age, and consequently the Goddess was never worshipped or sacrificed to with any of the ancient fervour—and perhaps never thought of in the old religion—I am more orthodox than to let a heathen Goddess be so neglected."

== Structure ==
"Ode to Psyche", Keats's 67 line ode, was the first of his major odes of 1819. As such, the poem is an experiment in the ode structure that he was to then rely on for his next five odes. Although Keats spent time considering the language of the poem, the choice of wording and phrasing is below that found within his later works, including Hyperion or the odes that followed. "Ode to Psyche" is important because it is Keats's first attempt at an altered sonnet form that would include longer more lines and would end with a message or truth. Also, he did not want the poem to be based simply around that message, so he incorporated narrative elements, such as plot and characters, along with a preface to the poem. Of these additions, the use of a preface was discontinued in his next odes along with the removal of details that describe setting within the poems; they would only be implied within later odes.

H. W. Garrod, in his analysis of Keats's sonnet form, believes that Keats took various aspects of sonnet forms and incorporated only those that he thought would benefit his poetry. In particular, Keats relies on Petrarch's sonnet structure and the "pouncing rhymes" that are found within Petrarch's octave stanzas. However, M. R. Ridley disputes that Keats favours Petrarch and claims that the odes incorporate a Shakespearean rhyme scheme. Regardless of which sonnet structure was favoured over the other, Keats wanted to avoid the downsides of both forms. "Ode to Psyche" begins with an altered Shakespearean rhyme scheme of ABABCDCDEFFEEF. The use of rhyme does not continue throughout the poem, and the lines that follow are divided into different groups: a quatrain, couplets, and a line on its own. These are then followed by a series of twelve lines that are modelled after the Shakespearean sonnet form, but lack the final couplet. The next lines are of two quatrains, with cddc rhyme, followed by two lines that repeat the previous rhymes, and then a final quatrain, with efef rhyme.

== Poem ==
The poem does not describe the plot of the original Cupid and Psyche myth: according to Harold Bloom, the poem "has little to do with the accepted myth". In the original myth, Aphrodite punishes Psyche, a well admired girl, by having Cupid use his power to make her fall in love. Cupid, instead, falls in love with her, but he could only be with her in the cover of darkness in order to disguise his identity. Curious, she uses a light to reveal Cupid's identity, but he flees from her presence. Psyche begins to search after Cupid, and Aphrodite forces her to perform various tasks before she could be united with her love. After she nearly dies from one of the tasks, Cupid asks Zeus to transform Psyche into a goddess so the two can be together.

The action of "Ode to Psyche" begins with a narrator witnessing two individuals embracing. The narrator immediately recognizes Cupid and is astonished when he recognizes Psyche:

I wander'd in a forest thoughtlessly,
And, on the sudden, fainting with surprise,
Saw two fair creatures, couched side by side
In deepest grass, beneath the whisp'ring roof
Of leaves and trembled blossoms, where there ran
A brooklet, scarce espied:
...
The winged boy I knew;
But who wast thou, O happy, happy dove?
His Psyche true!

— lines 7–12, 21–23

The third stanza describes how Psyche, though a newer Goddess, is better than the other deities. However, she is neglected while the others were worshipped:

O latest born and loveliest vision far
Of all Olympus' faded hierarchy!
Fairer than Phoebe's sapphire-region'd star,
Or Vesper, amorous glow-worm of the sky;
Fairer than these, though temple thou hast none,
Nor altar heap'd with flowers;
Nor virgin-choir to make delicious moan
Upon the midnight hours;

— lines 24–31

The previous list of what Psyche lacks in terms of religious worship only describes external symbols of worship. In the fourth stanza, the narrator emphasizes the internal when he describes how he is inspired by Psyche:

O brightest! though too late for antique vows,
Too, too late for the fond believing lyre,
When holy were the haunted forest boughs,
Holy the air, the water, and the fire;
Yet even in these days so far retir'd
From happy pieties, thy lucent fans,
Fluttering among the faint Olympians,
I see, and sing, by my own eyes inspired.

— lines 36–43

The narrator, inspired by the young goddess, becomes her priest. His imagination allows him to join with both the natural and supernatural elements of Psyche, and his form of worship is within himself while "Ode to Psyche" the poem serves as a song in praise of the goddess. The narrator becomes the prophet for Psyche and says in the final stanza:

Yes, I will be thy priest, and build a fane
In some untrodden region of my mind,
Where branched thoughts, new grown with pleasant pain,
Instead of pines shall murmur in the wind:

— lines 50–53

In the conclusion of the poem, the narrator metaphorically says that he will expand his consciousness, which would allow him to better understand both the good and the bad of the world. This will allow the narrator to attain a new sense of inspiration while providing Psyche with a sanctuary:

And in the midst of this wide quietness
A rosy sanctuary will I dress
With the wreath'd trellis of a working brain,
With buds, and bells, and stars without a name,
With all the gardener Fancy e'er could feign,
Who breeding flowers, will never breed the same:
And there shall be for thee all soft delight
That shadowy thought can win,
A bright torch, and a casement ope at night,
To let the warm Love in!

— lines 58–67

== Theme ==
The moment that Cupid and Psyche are revealed is an example of "Keatsian intensity" as they are neither in a state of separation nor are they united; they exist in a state somewhere in between in a similar manner to the figures depicted in Keats's "Ode on a Grecian Urn". The narrator's ability to witness the union is unique to Keats's version of the Psyche myth because the lovers in the original story were covered in darkness. However, the narrator questions if he was able to see them at all or if he was dreaming. This inability of the narrator to know if he was awake is a theme that appears in many of Keats's odes that followed, including "Ode on Indolence", "Ode on a Grecian Urn", and "Ode to a Nightingale". Regardless of the narrator's state of consciousness, he is able to relate himself to Cupid as he believes himself to be in love with Psyche, representing the mind.

Part of the problem within "Ode to Psyche" is in the narrator's claim that Psyche was neglected since she became a goddess later than the other Greco-Roman deities. As such, the narrator serves as a prophetic figure who is devoted to the soul. Worship towards the soul is through use of the imagination, an idea that shows the influence of William Wordsworth upon the poem's themes. In particular, the lines are reminiscent of the description of inspiration and the muse within Wordsworth's "The Recluse". To serve Psyche, the narrator of "Ode to Psyche" seeks to worship her by thoroughly exploring the regions of his mind. However, the temple dedicated to the goddess within his mind does not yet exist.

This reveals that there is a struggle between the acceptance of imaginative experience that exists only within a small part of the mind. This struggle, according to Walter Evert, has "no relevance to the world of external action and perhaps no truth to offer even the visionary dreamer himself." However Anthony Hecht looks at the problem in a different way and believes that there must be a connection between the external and internal worlds for the narrator to even face the problem. Regardless, the narrator never states that this worship of Psyche or embracing the imagination would aid mankind, but the poem does rejoice in exercising the imagination.

In addition to the theme of dedicating one's self to the mind, the theme of reception plays heavily upon the poem's presentation; Andrew Bennett states that the poem, like all poems, is "'heard' both by itself (and therefore not heard) and by an audience that reads the poem and 'hears' it differently". Bennett implies that the word "wrung" in line one contains a double entendre as it also alludes to the "ringing in the ears" involved with active listening. The poem's treatment of the reader as a third-party to the conversation between the narrator and the goddess exemplifies the narrative question common among many of Keats's odes and leads Bennett to question how exactly the reader should regard his place within the poem, or outside of it.

== Critical reception ==
Responding to the poem, Keats's friend Leigh Hunt declared that "When Mr Keats errs in his poetry, it is from the ill management of the good things,--exuberance of ideas. Once or twice, he does so in a taste positively bad, like Marino or Cowley, as in a line in his 'Ode to Psyche'... but it is once or twice only, in his present volume."

Robert Bridges, turn of the 19th-century literary critic, wrote "for the sake of the last section (l. 50 to end), tho' this is open to the objection that the imagery is work'd up to outface the idea—which is characteristic of Keats' manner. Yet the extreme beauty quenches every dissatisfaction. The beginning of this ode is not so good, and the middle part is midway in excellence." Later, T. S. Eliot thought very highly of Keats's work and wrote "The Odes—especially perhaps the Ode to Psyche—are enough for his reputation."

Kenneth Allott, in defending against any possible harsh criticism of "Ode to Psyche", argues that the poem "is the Cinderella of Keats's great odes, but it is hard to see why it should be so neglected, and at least two poets imply that the conventional treatment of the poem is shabby and undeserved". Allott then cites Bridges and Eliot as views that he sympathizes with, and he believes that the poem "is neither unflawed nor the best of odes, but to me it illustrates better than any other Keats's possession of poetic power in conjunction with what was for him an unusual artistic detachment, besides being a remarkable poem in its own right. This may be another way of saying that it is the most architectural of the odes, as it is certainly the one that culminates most dramatically."

Walter Jackson Bate states that the poem has "always puzzled readers ... But finding the poem so elusive, we return to it only after we know the others far better. If we had hope to use them as keys, we discover they do not quite fit the lock. Meanwhile they have given us a standard hard to equal. Hence we either feel a disappointment about the 'Ode to Psyche' or else, remembering the care Keats supposedly gave it, we once more put the poem aside for future consideration." However, he also states that "The modern, respectful attitude toward this ode is deserved. But the itch for novelty has encouraged a few critics to suggest that the poem, in some dark but fundamental way, has more to it as a whole than do the later odes."

To Harold Bloom, the last lines of Keats's ode "rivals any as an epitome of the myth-making faculty". He elaborates further on this when he writes, "The poem Ode to Psyche is unique, and also central, for its art is a natural growth out of nature, based as it is upon a very particular act of consciousness, which Keats arrests in all its concreteness."
