= Candaules Showing His Wife to Gyges =

Candaules Showing His Wife to Gyges may refer to:

- Candaules Showing His Wife to Gyges (Jordaens), a painting by Jacob Jordaens
- Candaules, King of Lydia, Shews his Wife by Stealth to Gyges, One of his Ministers, as She Goes to Bed, a painting by William Etty
- King Candaules, a painting by Jean-Léon Gérôme
