= Candaules, King of Lydia, Shews his Wife by Stealth to Gyges, One of his Ministers, as She Goes to Bed =

1830 painting by William Etty

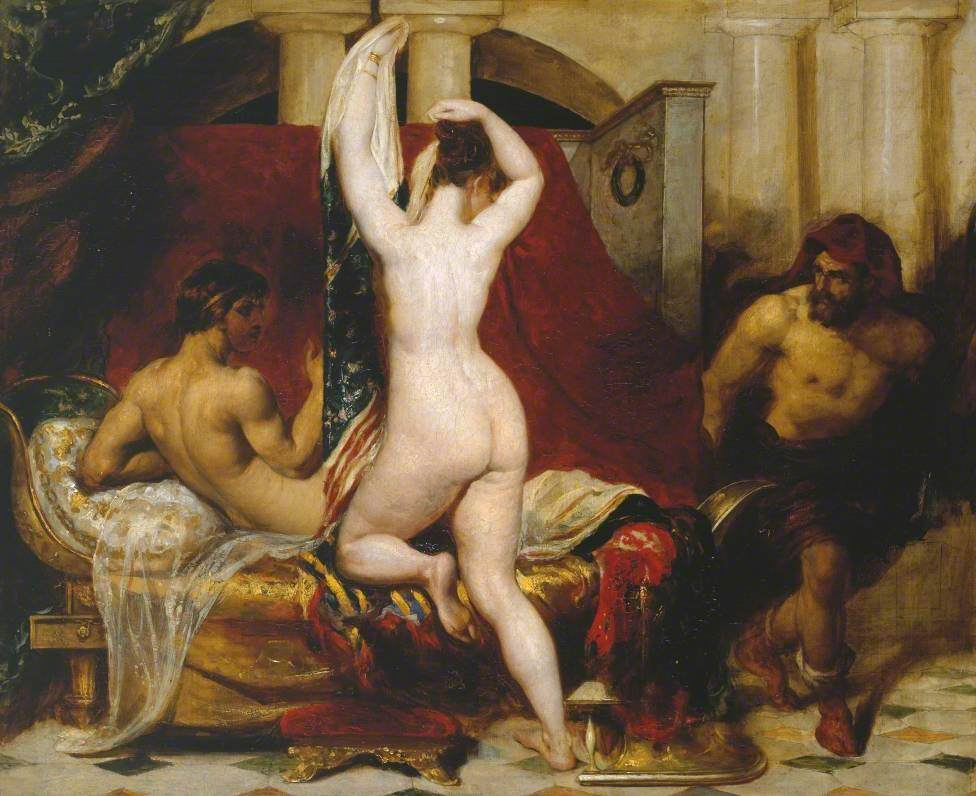
Candaules, King of Lydia, Shews his Wife by Stealth to Gyges, One of his Ministers, as She Goes to Bed

Candaules, King of Lydia, Shews his Wife by Stealth to Gyges, One of his Ministers, as She Goes to Bed, rarely known as The Imprudence of Candaules, is a 45.1 by 55.9 cm (17.8 by 22.0 in) oil painting on canvas by English artist William Etty, first exhibited at the Royal Academy in 1830. It shows a scene from the Histories by Herodotus, in which Candaules, king of Lydia, invites his bodyguard Gyges to hide in the couple's bedroom and watch his wife Nyssia undress, to prove to him her beauty. Nyssia notices Gyges spying and challenges him to either accept his own execution or to kill Candaules as a punishment. Gyges chooses to kill Candaules and take his place as king. The painting shows the moment at which Nyssia, still unaware that she is being watched by anyone other than her husband, removes the last of her clothes.

Etty hoped that his audience would take from the painting the moral lesson that women are not chattels and that men infringing on their rights should justly be punished, but he made little effort to explain this to audiences. The painting was immediately controversial and perceived as a cynical combination of a pornographic image and a violent and unpleasant narrative, and it was condemned as an immoral piece of the type one would expect from a foreign, not a British, artist. It was bought by Robert Vernon on its exhibition, and in 1847 was one of a number of paintings given by Vernon to the nation. The work retained its controversial reputation in later years, and when The Art Journal bought the reproduction rights to Vernon's former collection in 1849 they did not distribute reproductions of Candaules. In 1929 it was among several paintings transferred to the newly expanded Tate Gallery, where as of 2018 it remains.

== Background ==
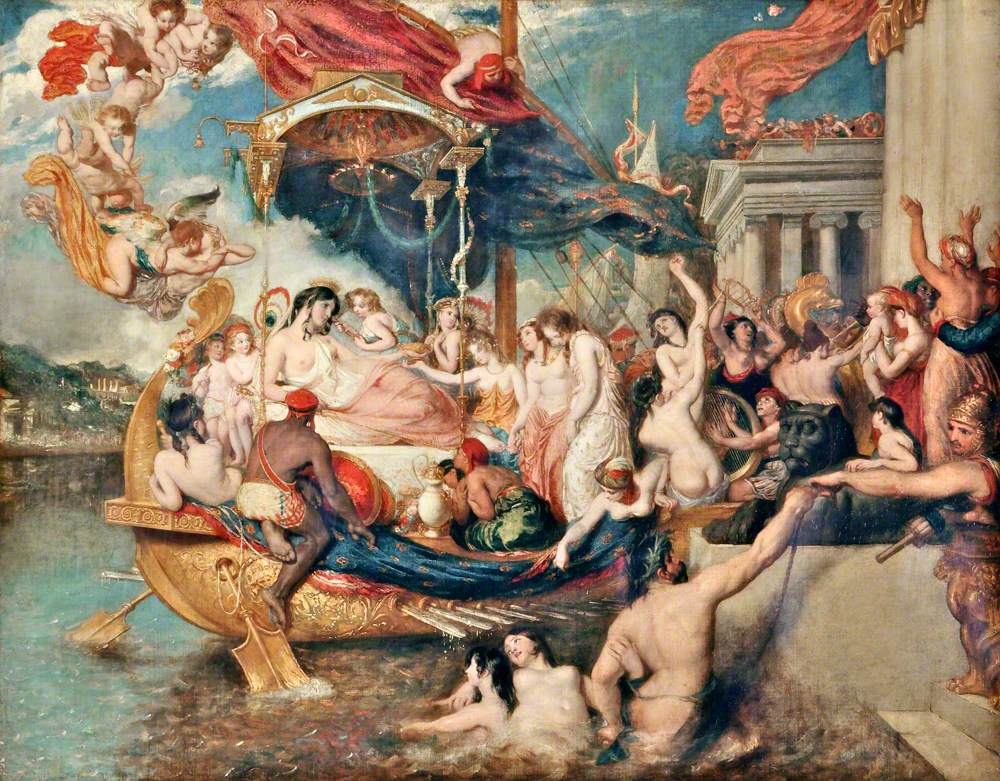
The Arrival of Cleopatra in Cilicia made Etty's reputation as an artist, and its success prompted him to paint further nude figures in historical scenes.

William Etty (1787–1849), the seventh son of a York baker and miller, had originally been an apprentice printer in Hull, but on completing his seven-year apprenticeship at the age of 18 moved to London to become an artist. Strongly influenced by the works of Titian and Rubens, he submitted a number of paintings to the Royal Academy of Arts and the British Institution, all of which were either rejected outright or drew little attention when exhibited. In 1821 he finally achieved recognition when the Royal Academy accepted and exhibited one of his works, The Arrival of Cleopatra in Cilicia (also known as The Triumph of Cleopatra). Cleopatra was extremely well received, and many of Etty's fellow artists greatly admired him. He was elected a full Royal Academician in 1828, beating John Constable to the position.

Following the success of Cleopatra, over the next decade, Etty tried to replicate its success by painting nude figures in biblical, literary and mythological settings. Between 1820 and 1829 Etty exhibited 15 paintings, of which 14 depicted nude figures. While some nude paintings by foreign artists existed in private collections, England had no tradition of nude painting and the display and distribution of nude material to the public had been suppressed since the 1787 Proclamation for the Discouragement of Vice. Etty was the first British artist to specialise in nude studies, and although his portraits of male nudes were generally well received, (Note: Etty's publicly exhibited male nudes were primarily of mythological heroes and classical combat, genres in which the depiction of male nudity was considered acceptable in England.) many critics condemned his repeated depictions of female nudity as indecent.

== Subject ==
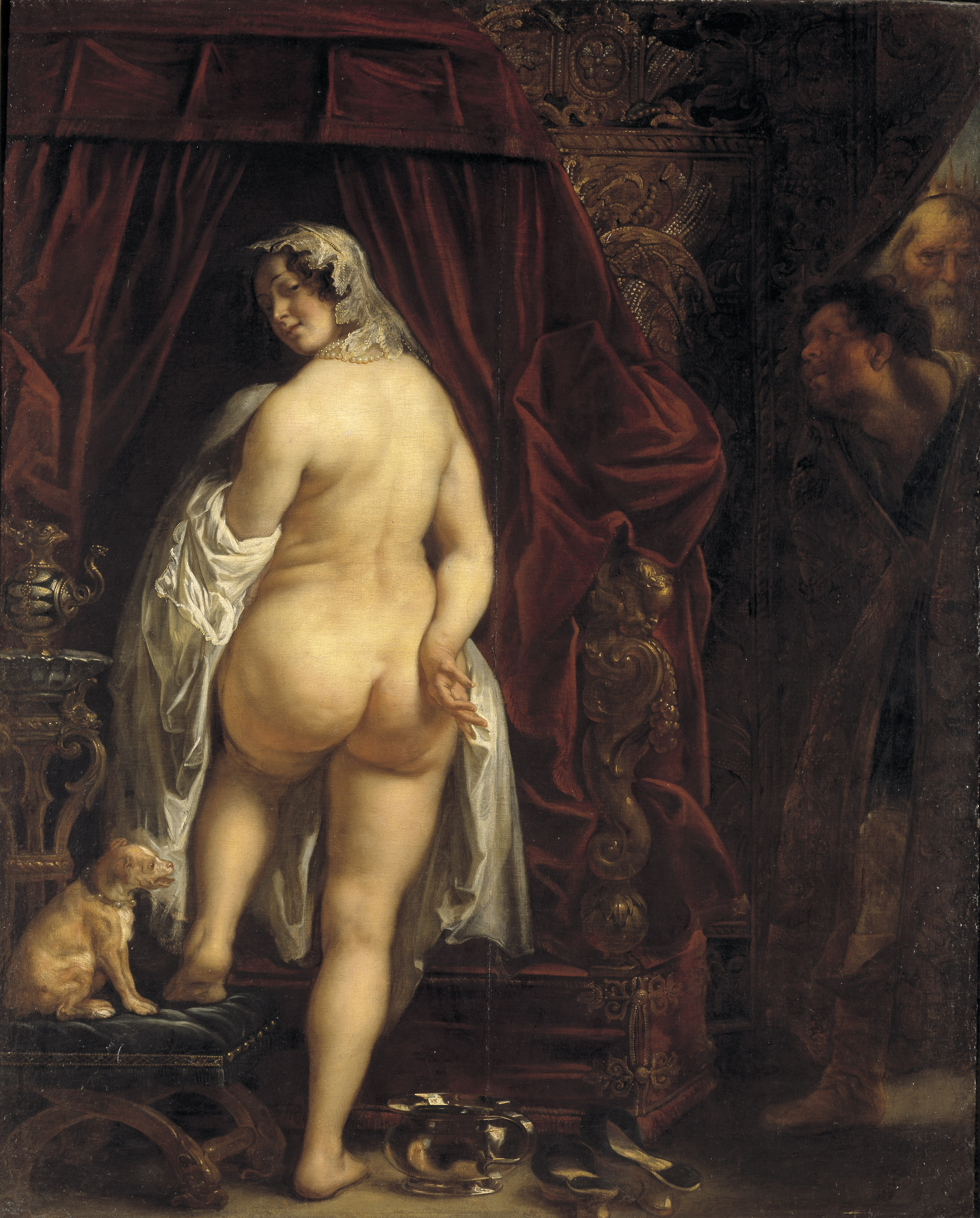
Candaules Showing His Wife to Gyges by Jacob Jordaens, c. 1646. The theme of Candaules, Nyssia and Gyges had previously been painted by Jacob Jordaens in 1646. Jordaens and Etty both contrasted Nyssia's pale flesh against dark red drapery and showed her in a similar pose. Jordaens's painting has hung in Sweden since the 17th century, and it is unlikely Etty was aware of it.

Candaules depicts a scene from the first book of the Histories by Herodotus. Candaules, ruler of the ancient kingdom of Lydia, believed his wife Nyssia to be the world's most beautiful woman. He discussed his wife's beauty with his favourite bodyguard Gyges, but felt Gyges was lying when he told him that he agreed about her beauty. Candaules arranged, over the protests of Gyges, for Gyges to hide behind the bedroom door and watch Nyssia undressing without her knowledge. Although he was unhappy at being forced to take part, Gyges reluctantly hid behind the door and watched Nyssia undress. Nyssia noticed Gyges as he slipped out of the room afterwards, but remained silent.

The next day, Nyssia summoned Gyges and condemned him for his breach of custom in spying on her naked. Gyges was given the choice of killing Candaules for his instigation of the plot, or of voluntarily accepting his own execution; he reluctantly chose to save his own life by murdering his master. The next night, Gyges hid behind the same door from which he had watched the naked Nyssia, and stabbed Candaules while he slept, taking Nyssia as his own wife and declaring himself King of Lydia. The Delphic Oracle confirmed Gyges as king, as the first of the Mermnad dynasty, and he reigned for 38 years.

== Composition ==
Etty's Candaules shows the moment at which Gyges, hiding behind the door, first catches sight of Nyssia's naked body. Candaules lies naked in bed, while Nyssia undresses as she prepares to join him, and Gyges tiptoes around the door to catch a glimpse of her. Nyssia holds a piece of fabric, which forms a vertical line cutting off the body of Candaules at the top of his legs, invoking a theme of emasculation at the hands of a powerful woman. By positioning the figures in such a way that none are looking out of the picture, and the viewer is directly behind Nyssia, Etty intended that the viewer feel the same sense of voyeurism and intrusion that Gyges would have felt, forced to spy on his master's naked wife against his will and without her knowledge. The cluttered arrangement of drapery and architectural features intentionally exaggerates the claustrophobic and implicitly violent nature of the scene.

Etty was a regular attender at the Royal Academy's life class throughout his career. Nyssia stands in a pose which Etty had sketched many times, that of a woman with her knee on a raised plinth and one arm raised holding a hanging rope. (Throughout his career Etty had difficulty painting arms, and generally showed his subjects holding their arms away from their body to expose as much of their torso as possible.) It is possible that Etty intentionally chose the obscure subject of the painting as a pretext to paint a woman in this pose. The picture is painted with an emphasis on colour and texture; as with many Etty works the female figure is painted in more detail than the rest of the canvas, and it is likely Etty painted Nyssia directly from a life model, completing the rest of the composition later in a studio.

Candaules was completed and exhibited at the Royal Academy in 1830. Etty felt that the moral lesson of the story was that women were not the chattels of men and that if men—even their husbands—violated a woman's rights she was within her rights to punish them. However, he made little effort to explain what was, at the time, an unconventional view, instead allowing viewers to form their own judgement of the piece. Thus, unusually for a painting of the time, Candaules appears morally highly ambiguous, inviting the viewer to sympathise either with the sexually immoral Candaules, the murderous Nyssia or the voyeuristic Gyges.

== Reception ==
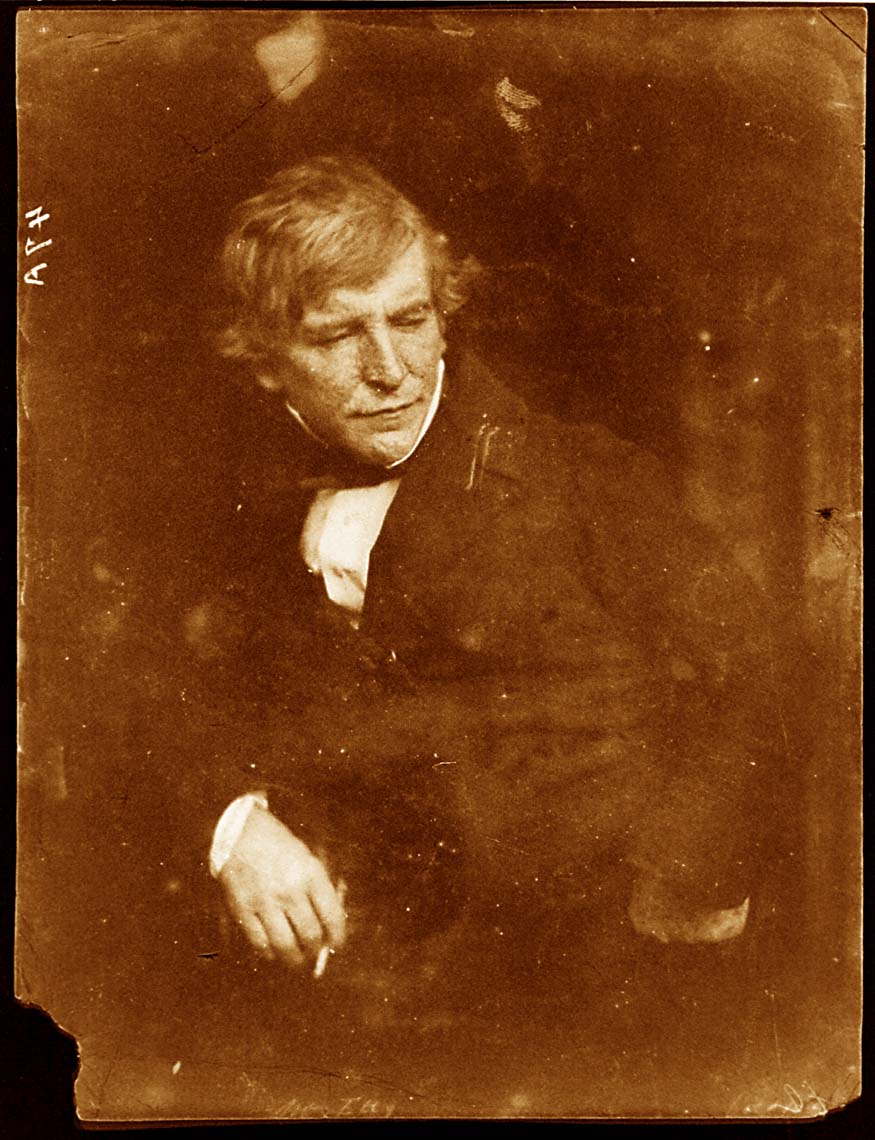
William Etty, 1844

From its unveiling, Candaules was condemned by the press as a cynical combination of a pornographic picture and a violent and unpleasant narrative, and there was near-unanimous consensus that the picture was inappropriate for public exhibition. The Literary Gazette condemned the work as "against decency and good taste", and Etty as tending in Candaules towards the type of "debasing sensuality" one would expect from a foreigner, not the "purer" British school of painting. (Note: "Have we not enough of the voluptuous from the pencils of foreign artists, but is one of our own purer school—a man so capable of better things—to mistake the proper direction of art, and thus to offend against decency and good taste?") The reviewer also criticised the theme of the painting, saying that "as an academic study, the central figure of this group might be admissible; but, in connexion with the disgraceful story, it deserves to be warmly reprehended". La Belle Assemblée, one of Britain's most influential women's magazines, praised Etty's other exhibits at the Summer Exhibition but refused to review Candaules altogether, saying that "to us the subject is so offensive that we pass it over". Even Alexander Gilchrist, generally one of Etty's strongest supporters, in his 1855 biography of Etty described Candaules as "almost the only instance among Etty's works, of an undeniably disagreeable, not to say objectionable subject", while Sarah Burnage of the University of York wrote in 2011 that "it is perhaps hard to see the painting as anything but a deliberate attempt by the artist to shock and scandalise".

== Legacy ==
Despite the hostility with which Candaules was met on its exhibition, it was bought by Robert Vernon, who had made a fortune supplying horses to the military and was using the proceeds to amass a major art collection. Vernon presented his collection to the nation in 1847, although in the case of Candaules a painting so controversial becoming government property was a source of some embarrassment. In 1929 Candaules was transferred to the newly expanded Tate Gallery, where as of 2018 it remains.

The condemnation with which Candaules was met meant it remained a controversial piece. When Samuel Carter Hall was choosing works to illustrate his newly launched The Art Journal, he considered it important to promote new British artists, even if it meant illustrations which some readers considered pornographic or offensive. In 1849 Hall secured reproduction rights to the 157 paintings which Vernon had given to the nation but declined to distribute reproductions of Candaules, despite his willingness to publish reproductions of other provocative Etty nudes such as Female Bathers Surprised by a Swan.

Shortly after Candaules was exhibited Etty, needled by repeated attacks from the press on his supposed tastelessness, indecency and lack of creativity, decided to produce an explicitly moral piece. The result was his 1832 The Destroying Angel and Daemons of Evil Interrupting the Orgies of the Vicious and Intemperate, which was seen by many as a renunciation of his earlier, more openly sensual works. Etty remained a prominent painter of nudes, but from 1832 onwards made conscious efforts to reflect moral lessons. Despite this he continued to be regarded as a pornographer by many, long after his death in 1849; as late as 1882 Vanity Fair was able to comment, "I know only too well how the rough and his female companion behave in front of pictures such as Etty's bather. I have seen the gangs of workmen strolling round, and I know that their artistic interest in studies of the nude is emphatically embarrassing." (Note: "Etty's bather" is a reference to Musidora: The Bather 'At the Doubtful Breeze Alarmed', at that time in the National Gallery and now in Tate Britain.)

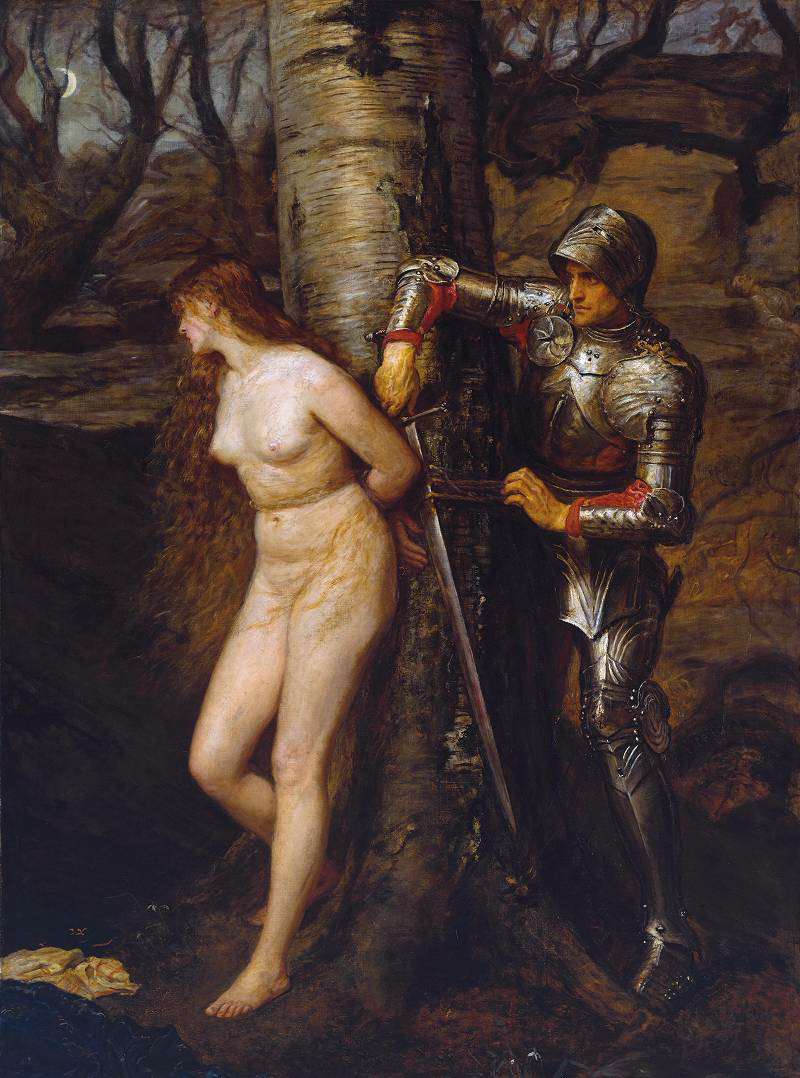
Millais's The Knight Errant is one of the few later works influenced by Candaules.

Interest in Etty declined after his death as new movements, particularly the Pre-Raphaelites and Aestheticism, came to characterise painting in Britain, and by the end of the 19th century the cost of all his paintings had fallen below their original prices. Very few subsequent artists have been influenced by Etty, and one of the few later works on which Candaules can be considered an influence is The Knight Errant, painted by John Everett Millais in 1870, which depicted the rescue of a distraught woman who has been stripped and tied to a tree. The Knight Errant was a return to the style developed by Etty in Candaules of forcing the viewer to feel complicity in witnessing the sexual degradation of a woman, and, particularly in early versions in which the woman's face was visible, (Note: Initially, the victim in The Knight Errant faced forwards. The hostile reception met by The Knight Errant when first painted prompted Millais to cut the female figure's upper part from the canvas and repaint the work with its current appearance, in which the victim turns away from both the viewer and her rescuer and her facial expression cannot be seen. Millais sewed the original face, torso and chains to a canvas showing a coastal scene and painted clothes on the female figure to create an image of the execution of Margaret Wilson, now in the Walker Art Gallery under the title The Martyr of the Solway.) attracted similar criticism. (Note: Prior to the Jack the Ripper murders of 1888, the topic of sexual violence was a taboo subject in Britain, and The Knight Errant was extremely controversial.)
