= Peter Bell the Third =

The Poetical Works of Percy Bysshe Shelley, containing Peter Bell the Third
- The 1839 title page of Peter Bell the Third, revised, second edition, London, England.
- Author: Percy Bysshe Shelley
- Language: English
- Published: 1839
- Publisher: Edward Moxon
- Publication place: England
- Pages: 363

"Peter Bell the Third" is an 1819 satire and parody by the English Romantic poet Percy Bysshe Shelley. The work was not published until 1839 in The Poetical Works of Percy Bysshe Shelley. He used the pseudonym Miching Mallecho, Esq., which is from Shakespeare's Hamlet.

The poem is a parody of William Wordsworth's Peter Bell: A Tale in Verse, published the same year and a satire of his themes and ideas. It features the character of Peter Bell, drawn from Wordsworth's work, as a representation of a poet who compromises his reformist beliefs and ideals for social acceptance and government approval.

Shelley explores Peter's decline and degradation in both morality and spirit in seven sections, illustrating how someone who once experienced deep emotions and passions becomes numb, insipid, uninspired, and complicit with the oppressive forces that harm everyday people through apathy.

It combines satire with humorous and comical parody with political criticism and analysis.

The focus is on social classes and inequalities and the crises of English society in 1819. It is an allegorical narrative that critiques the social and political crises, particularly the moral decay of society and the narrowed and restricted scope of contemporary intellectual discourse and debate when the laws of seditious libel and censorship and suppression were stifling.

== Background ==
It satirises Wordsworth’s didactic story of a potter, Peter Bell, published on 22 April 1819. In the tale, Peter's experiences lead him to renounce his immoral lifestyle.

Prior to its publication, the moralising tone of Wordsworth’s Peter Bell had also been parodied by English poet John Hamilton Reynolds in Peter Bell, A Lyrical Ballad, both published in April.

Then living in Italy, Shelley read about these events in England with interest and decided to write his own version as a third installment, a satire in verse castigating Wordsworth's retreat from his earlier reformist stance. The poem was not published until 1839, seventeen years after Shelley's death.

Peter Bell represents William Wordsworth in Shelley’s work. Shelley takes this character to illustrate what he perceived as Wordsworth's transformation from a radical young poet into a supporter of the conservative government.

Peter Bell is also a more general archetype: The artist who sacrifices genuine emotion and political courage for comfort and acceptance. Shelley, thus, uses the fictional character created by Wordsworth to impugn the author himself.

The tone is both comic and biting, mixing humour with anger and outrage. Shelley employs jokes and mockery, such as the faux scholarly notes, the Devil as a London socialite, Hell as a city guide, but he also shows his wrath at the political betrayal and the corruption of artistic integrity which he sees demonstrated by Wordsworth Shelley views Wordsworth's defection from his reformist past as a significant moral failure.

Shelley wrote Peter Bell the Third in Florence after the Peterloo Massacre, when government cavalry charged into a peaceful crowd of reform protesters in Manchester, resulting in the deaths of at least fifteen people.

By 1819, Wordsworth, who had once supported the French Revolution, had taken a government job as Distributor of Stamps and was writing odes that praised the post-Napoleonic political and social order in England. For Shelley and other radicals, such as Lord Byron, this was an unforgivable betrayal.

It is both a satire and a parody, but satire is more dominant. Parody mimics a specific work for humour, Peter Bell. But his primary target is Wordsworth's life and politics, not just the poem. The satire seeks to criticise his political and moral view.

Shelley wrote the poem in 1819, the year of Peterloo, and his anger towards Wordsworth is tied to his outrage at the government that sanctioned the massacre. In Shelley's view, Wordsworth's support for that government made him complicit in its violence.

This poem is part of a group of Shelley's political writings from 1819, which also features The Mask of Anarchy, "Song to the Men of England", and "England in 1819", that denounced the government for the massacre.

== Publication history ==
Peter Bell the Third was written by Percy Bysshe Shelley in October 1819 under a pseudonym. It was not published in his lifetime due to its satirical and controversial nature because of its attacks not only against Wordsworth personally but English society as a whole. It was first published in 1839 as part of the second edition of his Poetical Works. Some second edition copies had the year "1840" stamped on the title page.

Shelley sent it to Leigh Hunt, on 2 November 1819, to pass Peter Bell the Third to his publisher Charles Ollier for immediate, but anonymous, publication. It was rejected, however, and remained unpublished until 1839.

Peter Bell the Third was added, along with the play Oedipus Tyrannus; or, Swellfoot the Tyrant, to a revised, single volume edition of the 1839 collection published by Edward Moxon in London. The first edition published in four volumes did not contain the work nor Swellfoot the Tyrant. Mary Shelley described the works as different in style from his other works: "They are specimens of the burlesque and fanciful." This was its first publication.

== Summary ==
Dedication: To Thomas Brown, Esq., the Younger, H.F.

Shelley dedicated the poem to his friend, Irish poet Thomas Moore, using a humorous pseudonym, Miching Mallecho, Esq., which comes from Shakespeare's play Hamlet (Act 3, Scene 2), where Hamlet describes the dumb show in the play-within-a-play by saying, "Marry, this is Miching Mallecho; it means mischief".

He employs mock scholarly details such as initials and competing interpretations to establish a satirical tone. Shelley is indicating that the work is a playful game although with a serious undertone.

In the Prologue, he explains that this is the first in a series of accounts of Peter Bell. Peter Bell: A Tale in Verse (1819) was originally presented by William Wordsworth, Peter Bell the First.

John Hamilton Reynolds's parody, Peter Bell, A Lyrical Ballad (1819), was published before Wordsworth's but was based on his knowledge of the Wordsworth work as it appeared in print at that time, Peter Bell the Second.

Shelley's version was the third version of the Peter Bell personage and story, thus, Peter Bell the Third.

The work is divided into seven sections:

1. Part the First: Death / Is yawning to a grave yawn...

In the first section, Peter Bell is stricken by illness, "yellow death lay on his face." The "reformed" Peter Bell now blasphemed and threatened to pull down the earth to hell. A powerful and violent "black storm", bringing lightning, thunder, wind, and hail, assailed him. The Devil came with the storm. He had "bought" Peter Bell "for half-a-crown". After the storm, nothing remained of Peter Bell. He had vanished without a trace.

2. Part the Second: The Devil / The Devil, I safely can aver...

Shelley's depiction of the Devil is different from the traditional view as a hideous, evil fire-and-brimstone villain representing damnation and perdition. He portrays him, instead, as a dapper and respectable and recognisable London gentleman, one who is stylish, mundane, and modern, in tune with the times, contemporary and relevant. This portrayal criticizes the smug, comfortable, respectable evil of the status quo of the establishment rather than presenting a supernatural danger or threat or menace.

The Devil's stylish yet ordinary look takes the drama out of evil, placing it within the everyday settings of dinner parties and social connections. Evil resembles respectability.

"The Devil, I safely can aver,
Has neither hoof, nor tail, nor sting ...
He is -- what we are; for sometimes
The Devil is a gentleman."

The Devil then "called the ghost" out of Peter Bell's corpse. He gave Peter a job and new stylish clothes. He was taken to Hell in the "Devil's chaise".

3. Part the Third: Hell / Hell is a city much like London...

In a powerful image, Shelley envisions Hell as looking exactly like the modern-day London of 1819, teeming with spies, priests, lawyers, and politicians. He uses the comparison to critique the evils of English society in satire that is biting and which stings. He emphasises the repression of the government and the inequality in London.

He infers that Hell is not a supernatural of mythical place but a state of suffering and agony in real time due to social and political oppression caused by inequality, corruption, and authoritarian rule, especially so in the wake of the Battle of Waterloo.

It has little justice and no pity:

"Hell is a city much like London --
A populous and a smoky city;
There are all sorts of people undone,
And there is little or no fun done;
Small justice shown, and still less pity."

4. Part the Fourth: Sin / Peter was dull — he was at first...

Peter's major defect or flaw is not wickedness or premeditated malice. His greatest failing is his complete numbness to moral and imaginative feelings. Shelley contends that this is more dangerous than outright evil, as a dull man can be manipulated by those in power without their even realising it.

Shelley focuses on his dullness, regarding dullness not merely as an aspect of personality but as a moral failing and a political threat. A dullard lacks imagination and passion. He cannot resist authority. He becomes complacent and becomes an instrument of those who wield power.

He laments that dullness is Peter's great sin. Shelley argues that dullness, the suppression of imagination, feeling, and moral awareness, poses a greater danger than outright wickedness. This is because a dull individual can be manipulated by those in power without even realizing it. Peter doesn’t actively choose evil; he simply loses the ability to resist it.

5. Part the Fifth: Grace / Among the guests who often stayed...

Peter lives in aristocratic and literary circles, enjoying 'grace', worldly success, patronage and praise, and affirmation that all desire and want. Shelley argues, however, that this grace is more of a corruption than a true blessing. As Peter attains more power, he moves farther from authentic poetry. He becomes debased.

6. Part the Sixth: Damnation / Even the Preacher, who had kept...

Peter's damnation is complete. He supports the oppressive and authoritarian government, which perpetrated the Peterloo Massacre. He views Carnage as an instrument of God, quoting from Wordsworth's "Thanksgiving Ode". Like Wordsworth himself, Peter has abandoned the reformist and progressive views of his youth. He has become reactionary and conservative in his outlook, favouring the status quo.

The quotation from Wordsworth's "Thanksgiving Ode" (1816) is used by Shelley to show that he has endorsed the use of violence and force by the government. Carnage is depicted as God's daughter by Wordsworth.

The significance of the line "Yea, Carnage is Thy daughter!" is to show Wordsworth's advocacy of violence and war by maintaining that it is divinely ordained and sanctioned.

Shelley quotes directly from the "Thanksgiving Ode", where Wordsworth portrays God as using mass slaughter to enact divine will. For Shelley, this line showcases Wordsworth's total moral decline, he has transformed from celebrating human freedom to endorsing state violence.

7. Part the Seventh: Double Damnation / The Devil now knew his proper cue...

In the last section, Peter is abandoned by the corrupt powers he has served. His soul delivers the poem's last bitter irony, a reminder that he will also be left behind. The poem concludes not with redemption but with the utter emptiness of a life devoted to seeking respectability.

"Peter was dull -- he was at first
Dull -- oh, so dull -- so very dull!
Whether he talked, wrote, or rehearsed --
Still with this dulness was he cursed --
Dull -- beyond all conception -- dull."

A "disease soon struck into/ The very life and soul of Peter." The "pest of dulness" controls him, to his soul the "spell" is bound, a "strange and horrid curse". He is rejected by all, his family, his friends, his associates. There is no consolation or salvation.

== Sources ==
- Bateson, F. W. "Exhumations V. Shelley on Wordsworth: Two Unpublished Stanzas from Peter Bell the Third." Essays in Criticism 17.2 (1967): 125-129.
- Behrendt, Stephen C. "‘Peter Bell the Third’: Contempt and Poetic Transfiguration." The Unfamiliar Shelley. Routledge, 2016. 101-118.
- Coffey, Bysshe Inigo. "Shelley’s Kant, Wordsworth, and Peter Bell." The Wordsworth Circle 49.3 (2018): 167-176.
- Gohn, Jack Benoit. "Did Shelley Know Wordsworth's Peter Bel?." Keats-Shelley Journal 28 (1979): 20-24.
- Gosse, Edmund. "Peter Bell and His Tormentors." In Gossip in a Library. London: W. Heinemann. 1891.
- Hall, Jean. "Poetic Autonomy in Peter Bell the Third and The Witch of Atlas." The New Shelley: Later Twentieth-Century Views. London: Palgrave Macmillan UK, 1991. 204-219.
- Lindstrom, Eric. "To Wordsworth" and the "White Obi": Slavery, Determination, and Contingency in Shelley's Peter Bell the Third." Studies in Romanticism 47.4 (2008): 549-580.
- Marsh, George L. "The 'Peter Bell' Parodies of 1819." Modern Philology 40.3 (1943): 267-274.
- Petrarch, Boccaccio, Shakespeare Chaucer, and Lord Calderon. "Shelley's Peter Bell the Third: Relationship and the Canon." Evaluating Shelley (2019): 164.
- Rawson, Claude. "Byron Augustan: Mutations of the Mock-Heroic in Don Juan and Shelley’s Peter Bell the Third." Byron: Augustan and Romantic. London: Palgrave Macmillan UK, 1990. 82-116.
- Shelley, Percy Bysshe. "From Peter Bell the Third, Percy Bysshe Shelley (1819)." Parodies of the Romantic Age. Vol 2. Routledge, 2020. 201-212.
- Williams, John. "Wordsworth, Shelley, and the Riddle of Peter Bell." Romanticism 23.1 (2017): 75-87.
