= Nocturnal Appearance =

Painting by Jacob Jordaens

Nocturnal Appearance or Night Vision
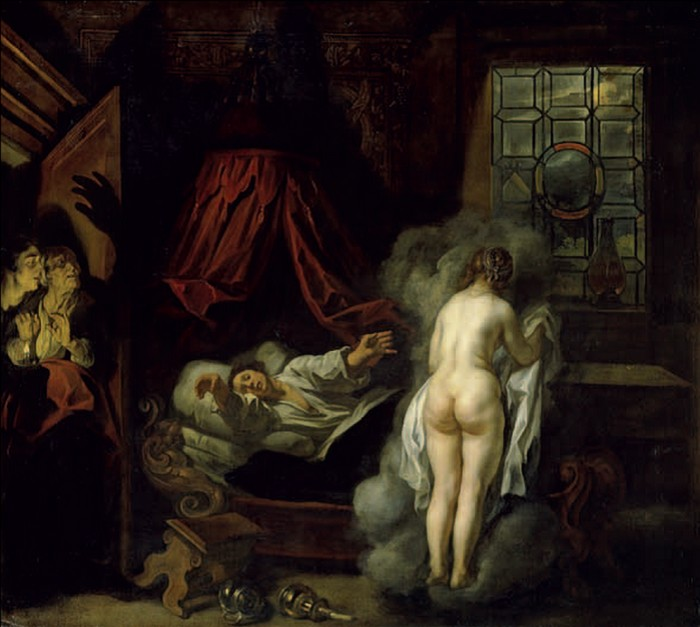
- Artist: Jacob Jordaens
- Year: c. 1650
- Type: Oil on canvas
- Dimensions: 133 cm × 144 cm (52 in × 57 in)
- Location: Staatliches Museum Schwerin, Schwerin

Nocturnal Appearance or Night Vision is a painting made by Jacob Jordaens around 1650. It is in the collection of the Staatliches Museum Schwerin (accession number G 161).

== History and description ==
The title of the painting is also given as A dream. The meaning and subject of the painting depicting a nude woman seen from the back in a dark bedroom with a man asleep on a bed and two onlookers behind a half open door are still a matter of contention among art historians. A second version of the painting was at the Thore (Burger) sale in Paris in 1892, then in the van Hall sale in Antwerp in 1836 and finally in 1905 it was in Paris with art dealer Franz Kleinberger who exhibited it in Antwerp.

In a dark room a man is asleep in bed while on his right is a naked female figure seen from behind standing on a cloud. In front of her the woman is holding a white cloth, which she lifts up with one hand, while the other hand keeps it against her body. The sleeper in his dream or because he has woken up has upset the pedestal table near his bed, causing a candle stick and a pot (or jug) to fall to the floor. To the left a man and a woman are watching the scene with expressions of surprise. The male spectator is carrying a lit candle which casts upon his head and that of the woman a warm light, and causes the shadow of his hand to fall on the panel of the open door.

Stylistically, Jordaens appears to have been influenced by Adam Elsheimer in the use of candlelight as a main light source and by Caravaggio's tenebrism.

== Interpretation ==
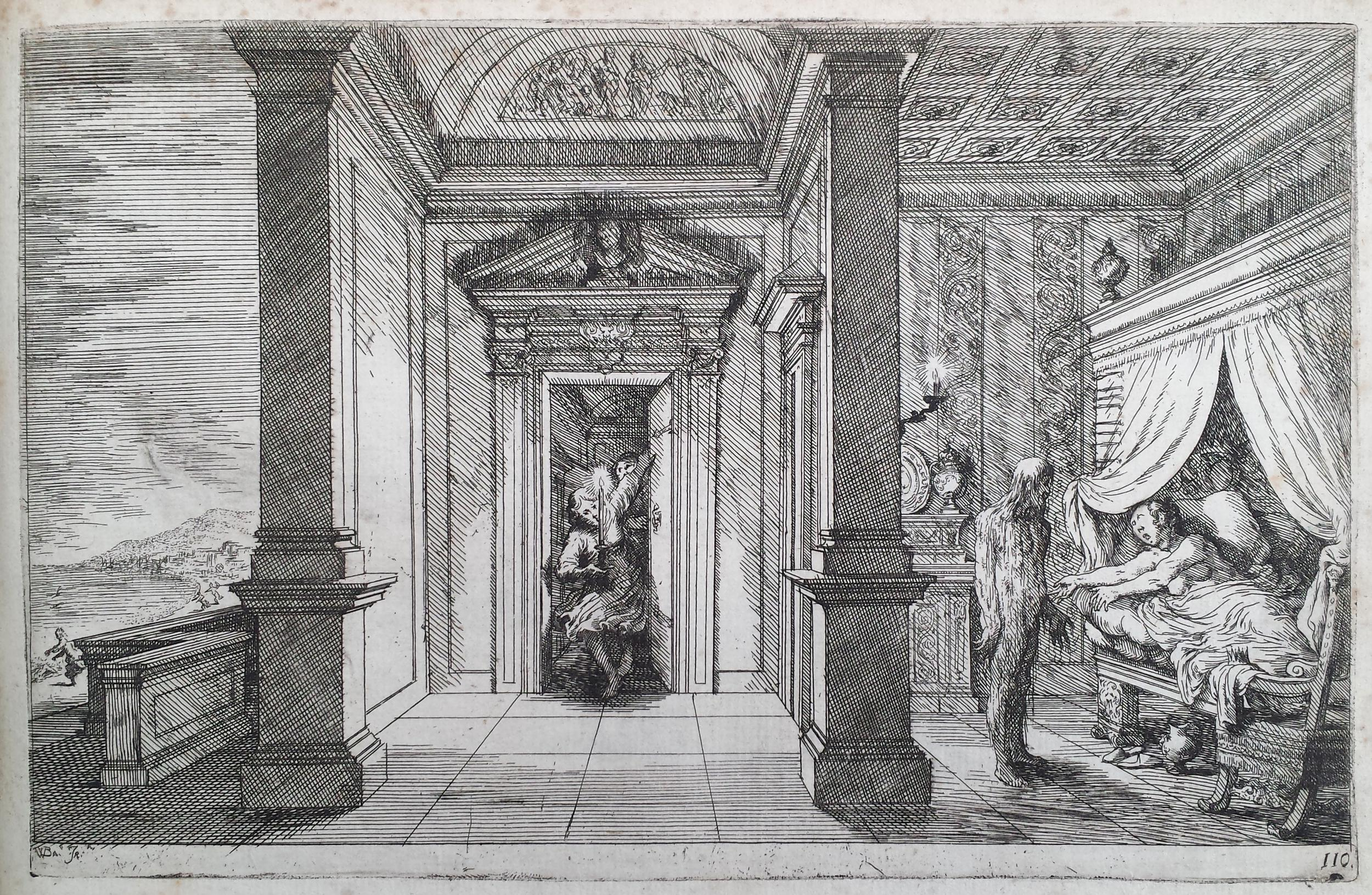
Morpheus before Alcyone by Johann Wilhelm Baur

Erwin Bielefel argued that the painting most likely depicts a story written by Phlegon of Tralles for the Roman Emperor Hadrian, to which Jordaens may have had access through a translation or a contemporary adaptation. The story tells the tale of a young man, Marchete, who stays as a guest of a wealthy couple. During the night, Marchete's slumber is disturbed when he dreams of Philinion, the couple's daughter who had died a few months before. Grasping the cloth her corpse was wrapped in, Philinion, in the guise of a vampire, asks to bed with Marchete. Awoken by sounds coming from the room, Philinion's mother, Charito, comes to investigate with the aid of a maidservant. Upon entering the room, they are horrified by the sight of the deceased daughter. According to Bielefeld, Jordaens' Nocturnal appearance follows closely Phlegon's story and depicts the decisive moment or climax of the ancient tale.

Julius S. Held disagreed with Bielefeld by pointing out that the painting differs in many ways from the story of Marchete and Philinion told by Phlegon. He points out that in Phlegon's story Philinion appears to Marchete while he is awake and not in his dream. Further, unlike in Phlegon's story where the spectators are a maid and the mother, the spectators in Jordaens' canvas are a man and a woman. Held suggests that the composition possibly represents the story of Alcyone and Ceyx as told by the Roman poet Ovid in his Metamorphoses. Jordaens may have seen a representation of it in a print by Johann Wilhelm Baur for the 1641 illustrated edition of the Metamorphoses. In the print Morpheus, the god of dreams, appears in the shape of her dead husband Ceyx to Alcyone lying at night on her bed. She thus realises that her husband has drowned. A male and a female servant are shown entering the room, the man holding a candle. Jordaens' painting is closer to the story and imagery of this depiction of Ovid's story than to the story of Marchete and Philinion. Held also holds out the possibility that the painting does not depict a specific story but is rather a picture with an erotic intention and no specific literary source. It could be a depiction of an erotic dream about a woman. A candle and pot (or jug) in proximity to each other often referred to sexual intercourse in Netherlandish paintings such as in the bride paintings of Marten van Cleve and Jan Massijs. Held further refers to comments made by the painter Gerard de Lairesse who had seen the painting in the second half of the 17th century. De Lairesse recounts in his Groot Schilderboek that he and others were of the view that the painting was simply a painting of a nude model to which other elements were added solely to complete the picture.

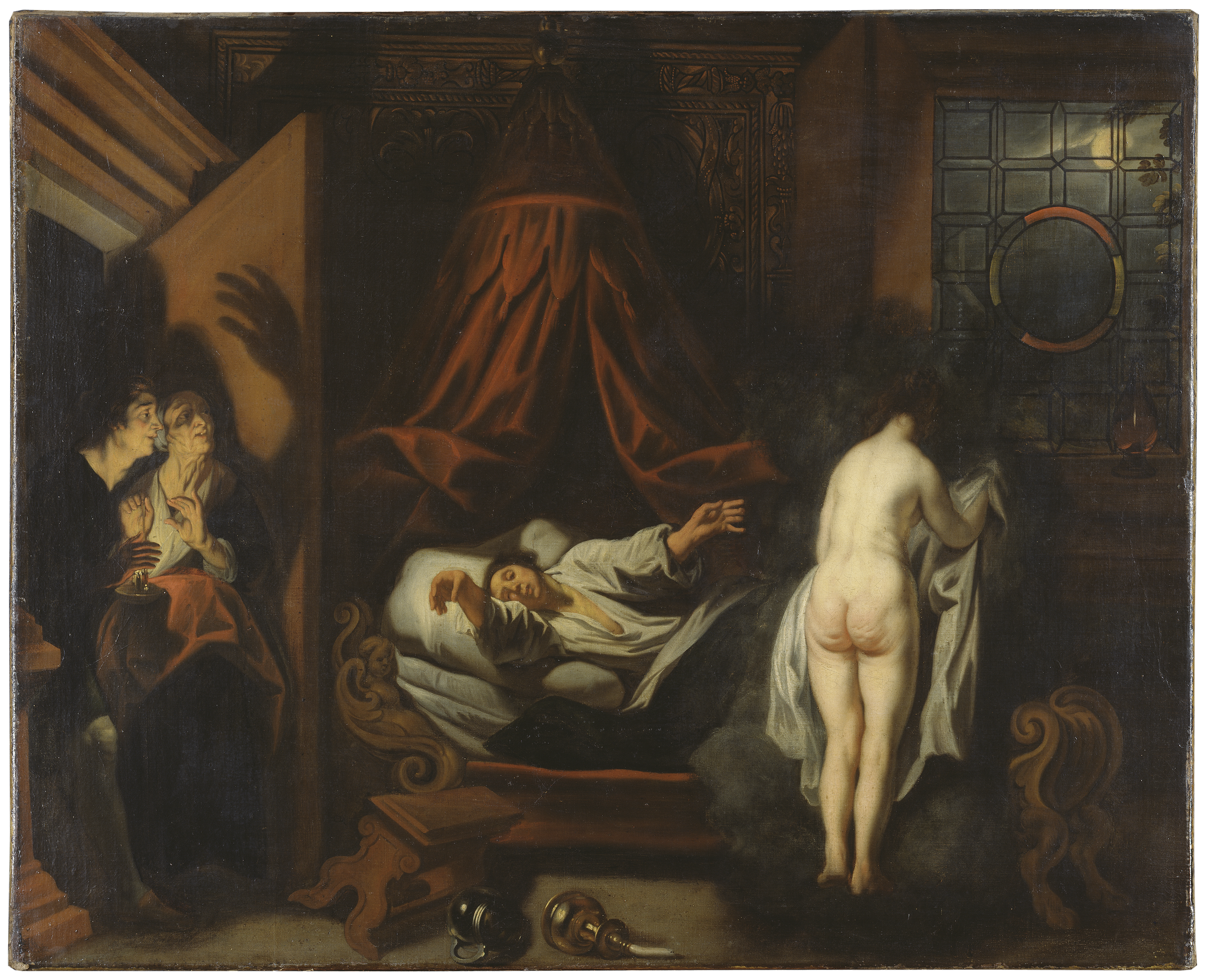
The Dream (The Corinthian Bride) at the Nationalmuseum

== Dating ==
The painting is believed to have been painted somewhere between 1640 and 1660 and probably around 1650. It is regarded as being linked to Jordaens' Candaules Showing His Wife to Gyges, which is dated 1646. The nude woman in the painting may successfully challenge the wife of Candaules by the splendour of the painting.

== History of the painting ==
The work was with art dealer Gerhard Morell in Copenhagen/Hamburg. It entered the private collection of Christian Ludwig II, Duke of Mecklenburg-Schwerin in Schwerin Castle. It became part of the collection of the Staatliches Museum Schwerin before 1752.

A slightly smaller, second version of the painting (present location unknown) was at the Thore (Burger) sale (Paris 1892) and in the van Hall sale (Antwerp, 1836). In 1905 it was in Paris with art dealer Franz Kleinberger who exhibited it in Antwerp. It may be the work in the Nationalmuseum, Stockholm referred to as The Dream or The Corinthian Bride and attributed to 'manner of Jacob Jordaens'. The Corinthian Bride is the title of a balad of Goethe (1797), which reworks the story of Marchete and Philinion.
