= The Destroying Angel and Daemons of Evil Interrupting the Orgies of the Vicious and Intemperate =

1832 painting by William Etty

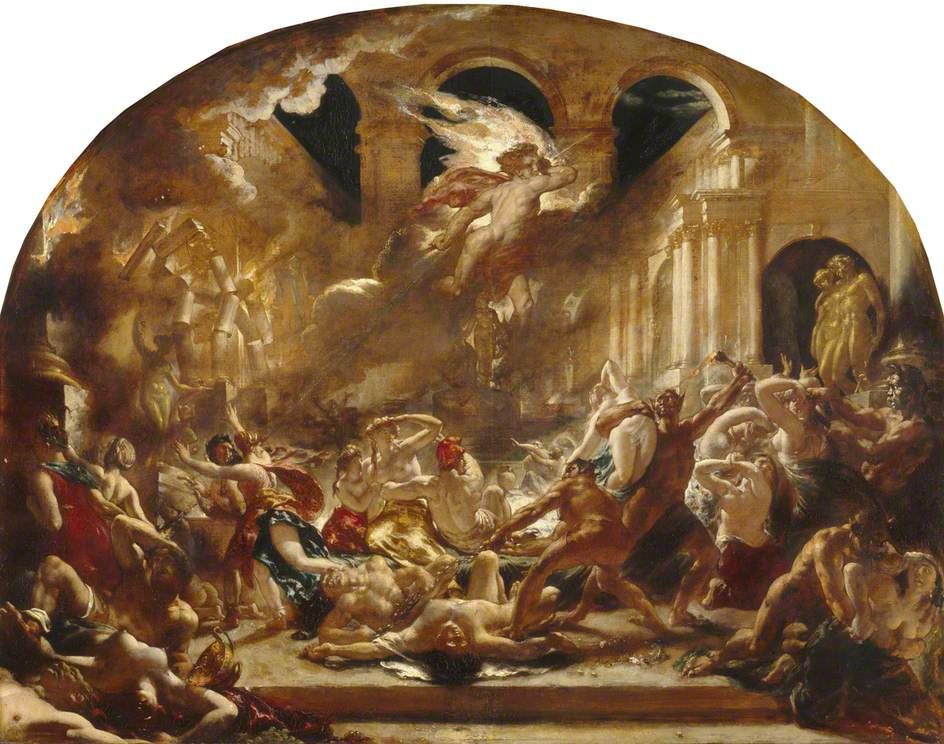
The Destroying Angel and Daemons of Evil Interrupting the Orgies of the Vicious and Intemperate

The Destroying Angel and Daemons of Evil Interrupting the Orgies of the Vicious and Intemperate, also known as The Destroying Angel and Daemons Inflicting Divine Vengeance on the Wicked and Intemperate and as The Destruction of the Temple of Vice, is an 1832 English oil painting on canvas by English artist William Etty, first exhibited in 1832. Etty had become famous for nude paintings, and acquired a reputation for tastelessness, indecency and a lack of creativity. With The Destroying Angel he hoped to disprove his critics with an openly moral piece. The painting is 127.8 cm by 101.9 cm (50 in by 40 in) and depicts a classical temple under attack from a destroying angel and a group of daemons. Some of the humans appear dead or unconscious, others flee or struggle against the daemons.

When first exhibited in 1832, The Destroying Angel was widely praised for its technical brilliance, but critics were divided on the subject matter. Some praised its vivid blend of fear and beauty; others criticised its theme as inappropriate, and chastised Etty for wasting his talent. As Etty had hoped, the painting changed critics' perception of him; some saw it as indicating previously unseen depths, others considered it a renunciation of his previous work. Henry Payne, who had commissioned the painting, sold it in 1854 to Sir Joseph Whitworth. Whitworth donated it in 1882 to the Manchester Art Gallery, where it remains.

== Background ==
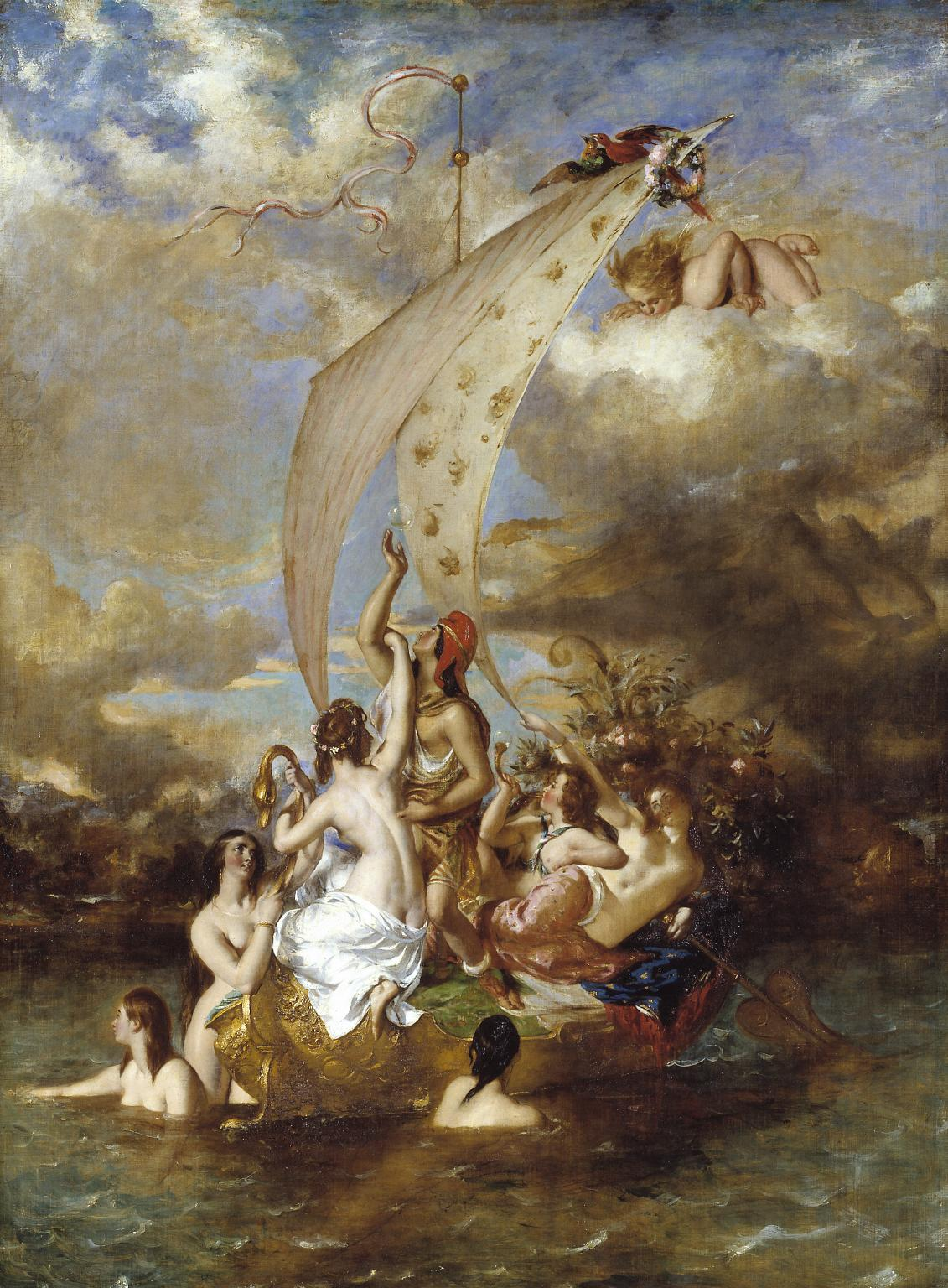
Youth on the Prow, and Pleasure at the Helm was described by The Morning Chronicle as "an indulgence of what we once hoped a classical, but which are now convinced, is a lascivious mind".

William Etty (1787–1849), the seventh son of a York baker and miller, had originally been an apprentice printer in Hull, but on completing his seven-year apprenticeship at the age of 18 moved to London to become an artist. Strongly influenced by the works of Titian and Rubens, he became famous for painting nude figures in biblical, literary and mythological settings. Many of his peers greatly admired him, and he was elected a full Royal Academician in 1828, ahead of John Constable.

Between 1820 and 1829 Etty exhibited 15 paintings, of which 14 depicted nudes. While some nude paintings by foreign artists existed in private collections, England had no tradition of nude painting and the display and distribution of nude material to the public had been suppressed since the 1787 Proclamation for the Discouragement of Vice. Etty was the first British artist to specialise in the nude, and the reaction of the lower classes to these paintings caused concern throughout the 19th century. Although his portraits of male nudes were generally well received, (Note: Etty's male nude portraits were primarily of mythological heroes and classical combat, genres in which the depiction of male nudity was considered acceptable in England.) many critics condemned his repeated depictions of female nudity as indecent. Etty's Youth on the Prow, and Pleasure at the Helm, completed in 1830 and exhibited in 1832, attracted scathing criticism for its supposed seductive and sensual nature, leading The Morning Chronicle to comment that "[Etty] should not persist, with an unhallowed fancy, to pursue Nature to her holy recesses. He is a laborious draughtsman, and a beautiful colourist; but he has not taste or chastity of mind enough to venture on the naked truth."

Needled by repeated attacks from The Morning Chronicle on his supposed indecency, poor taste and lack of creativity, Etty determined to produce a work that would prove his detractors wrong. The result was The Destroying Angel and Daemons of Evil Interrupting the Orgies of the Vicious and Intemperate.

The Destroying Angel was commissioned by Henry Payne of Leicester in 1822, on a promise of 60 guineas (about £6,900 in today's terms) when complete. Payne had granted Etty complete freedom in the creation of the piece, but Etty had done little with the notion until, stung by The Morning Chronicle's criticism, he decided to return to the theme, completing it in 1832. As Etty had become a more prominent painter in the meantime, Payne paid him £130 (about £13,000 in today's terms) for the piece. The work is thought to have been inspired by the works of John Milton and Alexander Pope, by Michelangelo's The Last Judgment and possibly by the French Revolution of 1830, in which Etty had been caught up during a visit to Paris to study in the Louvre. The topic was one to which Etty felt particularly close, saying that he had put his "whole soul" into the piece.

== Composition ==
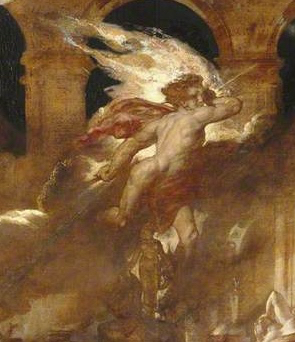
The angel is wreathed in smoke, and is poised to throw a thunderbolt.

The Destroying Angel is a visionary work, depicting a wholly imaginary scene rather than a scene from history, literature or mythology. (Note: The catalogue for the 1832 Summer Exhibition described The Destroying Angel and Daemons of Evil Interrupting the Orgies of the Vicious and Intemperate as "a finished sketch of that class of compositions called by the Romans Visions, not having their origin in history or poetry.") It measures 127.8 cm by 101.9 cm (50 in by 40 in), and depicts an ornate imaginary classical temple. The temple and its occupants are under attack from a destroying angel and a group of daemons, who are in the process of abducting its human occupants. The angel itself is wreathed in smoke in the centre of the image. Having destroyed one side of the temple, it is poised to hurl a thunderbolt. Below the angel, daemons attack a group of around 25 semi-naked human figures. Each human is shown in a different position and expresses terror differently, and each is deliberately painted in paler tones than those Etty typically used to suggest death and pallor. As with most of Etty's works, the figures are a collection of depictions of models in studio poses, later arranged for dramatic effect, rather than painted as a group.

To the right of the painting, daemons drag terrified women away. The woman in the lower right-hand corner turns to see flames reflected in the eyes of the daemon who holds her from behind, with a look of horrified guilt on her face. Behind her, other women struggle helplessly with the daemons or are carried away unconscious, having fainted.

In the centre of the foreground is a figure modelled on Caius Gabriel Cibber's Raving Madness, which at the time was one of two monumental sculptures above the entrance to Bethlem Hospital ("Bedlam"), and a well-known London landmark and symbol of insanity. (Note: Raving Madness and its companion Melancholy Madness remain in the care of Bethlem Hospital, and currently, flank the grand staircase of the Bethlem Museum of the Mind.) The chained figure is contorted in agony struggling to escape his bonds, while a daemon pulls on one end of the chain. Beside this lunatic is an unconscious or dead gambler, his winnings spread on the floor beside him.

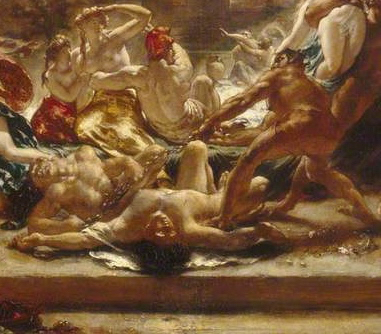
A daemon drags a chained and writhing lunatic across the body of a gambler, while startled figures in the background turn to see the destruction.

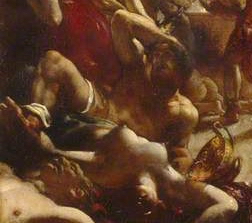
The terrified drunkard, conscious of the fate awaiting him if he remains but too drunk to flee, echoes the pose of the Barberini Faun.

Behind the central images of the lunatic, daemon and gambler are a group of people who have only just realised what is happening. A male figure in a red Phrygian cap (a symbol of the French and American Revolutions) reclines with his arm around the waist of a female figure (identified as a bacchante by Sarah Burnage of the University of York). The female figure shades her eyes, either against the brightness of the angel or to block out the horror taking place in front of her.

On the left-hand side of the painting, in the background, the structure of the temple crumbles and burns in the wake of the angel's path, while figures in varying stages of undress flee the approaching daemons. In the foreground a drunken man mimics the pose of the Barberini Faun as he clutches his head, alert enough to realise his fate if he does not escape but too intoxicated to flee.

Around the painting lie corpses in various states of undress. The Destroying Angel was painted shortly after Etty's visit to Paris in which he had witnessed the July Revolution at first hand, and the sight and smell of the dead in the streets had left a strong impression on him. The heaped bodies in The Destroying Angel were probably directly inspired by the events Etty had witnessed in France, and perhaps also by the cholera epidemic which killed thousands in London in 1832.

== Reception ==
The Destroying Angel was first exhibited at the Royal Academy Summer Exhibition in 1832. It immediately generated much critical and public interest, and was compared favourably with The Fall of the Damned by Peter Paul Rubens, Michelangelo's The Last Judgment and "Breughell's frightful fancies".

We wish especially, that one of Mr. Etty's high and deserved estimation would give the world only what shall tend to improve the public taste in morals as well as in art ... and when we remember his 'Guardian Angels' and other works of that class, we are at no loss to quote an authority, when we have his own against himself; and turn with a feeling of regret from such works as some he has exhibited this and the last year of a different character. Even the 'Demons and Destroying Angels', though it seems to point to a moral, is somewhat of too pantomimic an effect, and is calculated to excite any but such ideas as we should wish to see produced by Art.

— The Library of the Fine Arts review of the Royal Academy Summer Exhibition, 1832

Although the painting was celebrated as a technical accomplishment, some critics were uncertain if it had the correct moral effect. The Library of the Fine Arts was critical of its "pantomimic" quality, which it considered "calculated to excite any but such ideas as we should wish to see produced by Art", while The Examiner complained about the depiction of women being attacked, arguing: "Mr Etty should not treat the fair sex in this harsh and wanton manner. We doubt his right to put a single one of them into the hands of a Demon, much less to deliver them over by the dozen to the grasp of the destroyers." The Times said,

We do not profess to understand what class of compositions that is which originates neither in history nor poetry—no doubt Mr. Etty does; but as far as we can comprehend his picture, which is much more intelligible than his language, it represents a quantity of able-bodied demons, who appear angry at the ladies for having stayed out so long, and who are come to fetch them home accordingly

and criticised Etty for a "slovenly manner" and for "abusing his rich gifts, and [wasting] upon the wild and unmeaning what might be made subservient to much more worthy purposes". Despite this, the same critic conceded that "The work is one of extraordinary power" and that "The figures are drawn with exquisite skill, the grouping admirably varied, and yet so combined as to present a complete picture, and the colouring vigorous and harmonious in an eminent degree."

Other critics admired Etty's unusual interpretation of apocalyptic religious imagery, his ability to give distinct characters and shapes to the individual demons and their victims, and the vividness of his imagination. The Morning Post particularly praised Etty's ability to convey "creation conceived and thrown upon the canvas with all the fury of poetical inspiration" by combining the "dauntless spirit of a sketch" with the "powerful impression of a finished picture". The prominent art critic William Paulet Carey (writing under the name of 'Ridolfi') championed The Destroying Angel, and in particular Etty's ability to balance beauty, horror and fear without descending into tastelessness. Carey saw Etty as proof that British artistic traditions were equal to any others in the world, and The Destroying Angel as evidence of Etty's "redeeming grace and spirit". Etty's long-standing adversaries at The Morning Chronicle found little to attack in the painting, their review stating that "The upper part of the picture is masterly, grand and beautiful. The lower part not so well, but some of the figures are in admirable action and fine drawing." The reticence of The Morning Chronicle prompted Carey to comment that they were in "envious silence".

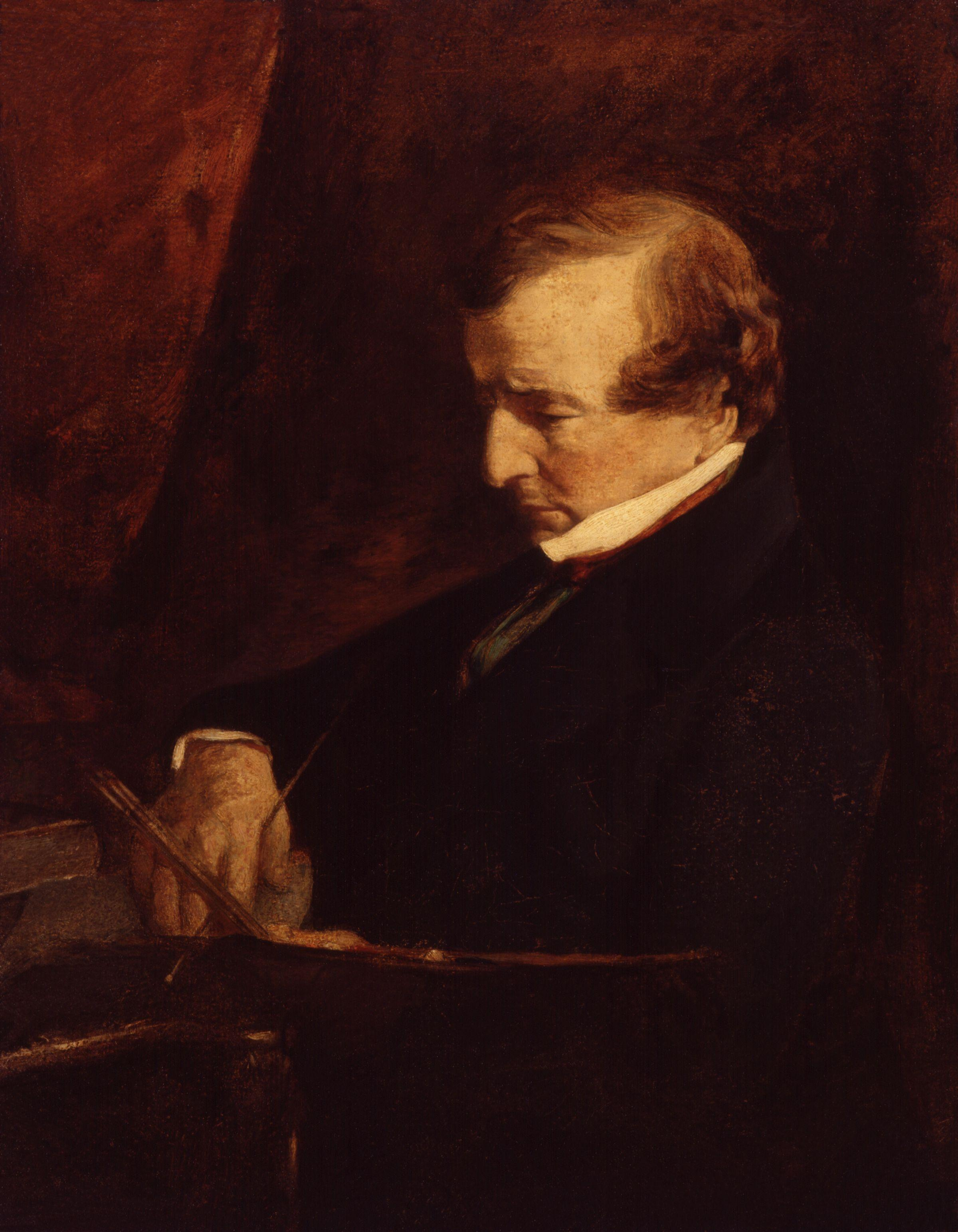
William Etty in 1844

Despite some criticism, The Destroying Angel changed the way Etty was perceived by critics. They commonly had viewed Etty's works as insights into his mind, generally with the aim of discrediting him for supposed sexual deviancies. Confronted with a piece so obviously intended to convey a moral lesson, many of those same critics felt that Etty had revealed a more moral nature than they had previously believed. Many explicitly saw The Destroying Angel as a counterweight to the nude paintings for which Etty was famous, or even a representation of Etty's own repentance for or renunciation of his previous works. Fraser's Magazine described the painting as "a sermon to [Etty's] admirers ... where he inflicts poetical justice upon his own gay dames and their gallants, their revels being broken in upon, and they themselves being carried off most unceremoniously, like that little gentleman Don Juan, by sundry grim-looking brawny devils".

== Legacy ==
After 1832, Etty exhibited over 80 more paintings at the Summer Exhibition. He remained a prominent painter of nudes, but from this time made conscious efforts to reflect moral lessons. Yet he remained, in the majority view, a pornographer. Charles Robert Leslie observed shortly after Etty's death that "[Etty] himself, thinking and meaning no evil, was not aware of the manner in which his works were regarded by grosser minds". Etty remained commercially successful in his lifetime, amassing £17,000 (about £1,900,000 in today's terms) by his death.

Etty died in 1849, and his work enjoyed a brief boom in popularity. Interest in him declined over time, and by the end of the 19th century the cost of all his paintings had fallen below their original prices. Henry Payne sold The Destroying Angel in 1854 for 770 guineas (about £77,000 in today's terms) to Sir Joseph Whitworth, who donated it in 1882 to the Manchester Art Gallery, where it remains. The painting was exhibited as part of a major retrospective of Etty's work at the York Art Gallery in 2011–12.

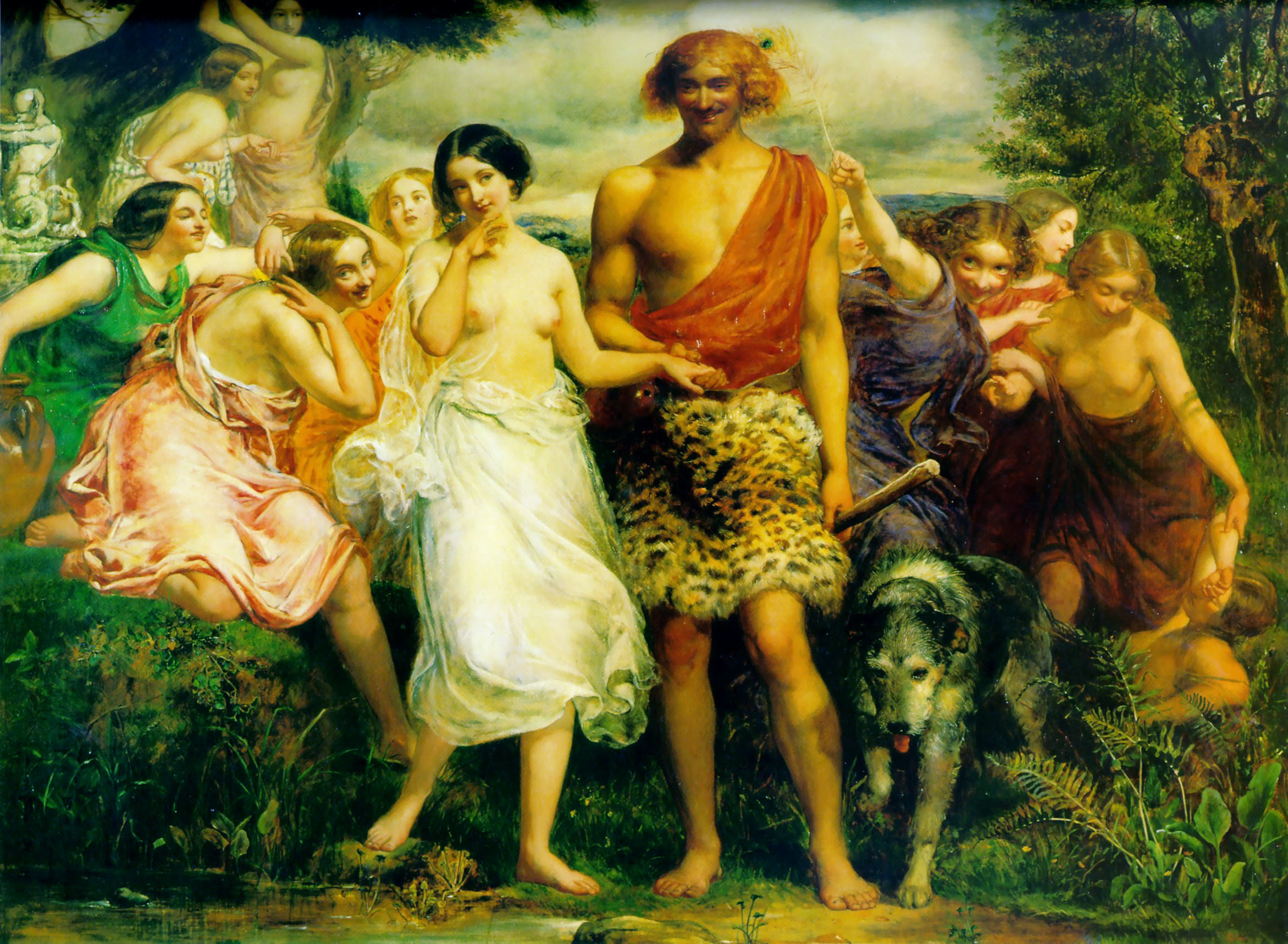
Millais's Cymon and Iphigenia is one of the few later works influenced by The Destroying Angel.

As Etty had rapidly fallen from fashion, his works had little influence on most subsequent painters. William Edward Frost was a great admirer of Etty, and Frost's Una Alarmed by Fauns (1843) and Una and the Wood Nymphs (1847) owe a conscious debt to The Destroying Angel in their depiction of a group of semi-clad daemonic and human figures, as does John Everett Millais's early work Cymon and Iphigenia (1848). As Etty's style became increasingly unpopular, those artists who had imitated him, other than Frost, soon abandoned the style. Etty's biographer Leonard Robinson contends that the later fairy paintings of Richard Dadd, which often show large crowds of mythical creatures mingling with humans, were influenced by Etty but concedes that Dadd was likely unconscious of Etty's influence on his style.
