= John Hamilton Reynolds =

English poet, satirist, critic and playwright

- Born: 9 September 1794; Shrewsbury, Great Britain
- Died: 15 November 1852 (aged 58); Newport, Isle of Wight, United Kingdom
- Education: Shrewsbury School, St Paul's School
- Occupations: Poet, journalist, lawyer
- Spouse: Eliza Drewe
- Writing career
- Language: English
- Literary movement: Romanticism

John Hamilton Reynolds (9 September 1794 – 15 November 1852) was an English poet, satirist, critic, and playwright. He was a close friend and correspondent of poet John Keats, whose letters to Reynolds constitute a significant body of Keats' poetic thought. Reynolds was also the brother-in-law of the writer and humorist Thomas Hood, who was married to his sister Jane.

== Early life ==
Reynolds was born in Shrewsbury to George Reynolds, teacher at Shrewsbury School and Charlotte Cox Reynolds. His mother was related to the Hamilton family, from which Reynolds received his middle name, which included the Gothic writer William Thomas Beckford. Reynolds attended Shrewsbury School, then enrolled at St Paul's School in London, when the family moved in 1806, completing formal education in 1810.

== Early career ==
He took a junior clerkship in an insurance office, the Amicable Society for Perpetual Assurance, working there at least until 1816; and from 1818 to 1820, he worked in Essex Street for Francis Fladgate, a solicitor. Meanwhile, he pursued his self-education by reading widely in classical and English literature and also began writing poetry. He was encouraged in his literary interests by his friend John F M Dovaston, a former student of Reynolds's father.

== Literary works ==
Reynolds's first published poem, "Ode to Friendship" appeared in the Gentleman's Magazine in 1812. He was a prolific journalist and reviewer, and published collections of poems and a diverse array of articles. He received favourable notice from a number of critics and poets, including Byron, whose work Reynolds had closely imitated. Later he published The Eden of Imagination, imitating Wordsworth, who had also encouraged him. Early in his poetic career, John Clare claimed to be a huge admirer of Reynolds's work, and the two met and socialised with other contributors to the London Magazine. In addition to the latter, Reynolds also contributed to the Edinburgh Review during the 1820s and in 1831 he became part-owner of The Athenaeum.

In 1819 he wrote a parody of Peter Bell by William Wordsworth entitled Peter Bell, A Lyrical Ballad. Percy Bysshe Shelley also wrote a parody of the Wordsworth work, Peter Bell the Third, referring to the Reynolds parody as Peter Bell the Second.

== John Keats ==
His friend Leigh Hunt supported his writing and introduced him to another young poet Hunt greatly admired, the then unknown John Keats. Together with Percy Bysshe Shelley, the two were featured by Hunt in his 1816 article on a “new school of poets”, called ‘’Young Poetry’’. Keats and Reynolds became friends, encouraging and challenging each other in their quest for literary recognition. Keats was in 1819 to praise Reynolds’ Wordsworth parody, ‘’Peter Bell: A Lyrical Ballad’’; and it is in witty parody that Reynolds is now considered to have been at his poetic best.

== Personal life ==
In 1822, he married Eliza Drewe. This led to a friendship and literary collaboration with her brother-in-law, Thomas Hood. Together the two wrote several comic and satirical pieces, the most popular being Odes and Addresses to Great People in 1825.

Tragedy struck in 1834 when his ten-year-old daughter Lucy died.

Described as 'John Hamilton Reynolds, Great Marlborough street, Oxford Street, money scrivener' he was declared bankrupt in May 1838.

One obituary asserts that unluckily for him, Reynolds became involved with Mr. Gully (John Gully?) which led to him betting on events which did not always turn out as he expected. The consequences being so disastrous (bankruptcy) that he gave up his practice of law and sought the ‘quietude’ of the Isle of Wight.

In 1847 he was appointed Clerk for the district of Newport, Isle of Wight in the County of Southampton.

John died at Node Hill [Upper St James Street], Newport on 15 November 1852, and was buried in the St Thomas’ Church Burial Ground on 19 November.

It was recorded in 1913 that visitors looking for his grave had difficulty finding it due to the illegibility of the inscription on the headstone and the neglected state of the grave. At that time the headstone was renovated, the inscription made readable and the further inscription “THE FRIEND OF KEATS” added to the headstone.

In the 1950s the Burial Ground was cleared of most memorials and was laid out as a public park known as Church Litten, the headstone for John H. Reynolds was retained and today (2025) although the headstone does not mark the position of John's grave, it is preserved and is positioned against the wall on the west side of the park, adjacent to the Mountbatten Library.

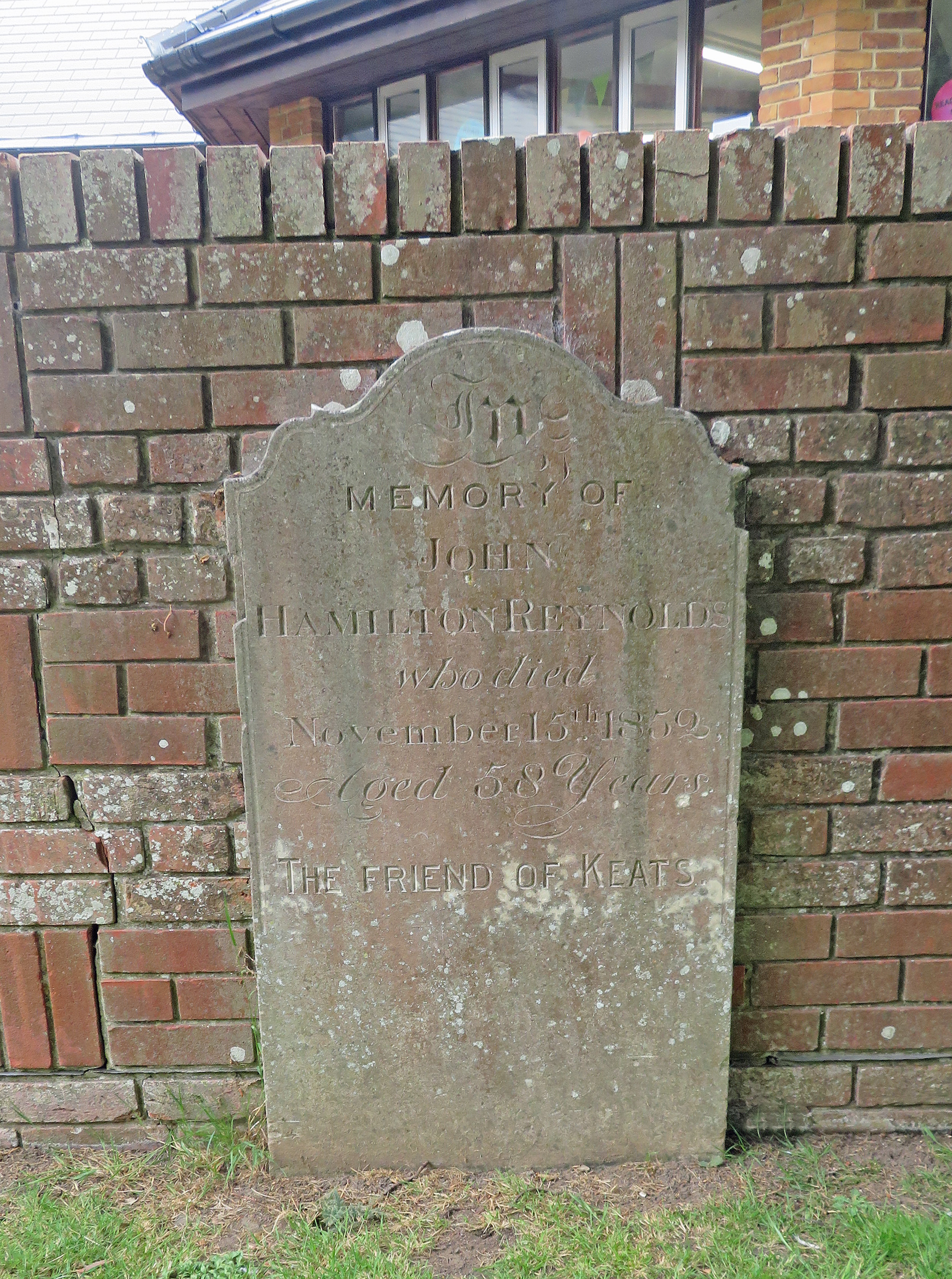
Headstone of John Hamilton Reynolds, Church Litten Park, Newport, Isle of Wight

== See also ==
- Zetosophian society

== Sources ==
- Barnard, John, Keats’s ‘Robin Hood’, John Hamilton Reynolds, and the ‘Old Poets’. Warton Lecture on English Poetry; published in Proceedings of the British Academy, Vol. 75.
- Gittings, Robert, The Poetry of John Hamilton Reynolds. In: Ariel, Vol. I, No. 4. October 1970.
- Hudnall, Clayton E., John Hamilton Reynolds, James Rice, and Benjamin Bailey in the Leigh Browne-Lockyer Collection. In: Keats-Shelley Journal, Vol. XIX, 1970, pp. 11–39.
- Jones, Leonidas M., The Life of John Hamilton Reynolds. Hanover, University Press of New England. 1984.
- Jones, Leonidas M., New Letters, Articles, and Poems by John Hamilton Reynolds. In: Keats-Shelley Journal, Vol. VI, 1957, pp. 97–108.
- Jones, Leonidas M., Reynolds and Keats. In: Keats-Shelley Journal, Vol. VII, 1958, pp. 47–59.
- Jones, Leonidas M., Reynolds and Rice in Defence of Patmore. In: The Keats-Shelley Memorial Bulletin, No. XXI, 1970, pp. 12–20.
- Kaier, Anne, John Hamilton Reynolds: Four New Letters. In: Keats-Shelley Journal, Vol. XXX, 1981.
- Kovesi, Simon, John Hamilton Reynolds, John Clare and The London Magazine, The Wordsworth Circle, 42.3 (Summer 2011), 226–235.
- Kaufman, Paul, The Reynolds-Hood Commonplace Book: A Fresh Appraisal. In: Keats-Shelley Journal, Vol. X, Winter 1961.
- McMullin, B.J., John Hamilton Reynolds and Archibald Constable & Co., 1819-1821. In: Keats-Shelley Journal, 1994, pp. 19–24.
- Mann, Phyllis G., The Reynolds Family. In: Keats-Shelley Journal, Vol. V, Winter 1956.
- Marsh, George L., New Data on Keats's Friend Reynolds. In: Modern Philology, Vol. XXV, No. 3. February 1928.
- Morgan, Peter F., John Hamilton Reynolds and Thomas Hood. In: Keats-Shelly Journal, Vol. XI, 1962.
- Pope, Willard B., John Hamilton Reynolds, the Friend of Keats. Reprint from Wessex, 1935.
- Reynolds, John Hamilton (Ed. Leonidas M. Jones), Selected Prose of John Hamilton Reynolds. Cambridge, Harvard University Press. 1966.
- Reynolds, John Hamilton (Ed. Leonidas M. Jones), The Letters of John Hamilton Reynolds. Lincoln, University of Nebraska. 1973.
- Richardson, Joanna, Letters from Lambeth. The correspondence of the Reynolds family with John Freeman Milward Dovaston 1808-1815. Woodbridge, Boydell. 1981.
