= King Candaules =

Painting by Jules Joseph Lefebvre

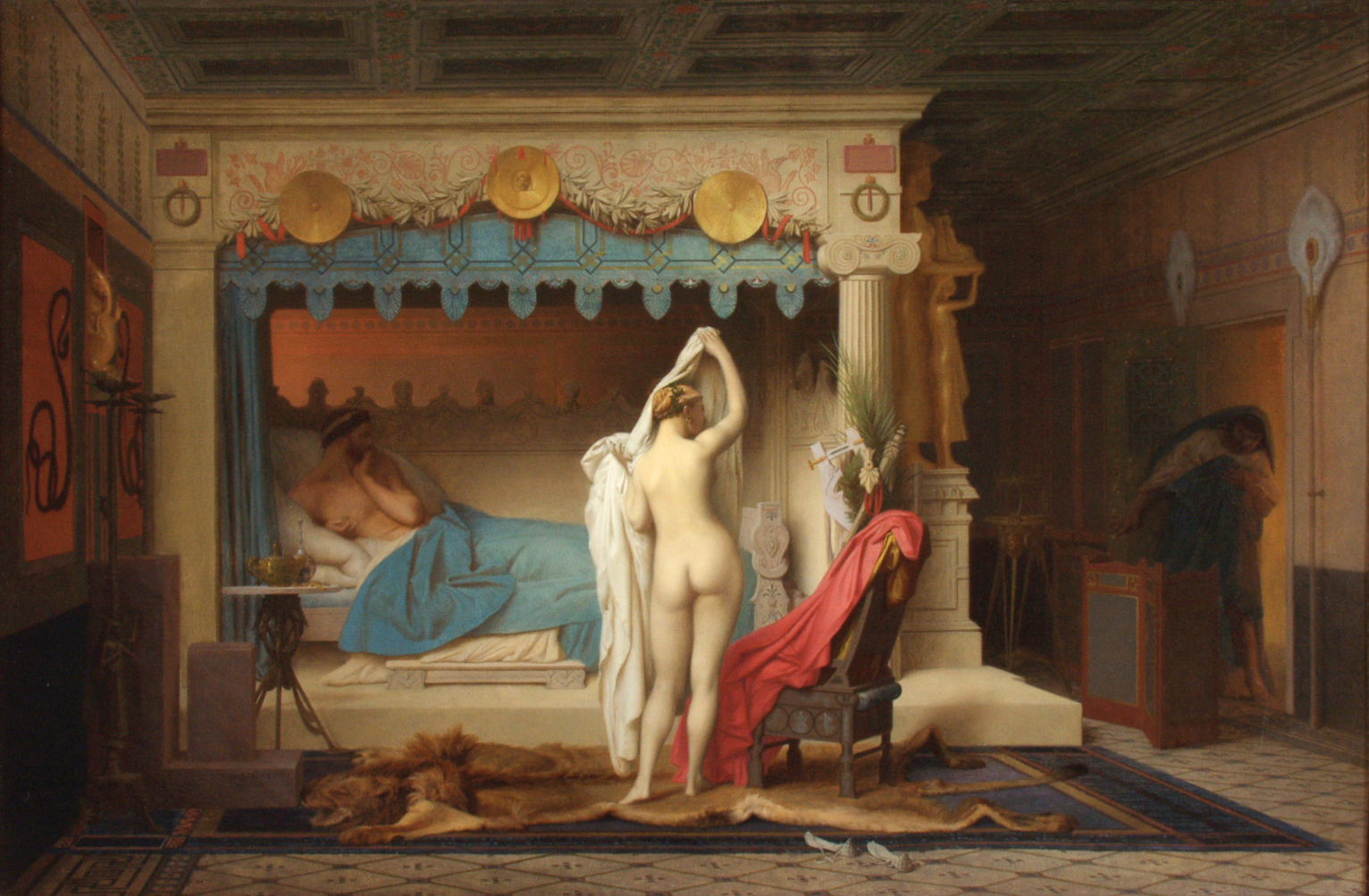
- Artist: Jean-Léon Gérôme
- Year: 1859
- Type: Oil on canvas, history painting
- Dimensions: 67 cm × 100.1 cm (26 in × 39.4 in)
- Location: Museo de Arte de Ponce, Puerto Rico

King Candaules (French: Le Roi Candaules) is an 1859 history painting by the French artist Jean-Léon Gérôme. It depicts a legendary scene from the Kingdom of Lydia in Anatolia during classical period. King Candaules had an excessive pride in his wife's Nyssia's beauty. To prove this and show her off he secretly invited his bodyguard Gyges of Lydia to watch her while she was undressing. When she discovered what had happened she conspired with Gyges to assassinate her husband and take his place.

The painting was based on a story in the Histories by the Ancient Greek writer Herodotus, which had recently been translated into French by Théophile Gautier. The painting was displayed at the Salon of 1859 in Paris. It is now in the collection of the Museo de Arte de Ponce in Puerto Rico.

== See also ==
- Candaules, King of Lydia, Shews his Wife by Stealth to Gyges, One of his Ministers, as She Goes to Bed, an 1830 painting by William Etty.

== Bibliography ==
- Lafont-Couturier, Hélène. Gérôme and Goupil. Réunion des musées nationaux, 2000.
- Moser, Stephanie. Painting Antiquity: Ancient Egypt in the Art of Lawrence Alma-Tadema, Edward Poynter and Edwin Long. Oxford University Press, 2020.
- Weinberg, Helene Barbara. The American Pupils of Jean-Léon Gérôme. Amon Carter Museum, 1984.
