= Proclamation For the Encouragement of Piety and Virtue =

King George III's Royal Proclamation For the Encouragement of Piety and Virtue, and for the Preventing and Punishing of Vice, Profaneness and Immorality exhorted the British public against sexually explicit material. It called for the suppression of all "loose and licentious Prints, Books, and Publications, dispersing Poison to the minds of the Young and Unwary and to Punish the Publishers and Vendors thereof". Groups which promoted it included the Proclamation Society, which later became the Society for the Suppression of Vice which was instituted in 1802 to "check the spread of open vice and immorality, and more especially to preserve the minds of the young from contamination by exposure to the corrupting influence of impure and licentious books, prints, and other publications". This had little effect, because they had no power to destroy the material.

It was issued on 1 June 1787 – after William Wilberforce and Bishop Porteous agreed to solicit (in the words of one source) "a Royal Proclamation such as earlier sovereigns had used in times of moral crisis".

However, according to one source, it was first "made a legal document" during the reign of Queen Anne; it was "Given at our court at St. James" on 25 February 1702 (N.S. 1703) by Queen Anne in the first year of her reign – and secretary Lord Bolingbroke was "the instrument of introducing it into the House of Commons". This version issued by King George III was to be read four times a year in churches, and was still being published by the Society for Promoting Christian Knowledge in c. 1818.

An editorialist writing in 1820 commented that:

This proclamation is now considered, both by its deliverer and receiver, as a mere usual and commonplace document. Those who have been present at the opening of an assize, must have perceived that the clerk of the court yawns over it two or three times whilst reading it; and it ever puts the priests to the blush, when they find it necessary to read it.

== Overruled ==
The next law on sexually explicit material, the Obscene Publications Act (introduced in September 1857 by Lord Campbell, the Lord Chief Justice) replaced this proclamation.

== See also ==
- Society for the Suppression of Vice
- Royal Proclamation
