= Zetosophian society =

British literary group

The Zetosophian Society was a literary group which operated in London in the second decade of the 19th century. The Zetosophian (meaning 'I seek wisdom') society was composed of 14 men and included among its membership John Hamilton Reynolds, Benjamin Bailey, and James Rice, all of whom went on to be friends of John Keats, though Keats himself was not a member.

The society worked at providing feedback on each members literary works. Each member was expected to read and write one essay each month. The society disbanded in 1815 after disputes between the members.
