= Peter Bell (Wordsworth) =

Poem by William Wordsworth

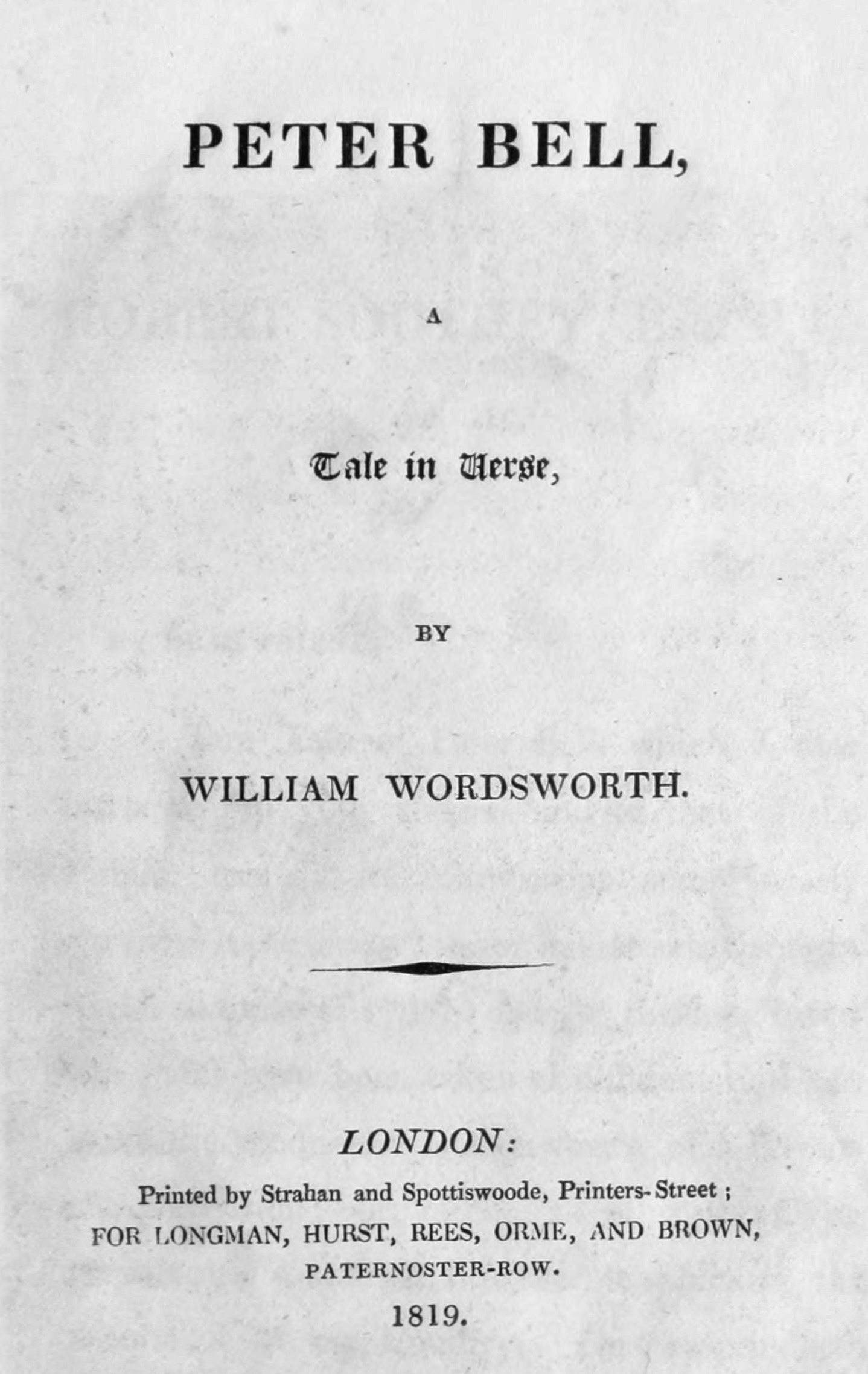
First edition title page

Peter Bell: A Tale in Verse is a long narrative poem by William Wordsworth, written in 1798, but not published until 1819.

== Synopsis ==
In a tone of straight-faced humour the prologue tells of the poet's travels over the face of the earth and through the heavens in a boat of the imagination, which urges him to choose some exotic or otherworldly theme. The poet rejects the suggestion and opts for the more homely subject of Peter Bell. The poem proper begins with a description of him as a hard-hearted sinner, impervious to the softening influence of nature, who makes his living as an itinerant hawker (or potter, in Wordsworth's northern expression) of earthenware. One night, while walking through Swaledale by night, he loses his way. He comes across an ass standing untended, gazing into the river Swale, and he tries to ride away on it, but the ass does not respond to his furious beating of it. Peter sees the face of a corpse in the river, and faints from shock. On recovering consciousness, he drags the dead man, once the owner of the ass, onto dry land. The ass now consents to start for home, taking Peter with him. A loud cry is heard in the distance, which, though Peter does not know it, comes from the dead man's young son, who is searching for his father. Unnerved by this, and by the sight of the bloody wounds he has inflicted on the ass, Peter begins to feel unaccustomed pangs of conscience. His mind turns to his many past sins, and as he passes an outdoor Methodist meeting his heart responds to the preacher's calls for repentance. The ass reaches the home of the dead man, whose wife is waiting for him. She learns that she is a widow, and her children orphans:

And now is Peter taught to feel
That man's heart is a holy thing;
And Nature, through a world of death,
Breathes into him a second breath,
More searching than the breath of spring.

The poem closes with Peter downcast by his experiences, but eventually emerging as a better man.

== Composition and publication ==
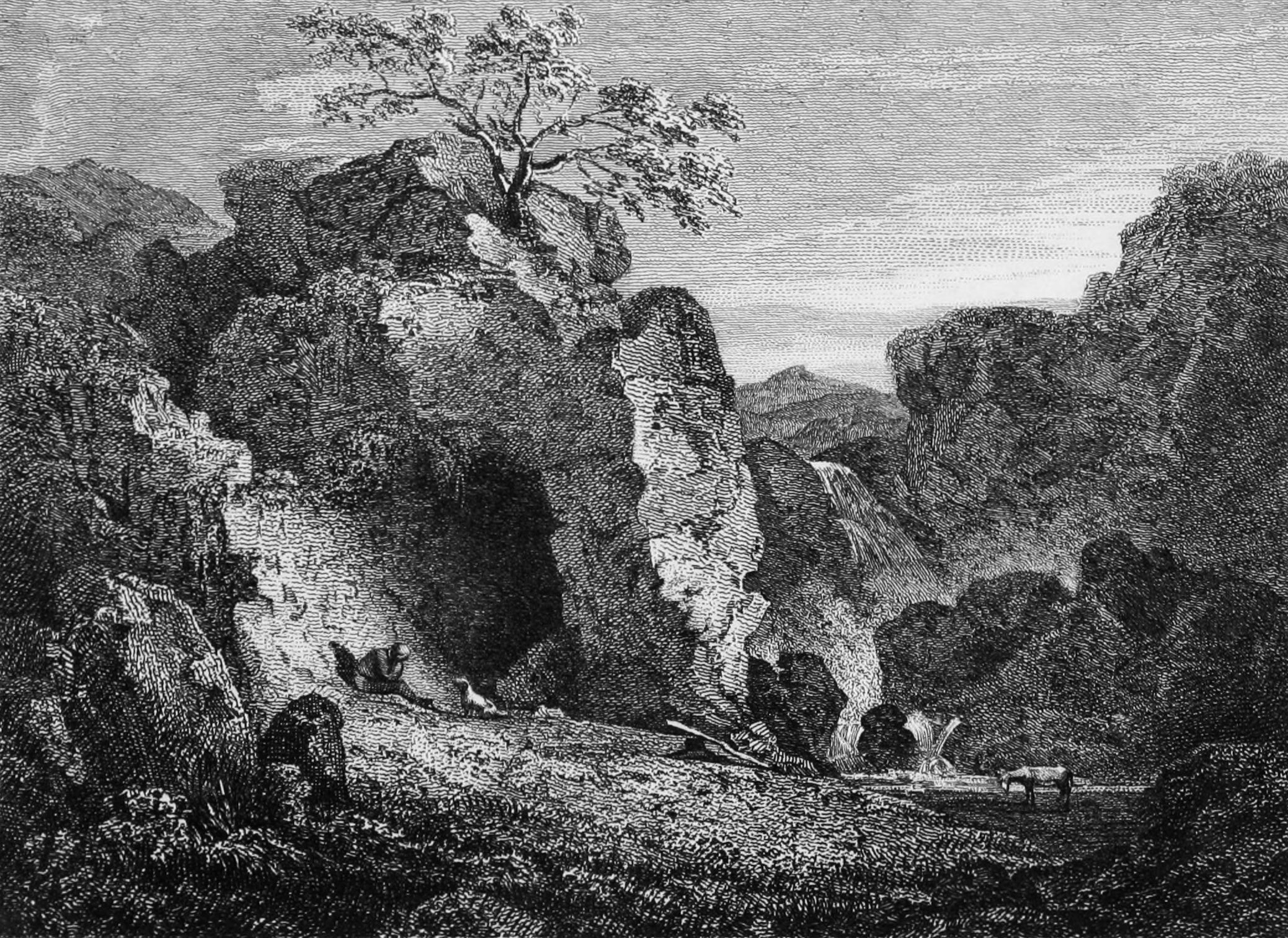
Frontispiece illustration to the first edition. The Swaledale night-scene.

In 1793, while walking in the Wye Valley, Wordsworth fell in with a "wild rover" who, as he later recalled, "told me strange stories" as they wandered together. Five years later he drew on his memories of this vagrant for a new poem. Wordsworth began writing Peter Bell on 20 April 1798, and by late May of that year was able to read it aloud at Alfoxden to William Hazlitt. Though the poem was first written during the final preparations for his and Coleridge's Lyrical Ballads Wordsworth did not choose to include it in that collection. In February 1799 he reported that he had been performing some cuts on Peter Bell. In February 1802 he revised it again, and the following month talked of publishing it, perhaps with "The Ruined Cottage" or "Adventures on Salisbury Plain", but for the moment nothing came of this. One more revision in 1812 was followed by plans for publication in 1815, again abandoned. Peter Bell was finally published in April 1819, with four sonnets to accompany it, and with a dedication to his friend Robert Southey.

== Reception ==
John Hamilton Reynolds, reading about the impending publication, wrote a Wordsworth parody called Peter Bell: a Lyrical Ballad, which appeared a week before the genuine Peter Bell and stirred up enough public interest to ensure that Wordsworth's poem went into a second edition within a fortnight. In contemporary journals the poem was, like his previous publications, generally greeted with derision and contempt, critics being especially provoked by the deliberately flat diction and by the mundanity of its subject, as exemplified in Peter Bell's own prosaic name. Leigh Hunt, writing in The Examiner, condemned Peter Bell as "a didactic little horror…founded on the bewitching principles of fear, bigotry, and diseased impulse". Other reviewers spoke of its "gross perversion of intellect" and "tincture of imbecility", and pronounced it "superlatively silly", "daudling, impotent drivel" and "of all Mr. Wordsworth's poems…decidedly the worst". Byron, in his Don Juan, sneered that Wordsworth "makes / Another outcry for 'a little boat', / And drivels seas to set it well afloat".

Even close friends could offer little comfort. Charles Lamb wrote to Wordsworth that though he liked the poem's subject "I cannot say that the style of it quite satisfies me. It is too lyrical," and he privately said that he thought it one of the worst of Wordsworth's works. Henry Crabb Robinson feared Wordsworth had "set himself back ten years by the publication of this unfortunate work". In the months after the publication of Wordsworth's poem and Reynolds' skit a whole rash of Wordsworth parodies broke out, by Keats and Shelley among others. Shelley's Peter Bell the Third was not published until 1839. Wordsworth responded to this general damnation of Peter Bell by revising it when he included it in his 1820 collected edition, Miscellaneous Poems, though he also wrote a sonnet "On the Detraction which followed the Publication of a certain Poem" in which he told Peter "Heed not such onset!". Opinion was slow to change in Peter Bell's favour. In 1879 Matthew Arnold counted it among the poems which only a true Wordsworthian such as himself could read with pleasure, and in 1891 Oscar Wilde cited it as an example of the deleterious influence of Nature on Wordsworth's poetry. Modern Wordsworth critics generally rank Peter Bell high among its author's works, full credit being given to its daring as a "radical experiment". Duncan Wu numbered it among Wordsworth's greatest poems, while Mary Moorman called it "his most brilliant narrative poem".
