= Oedipus Tyrannus; or, Swellfoot the Tyrant =

Verse drama by Percy Bysshe Shelley

- The 1820 first edition title page of Oedipus Tyrannus; or, Swellfoot the Tyrant London. J. Johnston.
- Author: Percy Bysshe Shelley
- Language: English
- Published: 1820
- Publisher: J. Johnston
- Publication place: London, Great Britain
- Pages: 50

Oedipus Tyrannus; or, Swellfoot the Tyrant, is a satirical play by English Romantic poet Percy Bysshe Shelley in two acts published anonymously for the author in 1820 in London by J. Johnston.

It was a satirical drama and grotesquerie focusing on the divorce proceedings between King George IV and Queen Caroline, known as the Trial of Queen Caroline. In it, Shelley castigates the British monarchy, the corruption of Parliament, and the inequality in British society. He urges resistance to and repudiation of the monarchy.

George IV is satirized as King Swellfoot, a corrupt, megalomaniac, who regards the people of Britain as a "swinish multitude". Queen Caroline is depicted as Iona Taurina.

He exposed the hypocrisy of government ministers and shows the ineffectiveness of parliamentary procedures.

Like in his other political works, he is opposed to monarchy as corrupt and unrepresentative of the people.

The work was withdrawn because the Society for the Suppression of Vice threatened to prosecute the publisher. It was accused of being seditious and obscene.

This was the epigraph of the drama:

"Choose Reform or Civil War,
When through thy streets,
instead of hare with dogs,
A Consort-Queen shall hunt a King with hogs,
Riding on the IONIAN MINOTAUR."

== Background ==
The play was begun at the Baths of San Giuliano, near Pisa, Italy on August 24, 1819, and published anonymously by J. Johnston, Cheapside with the imprint C. F. Seyfang in 1820 in London.

On a threat of prosecution the publisher surrendered the whole impression after only seven copies were sold. The work subsequently disappeared.

The play was not included in the first edition of The Poetical Works published in 1839 by Edward Moxon. It was, however, included in the second edition of that year.

Shelley satirized Sophocles' Oedipus Rex and his trilogy and Aristophanes' The Frogs.

== Characters ==
- King Swellfoot: Represents George IV, the corrupt, tyrannical monarch who regards his subjects as "swinish" or the "swinish multitude".
- Iona Taurina: Represents Queen Caroline, the exiled Queen who returns to fight the charges.
- The Swine: Represent the People or the British public or the working class, who also act as a chorus.
- The Minotaur: Represents John Bull, the symbol or embodiment of the English working class or workers who support Iona Taurina.
- Purganax: Represents Lord Castlereagh, the leading minister or courtier to the King.
- Dakry: Represents Lord Eldon, a minister in the court.
- Mammon: Represents Lord Liverpool, a minister representing greed.
- Lactones: Represents Wellington, a government official.
- Gadfly: Represents Lt. Col. Browne, the official spying on Iona Taurina.
- Leech: Represents Vice Chancellor Sir John Leach, who was a member of the 1818 Milan Commission which investigated Queen Caroline of Brunswick to obtain the divorce from the King.
- Rat: Represents William Cooke.

== Summary ==
Act I.

In the opening scene of Act I, Swellfoot meets supplicants at his Temple in Thebes, Greece in Boeotia, in central part of the country. He does not take notice of the pigs which surround him. He is callous towards them. It is a parody of Sophocles' opening scene in Oedipus Rex where there is a similar scene.

The splendor of the Temple is shown. Death's heads, thigh bones, and scalps decorate it. Swellfoot compares his stomach to an Egyptian pyramid. Thistle, shamrock, and oak represent the people of Scotland, Ireland, and England. Boars, sows, and sucking pigs are symbolically the people of Scotland, Ireland, and England.

"Royal robes" of "gold and purple" like Jupiter wore in Prometheus Unbound are the symbols of power, excess, and oppression. He is a decadent dictator or tyrant. The pigs ask for food. He answers: "Kill them out of the way". His obesity and arrogance are highlighted. King George IV was also obese and had gout, a swollen foot.

He shows disdain for the people and his supporters. Shelley invokes Edmund Burke's term "the Swinish Multitude" which Mammon uses to describe his subjects: "But 'tis the swinish multitude I fear." Swellfoot's hypocrisy is shown. Sows are required to be spayed because they have no "moral restraint". The parallel is to his "own example", his adultery, although he accuses Queen Caroline of adultery. His complaint against her shows his hypocrisy.

The frogs song from Sophocles is parodied: "Brekakek Koax Koax": frogs, croaking; pigs, squealing, grunting: "Aigh! Aigh! Eigh!, Eigh!, Ugh!, Ugh!". The dialogue with the pigs is without words; body language and sounds are only employed.

Comedy and pathos are depicted when Moses tries to spay the sows. Then chaos erupts: "The pigs run about in consternation". Swellfoot seeks to demonstrate that, unlike the pigs, he possesses "moral restraint". Moses warns: "Keep the Boars quiet, else". This is a satire of Malthusianism and population control. Swellfoot orders that the pigs be driven to slaughter.

Mammom and Purganax enter and have a dialogue which reveals the plot against Iona Taurina, the Queen. It shows their lies, duplicity, schemes, spying, and their fear of the people. Purganax is uncertain and desperate: "The future looks as black as death". He worries about the Oracle and the Swine. Purganax eventually becomes confident after his talks with his spies while Mammon panics. They switch places or roles. Shelley used this approach or device in The Cenci. The Oracle alluded to or is a metaphor for Britain's precarious economic plight at that time.

Mammon discusses his financial dealings and his fear of "the Swinish multitude". Mammon asks: "My dear friends, where are your wits?"

The Leech, Rat, and Gadfly appear. The Leech is a parody of John Leach, who was part of the Milan Commission, which was spying on the proceedings. The Gadfly enters. Mammon and Purganax interrupt each other, displaying fear and secrecy. The Gadfly was "fed on dung" and was "trailing a blistering slime". The Gadfly also has "convex eyes", can see "fair things in many hideous shapes." The Leech and Rat are disgusting and sinister.

There is wordplay like in Zastrozzi, neologisms, coining of new words, such as "deader", "uglification", "dumbed her". "Off with her head!" declares Swellfoot. Shelley coined the word "uglification" according to the Oxford English Dictionary (OED), which Shelley used before Lewis Carroll in Alice in Wonderland (1865) and C.S. Lewis in The Voyage of the Dawn Treader.

Mammon has a Green Bag which he claims can be used to determine guilt or innocence. The Rat emphasizes Mammon's fear of the pigs, who may turn out to be John Bull. When a jury is called to maintain the appearance of legality, Swellfoot responds: "Pack them then", implying corruption. They are also assured that the soldiers, ape-guards, can also easily be bribed.

Laoctonos and Dakry enter with their news from the battlefront. The "royal apes" cannot defeat the Swine. The pigs are able to hang on at the end of the Act and avoid defeat.

Act II, scene 1.

The setting of Act II, scene 1 is "The Public Stye", a parody of the British House of Commons where the Boars "in full Assembly", follow mock Parliamentary procedure. Iona's trial is beginning.

Purganax's speech, which opens the act, parodies Lord Castlereagh’s speech. The pigs have impugned Swellfoot's system and now mock the "genuflexions Inculcated by the arch-priest, have been whipped Into a loyal and an orthodox whine." Shelley satirizes the hypocrisy of Castlereagh's morality and patriotic virtue by declaring him to be that true source of "Piggishness".

Shelley mocks the MPs' conservatism and conformity and fast surrender to peer pressure. He noted how easy it is for an orator to convince his opponents as Purganax can easily win over those like the First Boar. The First Boer starts by supporting Iona but ends up praising Purganax as "excellent". Shelley combines elements of both a pigsty and the House of Commons.

Shelley points out the unequal class structure of society in Britain. The Boars are better off than "the Swinish multitude". He shows that the interests of the Boars and the pigs are opposed on class grounds:

"the Lean-pig faction
Seeks to obtain that hog-wash, which has been
Your immemorial right, and which I will
Maintain you in to the last drop of –"

The Chorus then enters the Stye as the Speaker, the First Boar, seeks to quell the rebellion of the pigs, who support Iona. Iona enters and delivers a speech proclaiming her innocence and thanks the pigs for their support. Iona and the pigs are victorious.

Scene 2.

The Scene II set consists of a statue of a skeleton "clothed in parti-coloured rags, seated upon a heap of skulls and loaves intermingled", which is the statue of Famine. It presents a picture of "exceedingly fat Priests in black garments", "arrayed" on either side of a skeleton, skulls and loaves, placing in their hands the marrow bones and cleavers on which they are to perform.

Mammon, Swellfoot and the ministers enter from one side while the swine enter from another. The Chorus of priests supports the status quo and conservatism, and opposes reform:

"The earth pours forth its plenteous fruits,
Corn, wool, linen, flesh, and roots –
Those who consume these fruits through thee grow fat,
Those who produce these fruits through thee grow lean,
Whatever change takes place, oh, stick to that!
And let things be as they have ever been;
At least while we remain thy priests".

The table in the scene shows the opulence and plenty of the rich and powerful and the scarcity and want of the poor, the Lean-pigs. Swellfoot seeks to silence the pigs but is refused because the grunting of the pigs is a tribute to Famine.

The pigs make a call for rebellion. They call for "dividing possessions," "uprooting oppressions" and making all "level" instead of "new churches, and cant", exposing the government's hypocritical program of church building.

Iona's trial begins. Liberty, "a graceful figure in a semitransparent veil", passes through the Temple and delivers the parabasis, an aside to the audience, a feature of Greek Old Comedy, kneeling in genuine prayer. While Liberty, "the Veiled Figure has been chanting this strophe", the government ministers have surrounded Iona. This is contrasted with Iona, who displays a fake image of piety and virtue.

Freedom is Famine's "eternal foe". Liberty asks Famine to "wake the multitude" but to "lead them not upon the paths of blood", emphasizing Shelley's nonviolent and peaceful civil disobedience. He disclaims all force and violence. He argues that it is want alone which drives people to "fanatic rage and meaningless revenge". Eliminate want and you will eliminate violence and bloodshed.

In a climactic moment, Iona snatches the green bag and pours the contents on "Swellfoot and the whole Court". They are all "instantly" changed into "ugly badgers ... stinking foxes … devouring otters … hares" and "wolves". The pigs who eat the loaves are transformed into bulls.

The "filthy and ugly animals" representing the King and his Court, rush out. The pigs run for the loaves which are accessible now because Famine is not seated on them any more.

Famine descends through the trapdoor as the Minotaur rises. The Minotaur, "in plain Theban, that is to say, John Bull", is the symbol or embodiment of the revolutionary or reformist spirit in the country. He has power and motivation which enables him to "leap any gate".

He offers aid to Iona who "leaps nimbly on to his back". He has an ulterior motive. She has to pursue "the filthy and ugly animals". He makes clear that the alliance with the Queen is only temporary. He can throw her off his back whenever he wishes but does not do so until she has accomplished her task. The alliance is only in force "till you have hunted down your game".

The alliance between Iona and Minotaur is, thus, only temporary and one of convenience to achieve a larger purpose. It is similar to the marriage of convenience between Liberty and Famine. Shelley similarly perceived the alliance between the people and Queen Caroline as temporary to achieve a set goal or purpose. Ultimately, however, the people will reject the Queen and the monarchy.

The Queen and the Minotaur exit or depart the stage for the hunt with hounds baying, bells ringing and cries of "Tallyho!".

The pigs who metamorphose into bulls, by contrast, "arrange themselves quietly behind the altar", not participating in the violent and vengeful hunt. The transformed bulls represent the "radiant spirits" described by Liberty. The play ends with the defeat and downfall of the corrupt and oppressive monarchs and the victory of the people, who obtain freedom and liberty.

== Publication history ==
Written in August, 1820, the play was published that same year anonymously in London by J. Johnston. Fearing prosecution, the work was immediately withdrawn and copies destroyed.

It was first collected in 1839 in the second edition of The Works of Percy Bysshe Shelley, edited by Mary Shelley, published in London by Edward Moxon. It was republished by Moxon in 1853.

Harry Buxton Forman republished the play in a standalone version in 1884 in London with a brief introductory note.

In 1907, a Polish translation of the play by Jan Kasprowicz was published in Lwow, Poland.

In 1914, the play was included in The Complete Poetical Works of Percy Bysshe Shelley, published by the Oxford University Press edited by Thomas Hutchinson.

In 1932, it was included in the John Keats and Percy Bysshe Shelley: Complete Poetical Works collection published in New York by The Modern Library.

== Influence ==
Oedipus Tyrannus is significant as a further elaboration and exposition of Shelley's opposition to monarchy and arbitrary, authoritarian rule. Percy Bysshe Shelley's anti-monarchical and anti-tyrannical views were a constant throughout his life and career. These views are prominently expressed in Queen Mab (1813), The Masque of Anarchy (1819), "England in 1819" (1819), the Poetical Essay on the Existing State of Things (1811), "Ozymandias" (1818), a sonnet exploring the inevitable decline of tyrants and empires, and A Philosophical View of Reform (1819–20), a prose work where he critiques the aristocracy and government, calling them a "prodigious anomaly". He consistently attacked the British monarchy, aristocracy, and corrupt government institutions as oppressive, unjust, and "leech-like".

In Oedipus Tyrannus; or, Swellfoot the Tyrant, Shelley exhibited theatrical and dramatical techniques drawn from the comic traditions of Aristophanes, Sophocles, commedia, burlesque, pantomime and Punch. Shelley combines classical forms and contemporary political and social commentary in a unique way.

Elisabetta Marino argued that the play is "not just 'a plaything of the imagination'", but a major work with complexity and creativity.

Dana Van Kooy noted that the Queen Caroline controversy caused a crisis in Britain that attracted the interest of the public as well as writers: "Lord Byron and Percy Bysshe Shelley wrote dramas that specifically staged the fears of civil war that accompanied the Queen Caroline affair."

Michael J. Neth noted that critics have recognized the "play’s signature blend of low and high, of ephemeral, late Regency politics with the classic genres of Sophoclean tragedy, Aristophanic comedy, and mock epic." The work is a synthesis that "evinces Shelley’s unique, conscious reconfiguration of four conventions characteristic of the high, classical epic: the 'prosperous breeze'; the epic simile; katabasis or descent into the underworld; and divine intervention." He concluded that "Shelley’s comic adaptation of these epic conventions reflects his serious aim of helping effect reform through Swellfoot and embodies his absorption of the concept of Shakespeare’s history plays as an experimental hybrid of dramatic forms with epic subjects." The play was a creative and complex combination of forms: "Though the immediate suppression of Swellfoot prevented its relevance in its own historical moment, it comprises a singular hybrid of Aristophanic satire and Sophoclean tragedy with high epic conventions."

Seymour Reiter characterized the play as the "only great lashing Aristophanic comedy, fantastic and grotesque, in our language".

Samuel Lyndon Gladden wrote that it was a neglected work: "One of the most overlooked texts in Shelley scholarship". Gladden saw it as a central work in the Shelley canon, "its intra- and extra-textual engagements situate the play as a document pivotal to Shelley's articulation of the agenda of liberty-through-love."

== Sources ==
- Campbell, Gertrude H. "The Swinish Multitude." Modern Language Notes 30.6 (1915): 161–164.
- Erkelenz, Michael. "The Genre and Politics of Shelley’s 'Swellfoot the Tyrant'." The Review of English Studies, vol. 47, no. 188, 1996, pp. 500–20. JSTOR, http://www.jstor.org/stable/517927. Accessed 13 April 2026.
- Gardner, John. "Caroline, Lamb, and Swellfoot." Charles Lamb Bulletin (2001): 2-22.
- Gladden, Samuel. "Shelley's Agenda Writ Large: Reconsidering Oedipus Tyrannus; or, Swellfoot the Giant." (2001).
- Gladden, Samuel Lyndon. Shelley's Textual Seductions: Plotting Utopia in the Erotic and Political Works. London: Routledge, 2002.
- Gold, Elise M. "King Lear and Aesthetic Tyranny in Shelley's 'The Cenci', 'Swellfoot the Tyrant', and 'The Witch of Atlas'." English Language Notes 24.1 (1986): 58–70.
- Jacobs-Beck, Kimberly. "Pageant and Parade: Imperial and Populist Performance in Percy Shelley's Mask of Anarchy and Swellfoot the Tyrant." Interdisciplinary Humanities, 2014.
- Jones, Steven. "'Choose Reform or Civil War': Shelley, the English Revolution, and the Problem of Succession." The Wordsworth Circle 25.3 (1994): 145–149.
- Kooy, Dana Van. "The Queen Caroline Affair as a Theatrical and Dramatic Spectacle". In Trial by Media: The Queen Caroline Affair. Yale Law School and The Lewis Walpole Library, 2019, p. 2.
- Lee, Su-Yong. "Shelley’s Swellfoot the Tyrant: Poetic Satire on Politics." KCI, 2005, vol, no.74, pp. 41-57.
- Legato, Giulia. "Swellfoot the Tyrant by Percy Bysshe Shelley: Satire, Politics and Censorship in Georgian Drama." Università degli Studi di Bologna. Tesionline. 2009.
- Marino, Elisabetta. "Not just 'a plaything of the imagination': Complexity and Creativity in 'Oedipus Tyrannus, or Swellfoot the Tyrant', by PB Shelley." Worlds of Words: Complexity, Creativity, and Conventionality in English Language, Literature and Culture, Vol. II (Literature and Culture). Pisa University Press, 2019, pp. 111–119.
- Morton, Timothy. "Porcine Poetics: Shelley’s 'Swellfoot the Tyrant'." In The Unfamiliar Shelley by Timothy Webb, edited by Alan M. Weinberg. London: Routledge, 2009.
- Mulhallen, Jacqueline. The Theatre of Shelley. 1st ed., Open Book Publishers, 2010. JSTOR, https://doi.org/10.2307/j.ctt5vjtct. Accessed 13 April 2026.
- Mulhallen Jacqueline. "Queen Caroline and Swellfoot the Tyrant". Counterfire. 12 July 2020.
- Neth, Michael J. (2019). "'This Remarkable Piece of Antiquity': Epic Conventions in Shelley’s 'Oedipus Tyrannus; or, Swellfoot the Tyrant'." The European Legacy, 24(3–4), 396–422. https://doi.org/10.1080/10848770.2019.1571315
- Rossington, Michael. "19 Tragedy: The Cenci and Swellfoot the Tyrant." academic.oup.com. 28 January 2013, pp. 299–308. https://doi.org/10.1093/oxfordhb/9780199558360.013.0020
- Schmid, Thomas H. "'England Yet Sleeps': Intertextuality, Nationalism, and Risorgimento in P. B. Shelley’s 'Swellfoot the Tyrant.'" Keats-Shelley Journal, vol. 53, 2004, pp. 61–85. JSTOR, http://www.jstor.org/stable/30210529. Accessed 14 April 2026.
- Swallow, Peter. "Swine before Pearls: Aristophanes at Play in Percy Shelley’s 'Swellfoot the Tyrant'." Aristophanes in Britain: Old Comedy in the Nineteenth Century, Classical Presences (Oxford, 2023; online edn, Oxford Academic, 28 September 2023), https://doi.org/10.1093/oso/9780192868565.003.0003, accessed 13 Apr. 2026.
- Walker. David. British Satire, 1785-1840, Volume 2. 1st Edition. London: Routledge, 2004.
- White, Newman Ivey. "XV.—Shelley's 'Swell-Foot the Tyrant' in Relation to Contemporary Political Satires." PMLA , Volume 36, Issue 3, September 1921, pp. 332–346. DOI: https://doi.org/10.2307/457196
