= Society for the Suppression of Vice =

19th-century English society to promote public morality

The Society for the Suppression of Vice, formerly the Proclamation Society Against Vice and Immorality, or simply Proclamation Society, was a 19th-century English society dedicated to promoting public morality. It was established in 1802, based on a proclamation by George III in 1787, and as a successor to the 18th-century Society for the Reformation of Manners, and continued to function until 1885.

== History ==
The Society was founded by William Wilberforce following a Royal Proclamation by George III in 1787, the Proclamation for the Discouragement of Vice, on the urging of Wilberforce, as a remedy for the rising tide of immorality. The proclamation commanded the prosecution of those guilty of "excessive drinking, blasphemy, profane swearing and cursing, lewdness, profanation of the Lord's Day, and other dissolute, immoral, or disorderly practices". Greeted largely with public indifference, Wilberforce sought to increase its impact by mobilising public figures to the cause, and by founding the Society for the Suppression of Vice. It was also known as the Proclamation Society Against Vice and Immorality.

Other members of the Clapham Sect, of which Wilberforce was one, were also involved in the society.

As listed in an address published in 1803, the Society's particular concerns were: "profanation of the Lord's Day and profane swearing; publication of blasphemous, licentious and obscene books and prints; selling by false weights and measures; keeping of disorderly public houses, brothels and gaming houses; procuring; illegal lotteries; cruelty to animals".

M.J.D. Roberts writes that the Jacobin ideas, from the French Revolution, raised fears of atheism, leading some to set up organizations like the Society for the Suppression of Vice, to campaign for tough application of the law against atheists. One who suffered from the attentions of the Society for the Suppression of Vice was the campaigner for free speech, Richard Carlile.

Threats from the Society for the Suppression of Vice had an effect on campaigning by those pushing for a reformation of parliament. The radical poet Percy Bysshe Shelley's burlesque satire Oedipus Tyrannus; or, Swellfoot the Tyrant, which lampooned King George IV and his ministers and included in its title page "Choose Reform or Civil War" was withdrawn in 1820 by its publisher after copies were seized by Wilberforce's men and the publisher was threatened with prosecution.

The Society was involved in enforcing the stamp duty on newspapers. The campaign to abolish the stamp duty was led by the radical press. Other more establishment figures like Lord Brougham, the Lord Chancellor, 1834, also argued against it. The stamp duty was reduced to 1d in 1836 and abolished in 1855.

The Obscene Publications Act came into force in September 1857, superseding the 1787 Proclamation. One effect of the Act was to forbid the distribution of information about contraception and human biology to the working classes. The Society used the Act to take out summonses against the publishers of penny dreadfuls.

The Society was the means of suppressing "low and vicious periodicals", and of bringing the dealers to punishment, by imprisonment, hard labor and fines. The article reproduced on the Victorian London site records a list of items seized and destroyed. This included "large quantities of infidel and blasphemous publications."

In 1885 the Society was still operational to some extent, as witnessed by its low-key harassment of Sir Richard Burton and his wife upon the publication of Sir Richard's unexpurgated translation of the Arabian Nights. In August of that year, however, the Society was absorbed into the National Vigilance Association.

== Bibliography ==
- Hague, William (2007). William Wilberforce: The Life of the Great Anti-Slave Trade Campaigner. London: HarperPress. ISBN 978-0007228850. OCLC 80331607.
- Hochschild, Adam (2005). Bury the Chains: prophets and rebels in the fight to free an empire's slaves. Boston, MA: Houghton Mifflin. ISBN 0333904915.
- Pollock, John (1977). Wilberforce. New York: St. Martin's Press. ISBN 978-0094607804. OCLC 3738175.
- Roberts, M.J.D. (1983). "The Society for the Suppression of Vice and its early critics, 1802–1812". Historical Journal. 26: 159–76. doi:10.1017/s0018246x00019646.
- Roberts, M.J.D. (2004). Making English Morals: Voluntary Association And Moral Reform In England, 1787–1886. Cambridge: Cambridge University Press. ISBN 0521833892.
- Brown, Christopher Leslie (2006). Moral capital : foundations of British abolitionism. North Carolina: Chapel Hill. ISBN 978-0807856987.
