= Candaules Showing His Wife to Gyges (Jordaens) =

Painting by Jacob Jordaens

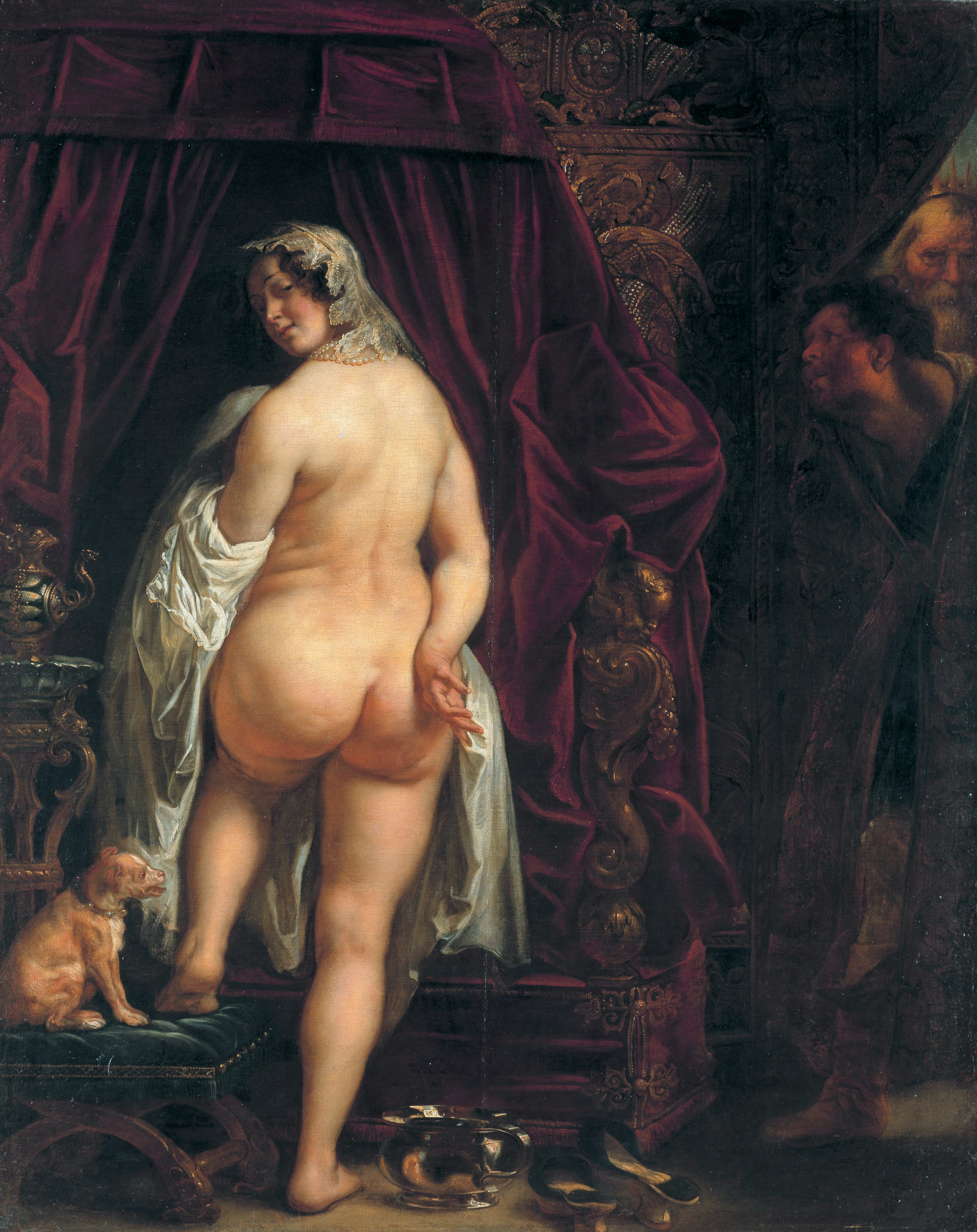
- Artist: Jacob Jordaens
- Year: c. 1646
- Type: Oil on canvas
- Movement: Flemish Baroque
- Dimensions: 193 cm × 157 cm (76 in × 62 in)
- Location: Nationalmuseum, Stockholm

Candaules Showing His Wife to Gyges is a small painting of the story of Candaules painted by Jacob Jordaens around 1646. It is in the collection of the Nationalmuseum, in Stockholm (accession number NM 1159).

== Description ==
This image illustrates Herodotus's version of the tale of Gyges. Candaules was a king of the ancient Kingdom of Lydia in the early years of the 7th century BC. Proud of his wife's (the queen's) beauty, the king had boasted about her. One of his courtiers, Gyges, had expressed some reservations about the king's boasts. Piqued by his courtier's incredulity, the king invited Gyges to see his wife's beauty with his own eyes when she was going to bed at night. He led Gyges to his wife's bedroom where he could observe her. The queen, furious with Candaules, confronted Gyges and offered him the choice to be killed or kill the king. Gyges killed the king and seized the throne, taking the widowed queen as his wife.

The painting shows the moment when the king and Gyges watch from behind a curtain how the naked queen is going to bed. The scene is placed in a 17th-century environment instead of Antiquity. The queen has her head turned towards the viewer and her gaze can be interpreted as both provocative and triumphant. Jordaens clearly has used the story as an excuse to paint his ideal nude model. A small dog with its tongue sticking out of its mouth sits at the feet of the queen.

== Provenance ==
The work was painted by Jordaens in Antwerp and delivered to the collector Martinus van Langenhoven in 1646. The work was donated to the Nationalmuseum Stockholm by count Axel Bielke in 1872.
