= Poetical Essay on the Existing State of Things =

1821 essay by Percy Bysshe Shelley

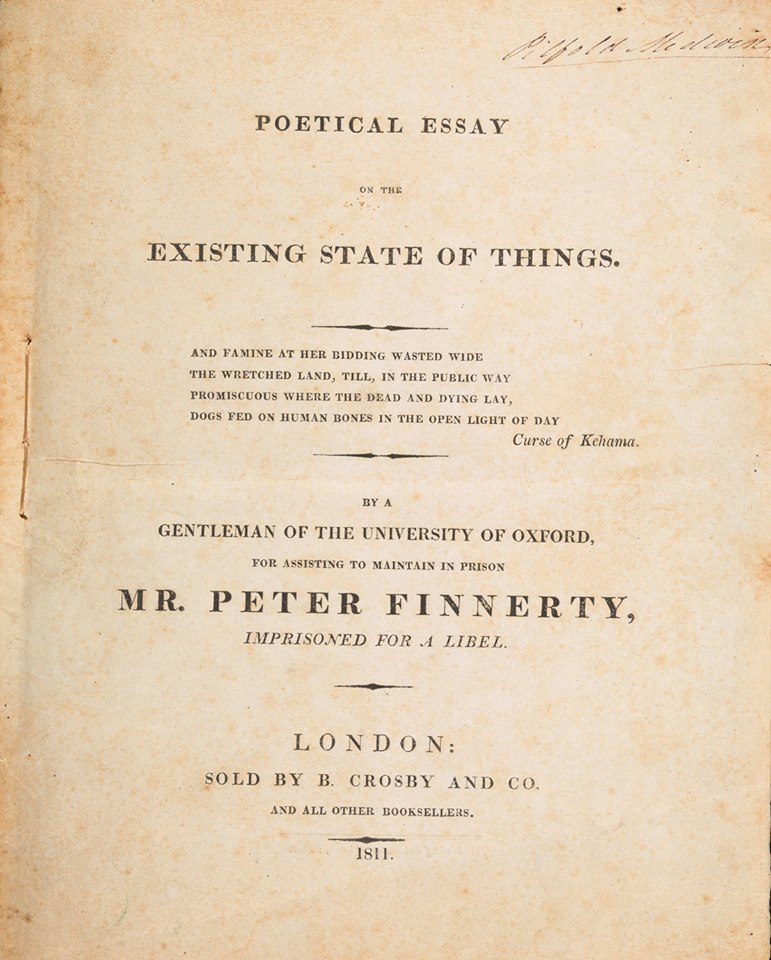
1811 title page, B. Crosby and Company, London.

"Poetical Essay on the Existing State of Things" is an essay by Percy Bysshe Shelley published as a political pamphlet in 1811 by Benjamin Crosby and Company in London. The work was lost since its first appearance until a copy was found in 2006 and made available by the Bodleian Library in 2015.

The anti-war and anti-imperialist work was intended to raise money for the radical Irish journalist Peter Finnerty, who had been imprisoned for libeling the Anglo-Irish politician Robert Stewart, Viscount Castlereagh, whom he accused of mistreating United Irish prisoners. The work is a precursor to The Masque of Anarchy, "Song to the Men of England", and "England in 1819".

Shelley would advocate for peaceful, nonviolent reform in subsequent political pamphlets, An Address, to the Irish People (1812), Proposals for an Association of Philanthropists (1812), the broadside "Declaration of Rights" (1812), and A Proposal for Putting Reform to the Vote Throughout the Kingdom (1817).

== Background ==
The work was advertised in the March 9, 1811 issue of the Oxford University and City Herald. The poem was dedicated to Harriet Westbrook: "To Harriet W[est]B[roo]K, this essay is most respectfully ascribed by the author." The title page contained an epigraph from the opening of Juvenal’s satires: Nunquam ne reponam/Vexatus toties? "Am I, who have been outraged so often, never to respond?" The essay was written "by a gentleman of the University of Oxford" whose proceeds were to be used "for assisting to maintain in prison Mr. Peter Finnerty, imprisoned for a libel". It was published and sold by B. Crosby and Company, headed by Benjamin Crosby, in London. The title page contained an epigraph from the 1810 The Curse of Kehama by Robert Southey.

Shelley gave one copy of the poem, which was published as a twenty-page pamphlet with a Preface, Notes, dedication page, and Errata page, to his cousin Pilfold Medwin, who took it to Italy. It remained lost for 204 years. It was the 12 millionth printed book added to the Bodleian Library in 2015 when its contents were made available after its purchase. The work was published anonymously as by “a gentleman of the University of Oxford”, and was only attributed to Shelley 50 years after his death. Shelley was 18 at the time he wrote it and a freshman at Oxford University.

The 172-line poem, in pentameter rhyming couplets, criticizes the British government, lack of freedom of the press, corruption, the Napoleonic War, and poverty in Britain. Shelley attacked the government, established religion, the Peninsular War, imperialism, and the monarchy. He attacks the “cold advisers of yet colder kings” who “coolly sharpen misery’s sharpest fang ... regardless of the poor man’s pang”.

In the preface, he states that the poem may appear as “subversive to the existing interests of Government" to those "who do not consider with sufficiently accurate investigation". The goal is to induce reform that would alleviate poverty and abolish persecution by "gradual yet decided intellectual assertions". Shelley opposes force because that is an assertion of power and strength and does not entail reason and rationality. He asks whether "the deprivation of liberty" is not the "deepest, the severest injuries?" Shelley calls for reforms and limits to the government: “A total reform in the licentiousness, luxury, depravity, prejudice, which involve society”.

== Summary ==
The poem opens with a description of carnage and ruin on the battlefield: "Destruction marks thee! o'er the blood-stain'd heath,/Is faintly borne the stifled wail of death." He asks if “rank corruption” shall “pass unheeded by”, mourning how “Millions to fight compell’d, to fight or die/In mangled heaps on War’s red altar lie”. "The sternly wise" and the "mildly good" have all gone to the "unfruitful mansions of the dead." Despotic governments foment wars for the benefit of a select few: "Fell Despotism sits by the red glare/Of Discord's torch, kindling the flames of war." The quest for fame, wealth, glory, and pride blinds everyone to the human costs and suffering of war, regarded as "legal murders". Shelley uses Personification to illustrate the progress of the war: "Fell Ambition o’er the wasted plain/Triumphant guide his car". War and Glory are in the ascendant while Freedom is expiring.

The French Revolution and the Napoleonic Wars had resulted in turmoil in Great Britain. The British government under Prime Minister William Pitt the Younger had raised taxes to support the war against Napoleon and had cracked down on the opposition and radicalism. Although he had died in 1806, Shelley impugns his legacy: "Pitt lends to each smooth rogue a courtier's smile." Spencer Perceval was the Tory Prime Minister of the United Kingdom in 1811 when the poem was written. He was a conservative who endorsed a rigorous prosecution of the war against France which resulted in widespread poverty and dissent on the home front. He was assassinated in 1812.

He castigates the ministers and officials in a monarchy: "Ye cold advisers of yet colder kings/To whose fell breast no passion virtue brings/Who scheme, regardless of the poor man’s pang,/Who coolly sharpen misery’s sharpest fang,/ Yourselves secure." They achieve fame and obtain the spoils of war while the people they rule bear the costs and are impoverished. They must be confronted and exposed: "Oppression’s venal minions! hence, avaunt!"

The corruption and vices of the rulers are concealed. British MP Sir Francis Burdett is applauded for his efforts in initiating a public appeal to raise funds to support journalist Peter Finnerty: “The pen of fame/On every heart has written BURDETT’S name” because "fearless, stemmed stern Despotism's course", who "traced "Oppression to its foulest source", and "bade Ambition tremble on its throne." Burdett sought to reform Parliament and combat corruption throughout his political career. He is showered with encomiums: “Thou taintless emanation from the sky!/Thou purest spark of fires which never die!”

Justice should apply "to each, to all". Despots and Tyrants should not be immune from the laws and escape judgment and justice. The murder of one person is prosecuted, yet the murder of millions of people in wars and under corrupt governments is not.

Shelley attacks British imperialism and colonialism in India: “The fainting Indian, on his native plains,/Writhes to superior power’s unnumbered pains.” He notes the exploitation and oppression: "Though hot with gore from India's wasted plains,/Some Chief, in triumph, guides the tightened reins." The Asian witnesses his wife and child torn from him but can do nothing to prevent or remedy it.

He attacks Napoleon: "May that destruction, which ‘tis thine to spread/Descend with ten-fold fury on thy head". Napoleon "calm can war" and "can misery pour" and can compel "a world to bleed". "In Europe too wild ruin rushes fast" like "an evil spirit brooding over gore". "May curses blast thee." The fall of Napoleon will show that oppression can be overthrown.

Reason has to be applied: "Let Reason mount the Despot’s mouldering throne/And bid an injured nation cease to moan". Rationality “must diffuse light, as human eyes are capable of bearing it." But that is not enough. Men have natural rights that monarchs cannot take away. These are rights that must be acknowledged: "Man must assert his native rights, must say/We take from Monarchs’ hand the granted sway."

Security can only be found in laws: "Oppressive law no more shall power retain." Citizens can only safeguard their freedoms and liberties by a reliance on the reform of the laws.

In conclusion, Shelley asserts that "peace, love, and accord, once shall rule again" and "error's night turned to virtue's day."

== Rediscovery ==
The rediscovery of the work in 2006 and its release to the public in 2015 were regarded as major literary events in English and world literature because of Percy Bysshe Shelley's central role in the Romantic Movement. The poem has been analyzed and reevaluated by literary scholars such as Michael Rossington and Michael Rosen. The work was the 12th millionth book added to the Bodleian Library at Oxford University, donated by Brian Fenwick-Smith. Vanessa Redgrave read selections from the poem on BBC 4.

John Mullin in "Shelley’s long-lost poem – a document for our own time (and any other)" argued that the work was relevant and contemporary and that the themes and issues that Shelley addressed were timeless. The poem was seen as an important work in the author's canon that showed the development and evolution of his political views.

== Sources ==
- Bieri, James. Percy Bysshe Shelley: A Biography: Youth's Unextinguished Fire, 1792-1816. Second printing. Newark, DE: University of Delaware Press, 2006, p. 152.
- Crook, Nora. "Shelley’s Hidden Blade: Poetical Essay on the Existing State of Things." The Keats-Shelley Review 30.1 (2016): 21-28.
- MacCarthy, Denis Florence. Shelley’s Early Life, London: John Camden Hotten, 1872.
- Mulhallen, Jacqueline. Percy Bysshe Shelley: Poet and Revolutionary. London: Pluto Books, 2015.
- Mullan, John. "Shelley’s long-lost poem – a document for our own time (and any other)", The Guardian, November 11, 2015. Retrieved 22 July, 2017.
- O’Neill, Michael, Anthony, Howe, editors, with assistance from Callahan, Madeleine. The Oxford Handbook of Percy Bysshe Shelley. Oxford: Oxford University Press, 2013, p. 21.
- Rosen, Michael. "Shelley’s ‘Lost’ Poem: A Talk at the 2019 Keats-Shelley Awards." The Keats-Shelley Review 34.2 (2020): 82-87.
- Rossetti, William Michael, ed. The Complete Poetical Works of Percy Bysshe Shelley. London: John Slark, 1881, p. 21.
- Rossington, M. "Introduction to Shelley's Poetical Essay on the Existing State of Things (1811) in 'About the Text', Shelley's Poetical Essay: The Bodleian Libraries' 12 millionth book." (2015). eprints.ncl.ac.uk
- Sridevi, S. "Percy Bysshe Shelley: Romanticism and Enlightenment Philosophy of Liberty." Language in India 23.12 (2023).
- Tobias, Michael Charles, and Jane Gray Morrison. "Shelley’s Ecological Exile and His Utopia of Animal Rights." On the Nature of Ecological Paradox. Cham: Springer International Publishing, 2021. 341-350.
- Vaughan, Percy. Early Shelley Pamphlets. London: Watts, 1905.
- Westwood, Daniel. "Jacqueline Mulhallen, Percy Bysshe Shelley: Poet and Revolutionary." (2019): 109-111. euppublishing.com
- Wilcockson, Amy. "Shelley's Living Artistry: Letters, Poems, Plays by Madeleine Callaghan." The Byron Journal 48.1 (2020): 82-84.
- Worthen, John. The Life of Percy Bysshe Shelley: A Critical Biography. Hoboken, NJ: John Wiley & Sons, 2019.
