= A Proposal for Putting Reform to the Vote Throughout the Kingdom =

1817 political pamphlet by Percy Bysshe Shelley

- The 1817 first edition title page of A Proposal for Putting Reform to the Vote Throughout the Kingdom, London, UK.
- Author: Percy Bysshe Shelley under the pseudonym The Hermit of Marlow
- Language: English
- Published: 1817
- Publisher: Charles and James Ollier
- Publication place: United Kingdom
- Pages: 13

"A Proposal for Putting Reform to the Vote Throughout the Kingdom" is an 1817 political pamphlet by the Romantic poet Percy Bysshe Shelley published under the pen name "The Hermit of Marlow" by Charles and James Ollier in London. It called for a national referendum on parliamentary reform, urging that the people directly voice their desire for expanded voting rights and a more inclusive and equitable government.

Shelley proposed a nationwide vote to determine if the public wanted a reformed parliament. He advocated for extending the right to vote to a much larger share of the population. He sought to reform the political system through peaceful, nonviolent change using open and rational public procedures rather than violent revolution.

It was written during an era and historical context of social unrest and economic hardship and turmoil in post Napoleonic war Britain. Shelley's goal was to bypass an entrenched government by allowing the collective voice of the citizens to demand true representation.

== Background ==
The pamphlet reflects Shelley's political activism and advocacy that began in 1812 with An Address, to the Irish People, Proposals for an Association of Philanthropists, and "Declaration of Rights". It would reach its climax after the Peterloo Massacre with the publication of The Masque of Anarchy, "Song to the Men of England", and "England in 1819".

Shelley wrote the pamphlet when he lived in Albion House on West Street in Great Marlow, Buckinghamshire, beginning on March 18, 1817. He left Marlow for London in February 1818, before moving to Italy.

He also wrote Laon and Cythna, revised as The Revolt of Islam (1817), there, as well as An Address to the People on the Death of the Princess Charlotte (1817), and began Rosalind and Helen, A Modern Eclogue (1817). He also wrote the Preface to History of a Six Weeks' Tour (1817) and the Preface to Frankenstein (1818) at the Albion House leaving off his name but noting the location and date: "Marlow, September, 1817".

The historical background of 1817 Britain was defined by severe economic depression, widespread social unrest, and intense government repression following the end of the Napoleonic Wars in 1815. There was a post-war economic collapse in England which resulted in mass unemployment. The demobilization of over 300,000 soldiers and sailors inundated the labor market that was unable to accommodate the influx of workers. The Corn Laws, passed in 1815 to protect English farmers, banned grain imports which were lower priced, which kept domestic bread prices artificially inflated and impacting the working classes disproportionately. Industrial downsizing occurred due to the reduced manufacture of war-related products causing factories to close, wages to be cut, and greater impoverishment.

The decline in living standards led to a rise in radicalism and demands for reform. Working-class citizens and radical reformers demanded the right to vote to break the political monopoly of wealthy landowners. In March 1817, textile workers marched from Manchester to London to petition the Prince Regent for economic relief, known as The Blanketeers March. This culminated in the Pentrich Rising, an armed revolt of Derbyshire workers in June 1817, incited by a government spy and deteriorating economic conditions.

The government responded to the unrest by state repression and the Gagging Acts. Habeas Corpus was suspended which allowed the government to imprison political activists without charges. The 1817 Gagging Acts banned unauthorized public meetings and made it illegal to speak or write against the government. The government relied on spies and informers such as "Oliver the Spy" to infiltrate radical groups and entrap its members.

It was in this context of suppression and economic hardship that Shelley published the pamphlet to alleviate these problems by means of peaceful, and nonviolent reforms that could be enacted by voting, through ballots not bullets. His focus in the pamphlet was on achieving social justice, political reform, and voicing his opposition to institutional inequality.

== Publication history ==
It was published in March, 1817 in pamphlet form by Charles and James Ollier in London. Shelley’s first publication with the Olliers, it was printed by Carew Henry Reynell, which he wanted distributed to newspapers and Members of Parliament, selling for one shilling.

In 1887, The Shelley Society published a facsimile of the manuscript of A Proposal for Putting Reform to the Vote Throughout the Kingdom edited and with an introduction by Harry Buxton Forman in London by Reeves and Turner.

It was republished in The Prose Works of Percy Bysshe Shelley: From the Original Editions edited by Richard Herne Shepherd in London by Chatto and Windus in 1888.

== Summary ==
He begins by stating that "a great question" confronts the nation which no man or group of men can decide. "Every one is agreed that the House of Commons is not a representation of the people." Parliament in turn holds the people in contempt. How is effective representation then to be achieved? He posed this question: "The question now at issue is, whether the majority of the adult individuals of the United Kingdom of Great Britain and Ireland desire or no a complete representation in the Legislative Assembly."

He called for public meetings and petitions to gauge the true will of the English people regarding suffrage expansion, planning to avert violent revolution through peaceful, nonviolent democratic consensus. A core idea of the pamphlet was a national referendum. Shelley proposed organizing a collective nationwide vote to determine the exact level of public desire for parliamentary reform. His objective was peaceful, nonviolent change, averting bloodshed and the loss of life. His goal was to channel public dissent and grievances into a formal and structured voting process. A rebellion or revolution would thereby be prevented.

A key proposal was to make the House of Commons representative of the people, attacking "the corrupt and inadequate manner" in which Members are chosen.

He proposed a limited and cautious suffrage. He rejected a demand for immediate and unlimited universal suffrage. Instead, Shelley advocated for a measured approach: "With respect to Universal Suffrage, I confess I consider its adoption, in the present unprepared state of public knowledge and feeling, a measure fraught with peril." A realistic and pragmatic solution was needed that would take into account the lack of experience and knowledge of the population. A gradual preparation was required first. Changes in voting rights would not occur until the 1832 Reform Bill.

He called for public mobilization to encourage citizens to use legal means like petitions and public assemblies to redress their grievances.

Shelley argued that "a pure republic" was most conducive to producing "happiness" and promoting "the genuine eminence of man": "abstractedly it is the right of every human being to have a share in the government. But Mr. Paine's arguments are also unanswerable; a pure republic may be shown, by inferences the most obvious and irresistible, to be that system of social order the fittest to produce the happiness and promote the genuine eminence of man."

He emphasized that it is a decision or choice that the people must make on how to alleviate their circumstances: "let it belong to them to pursue and develop all suggestions relating to the great cause of liberty which has been nurtured (I am scarcely conscious of a metaphor) with their very sweat, and blood, and tears: some have tended it in dungeons, others have cherished it in famine, all have been constant to it amidst persecution and calumny, and in the face of the sanctions of power : — so accomplish what ye have begun."

== Sources ==
- Aryan, Ayaz Ahmad, Liaqat Iqbal, and Rafiq Nawab. "Moral and Political System as Objects of Aesthetic Beauty and the Case of Shelly." Global Language Review 5.2 (2020): 72-82.
- Cameron, Kenneth Neill. "Shelley and the Reformers." ELH 12.1 (1945): 62-85.
- Canani, Marco. "Conflict and Peaceful Democracy: Percy Bysshe Shelley's Discourse of Sustainable Progressivism." Questione Romantica 16 (2024).
- Chun Min, Byoung. "Beyond an Intellectual Bourgeois Public Sphere: Percy Bysshe Shelley’s ‘Hermit of Marlow’ Pamphlets." The Keats-Shelley Review 28.2 (2014): 86-103.
- Dawson, P. M. S. The Unacknowledged Legislator: Shelley and Politics. Oxford: Clarendon Press, 1980.
- Duff, David. Romance and Revolution: Shelley and the Politics of a Genre. Cambridge: Cambridge University Press, 2005.
- Fraistat, Neil. "Shelley Left and Right: The Rhetorics of the Early Textual Editions." In Shelley: Poet and Legislator of the World, ed. by Betty T. Bennett and Stuart Curran. Baltimore: Johns Hopkins University Press, 1996, pp. 105–13.
- Guinn, John Pollard. Shelley's Political Thought. The Hague: Mouton, 1969.
- Hoagwood, Terence. Skepticism and Ideology: Shelley’s Political Prose and Its Philosophical Context from Bacon to Marx. Iowa City: University of Iowa Press, 1988.
- McNiece, Gerald. "Shelley and Nonviolence." In Studies in English Literature. (1977): 120-122.
- Ngide, George Ewane. "Romanticism and Nonviolence: Percy Bysshe Shelley Exhumed." International Journal of Literature and Art (Volume 12, Issue 2), 11 April 2024, pp. 16-26.
- Peterson, Susan Joan. "From discourse to activism: Trajectories of Percy Bysshe Shelley's nonviolence philosophy in literatures of resistance". University of Rhode Island. 2004. Dissertation. https://digitalcommons.uri.edu/oa_diss/1961/
- Priestman, Martin. "A Place to Stand: Questions of Address in Shelley’s Political Pamphlets." The Unfamiliar Shelley. Routledge, 2016. 221-238.
- Salah, Saman, and Y. J. Yusoff. "Reform for Freedom in P.B. Shelley’s Literary Works." Journal of Advanced Research Design 27.1 (2016): 14-18.
- Scrivener, Michael Henry. "Radical Shelley: The philosophical anarchism and utopian thought of Percy Bysshe Shelley." (2014): 1-370.
- Silver, Colin. "John Keats and his Publishers". Wordsworth Grasmere. 24th April 2019.
- Spiridon, Monica. "The Romantic Pamphlet." Nonfictional Romantic Prose: Expanding Borders. (2004): 317.
- Stroup, William James, "Shelley and the Nature of Nonviolence" (2000). University of New Hampshire. Doctoral Dissertations. 2145. https://scholars.unh.edu/dissertation/2145
- Vogel, Mary Ursula, "Shelley as a Critic of Society and Politics" (1940). Master's Theses. 704. ecommons.luc.edu
- Young, Art. Shelley and Nonviolence. The Hague: Mouton, 1975.
