= Percy Bysshe Shelley =

English poet (1792–1822)

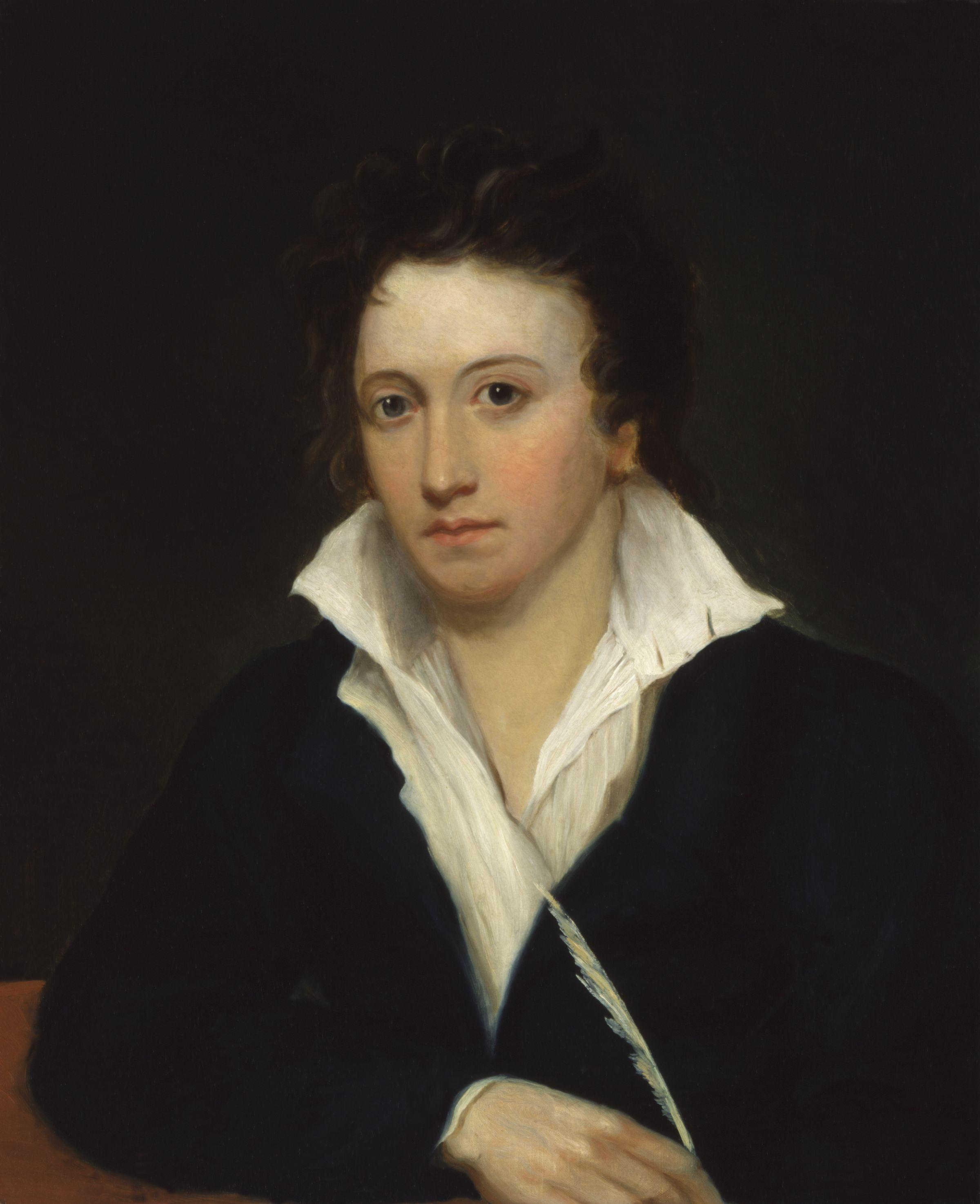
- Shelley in 1819
- Born: 4 August 1792; Field Place, Sussex, England
- Died: 8 July 1822 (aged 29); Gulf of La Spezia, Kingdom of Sardinia
- Education: University College, Oxford
- Occupation: Author
- Spouses: Harriet Westbrook (m. 1811; died 1816); Mary Shelley (née Godwin) (m. 1816)
- Children: 6, including Sir Percy, 3rd Baronet
- Parent(s): Timothy Shelley; Elizabeth Pilfold
- Writing career
- Movement: Romanticism

Percy Bysshe Shelley (/bɪʃ/ BISH; 4 August 1792 – 8 July 1822) was an English writer who is considered one of the major English Romantic poets. A radical in his poetry as well as in his political and social views, Shelley did not achieve fame during his lifetime, but recognition of his achievements in poetry grew steadily following his death, and he became an important influence on subsequent generations of poets, including Robert Browning, Algernon Charles Swinburne, Thomas Hardy, and W. B. Yeats. American literary critic Harold Bloom describes him as "a superb craftsman, a lyric poet without rival, and surely one of the most advanced sceptical intellects ever to write a poem."

Shelley's reputation fluctuated during the 20th century, but since the 1960s he has achieved increasing critical acclaim for the sweeping momentum of his poetic imagery, his mastery of genres and verse forms, and the complex interplay of sceptical, idealist, and materialist ideas in his work. Among his best-known poetic works are the long poems Alastor, or The Spirit of Solitude (1816), Julian and Maddalo (1818–19), The Mask of Anarchy (1819), Adonais (1821) and The Triumph of Life (1822); the short poems "Ozymandias" (1818), "Ode to the West Wind" (1819) and "To a Skylark" (1820); and the verse dramas The Cenci (1819), Prometheus Unbound (1820) and Hellas (1822).

Shelley also wrote prose fiction and a quantity of essays on political, social, and philosophical issues. Much of this poetry and prose was not published in his lifetime, or only published in expurgated form, due to the risk of prosecution for political and religious libel. From the 1820s, his poems and political and ethical writings became popular in Owenist, Chartist, and radical political circles, and later drew admirers as diverse as Karl Marx, Mahatma Gandhi, and George Bernard Shaw.

Shelley's life was marked by family crises, ill health, and a backlash against his avowed atheism, political views, and defiance of social conventions. He went into permanent self-exile in Italy in 1818 and over the next four years produced what Zachary Leader and Michael O'Neill call "some of the finest poetry of the Romantic period". His second wife, Mary Shelley, was the author of Frankenstein. He died in a boating accident in 1822 at age 29.

== Life ==
=== Early life and education ===
Shelley was born on 4 August 1792 at Field Place, Warnham, Sussex, England. He was the eldest son of Sir Timothy Shelley, 2nd Baronet of Castle Goring, a Whig Member of Parliament for Horsham from 1790 to 1792 and for Shoreham between 1806 and 1812, and his wife, Elizabeth Pilfold, the daughter of a successful butcher. He had four younger sisters and one much younger brother. Shelley's early childhood was sheltered and mostly happy. He was particularly close to his sisters and his mother, who encouraged him to hunt, fish and ride. At age six, he was sent to a day school run by the vicar of Warnham church, where he displayed an impressive memory and gift for languages.

In 1802, he entered the Syon House Academy of Brentford, Middlesex, where his cousin Thomas Medwin was a pupil. Shelley was bullied and unhappy at the school and sometimes responded with violent rage. He also began suffering from the nightmares, hallucinations and sleep walking that were to periodically affect him throughout his life. Shelley developed an interest in science which supplemented his voracious reading of tales of mystery, romance and the supernatural. During his holidays at Field Place, his sisters were often terrified at being subjected to his experiments with gunpowder, acids and electricity. Back at school he blew up a paling fence with gunpowder.

In 1804, Shelley entered Eton College, a period which he later recalled with loathing. He was subjected to particularly severe mob bullying which the perpetrators called "Shelley-baits". A number of biographers and contemporaries have attributed the bullying to Shelley's aloofness, nonconformity and refusal to take part in fagging. His peculiarities and violent rages earned him the nickname "Mad Shelley". His interest in the occult and science continued, and contemporaries describe him giving an electric shock to a master, blowing up a tree stump with gunpowder and attempting to raise spirits with occult rituals. In his senior years, Shelley came under the influence of a part-time teacher, James Lind, who encouraged his interest in the occult and introduced him to liberal and radical authors. Shelley also developed an interest in Plato and idealist philosophy which he pursued in later years through self-study. According to Richard Holmes, Shelley, by his leaving year, had gained a reputation as a classical scholar and a tolerated eccentric.

In his last term at Eton, his first novel Zastrozzi appeared and he had established a following among his fellow pupils. Prior to enrolling for University College, Oxford, in October 1810, Shelley completed Original Poetry by Victor and Cazire (written with his sister Elizabeth), the verse melodrama The Wandering Jew and the gothic novel St. Irvine; or, The Rosicrucian: A Romance (published 1811).

At Oxford, Shelley attended few lectures, instead spending long hours reading and conducting scientific experiments in the laboratory he set up in his room. He met a fellow student, Thomas Jefferson Hogg, who became his closest friend. Shelley became increasingly politicised under Hogg's influence, developing strong radical and anti-Christian views. Such views were dangerous in the reactionary political climate prevailing during Britain's war with Napoleonic France, and Shelley's father warned him against Hogg's influence.

In the winter of 1810–1811, Shelley published a series of anonymous political poems and tracts: Posthumous Fragments of Margaret Nicholson, The Necessity of Atheism (written in collaboration with Hogg) and A Poetical Essay on the Existing State of Things. Shelley mailed The Necessity of Atheism to all the bishops and heads of colleges at Oxford, and he was called to appear before the college's fellows, including the Dean, George Rowley. His refusal to answer questions put by college authorities regarding whether or not he authored the pamphlet resulted in his expulsion from Oxford on 25 March 1811, along with Hogg. Hearing of his son's expulsion, Shelley's father threatened to cut all contact with Shelley unless he agreed to return home and study under tutors appointed by him. Shelley's refusal to do so led to a falling-out with his father.

=== Marriage to Harriet Westbrook ===
In late December 1810, Shelley had met Harriet Westbrook, a pupil at the same boarding school as his sisters. They corresponded frequently that winter and also after Shelley had been expelled from Oxford. Shelley expounded his radical ideas on politics, religion and marriage to Harriet, and they gradually convinced each other that she was oppressed by her father and at school. Shelley's infatuation with Harriet developed in the months following his expulsion, when he was under severe emotional strain due to the conflict with his family, his bitterness over the breakdown of his romance with his cousin Harriet Grove, and his unfounded belief that he might have a fatal illness. At the same time, Harriet Westbrook's elder sister Eliza, to whom Harriet was very close, encouraged the young girl's romance with Shelley. Shelley's correspondence with Harriet intensified in July, while he was holidaying in Wales, and in response to her urgent pleas for his protection, he returned to London in early August. Putting aside his philosophical objections to matrimony, he left with the 16-year-old Harriet for Edinburgh, Scotland, on 25 August 1811, and they were married there on 28 August.

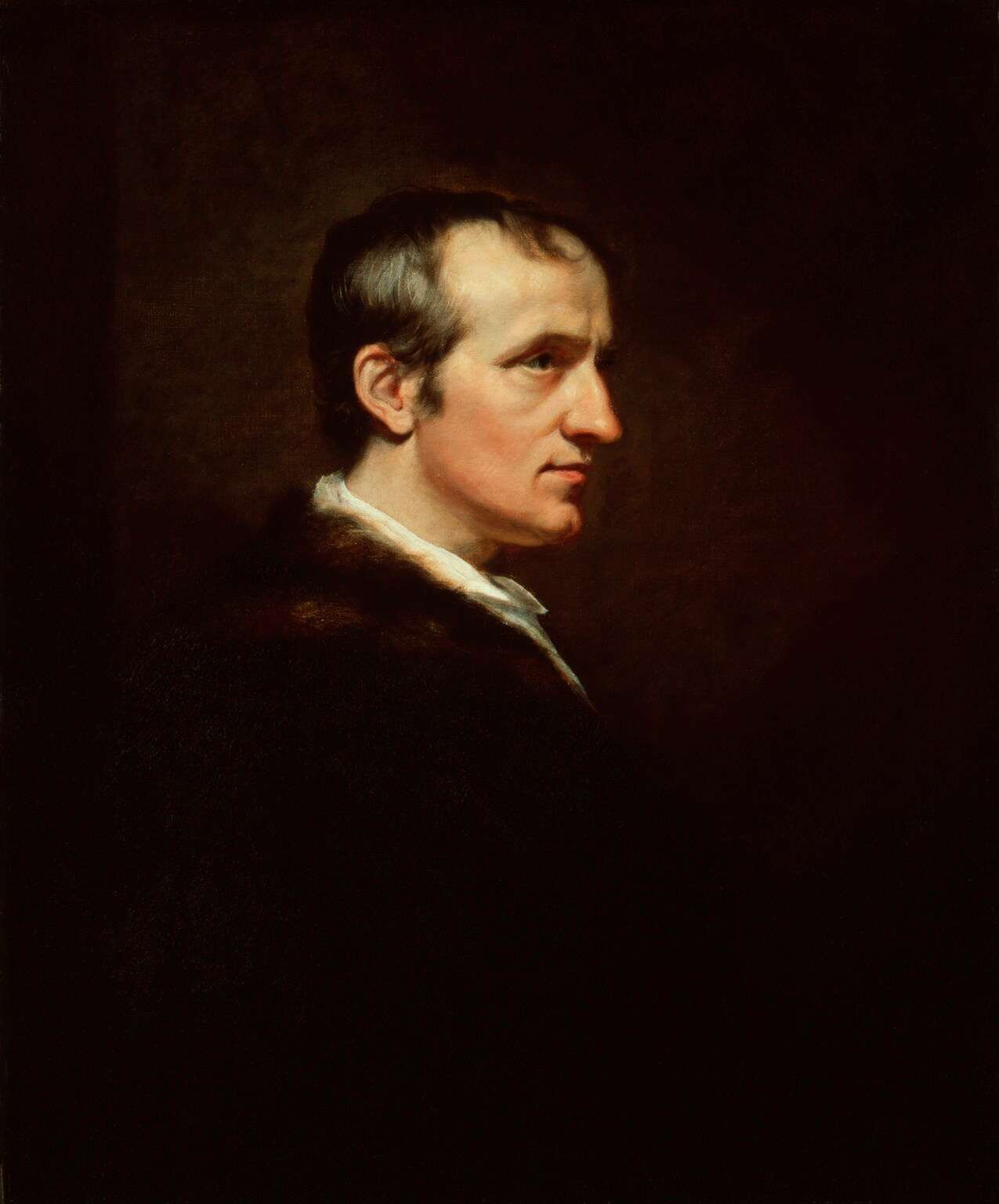
William Godwin in 1802, by James Northcote

Hearing of the elopement, Harriet's father, John Westbrook, and Shelley's father, Timothy, cut off the allowances of the bride and groom. (Shelley's father believed his son had married beneath him, as Harriet's father had earned his fortune in trade and was the owner of a tavern and coffee house.) Surviving on borrowed money, Shelley and Harriet stayed in Edinburgh for a month, with Hogg living under the same roof. The trio left for York in October, and Shelley went on to Sussex to settle matters with his father, leaving Harriet behind with Hogg. Shelley returned from his unsuccessful excursion to find that Eliza had moved in with Harriet and Hogg. Harriet confessed that Hogg had tried to seduce her while Shelley had been away. Shelley, Harriet and Eliza soon left for Keswick in the Lake District, leaving Hogg in York.

For a year from June 1811, Shelley was also involved in an intense platonic relationship with Elizabeth Hitchener, a 28-year-old unmarried schoolteacher with whom he was corresponding frequently. Hitchener became his confidante and intellectual companion as he developed his views on politics, religion, ethics and personal relationships. Shelley became increasingly radicalised as the war with Napoleon brought economic recession, food riots, and government suppression of political dissent. He proposed that Hitchener join him, Harriet and Eliza in a communal household where all property would be shared.

The Shelleys and Eliza spent December and January in Keswick where Shelley visited Robert Southey, whose poetry he admired. Southey was taken with Shelley, even though there was a wide gulf between them politically, and predicted great things for him as a poet. Southey also informed Shelley that William Godwin, author of Political Justice, which had greatly influenced him in his youth, and which Shelley also admired, was still alive. Shelley wrote to Godwin, offering himself as his devoted disciple. Godwin, who had modified many of his earlier radical views, advised Shelley to reconcile with his father, become a scholar before he published anything else, and give up his avowed plans for political agitation in Ireland.

Meanwhile, Shelley had met his father's patron, Charles Howard, 11th Duke of Norfolk, who helped secure the reinstatement of Shelley's allowance. With Harriet's allowance also restored, Shelley now had the funds for his Irish venture. Their departure for Ireland was precipitated by increasing hostility towards the Shelley household from their landlord and neighbours who were alarmed by Shelley's scientific experiments, pistol shooting and radical political views. As tension mounted, Shelley claimed he had been attacked in his home by ruffians, an event which might have been real or a delusional episode triggered by stress. This was the first of a series of episodes in subsequent years where Shelley claimed to have been attacked by strangers during periods of personal crisis.

Early in 1812, Shelley wrote, published and with Harriet personally distributed in Dublin two political tracts: An Address, to the Irish People; and Proposals for an Association of Philanthropists. He also delivered a speech at a meeting of Daniel O'Connell's Catholic Committee. In these he called for Catholic emancipation, repeal of the Acts of Union, and an end to the oppression of the Irish poor while cautioning against a resort to violence. Reports of Shelley's subversive activities were sent to the Home Secretary.

Returning from Ireland, the Shelley household travelled to Wales, then to the small coastal village of Lynmouth in Devon. Here they were joined by Hitchener, and again came under government surveillance for distributing subversive literature. After several months, Hitchener had a falling out with the Shelleys and left. When Shelley's 15-year-old Irish servant was arrested for distributing Shelley's Declaration of Rights and his ballad attacking the government, The Devil's Walk, Shelley and his companions fled. (Note: Shelley attempted to distribute these works by various methods including setting them adrift in sealed bottles, miniature boats and hand-made balloons. His Irish servant, Dan Healy, was arrested and spent six months in jail after being caught posting the broadsheets in a nearby town.) In September 1812, the Shelley household had settled in Tremadog, Wales, where Shelley worked on Queen Mab, a utopian allegory with extensive notes preaching atheism, free love, republicanism and vegetarianism. The poem was published the following year in a private edition of 250 copies, although few were initially distributed because of the risk of prosecution for seditious and religious libel.

In February 1813, Shelley claimed he was attacked in his home at night. The incident might have been real, a hallucination brought on by stress, or a hoax staged by Shelley in order to escape government surveillance, creditors and his entanglements in local politics. The Shelleys and Eliza fled to Ireland, then London. Back in England, Shelley's debts mounted as he tried unsuccessfully to reach a financial settlement with his father. On 23 June, Harriet gave birth to a girl, Eliza Ianthe Shelley (known as Ianthe), and in the following months the relationship between Shelley and his wife deteriorated. Shelley resented the influence Harriet's sister had over her while Harriet was alienated from Shelley by his close friendship with an attractive widow, Mrs. Harriet de Boinville. Mrs. Boinville had married a French revolutionary émigré and hosted a salon, where Shelley was able to discuss politics, philosophy and vegetarianism. Mrs. Boinville became a confidante of Shelley during his marital crisis. During a breakdown, Shelley moved into Mrs. Boinville's home outside London. In February and March 1814, he became infatuated with her married daughter, Cornelia Turner, aged 18, and wrote erotic poetry about her in his notebook.

Following Ianthe's birth, the Shelleys moved frequently across London, Wales, the Lake District, Scotland and Berkshire to escape creditors and search for a home. In March 1814, Shelley remarried Harriet in London to settle any doubts about the legality of their Edinburgh wedding and secure the rights of their child. Nevertheless, the Shelleys lived apart for most of the following months, and Shelley reflected bitterly on "my rash & heartless union with Harriet".

Richard Rothwell's portrait of Mary Shelley in later life was shown at the Royal Academy in 1840, accompanied by lines from Percy Shelley's poem The Revolt of Islam calling her a "child of love and light".

=== Elopement with Mary Godwin ===
In May 1814, Shelley began visiting his mentor, William Godwin, almost daily. He soon fell in love with Godwin's sixteen-year-old daughter, Mary, whose mother was the late feminist writer Mary Wollstonecraft. Shelley and Mary declared their love for each other during a visit to her mother's grave in the churchyard of St Pancras Old Church on 26 June. When Shelley told Godwin that he intended to leave Harriet and live with Mary, his mentor banished him from the house and forbade Mary from seeing him. Shelley and Mary eloped to Europe on 28 July, taking Mary's step-sister Claire Clairmont with them. Before leaving, Shelley had secured a loan of £3,000 but had left most of the funds at the disposal of Godwin and Harriet, who was again pregnant. The financial arrangement with Godwin led to rumours that he had sold his daughters to Shelley.

Shelley, Mary and Claire made their way across war-ravaged France, where Shelley wrote to Harriet, asking her to meet them in Switzerland with the money he had left for her. Hearing nothing from Harriet in Switzerland, and unable to secure sufficient funds or suitable accommodation, the three travelled to Germany and Holland, before returning to England on 13 September.

Shelley spent the next few months trying to raise loans and avoid bailiffs. Mary was pregnant, lonely, depressed and ill. Her mood was not improved when she heard that, on 30 November, Harriet had given birth to Charles Bysshe Shelley, heir to the Shelley fortune and baronetcy. This was followed, in early January 1815, by news that Shelley's grandfather, Sir Bysshe, had died leaving an estate worth £220,000. The settlement of the estate, and a financial settlement between Shelley and his father (now Sir Timothy), however, was not concluded until April the following year.

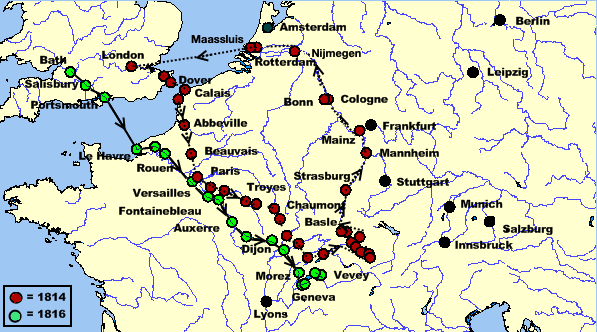
Routes of the 1814 and 1816 continental tours

In February 1815, Mary gave premature birth to a baby girl who died ten days later, deepening her depression. In the following weeks, Mary became close to Hogg who temporarily moved into the household. Shelley was almost certainly having a sexual relationship with Claire at this time, and it is possible that Mary, with Shelley's encouragement, was also having a sexual relationship with Hogg. In May Claire left the household, at Mary's insistence, to reside in Lynmouth.

In August, Shelley and Mary moved to Bishopsgate, where Shelley worked on Alastor, a long poem in blank verse based on the myth of Narcissus and Echo. Alastor was published in an edition of 250 copies in early 1816 to poor sales and largely unfavourable reviews from the conservative press.

On 24 January 1816, Mary gave birth to William Shelley. Shelley was delighted to have another son, but was suffering from the strain of prolonged financial negotiations with his father, Harriet and William Godwin. Shelley showed signs of delusional behaviour and was contemplating an escape to the continent.

=== Byron ===
Claire initiated a sexual relationship with Lord Byron in April 1816, just before his self-exile on the continent, and then arranged for Byron to meet Shelley, Mary, and her in Geneva. Shelley admired Byron's poetry and had sent him Queen Mab and other poems. Shelley's party arrived in Geneva in May and rented a house close to Villa Diodati, on the shores of Lake Geneva, where Byron was staying. There Shelley, Byron and the others engaged in discussions about literature, science and "various philosophical doctrines". One night, while Byron was reciting Coleridge's Christabel, Shelley suffered a severe panic attack with hallucinations. The previous night Mary had had a more productive vision or nightmare which inspired her novel Frankenstein.

Shelley and Byron then took a boating tour around Lake Geneva, which inspired Shelley to write his "Hymn to Intellectual Beauty", his first substantial poem since Alastor. A tour of Chamonix inspired "Mont Blanc", which has been described as an atheistic response to Coleridge's "Hymn before Sunrise in the Vale of Chamoni". During this tour, Shelley often signed guest books with a declaration that he was an atheist. These declarations were seen by other British tourists, including Southey, which hardened attitudes against Shelley back home.

Relations between Byron and Shelley's party became strained when Byron was told that Claire was pregnant with his child. Shelley, Mary, and Claire left Switzerland in late August, with arrangements for the expected baby still unclear, although Shelley made provision for Claire and the baby in his will. In January 1817 Claire gave birth to a daughter by Byron whom she named Alba, but later renamed Allegra in accordance with Byron's wishes.

=== Marriage to Mary Godwin ===
Ozymandias

I met a traveller from an antique land,
Who said—"Two vast and trunkless legs of stone
Stand in the desart.... Near them, on the sand,
Half sunk a shattered visage lies, whose frown,
And wrinkled lip, and sneer of cold command,
Tell that its sculptor well those passions read
Which yet survive, stamped on these lifeless things,
The hand that mocked them, and the heart that fed;
And on the pedestal, these words appear:
My name is Ozymandias, King of Kings;
Look on my Works, ye Mighty, and despair!
Nothing beside remains. Round the decay
Of that colossal Wreck, boundless and bare
The lone and level sands stretch far away."

— Percy Bysshe Shelley, 1818

Shelley and Mary returned to England in September 1816, and in early October they heard that Mary's half-sister Fanny Imlay had killed herself. Godwin believed that Fanny had been in love with Shelley, and Shelley himself suffered depression and guilt over her death, writing: "Friend had I known thy secret grief / Should we have parted so." Further tragedy followed in December when Shelley's estranged wife Harriet drowned herself in the Serpentine. Harriet, pregnant and living alone at the time, believed that she had been abandoned by her new lover. In her suicide letter she asked Shelley to take custody of their son Charles but to leave their daughter in her sister Eliza's care.

Shelley married Mary Godwin on 30 December, despite his philosophical objections to the institution. The marriage was intended to help secure Shelley's custody of his children by Harriet and to placate Godwin who had refused to see Shelley and Mary because of their previous adulterous relationship. After a prolonged legal battle, the Court of Chancery eventually awarded custody of Shelley and Harriet's children to foster parents, on the grounds that Shelley had abandoned his first wife for Mary without cause and was an atheist.

In March 1817, the Shelleys moved to the village of Marlow, Buckinghamshire, where Shelley's friend Thomas Love Peacock lived. The Shelley household included Claire and her baby Allegra, both of whose presence Mary resented. Shelley's generosity with money and increasing debts also led to financial and marital stress, as did Godwin's frequent requests for financial help.

On 2 September, Mary gave birth to a daughter, Clara Everina Shelley. Soon afterwards, Shelley left for London with Claire, which increased Mary's resentment towards her stepsister. Shelley was arrested for two days in London over money he owed, and attorneys visited Mary in Marlow over Shelley's debts.

Shelley took part in the literary and political circle that surrounded Leigh Hunt, and during this period he met William Hazlitt and John Keats. Shelley's major work during this time was Laon and Cythna, a long narrative poem featuring incest and attacks on religion. It was hastily withdrawn after publication due to fears of prosecution for religious libel, and was re-edited and reissued as The Revolt of Islam in January 1818. Shelley also published two political tracts under a pseudonym: A Proposal for putting Reform to the Vote throughout the Kingdom (March 1817) and An Address to the People on the Death of Princess Charlotte (November 1817). In December he wrote "Ozymandias", which is considered to be one of his finest sonnets, as part of a competition with friend and fellow poet Horace Smith.

=== Italy ===
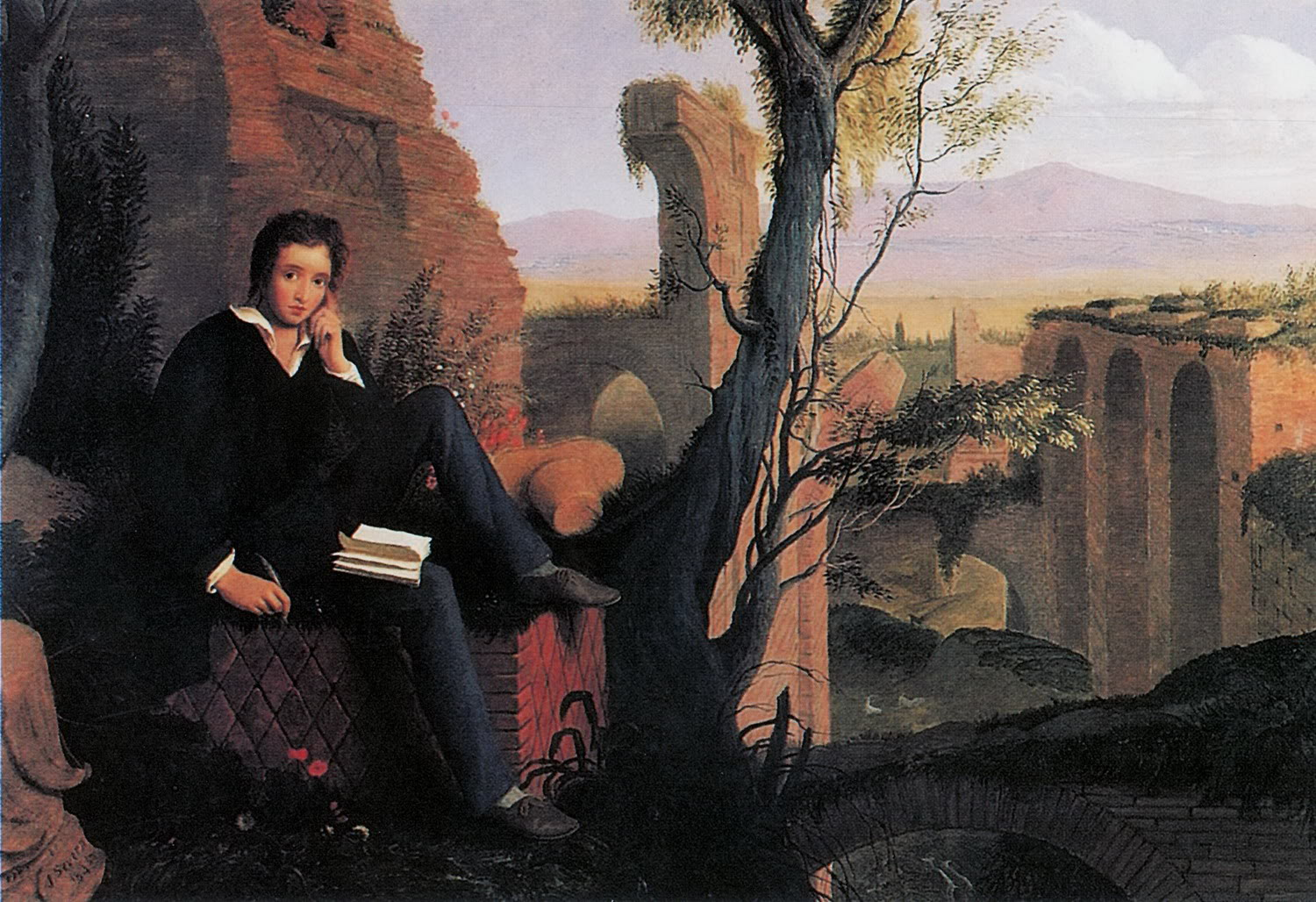
Posthumous Portrait of Shelley Writing Prometheus Unbound in Italy – painting by Joseph Severn, 1845

On 12 March 1818, the Shelleys and Claire left England to escape its "tyranny civil and religious". A doctor had also recommended that Shelley go to Italy for his chronic lung complaint, and Shelley had arranged to take Claire's daughter, Allegra, to her father Byron who was now in Venice. After travelling some months through France and Italy, Shelley left Mary and baby Clara at Bagni di Lucca (in today's Tuscany) while he travelled with Claire to Venice to see Byron and make arrangements for visiting Allegra. Byron invited the Shelleys to stay at his summer residence at Este, and Shelley urged Mary to meet him there. Clara became seriously ill on the journey and died on 24 September in Venice. Following Clara's death, Mary fell into a long period of depression and emotional estrangement from Shelley.

On 1 December, the Shelleys moved to Naples, where they stayed for three months. During this period, Shelley was ill, depressed and almost suicidal: a state of mind reflected in his poem "Stanzas written in Dejection – December 1818, Near Naples". While in Naples, Shelley registered the birth and baptism of a baby girl, Elena Adelaide Shelley (born 27 December), naming himself as the father and falsely naming Mary as the mother. The parentage of Elena has never been conclusively established. Biographers have variously speculated that she was adopted by Shelley to console Mary for the loss of Clara, that she was Shelley's child by Claire, that she was his child by his servant Elise Foggi, or that she was the child of a "mysterious lady" who had followed Shelley to the continent. Shelley registered the birth and baptism on 27 February 1819, and the household left Naples for Rome the following day, leaving Elena with carers. Elena was to die in a poor suburb of Naples on 9 June 1820.

In Rome, Shelley was in poor health, probably having developed nephritis and tuberculosis which later was in remission. Nevertheless, he made significant progress on three major works: Julian and Maddalo, Prometheus Unbound and The Cenci. Julian and Maddalo is an autobiographical poem which explores the relationship between Shelley and Byron and analyses Shelley's personal crises of 1818 and 1819. The poem was completed in the summer of 1819, but was not published in Shelley's lifetime. Prometheus Unbound is a long dramatic poem inspired by Aeschylus's retelling of the Prometheus myth. It was completed in late 1819 and published in 1820. The Cenci is a verse drama of rape, murder and incest based on the story of the Renaissance Count Cenci of Rome and his daughter Beatrice. Shelley completed the play in September and the first edition was published that year. It was to become one of his most popular works and the only one to have two authorised editions in his lifetime.

Make me thy lyre, even as the forest is:
What if my leaves are falling like its own!
The tumult of thy mighty harmonies

Will take from both a deep, autumnal tone,
Sweet though in sadness. Be thou, Spirit fierce,
My spirit! Be thou me, impetuous one!

Drive my dead thoughts over the universe
Like withered leaves to quicken a new birth!
And, by the incantation of this verse,

Scatter, as from unextinguished hearth
Ashes and sparks, my words among mankind!
Be through my lips to unawakened Earth

The trumpet of a prophecy! O Wind,
If Winter comes, can Spring be far behind?

— From "Ode to the West Wind", 1819

Shelley's three-year-old son William died in June 1819, probably of malaria. The new tragedy caused a further decline in Shelley's health and deepened Mary's depression. On 4 August, she wrote: "We have now lived five years together; and if all the events of the five years were blotted out, I might be happy". The Shelleys were now living in Livorno where, in September, Shelley heard of the Peterloo Massacre of peaceful protesters in Manchester. Within two weeks he had completed one of his most famous political poems, The Mask of Anarchy, and despatched it to Leigh Hunt for publication. Hunt, however, decided not to publish it for fear of prosecution for seditious libel. The poem was only officially published in 1832.

In October, the Shelleys moved to Florence, where Shelley read a scathing review of the Revolt of Islam (and its earlier version Laon and Cythna) in the conservative Quarterly Review. He was angered by the personal attack on him in the article, which he erroneously believed had been written by Southey. His bitterness over the review lasted for the rest of his life.

On 12 November, Mary gave birth to a boy, Percy Florence Shelley. Around the time of Percy's birth, the Shelleys met Sophia Stacey, who was a ward of one of Shelley's uncles and was staying at the same pension as the Shelleys. Sophia, a talented harpist and singer, formed a friendship with Shelley while Mary was preoccupied with her newborn son. Shelley wrote at least five love poems and fragments for Sophia including "Song written for an Indian Air".

The Shelleys moved to Pisa in January 1820, ostensibly to consult a doctor who had been recommended to them. There they became friends with the Irish republican Margaret Mason (Lady Margaret Mountcashell) and her lover George William Tighe. Mrs Mason became the inspiration for Shelley's poem "The Sensitive Plant", and Shelley's discussions with Mason and Tighe influenced his political thought and his critical interest in the population theories of Thomas Malthus.

In March, Shelley wrote to friends that Mary was depressed, suicidal and hostile towards him. Shelley was also beset by financial worries, as creditors from England pressed him for payment and he was obliged to make secret payments in connection with his "Neapolitan charge" Elena.

Meanwhile, Shelley was writing A Philosophical View of Reform, a political essay which he had begun in Rome. The unfinished essay, which remained unpublished in Shelley's lifetime, has been called "one of the most advanced and sophisticated documents of political philosophy in the nineteenth century".

Another crisis erupted in June when Shelley claimed that he had been assaulted in the Pisan post office by a man accusing him of foul crimes. Shelley's biographer James Bieri suggests that this incident was possibly a delusional episode brought on by extreme stress, as Shelley was being blackmailed by a former servant, Paolo Foggi, over baby Elena. It is likely that the blackmail was connected with a story spread by another former servant, Elise Foggi, that Shelley had fathered a child by Claire in Naples and had sent it to a foundling home. Shelley, Claire and Mary denied this story, and Elise later recanted.

In July, hearing that John Keats was seriously ill in England, Shelley wrote to the poet inviting him to stay with him at Pisa. Keats replied with hopes of seeing him, but instead, arrangements were made for Keats to travel to Rome. Following the death of Keats in 1821, Shelley wrote Adonais, which Harold Bloom considers one of the major pastoral elegies. The poem was published in Pisa in July 1821, but sold few copies.

In early July 1820, Shelley heard that baby Elena had died on 9 June. In the months following the post office incident and Elena's death, relations between Mary and Claire deteriorated and Claire spent most of the next two years living separately from the Shelleys, mainly in Florence.

That December, Shelley met Teresa (Emilia) Viviani, the 19-year-old daughter of the Governor of Pisa, who was living in a convent awaiting a suitable marriage. Shelley visited her several times over the next few months and they started a passionate correspondence, which dwindled after her marriage the following September. Emilia was the inspiration for Shelley's major poem Epipsychidion.

In March 1821, Shelley completed "A Defence of Poetry", a response to Peacock's article "The Four Ages of Poetry". Shelley's essay, with its famous conclusion "Poets are the unacknowledged legislators of the world", remained unpublished in his lifetime.

Shelley went alone to Ravenna in early August to see Byron, making a detour to Livorno for a rendezvous with Claire. Shelley stayed with Byron for two weeks and invited the older poet to spend the winter in Pisa. After Shelley had heard Byron recite his newly completed fifth canto of Don Juan he wrote to Mary: "I despair of rivalling Byron."

In November, Byron moved into Villa Lanfranchi in Pisa, just across the river from the Shelleys. Byron became the centre of the "Pisan circle", which was to include Shelley, Thomas Medwin, Edward Williams and Edward Trelawny.

In the early months of 1822, Shelley became increasingly close to Jane Williams, who was living with her partner Edward Williams in the same building as the Shelleys. Shelley wrote a number of love poems for Jane, including "The Serpent is shut out of Paradise" and "With a Guitar, to Jane". His obvious affection for Jane was to cause increasing tension among Shelley, Edward Williams and Mary.

Claire arrived in Pisa in April at Shelley's invitation, and soon afterwards they heard that her daughter Allegra had died of typhus in Ravenna. The Shelleys and Claire then moved to Villa Magni, near Lerici, on the shores of the Gulf of La Spezia. Shelley acted as mediator between Claire and Byron over arrangements for the burial of their daughter, and the added strain led to Shelley having a series of hallucinations.

Mary almost died from a miscarriage on 16 June, her life only being saved by Shelley's effective first aid. Two days later Shelley wrote to a friend that there was no sympathy between Mary and him and if the past and future could be obliterated he would be content in his boat with Jane and her guitar. That same day he also wrote to Trelawny asking for prussic acid. The following week, Shelley woke the household with his screaming over a nightmare or hallucination in which he saw Edward and Jane Williams as walking corpses and himself strangling Mary.

During this time, Shelley was writing his final major poem, the unfinished The Triumph of Life, which Harold Bloom has called "the most despairing poem he wrote".

=== Death ===
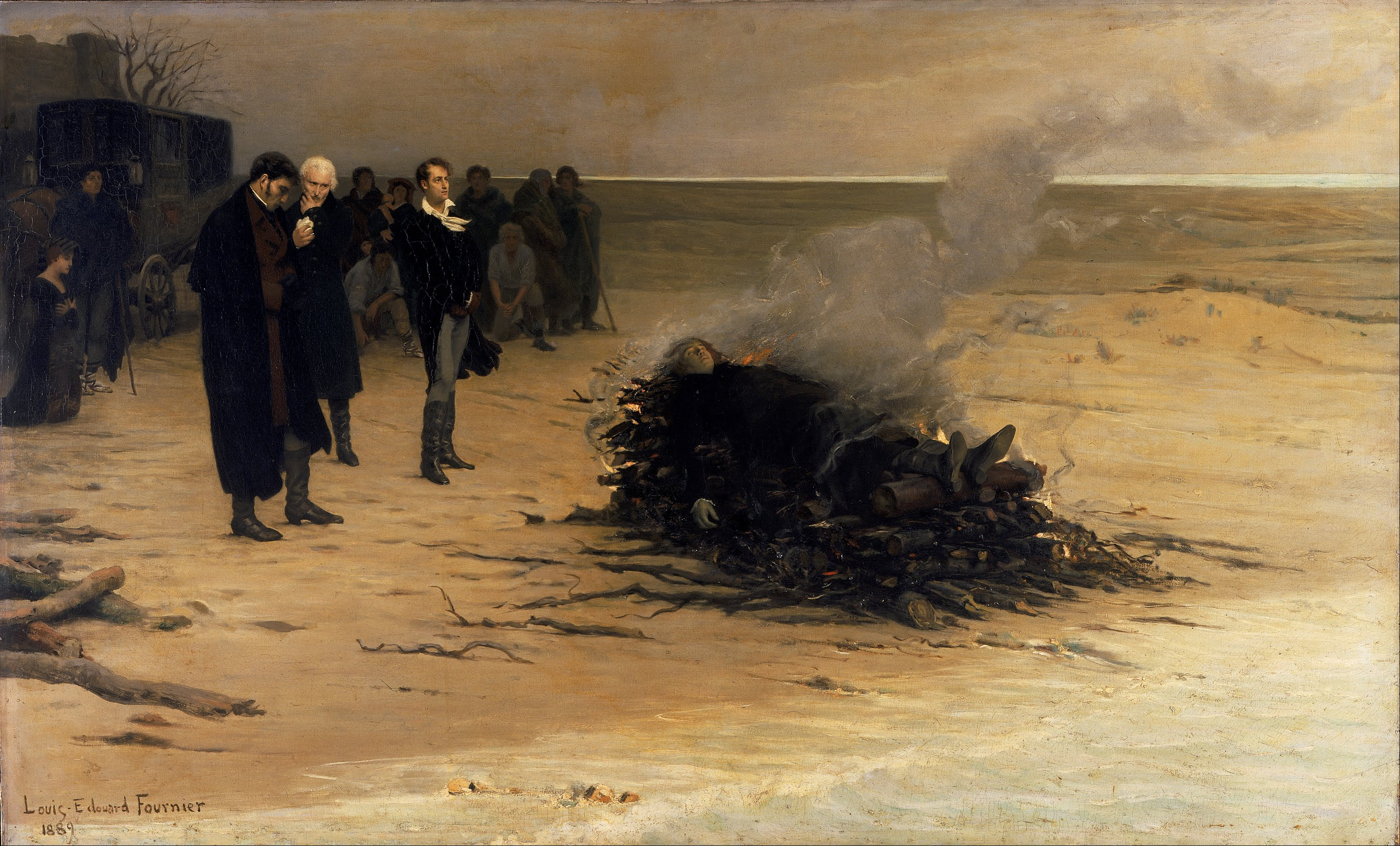
The Funeral of Shelley by Louis Édouard Fournier (1889). Pictured in the centre are, from left, Trelawny, Hunt, and Byron. In fact, Hunt did not observe the cremation, and Byron left early. Mary Shelley, who is pictured kneeling at left, did not attend the funeral.

On 1 July 1822, Shelley and Edward Williams sailed in Shelley's new boat the Don Juan to Livorno where Shelley met Leigh Hunt and Byron in order to make arrangements for a new journal, The Liberal. After the meeting, on 8 July, Shelley, Williams, and their boat boy sailed out of Livorno for Lerici. A few hours later, the Don Juan and its inexperienced crew were lost in a storm. The vessel, an open boat, had been custom-built in Genoa for Shelley. Mary Shelley declared in her "Note on Poems of 1822" (1839) that the design had a defect and that the boat was never seaworthy. The sinking, however, was probably due to the severe storm and poor seamanship of the three men on board.

Shelley's badly decomposed body washed ashore at Viareggio ten days later and was identified by Trelawny from the clothing and a copy of Keats's Lamia in a jacket pocket. On 16 August, his body was cremated on a beach near Viareggio and the ashes were buried in the Protestant Cemetery of Rome.

The day after the news of his death reached England, the Tory London newspaper The Courier printed: "Shelley, the writer of some infidel poetry, has been drowned; now he knows whether there is God or no." Shelley's ashes were reburied in a different plot at the cemetery in 1823. His grave bears the Latin inscription Cor Cordium (Heart of Hearts), and a few lines of "Ariel's Song" from Shakespeare's The Tempest:

Nothing of him that doth fade
But doth suffer a sea change
Into something rich and strange.

==== Shelley's remains ====
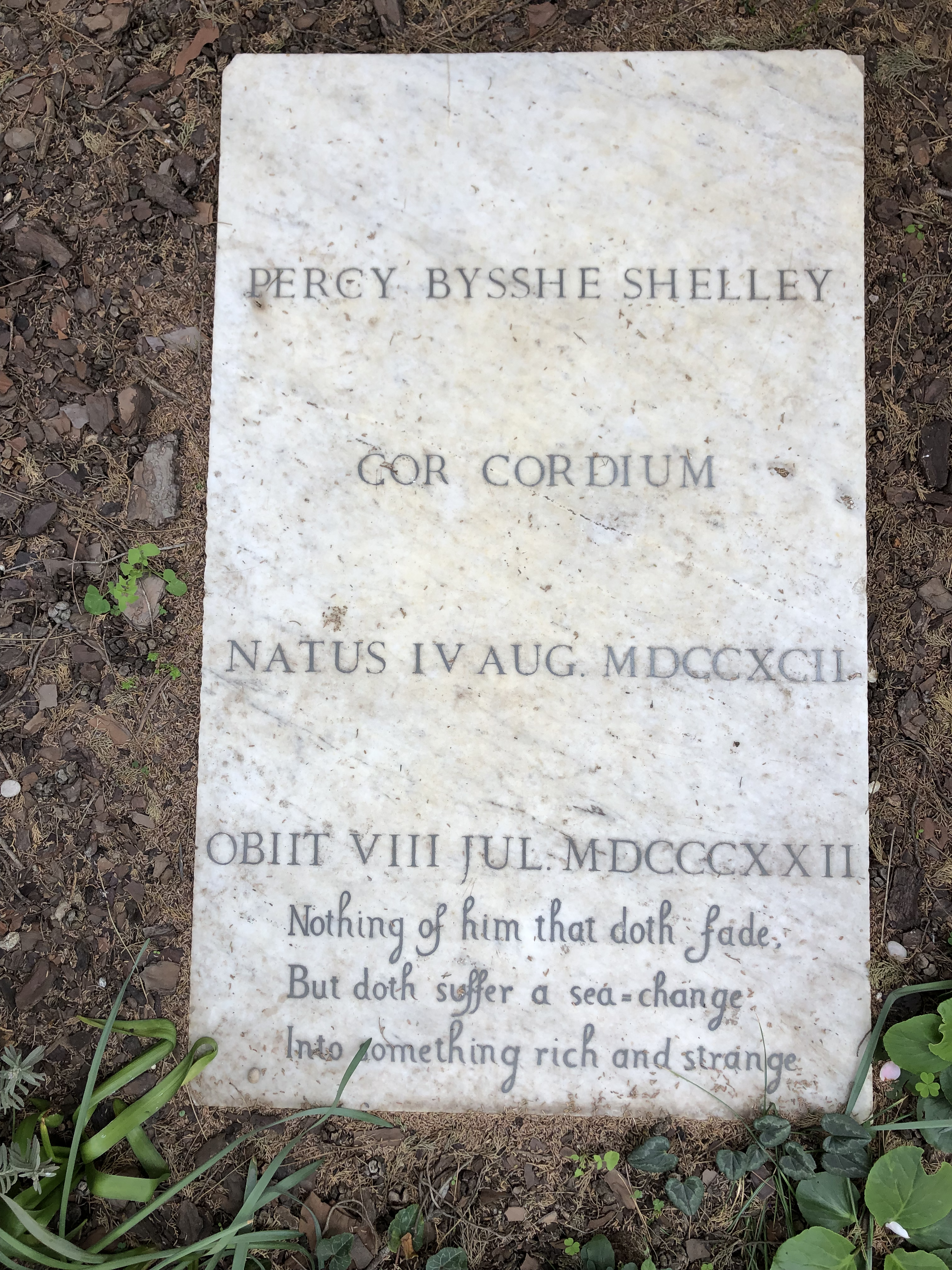
Shelley's gravestone in the Cimitero Acattolico in Rome; phrases from "Ariel's Song" in Shakespeare's The Tempest appear below

When Shelley's body was cremated on the beach, his presumed heart resisted burning and was retrieved by Trelawny. The heart was possibly calcified from an earlier tubercular infection, or was perhaps his liver. Trelawny gave the scorched organ to Hunt, who preserved it in spirits of wine and refused to hand it over to Mary. He finally relented and the heart was eventually buried either at St Peter's Church, Bournemouth, or in Christchurch Priory. Hunt also retrieved a piece of Shelley's jawbone which, in 1913, was given to the Shelley-Keats Memorial in Rome.

=== Family history ===
Shelley's paternal grandfather was Bysshe Shelley (21 June 1731 – 6 January 1815), who, in 1806, was created Sir Bysshe Shelley, 1st Baronet of Castle Goring. On Sir Bysshe's death in 1815, Shelley's father inherited the baronetcy, becoming Sir Timothy Shelley.

Shelley was the eldest of several legitimate children. Bieri argues that Shelley had an older illegitimate brother but, if he existed, little is known of him. His younger siblings were: Elizabeth (1794–1831), Hellen (1796–1796), Mary (1797–1884), Hellen (1799–1885), Margaret (1801–1887) and John (1806–1866).

Shelley had two children by his first wife Harriet: Eliza Ianthe Shelley (1813–1876) and Charles Bysshe Shelley (1814–1826). He had four children by his second wife Mary: an unnamed daughter born in 1815 who only survived ten days; William Shelley (1816–1819); Clara Everina Shelley (1817–1818); and Percy Florence Shelley (1819–1889). Shelley also declared himself to be the father of Elena Adelaide Shelley (1818–1820), who might have been an illegitimate or adopted daughter. His son Percy became the third baronet in 1844, following the death of Sir Timothy.

== Political, religious and ethical views ==
=== Politics ===
Shelley was a political radical influenced by thinkers such as Rousseau, Paine, Godwin, Wollstonecraft and Leigh Hunt. He advocated Catholic emancipation, republicanism, parliamentary reform, the extension of the franchise, freedom of speech and peaceful assembly, an end to aristocratic and clerical privilege, and a more equal distribution of income and wealth. The views he expressed in his published works were often more moderate than those he advocated privately because of the risk of prosecution for seditious libel and his desire not to alienate more moderate friends and political allies. Nevertheless, his political writings and activism brought him to the attention of the Home Office and he came under government surveillance at various periods.

Shelley's most influential political work in the years immediately following his death was the poem Queen Mab, which included extensive notes on political themes. The work went through 14 official and pirated editions by 1845, and became popular in Owenist and Chartist circles. His longest political essay, A Philosophical View of Reform, was written in 1820, but not published until 1920.

=== Nonviolence ===
Shelley's advocacy of nonviolent resistance was largely based on his reflections on the French Revolution and rise of Napoleon, and his belief that violent protest would increase the prospect of a military despotism. Although Shelley sympathised with supporters of Irish independence, such as Peter Finnerty and Robert Emmet, he did not support violent rebellion. In his early pamphlet An Address, to the Irish People (1812), he wrote: "I do not wish to see things changed now, because it cannot be done without violence, and we may assure ourselves that none of us are fit for any change, however good, if we condescend to employ force in a cause we think right."

In his later essay A Philosophical View of Reform, Shelley did concede that there were political circumstances in which force might be justified: "The last resort of resistance is undoubtably [sic] insurrection. The right of insurrection is derived from the employment of armed force to counteract the will of the nation." Shelley supported the 1820 armed rebellion against absolute monarchy in Spain, and the 1821 armed Greek uprising against Ottoman rule.

Shelley's poem "The Mask of Anarchy" (written in 1819, but first published in 1832) has been called "perhaps the first modern statement of the principle of nonviolent resistance". Gandhi was familiar with the poem and it is possible that Shelley had an indirect influence on Gandhi through Henry David Thoreau's Civil Disobedience.

=== Religion ===
Shelley was an avowed atheist, who was influenced by the materialist arguments in Holbach's Le Système de la nature. His atheism was an important element of his political radicalism as he saw organised religion as inextricably linked to social oppression. The overt and implied atheism in many of his works raised a serious risk of prosecution for religious libel. His early pamphlet The Necessity of Atheism was withdrawn from sale soon after publication following a complaint from a priest. His poem Queen Mab, which includes sustained attacks on the priesthood, Christianity and religion in general, was twice prosecuted by the Society for the Suppression of Vice in 1821. A number of his other works were edited before publication to reduce the risk of prosecution.

=== Free love ===
Shelley's advocacy of free love drew heavily on the work of Mary Wollstonecraft, William Godwin and James Henry Lawrence. In his notes to Queen Mab, he wrote: "A system could not well have been devised more studiously hostile to human happiness than marriage." He argued that the children of unhappy marriages "are nursed in a systematic school of ill-humour, violence and falsehood". He believed that the ideal of chastity outside marriage was "a monkish and evangelical superstition" which led to the hypocrisy of prostitution and promiscuity.

Shelley believed that "sexual connection" should be free among those who loved each other and last only as long as their mutual love. Love should also be free and not subject to obedience, jealousy and fear. He denied that free love would lead to promiscuity and the disruption of stable human relationships, arguing that relationships based on love would generally be of long duration and marked by generosity and self-devotion.

When Shelley's friend T. J. Hogg made an unwanted sexual advance to Shelley's first wife Harriet, Shelley forgave him of his "horrible error" and assured him that he was not jealous. It is very likely that Shelley encouraged Hogg and Shelley's second wife Mary to have a sexual relationship.

=== Vegetarianism ===
Shelley converted to a vegetable diet in early March 1812 and sustained it, with occasional lapses, for the remainder of his life. His vegetarianism was influenced by ancient authors such as Hesiod, Pythagoras, Socrates, Plato, Ovid and Plutarch, but more directly by John Frank Newton, author of The Return to Nature, or, A Defence of the Vegetable Regimen (1811). Shelley wrote two essays on vegetarianism: A Vindication of Natural Diet (1813) and "On the Vegetable System of Diet" (written c. 1813–1815, but first published in 1929). Michael Owen Jones argues that Shelley's advocacy of vegetarianism was strikingly modern, emphasising its health benefits, the alleviation of animal suffering, the inefficient use of agricultural land involved in animal husbandry, and the economic inequality resulting from the commercialisation of animal food production. Shelley's life and works inspired the founding of the Vegetarian Society in England in 1847 and directly influenced the vegetarianism of George Bernard Shaw.

== Reception and influence ==
Shelley's work was not widely read in his lifetime outside a small circle of friends, poets and critics. Most of his poetry, drama and fiction was published in editions of 250 copies which generally sold poorly. Only The Cenci went to an authorised second edition while Shelley was alive – in contrast, Byron's The Corsair (1814) sold out its first edition of 10,000 copies in one day.

The initial reception of Shelley's work in mainstream periodicals (with the exception of the liberal Examiner) was generally unfavourable. Reviewers often launched personal attacks on Shelley's private life and political, social and religious views, even when conceding that his poetry contained beautiful imagery and poetic expression. There was also criticism of Shelley's intelligibility and style, Hazlitt describing it as "a passionate dream, a straining after impossibilities, a record of fond conjectures, a confused embodying of vague abstraction".

Shelley's poetry soon gained a wider audience in radical and reformist circles. Queen Mab became popular with Owenists and Chartists, and Revolt of Islam influenced poets sympathetic to the workers' movement such as Thomas Hood, Thomas Cooper and William Morris.

However, Shelley's mainstream following did not develop until a generation after his death. Bieri argues that editions of Shelley's poems published in 1824 and 1839 were edited by Mary Shelley to highlight her late husband's lyrical gifts and downplay his radical ideas. Matthew Arnold famously described Shelley as a "beautiful and ineffectual angel".

Shelley was a major influence on a number of important poets in the following decades, including Robert Browning, Algernon Swinburne, Thomas Hardy and William Butler Yeats. Shelley-like characters frequently appeared in nineteenth-century literature; they include Scythrop in Thomas Love Peacock's Nightmare Abbey, Ladislaw in George Eliot's Middlemarch and Angel Clare in Hardy's Tess of the d'Urbervilles.

Twentieth-century critics such as Eliot, Leavis, Allen Tate and Auden variously criticised Shelley's poetry for deficiencies in style, "repellent" ideas, and immaturity of intellect and sensibility. However, Shelley's critical reputation began to rise in the 1960s as a new generation of critics highlighted Shelley's debt to Spenser and Milton, his mastery of genres and verse forms, and the complex interplay of sceptical, idealist, and materialist ideas in his work. According to Donald H. Reiman, "Shelley belongs to the great tradition of Western writers that includes Dante, Shakespeare and Milton."

== Legacy ==
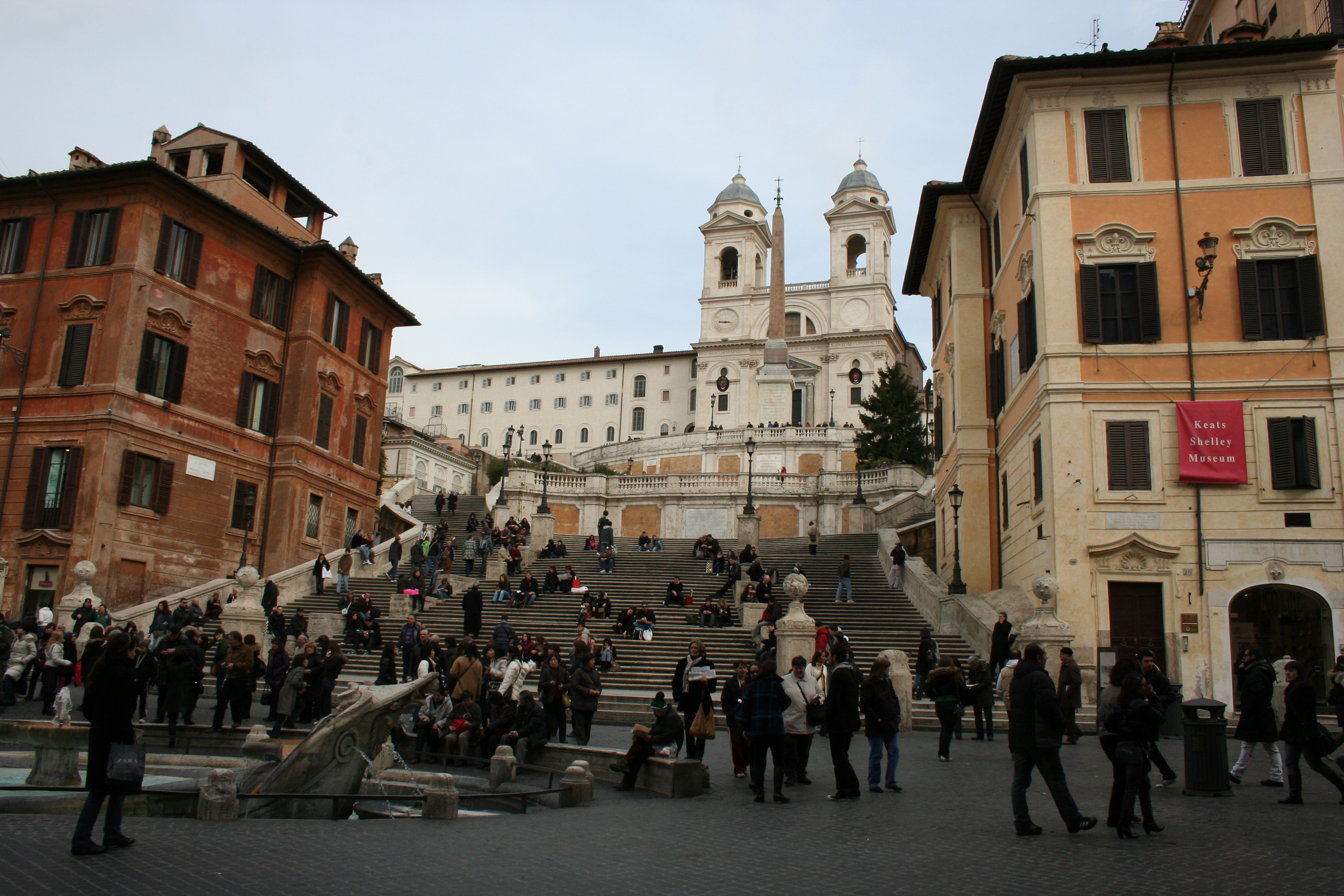
Keats–Shelley Memorial House, at right with a red sign, by the Spanish Steps in Rome

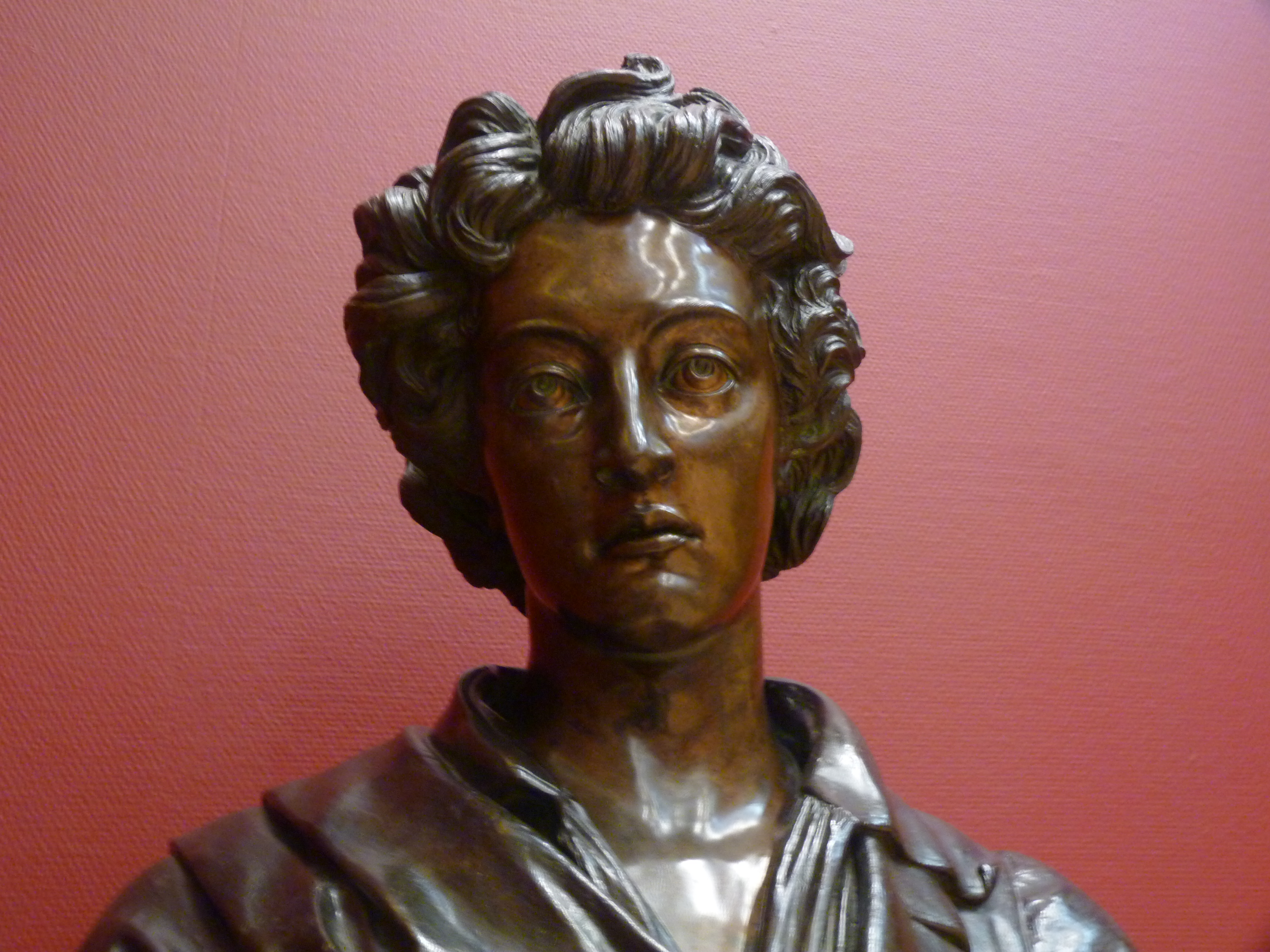
Bronze statue of Shelley by Amelia Robertson Hill, 1882, on display at Tate Britain (idealised only)

At the time of Shelley's death, many of his works had been left unfinished, unpublished or published in expurgated versions with multiple errors. Since the 1980s, a number of projects have aimed at establishing reliable editions of his manuscripts and works. Among the most notable of these are:

- Reiman, D. H. (general ed.), The Bodleian Shelley Manuscripts (23 vols.), New York (1986–2002)
- Reiman, D. H. (general ed.), The Manuscripts of the Younger Romantics: Shelley (9 vols., 1985–97)
- Reiman, D. H., and Fraistat, N. (et al.) The Complete Poetry of Percy Bysshe Shelley (3 vols.), 1999–2012, Baltimore, Johns Hopkins University Press
- Cameron, K. N., and Reiman, D. H. (eds), Shelley and his Circle 1773–1822, Cambridge, Mass., 1961– (8 vols.)
- Everest K., Matthews, G., et al. (eds), The Poems of Shelley, 1804–1821 (4 vols.), Longman, 1989–2014
- Murray, E. B. (ed.), The Prose Works of Percy Bysshe Shelley, Vol. 1, 1811–1818, Oxford University Press, 1995

Shelley's long-lost "Poetical Essay on the Existing State of Things" (1811) was rediscovered in 2006 and subsequently made available online by the Bodleian Library in Oxford.

Charles E. Robinson has argued that Shelley's contribution to Mary Shelley's novel Frankenstein was very significant and that Shelley should be considered her collaborator in writing the novel. Charlotte Gordon and others have disputed this contention. Fiona Sampson has said: "In recent years Percy's corrections, visible in the Frankenstein notebooks held at the Bodleian Library in Oxford, have been seized on as evidence that he must have at least co-authored the novel. In fact, when I examined the notebooks myself, I realised that Percy did rather less than any line editor working in publishing today."

=== Organisations ===
The Shelley Society was founded in London in 1885 by Frederick James Furnivall, and branches were later formed in provincial Britain and abroad, including in Australia, New Zealand, and the United States. Its lectures, publications, and publicity helped popularise Shelley and shaped contemporary discussions about the place of English literature in scholarly study. The society ceased regular operations in the early 20th century.

The Keats–Shelley Memorial Association, founded in 1903, supports the Keats–Shelley Memorial House in Rome which is a museum and library dedicated to the Romantic writers with a strong connection with Italy. The association is also responsible for maintaining the grave of Percy Bysshe Shelley in the non-Catholic Cemetery at Testaccio. The association publishes the scholarly Keats–Shelley Review. It also runs the annual Keats–Shelley and Young Romantics Writing Prizes and the Keats–Shelley Fellowship.

== Selected works ==
Works are listed by estimated year of composition. The year of first publication is given when this is different. Source is Bieri, unless otherwise indicated.

=== Poetry ===
- Original Poetry by Victor and Cazire (1810, collaboration with Elizabeth Shelley)
- Posthumous Fragments of Margaret Nicholson (1810, collaboration with Thomas Jefferson Hogg)
- The Devil's Walk (1812)
- Queen Mab (1813)
- Alastor, or The Spirit of Solitude (1815, published 1816)
- Mont Blanc (1816, published 1817)
- Mutability (1816)
- Hymn to Intellectual Beauty (1817)
- The Revolt of Islam (1817, published 1818)
- Ozymandias (1818)
- Rosalind and Helen (1818, published 1819)
- Lines Written Among the Euganean Hills (1818, published 1819)
- Song to the Men of England (1819, published 1839)
- England in 1819 (1819, published 1839)
- Love's Philosophy (1819)
- Ode to the West Wind (1819, published 1820)
- The Mask of Anarchy (1819, published 1832)
- Julian and Maddalo (1819, published 1824)
- Peter Bell the Third (1819, published 1839)
- Letter to Maria Gisborne (1820, published 1824)
- To a Skylark (1820)
- The Cloud (1820)
- The Sensitive Plant (1820)
- The Witch of Atlas (1820, published 1824)
- Adonais (1821)
- Epipsychidion (1821)
- Music, When Soft Voices Die (1821, published 1824)
- One Word is Too Often Profaned (1822, published 1824)
- A Dirge (1822, published 1824)
- The Triumph of Life (1822, unfinished, published 1824)
- Posthumous Poems (1824)

=== Drama ===
- The Cenci (1819)
- Prometheus Unbound (1820)
- Oedipus Tyrannus; or, Swellfoot the Tyrant (1820)
- Hellas (1822)
- Charles the First (1822, unfinished, published 1824)
- Fragments from an Unfinished Drama (1822, published 1824)

=== Fiction ===
- Zastrozzi (1810)
- St. Irvyne; or, The Rosicrucian (1810, published 1811)

=== Short prose works ===
- "The Assassins, A Fragment of a Romance" (1814)
- "The Coliseum, A Fragment" (1817)
- "Una Favola (A Fable)" (1819, originally in Italian)

=== Essays ===
- The Necessity of Atheism (with Thomas Jefferson Hogg) (1811)
- Poetical Essay on the Existing State of Things (1811)
- An Address, to the Irish People (1812)
- Proposals for an Association of Philanthropists (1812)
- Declaration of Rights (1812)
- A Letter to Lord Ellenborough (1812)
- A Vindication of Natural Diet (1813)
- A Refutation of Deism (1814)
- Speculations on Metaphysics (1814)
- On the Vegetable System of Diet (1814–1815, published 1929)
- On a Future State (1815)
- On The Punishment of Death (1815)
- A Proposal for Putting Reform to the Vote Throughout the Kingdom (1817)
- Speculations on Morals (1817)
- On Christianity (1817, unfinished, published 1859)
- On Love (1818)
- On the Literature, the Arts and the Manners of the Athenians (1818)
- On The Symposium, or Preface to The Banquet of Plato (1818)
- On Frankenstein (1818, published 1832)
- On Life (1819)
- A Philosophical View of Reform (1819–20, published 1920)
- A Defence of Poetry (1821, published 1840)

=== Chapbooks ===
- Wolfstein; or, The Mysterious Bandit (1822)
- Wolfstein, the Murderer; or, The Secrets of a Robber's Cave (1850)

=== Translations ===
- Prometheus Bound, translated by Percy Bysshe Shelley and Thomas Medwin (1832)
- The Banquet of Plato (1818, first published in unbowdlerised form 1931)
- Ion of Plato (1821)

=== Collaborations with Mary Shelley ===
- History of a Six Weeks' Tour (1817)
- Proserpine (1820)
- Midas (1820)

== See also ==
- List of peace activists
- List of vegetarians
- Godwin–Shelley family tree
- Rising Universe – A 1996 water sculpture celebrating the life of Shelley in Horsham, West Sussex, near his birthplace; largely removed in 2016
