= Hellas (poem) =

Verse drama by Percy Bysshe Shelley

Hellas. A Lyrical Drama. By Percy B. Shelley. London (1822)

Hellas is a lyrical drama by Percy Bysshe Shelley, written in 1821 and published in 1822 by Charles and James Ollier in London. Shelley wrote it while living in Pisa, with a view to raising money for the Greek War of Independence. It was his last published poem during his lifetime.

Shelley argued that European law, religion, art, and culture had their origins in ancient Greece, so the fight for Greek liberty was also a fight to defend the foundations of Western civilization. He wrote: "We are all Greeks."

== Dedication ==
The dedication of the drama was: TO HIS EXCELLENCY PRINCE ALEXANDER MAVROCORDATO LATE SECRETARY FOR FOREIGN AFFAIRS TO THE HOSPODAR OF WALLACHIA, THE DRAMA OF HELLAS IS INSCRIBED AS AN IMPERFECT TOKEN OF THE ADMIRATION, SYMPATHY, AND FRIENDSHIP OF THE AUTHOR.. Pisa, November 1, 1821.

The Greek politician Alexandros Mavrokordatos met Shelley during his stay in Pisa from 1818 to 1821.

== Analysis ==
The drama is written from the point of view of the Ottoman Sultan, and was inspired by Aeschylus' Persae.

The drama focuses on the Sultan, Mahmud, who controls the Turkish attacks on Greece. His sleep is restless and his mind worried by a recurring nightmare. He seeks help from the Wandering Jew, Ahasuerus, whom he believes has magic powers and can interpret his dream. During their conversation, Mahmud sinks more and more into despair as he, in spite of reports of Turkish victories, realizes that he has lost the war.

Alternating between the three dialogue parts is a chorus of enslaved Greek women, who furnish the drama with hope and aspirations for freedom's victory. Their participation is not directly connected to the insurrection of Greece, but rather expresses a universalized view of the futility of war.

The action is seen from the Turkish point of view, which makes it possible for Shelley to focus both on Turkish defeat, via Mahmud, and Greek victory, through the chorus.

The last chorus from the drama contains the much-quoted stanzas:

The world's great age begins anew,

The golden years return,

The earth doth like a snake renew

Her winter weeds outworn:

Heaven smiles, and faiths and empires gleam,
Like wrecks of a dissolving dream.

...

Oh, cease! must hate and death return?

Cease! must men kill and die?

Cease! drain not to its dregs the urn

Of bitter prophecy.

The world is weary of the past,
Oh, might it die or rest at last!

== Sources ==
- McGann, Jerome J. "The Secrets of an Elder Day: Shelley after 'Hellas'." Keats-Shelley Journal, Vol. 15, (Winter, 1966), pp. 25–41.
- McGrath, Brian. "Impassivities: From Paradise Lost to Hellas." Comparative Literature 72.2 (2020): 114-127.
- Løkse, Mariann. In Defence of Hellas: An Analysis of Shelley's Hellas and Its Reception' Tromsø, Norway, 1994.
- Reiman, Donald H., and Michael J. Neth, eds. The Hellas Notebook: Vol.16: Bodleian Ms. Shelley Adds. e. 7 : Including False Starts and Canceled Passages for Hellas, Shelley's Research Notes for "Charles the First," and drafts for several lyrics . Garland, 1994.
- Rossington, Michael. "The Publication of Hellas." Romanticism 30.1 (2024): 81-92.
- King-Hele, Desmond. "Hellas." Shelley: His Thought and Work. London: Palgrave Macmillan UK, 1984. 315-339.
- Kipperman, Mark. "History and Ideality: The Politics of Shelley's 'Hellas'." Studies in Romanticism, Vol. 30, No. 2 (Summer, 1991), pp. 147–168.
- Kipperman, Mark. "Macropolitics of Utopia: Shelley's 'Hellas'." Macropolitics of Nineteenth-Century Literature: Nationalism, Exoticism, Imperialism 3 (1991): 86.
- Ulmer, William A. "'Hellas' and the Historical Uncanny." ELH, Vol. 58, No. 3 (Autumn, 1991), pp. 611–632.
- Duffy, Cian. "Percy Bysshe Shelley's other lyrical drama and the inception of Hellas." SEL Studies in English Literature 1500-1900 55.4 (2015): 817-840.
- Quayle, Jonathan. "Directing the ‘Unfinished Scene’: Utopia and the Role of the Poet in Shelley's 'Hellas'." Romanticism 26.3 (2020): 280-291.
- Erkelenz, Michael. "Inspecting the tragedy of empire: Shelley's 'Hellas' and Aeschylus' 'Persians'." Philological Quarterly, Vol. 76, 1997.
- Flagg, John Sewell. Prometheus Unbound and Hellas: An Approach to Shelley's Lyrical Dramas. Institut fur Englische Sprache und Literatur, Universiteat, Salzburg, Austria, 1972.
- Findlay, L. M. "‘We are all Greeks’: Shelley's Hellas and romantic nationalism." History of European Ideas 16.1-3 (1993): 281-286.
- Chaudhary, Mukhtar. "Shelley's Pickings in 'The Triumph of Life' and 'Hellas'." Umm Al-Qura University Journal for Languages & Literature, January, 2009.
- Havens, Raymond, D. "'Hellas' and 'Charles the First'." Studies in Philology, Vol. 43, No. 3 (July, 1946), pp. 545–550.
- Hoagwood, Terence Allan. "Shelley, Milton, and the Poetics of Ideological Transformation: Paradise Lost and the Prologue to Hellas." Nineteenth Century Contexts 10.2 (1986): 25-48.
- Klausing, Kyle J. "'We Are All Greeks:' Sympathy and Proximity in Shelley‘s Hellas." Scholarly Horizons: University of Minnesota, Morris Undergraduate Journal 2.2 (2015): 3.
- Kooy, Dana Van. "Improvising on the Borders: Hellenism, History, and Tragedy in Shelley's 'Hellas'" in Transnational England: home and abroad, 1780-1860, edited by Monika Class and Terry F. Robinson. Newcastle : Cambridge Scholars, 2009.
- O’Neill, Michael. "‘Wrecks of a Dissolving Dream’: Shelley's Art of Ambivalence in Hellas." The Neglected Shelley. Routledge, 2016. 239-260.
- Nabugodi, Mathelinda. "Old Anew: 'Hellas'." European Romantic Review 33.5 (2022): 639-652.
- Crampton, Daniel Nicholas. "Shelley's Political Optimism: 'The Mask of Anarchy' to Hellas." Ph.D. dissertation, University of Wisconsin-Madison, 1973.
- White, Newman Ivey. "The Historical and Personal Background of Shelley’s Hellas." South Atlantic Quarterly 20.1 (1921): 52-60.
- Wilson, M. "Pavilioned upon Chaos: the Problem of Hellas." Shelley: Modern Judgements. London: Macmillan Education UK, 1968. 228-240.
- YoNETA, Lawrence Masakazu. "Anxiety about the Spirit of the Age: Shelley's Hellas and the Greek War of Independence." Essays in English Romanticism 35 (2011): 31-46.
