= On Frankenstein =

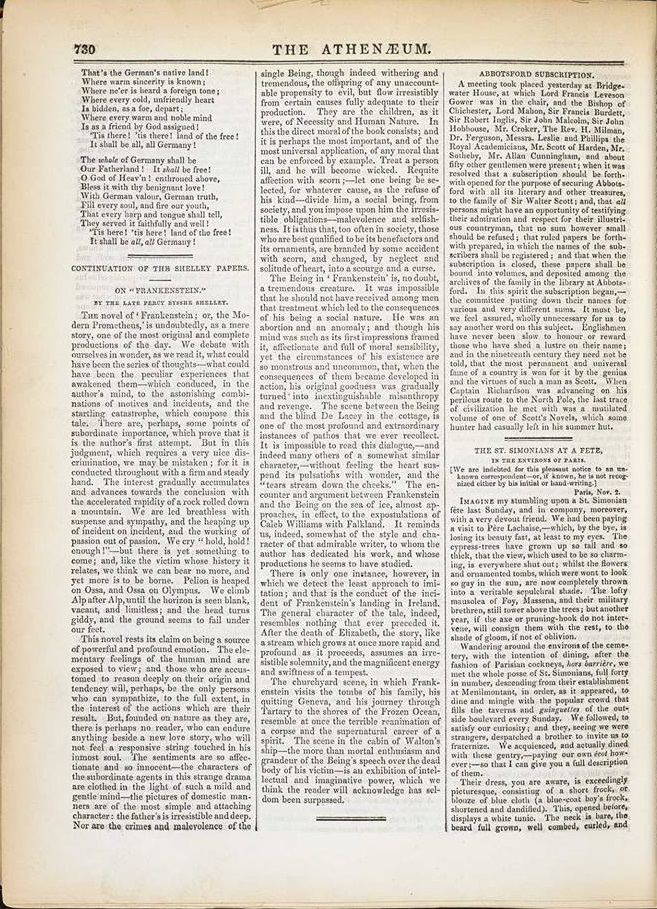
"On Frankenstein" in The Athenaeum, London, November 10, 1832.

"On Frankenstein" is a review of Mary Shelley's 1818 novel Frankenstein; or, The Modern Prometheus that was written by her husband, Percy Bysshe Shelley, in 1817 but not published until 1832.

== Background ==
The review was written by Percy Bysshe Shelley in 1817 to help promote the novel and to counter expected negative reviews. It remained unpublished, however, until after the third edition of Frankenstein appeared in 1831. Percy Bysshe Shelley's cousin Thomas Medwin submitted it to the British literary magazine The Athenaeum for the Saturday, November 10, 1832 issue on page 730. It was part of the series "The Shelley Papers" which appeared in The Athenaeum starting in September, 1832.

In his biography Life of Shelley, Medwin had written that he sought to have the review published to demonstrate that, contrary to claims, Shelley did not write the novel and did not have any role in its creation: "I have heard it asserted that the idea [of Frankenstein] was [Percy Bysshe] Shelley's, and that he assisted much in the development of the plot." Notwithstanding Medwin's own claims, the drafts and proofs of the novel showed that this statement was accurate. Shelley had come up with the idea for the novel, as Mary herself acknowledged in the 1831 Introduction, and he had, at the very least, made substantial contributions to the writing of the novel. Mary had not, however, included the review in her compilations and publications of Shelley's prose works. John Lauritsen in The Man Who Wrote Frankenstein argued that Mary suppressed the review because she feared it would expose Shelley as the true author of the novel.

The review was republished in Thomas Medwin's Memoir of Percy Bysshe Shelley; and Original Poems and Papers by Percy Bysshe Shelley: Now First Collected in 1833. The review also appeared in The Prose Works of Percy Bysshe Shelley edited by E. B. Murray in 1993.

The review was republished in The Man Who Wrote Frankenstein in 2007 and The Original Frankenstein edited by Charles E. Robinson in 2008.

== Summary ==
Shelley wrote that the dialogues between the Being and De Lacey were the most powerful and moving in the novel. He wrote that the central moral of the novel is intolerance, describing innocent victims of prejudice in society, "who are best qualified to be its benefactors and its ornaments." Shelley argued that the Being was a product of a xenophobic society: "Treat a person ill, and he will become wicked."

Shelley referred to the monster as the "Being" five times in his review. He also referred to the anonymous author using a masculine pronoun, "he".

The British Library analysis noted the direct connection to Shelley's poem "Mont Blanc" which was published in 1817 in History of a Six Weeks' Tour. Frankenstein develops the theme of "necessity" which Shelley wrote about in that poem. It is a philosophical idea of the novel.

The review related Frankenstein to Percy Bysshe Shelley's own works:

"The environment is an aspect Shelley also emphasises in his preface to the 1818 edition. He examines the way the monster turns against the world as a direct result of his treatment. For Shelley this is an example of the philosophical idea he defined as necessity, 'an immense and uninterrupted chain of causes and effects', which is explored in 'Mont Blanc' and is 'the direct moral' of Frankenstein. He points out that the monster’s mind is formed by impressions, and thus a conflict is created between Frankenstein monster’s good intentions (moments at which he is 'affectionate and full of moral sensibility') and the reactions of those around him to his 'tremendous' (frightening) appearance."

Shelley concluded that the novel was "one of the most original and complete productions of the age."

== Sources ==
- Grande, James. "The Original Frankenstein, By Mary Shelley with Percy Shelley ed Charles E Robinson. To what extent did Percy Bysshe Shelley work on 'Frankenstein'? A new analysis reveals all." 16 November, 2008, The Independent. Retrieved 30 September, 2018.
- Lauritsen, John. The Man Who Wrote Frankenstein. Dorchester, MA: Pagan Press, 2007.
- Medwin, Thomas. Memoir of Percy Bysshe Shelley; and Original Poems and Papers by Percy Bysshe Shelley: Now First Collected. London: Whittaker, Treacher, & Co., 1833, pp. 165-70.
- Robinson, Charles E., ed. The Original Frankenstein by Mary Wollstonecraft Shelley (with Percy Bysshe Shelley). New York: Vintage Books, 2008, pp. 434-36.
- Robinson, Charles E. "Percy Bysshe Shelley's Text(s) in Mary Wollstonecraft Shelley's Frankenstein", in The Neglected Shelley edited by Alan M. Weinberg and Timothy Webb. London and New York: Routledge, 2015, pp. 117-136.
- Shelley, Percy Bysshe. "On Frankenstein." The Athenaeum: Journal of English and Foreign Literature, Science, and the Fine Arts, Saturday, November 10, 1832. No. 263, page 730.
