= Proposals for an Association of Philanthropists =

Political pamphlet by Percy Shelley

- The 1812 first edition title page of Proposals for an Association of Philanthropists, Dublin, Ireland.
- Author: Percy Bysshe Shelley
- Language: English
- Published: 1812
- Publisher: Self-published
- Publication place: Ireland
- Pages: 18

"Proposals for an Association of Philanthropists" is a political pamphlet written by Romantic poet Percy Bysshe Shelley in 1812 during his active engagement in Irish politics during his stay in Dublin. It called for the creation of an organized, peaceful, non-violent association to fight for specific political reforms and broader social change in Ireland.

It was self-published by the author, printed by I. Eton in Dublin at Winetavern-Street. It followed his earlier pamphlet An Address, to the Irish People. He also self-published a broadside entitled Declaration of Rights after the previous two pamphlets.

It had as its goal Catholic Emancipation and the repeal of the Acts of Union 1800 with Great Britain.

The full title was: Proposals for An Association of those Philanthropists, Who, Convinced of the Inadequacy of the Moral and Political State of Ireland to Produce Benefits which Are Nevertheless Attainable, Are Willing to Unite to Accomplish Its Regeneration.

== Background ==
Shelley intended the Irish associations to be an organized coalition of reformers who would systematically fight "whatever moral or political evil, it may be within the compass of human power to assuage or eradicate".

The objective was to establish an organization of "philanthropists" to advance political change in Ireland through non-violent, intellectual, and moral means.

The association was designed to unite people to "accomplish [Ireland's] regeneration" and improve its inadequate moral and political state.

It was an early articulation of Shelley's commitment to peaceful, non-violent resistance. It advocated the creation of non-violent and self-sustaining organizations to advance ideas and not armed rebellion. Shelley advocated peaceful, nonviolent resistance.

He redefined the meaning of philanthropy. In Shelley's time, "philanthropy" was a highly charged, radical word derived from the ancient Greek for "love of humanity". Shelley used it to refer to political reformers and revolutionaries and "philanthropists" as literally "lovers of humanity" who wanted to reform and restructure society as opposed to wealthy people donating to charities. Shelley believed that organizing small, intimate groups would allow people to cooperate for the common good without the need for coercive government laws.

The associations would foster moral and political regeneration. The associations would thereby eradicate poverty, religious intolerance, and political corruption at their roots rather than simply treating their symptoms. It argues for the creation of a nonviolent political society to fight for Irish independence and address the systemic poverty and disenfranchisement of the Irish working class.

The proposals were not implemented at the time and were unsuccessful. William Godwin criticized them as inciting violence and bloodshed.

Godwin also rejected the views presented in An Address, to the Irish People. He was even more opposed to the measures in Proposals for an Association of Philanthropists.

He rebuked Shelley in a letter dated 18 March 1812:

“Shelley, you are preparing a scene of blood! If your associations take effect ... tremendous consequences will follow, and hundreds, by their calamities and premature fate, will expiate your error.”

He replied to Godwin, “I have withdrawn from circulation the publications wherein I erred & am preparing to leave Dublin.”

In the pamphlet, he enunciated his conceptions of peaceful, nonviolent resistance and goals for political reform. He would fully develop them in 1819 in The Masque of Anarchy, "Song to the Men of England", and "England in 1819".

== Publication history ==
Percy Bysshe Shelley's Proposal for an Association of Philanthropists was written and self-published in Dublin in 1812, intended to organize reformers and raise funds to combat political oppression in Ireland.

Shelley traveled to Dublin in early 1812 to support Catholic Emancipation and the repeal of the Act of Union. While there, he published three political tracts: An Address, to the Irish People, Proposals for an Association of Philanthropists, and a Declaration of Rights.

It was printed by I. Eton in Dublin at Winetavern-Street as an 18-page octavo, or 8vo, pamphlet following An Address, to the Irish People.

He had the works printed on low-cost paper and distributed them himself on the streets of Dublin to workers.

The work was reprinted by Harry Buxton Forman in the first volume of The Prose Works of Percy Bysshe Shelley published in 1880 in London by Reeves and Turner.

The pamphlet was republished in the 1906 two-volume compilation The Prose Works of Percy Bysshe Shelley edited by Richard Herne Shepherd.

The work was also included in Shelley's Prose; or, The Trumpet of a Prophecy compiled and edited by David Lee Clark in 1954.

== Summary ==
Shelley explained that his objectives were Catholic Emancipation, the repeal of the Act of Union, and through education, to eradicate moral and political vices:

"I propose, an association which shall have for its immediate objects, Catholic Emancipation, and the Repeal of the Act of Union between Great Britain and Ireland; and grounding on the removal of these grievances, an annihilation or palliation, of whatever moral or political evil, it may be within the compass of human power to assuage or eradicate."

The Proposals are Shelley's earliest public statement of the way in which love and politics should be inseparable: “Love for humankind” should “place individuals at distance from self,” thereby promoting “universal feeling.”

His goal was to eventually attain values that were universal, by an appeal to "those which excite the benevolent passions, that generalize and expand private into public feelings, and make the hearts of individuals vibrate not merely for themselves, their families, and their friends, but for posterity, for a people; till their country becomes the world."

William Godwin voiced his objections in letters to Shelley. He feared that reform organizations might develop into Jacobin societies that could result in violence such as occurred in the French Terror following the French Revolution. Shelley believed that the Irish would not attain any degree of freedom without unity and organization and education. He feared that Shelley's proposed methods and strategy might lead to violence and bloodshed, writing to Shelley that "you are preparing a scene of blood!".

The two immediate goals of the association were achieving Catholic Emancipation and the Repeal of the Act of Union between Great Britain and Ireland.

The long-term objective for Shelley was that he intended the association to "annihilate or palliate" moral and political evils within human power to fix or address.

Non-violent activism was always paramount. Shelley emphasized peaceful, organized, and moral social reform, explicitly rejecting violence, secret plots, and mobs: "A good cause may be shown to be good, violence instantly renders bad what might before have been good. 'Weapons that falsehood can use are unfit for the hands of truth'".

The focus was on intellectual association. The proposals reflected Shelley's view that political change should stem from "philanthropists", a dedicated group of thinkers working to expand private benevolence into public concern and focus. This pamphlet was part of a series of political efforts by Shelley while in Dublin to promote political awareness and change, closely related to his other work, An Address to the Irish People.

Shelley presented his arguments for reform in Ireland in three publications in 1812: An Address, to the Irish People, the Proposals for an Association of Philanthropists, and in a Declaration of Rights, a broadside which he distributed with the help of his servant Daniel Healey, who was arrested for distributing a broadside without a printer's name on it and due to its seditious and subversive nature.

After the three publications were printed and distributed, Shelley and his wife Harriet Westbrook, along with her sister Eliza, left Ireland, settling in the Elan Valley or Cwm Elan, in Wales. Here, Shelley continued to write political pamphlets and tracts. He would return to political activism in 1819 after the Peterloo Massacre.

== Influence ==
While unsuccessful at the time, the experience deeply influenced Shelley's future political activities and writings on reform and was crucial and pivotal in the evolution and development of his views on peaceful, non-violent protest which had a major influence on the policy of civil disobedience.

His 1812 political pamphlets on Ireland, "An Address, to the Irish People", Proposals for an Association of Philanthropists (1812), and Declaration of Rights (1812) would influence his 1819 political writings on England following the Peterloo Massacre, The Masque of Anarchy, "Song to the Men of England", and "England in 1819".
