= James Bieri =

American psychologist (1927–2025)

James Bieri (June 13, 1927 – April 18, 2025) was an American psychologist, academic and biographer best known for his influential work in cognitive psychology and his acclaimed biography of the Romantic poet Percy Bysshe Shelley.

== Early life and education ==
James Bieri was born in Washington, D.C., on June 13, 1927. The youngest of five sons of a US Navy officer (Bernhard H. Bieri, who achieved the rank of Vice Admiral), Bieri grew up on both coasts. A pivotal life event occurred on December 7, 1941: Bieri was a teenager living with his parents and brother on Oahu and witnessed the Japanese bombing of Kaneohe Bay Naval Air Station minutes before the Pearl Harbor bombing. His father was out at sea at the time commanding the cruiser Chicago, and avoided harm.

From a young age, Bieri studied classical piano and played throughout his life. After serving in the Navy, Bieri pursued higher education, earning his undergraduate degree from Antioch College (1950) and his Ph.D. in psychology at Ohio State University (1953).

== Academic career ==
In 1955 Bieri introduced the concept of cognitive complexity, derived from his doctoral study with George A. Kelly. Subsequently, integrating ideas from information theory and psychophysics, Bieri and his research team from Columbia University published a volume entitled Clinical and Social Judgment: The Discrimination of Behavioral Information in 1966.

Bieri held teaching positions at Harvard University (Department of Social Relations), Columbia University (School of Social Work), City University of New York (Brooklyn College), and the University of Texas at Austin where he was professor and director of the clinical psychology training program. At UT-Austin, he also taught the interdisciplinary course "Psychology and Literature," inspired by his interest in contemporary and Romantic poetry.

== Shelley biography ==
After retiring from teaching, Bieri devoted himself to writing his biography of Percy Bysshe Shelley, an innovative and controversial poet of the English Romantic movement. Bieri drew on extensive archival research and his background in psychoanalysis to explore Shelley's complex personality and creative life. He also traveled extensively in England and Italy to trace Shelley's footsteps. Bieri was the first biographer to uncover the fact that Shelley had an illegitimate half-brother, adding insight to the poet's difficult childhood.

Bieri's two-volume biography of Percy Bysshe Shelley was published by the University of Delaware Press: Youth's Unextinguished Fire, 1792–1816 (2004), and the second volume, Exile of Unfulfilled Renown, 1816–1822 (2005). A one-volume second edition synthesizing both volumes was published in 2008 by Johns Hopkins University Press, spanning 900 pages and offering a comprehensive portrait of Shelley's life, psychology and literary achievement.

The biography was noted for its integration of psychological insight with literary scholarship, including new material on Shelley's family relationships, personal struggles, and emotional life. Scholars have described Bieri's work as a definitive study of Shelley that significantly enriched Romantic studies.

== Personal life and death ==
For much of his adult life, Bieri lived in Austin, Texas. He died peacefully at home in Austin on April 18, 2025, at the age of 97.

== Selected works ==
Books

- Clinical and Social Judgment: The Discrimination of Behavioral Information (John Wiley & Sons, 1966)
- Percy Bysshe Shelley: A Biography – Youth's Unextinguished Fire,1792–1816 (University of Delaware Press, 2004)
- Percy Bysshe Shelley: A Biography – Exile of Unfulfilled Renown, 1816–1822 (University of Delaware Press, 2005)
- Percy Bysshe Shelley: A Biography (One-volume edition, Johns Hopkins University Press, 2008)
