= The Masque of Anarchy =

1832 poem by Percy Bysshe Shelley

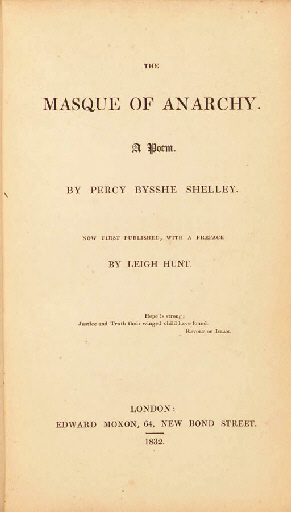
1832 first edition, printed by Bradbury and Evans, Edward Moxon, London.

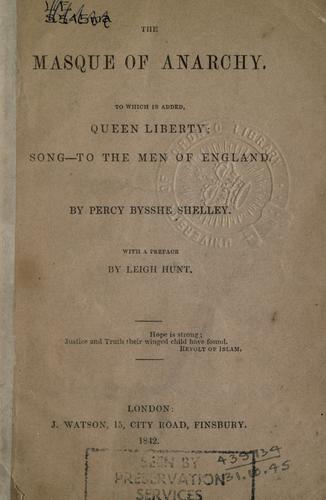
1842 title page, with added poems "Queen Liberty" and "Song-To the Men of England", J. Watson, London.

The Masque of Anarchy (or The Mask of Anarchy) is a British political poem written in 1819 by Percy Bysshe Shelley following the Peterloo Massacre of that year. In his call for freedom, it is perhaps the first modern statement of the principle of nonviolent resistance.

The poem was not published during Shelley's lifetime and did not appear in print until 1832, when published by Edward Moxon in London with a preface by Leigh Hunt. Shelley had sent the manuscript in 1819 for publication in The Examiner. Hunt withheld it from publication because he "thought that the public at large had not become sufficiently discerning to do justice to the sincerity and kind-heartedness of the spirit that walked in this flaming robe of verse". The epigraph on the cover of the first edition is from Shelley's The Revolt of Islam (1818): "Hope is strong; Justice and Truth their winged child have found."

Shelley wrote the poem while living in Italy in conjunction with other similar political works such as "England in 1819" and "Song to the Men of England".

The poem’s use of masque and mask has been discussed by Morton Paley; Shelley used mask in the manuscript but the first edition uses masque in the title. The poem has 372 lines, largely in four-line quatrains; two more quatrains appear in some manuscript versions.

Shelley had first enunciated and elaborated on his concepts of nonviolence and civil disobedience in his self-published pamphlets An Address, to the Irish People and Proposals for an Association of Philanthropists in 1812.

== Literary criticism ==
Political authors and campaigners such as Richard Holmes and Paul Foot, among others, describe it as "the greatest political poem ever written in English". In his book An Encyclopedia of Pacifism, Aldous Huxley noted the poem's exhortation to the English to resist assault without fighting back, stating "The Method of resistance inculcated by Shelley in The Mask of Anarchy is the method of non-violence".

Author, educator, and activist Howard Zinn refers to the poem in A People's History of the United States. In a subsequent interview, he underscored the power of the poem, suggesting: "What a remarkable affirmation of the power of people who seem to have no power. Ye are many, they are few. It has always seemed to me that poetry, music, literature, contribute very special power." In particular, Zinn uses "The Mask of Anarchy" as an example of literature that members of the American labour movement would read to other workers to inform and educate them.

== Use in politics ==
The rallying language of the poem had led to elements of it being used by political movements. It was recited by students at the Tiananmen Square protests of 1989 and by protesters in Tahrir Square during the Egyptian revolution of 2011. The phrase "like lions after slumber, in unvanquishable number" from the poem was used as a motto/slogan by the International Socialist Organization in their organ. The line "Ye are many-they are few" inspired the campaign slogan "We are many, they are few" used by protesters during the Poll tax riots of 1989–90 in the United Kingdom, and also inspired the title of the 2014 documentary film We Are Many, which focused on the global 15 February 2003 anti-war protests.

Jeremy Corbyn, the former leader of the British Labour Party, quoted the final stanza from the poem at his rally in Islington, on the final day of campaigning for the 2017 general election. Corbyn subsequently quoted the final stanza again during his speech at the Pyramid stage at the 2017 Glastonbury Festival. Academic and writer John Sutherland has suggested that the title of the party's 2017 manifesto, "For the Many, Not the few", was derived from the poem. The phrase was also used by UB40 for the title of their 2019 album For the Many. The phrase 'a community in which power, wealth and opportunity are in the hands of the many, not the few' also appears in the revised version of Clause IV of the Labour Party Constitution.

The same variation, "For The Many, Not The Few", was the sub-title to Robert Reich's 2016 book, Saving Capitalism. A translation of the phrase, "for det mange ikke for det få", was adopted by Norway's Socialist Left Party as its slogan in the 2020s.

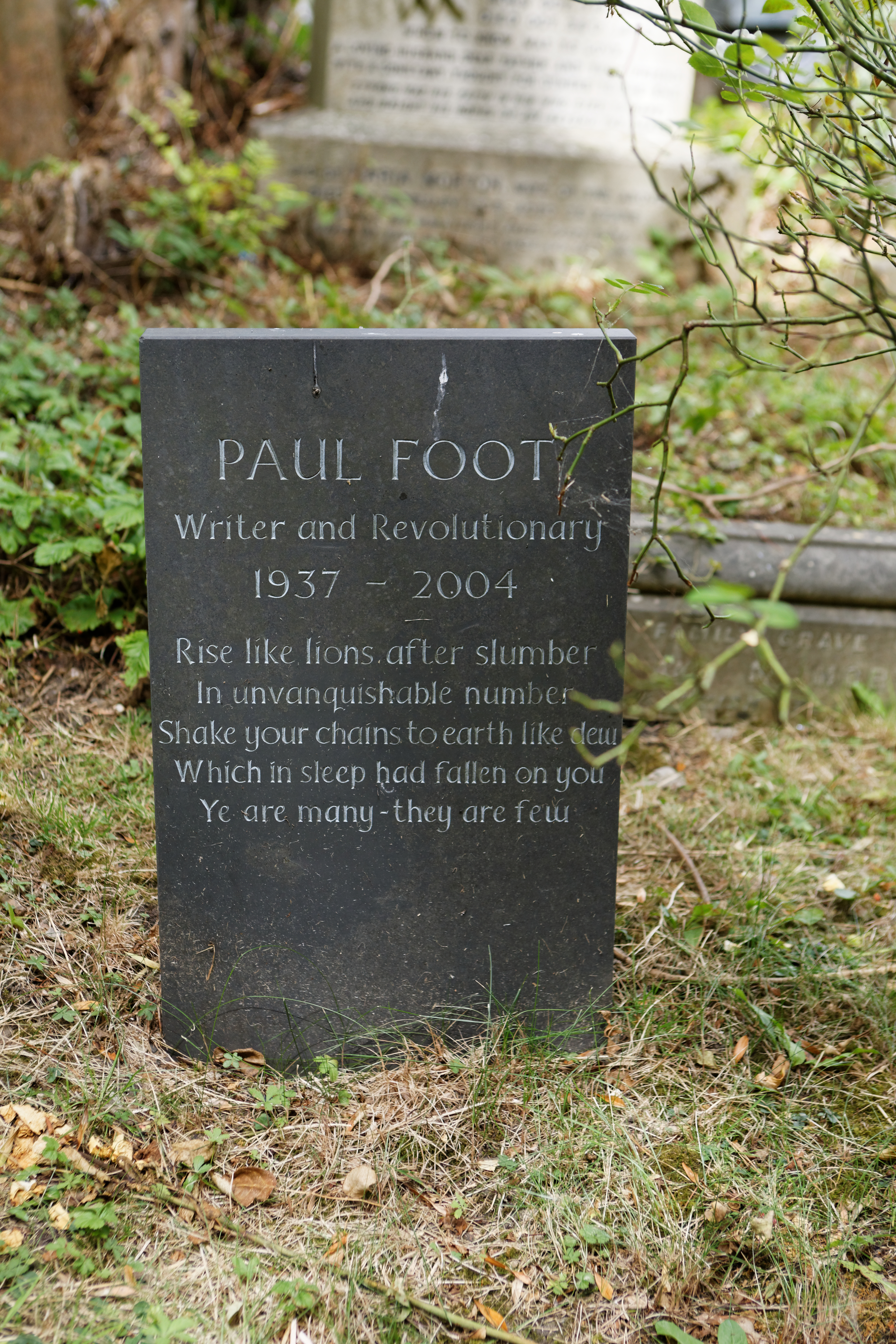
The final verse quoted on the tombstone of Paul Foot

The poem was also quoted on the back cover of The Jam's 1980 album Sound Affects.
