= An Address, to the Irish People =

Political pamphlet written by Percy Shelley

- The 1812 first edition title page of An Address, to the Irish People
- Author: Percy Bysshe Shelley
- Language: English
- Published: 24 February 1812
- Publisher: Self-published
- Publication place: Ireland
- Pages: 24

"An Address, to the Irish People" is a political pamphlet written by the English Romantic poet Percy Bysshe Shelley in 1812. It was first self-published in Dublin, Ireland that same year.

The address encouraged the Irish poor to seek Catholic Emancipation and the repeal of the Act of Union through peaceful, organized, and moral social reform. Shelley advocated for nonviolent resistance, advising against secret plots, mobs, and the use of force of any kind.

Though resulting in limited to no impact at the time, the work was significant as an early elaboration of Shelley's concepts of nonviolent and passive resistance, relying on moral superiority and the strength of numbers, which would be influential in the centuries to follow. He had earlier embraced the theme of reform in Ireland in the poem "The Irishman's Song" in the 1810 collection Original Poetry by Victor and Cazire.

== Background ==
Shelley went to Dublin on February 12, 1812, accompanied by his wife Harriet and her sister Elizabeth. They lived on 7 Lower Sackville Street (now O’Connell Street), the address which appeared on the pamphlet. Although written in England, he was able to print 1,500 copies of the pamphlet which were distributed in the city. Shelley himself threw copies from balconies, tucked it in ladies' bonnets, and sold it himself in pubs. It was sold for five pence to reach the "Irish poor" and to awaken them to their true social state. He addressed his appeal to: "Fellow Men, I am not an Irishman, yet I can feel for you."

Shelley saw Ireland as the perfect place for his activism. He felt he could redress the abuses and outrages committed there by the British government. The pamphlet was a major statement of his political ideals and beliefs focusing on nonviolent resistance and egalitarianism. He was convinced he had the political platform and agenda that would allow the Irish people to achieve emancipation on their own, by their own efforts in a nonviolent revolution. He admired Robert Emmet who was executed in 1803 after leading a failed rebellion in Ireland.

The Irish people need to "reform yourselves", by being virtuous and wise they can attain just equality. Shelley wrote: "Temperance, sobriety, charity and independence will give you virtue, and reading, talking, thinking and searching will give you wisdom; when you have those things you may defy the tyrant."

He advocated for religious tolerance and called for the unity of Protestants and Catholics.

He called for peaceful, non-violent protest and resistance, a "calm, principled case" for reform, achieved through intellect and virtue and not by means of force. Non-violent resistance relied on patience, calm, and the "power of thought" to achieve liberty and rights. He opposed secret plots, mob rule, and coercive methods. Force made the side using it "directly wrong". He argued that the fight was universal, as the working classes of Ireland and Britain shared a common cause in overthrowing tyranny and oppression and ensuring justice and equality.

With the achievement of Catholic Emancipation and the repeal of the Union Act would lead to a "greater reform" because the necessity of government would become less as people would have wisdom and virtue and thus coercion and force would be unnecessary. Shelley wrote: "Government is an evil; it is only the thoughtlessness and vices of men that make it a necessary evil. When all men are good and wise, government will of itself decay."

== Publication history ==
The pamphlet is dated from "No. 7 Lower Sackville Street, Feb, 22," published two days later on February 24. It was self-published by Shelley himself who rushed the printing of the pamphlet on his arrival in Dublin. It was a demy octavo pamphlet of twenty-four pages, "stabbed", without wrappers, consisting of a title page with blank reverse, on pages i.-ii. Due to the haste in the printing, it was "roughly and coarsely printed" with many typographical errors. It sold for five pence to make it affordable to workers and the poor. Subsequent to the address, Shelley wrote and printed during his stay in Ireland Proposals for an Association of Philanthropists (1812) and Declaration of Rights (1812).

It was included in The Prose Works of Percy Bysshe Shelley, Volume 1, along with A Proposal for an Association of Philanthropists and Declaration of Rights, edited by Harry Buxton Forman in 1880, published by Reeves and Turner in London.

The pamphlet was republished in 1890 under the title An address to the Irish people, by Percy Bysshe Shelley; reprinted from the original edition of 1812, edited by Thomas J. Wise, with an introduction by T.W. Rolleston in London for the Shelley Society by Reeves and Turner.

The work was also included in Shelley's Prose; or, The Trumpet of a Prophecy compiled and edited by David Lee Clark in 1954.

== Impact and influence ==
While it had a limited impact at the time and was disapproved of by William Godwin, dismissed as ineffectual, the experience deeply influenced Shelley's future radical activities and writings and was crucial and pivotal in the evolution and development of his views on non-violent protest which had a major influence on the policy of civil disobedience. Shelley's societal vision focused on the equitable distribution of wealth among the people of a country, the elimination or reduction of poverty, and the elimination of the rigid class structure.

In Shelley and Nonviolence, Art Young argued that "his approach to the eternal conflict between good and evil changed little from his early 'Address to the Irish People' until his final uncompleted The Triumph of Life." He concluded that "nonviolence is the political, philosophical, and ethical basis from which Shelley derives his reverence for life".

Shelley espoused his concepts of peaceful, nonviolent, civil disobedience and resistance in his address. He more fully developed the concepts in The Masque of Anarchy written in 1819 following the Peterloo Massacre.

Shelley's concepts on peaceful, nonviolent civil disobedience and resistance were influential on Mahatma Gandhi, Leo Tolstoy, Henry David Thoreau, Martin Luther King, Jr., and the Dalai Lama, and Nelson Mandela.

Shelley explained these principles in the address:

"[D]isclaim violence. ... In no case employ violence, the way to liberty and happiness is never to transgress the rules of virtue and justice. Liberty and happiness are founded upon virtue and justice, if you destroy the one, you destroy the other. ... If you can descend to use the same weapons as your enemy, you put yourself on a level with him on this score. ... But appeal to the sacred principles of virtue and justice, then how is he awed into nothing? how does truth show him in his real colours, and place the cause of toleration and reform in the clearest light. ... Are you slaves, or are you men? ... But you are men, a real man is free. ... Then firmly, yet quietly resist.

Shelley developed the philosophy and methodology of nonviolence as "a response to oppression, repression and marginalization". Although his principles of nonviolence "significantly impacted the formation of the philosophies and socio-political campaigns of later nonviolence activists", particularly Mahatma Gandhi, Shelley has not been "sufficiently credited for the ground-breaking political philosophy of nonviolence" which he elucidated, first in An Address, to the Irish People, and in The Masque of Anarchy.
