= England in 1819 =

Sonnet by Percy Bysshe Shelly

The Poetical Works of Percy Bysshe Shelley
- The 1839 first edition title page of The Poetical Works of Percy Bysshe Shelley
- Author: Percy Bysshe Shelley
- Language: English
- Published: 1839
- Publisher: Edward Moxon
- Publication place: England
- Pages: 314

ENGLAND IN 1819

An old, mad, blind, despised, and dying king,—
Princes, the dregs of their dull race, who flow
Through public scorn, mud from a muddy spring,—
Rulers who neither see, nor feel, nor know,
But leech-like to their fainting country cling,
Till they drop, blind in blood, without a blow,—
A people starved and stabbed in the untilled field,—
An army which liberticide and prey
Makes as a two-edged sword to all who wield,—
Golden and sanguine laws which tempt and slay;
Religion Christless, Godless, a book sealed,—
A Senate—Time's worst statute unrepealed,—
Are graves from which a glorious Phantom may
Burst to illumine our tempestuous day.

"England in 1819" is a political sonnet by the English Romantic poet Percy Bysshe Shelley which reflects his liberal ideals, protesting the corruption, economic hardship, and violence plaguing Britain. Written in 1819, it was not published until 1839 in The Poetical Works of Percy Bysshe Shelley.

It is a political sonnet that portrays England as a corrupt country in crisis after the 1819 Peterloo Massacre. The British leaders are castigated and attacked as "leech-like" parasites, King George III as "old, mad, blind, despised, and dying," and the princes as "dregs of their dull race." He depicts England as a country where injustice and inequality prevail, but concludes on a hopeful note that through a revolution a "glorious Phantom" will lead the country to a new and better future.

== Background ==
The poem was composed in 1819, but it was not published until 1839 in the four-volume The Poetical Works of Percy Bysshe Shelley (London: Edward Moxon), Volume III, edited by Mary Shelley.

Maintaining typical sonnet structure, "England in 1819" has fourteen lines and is written in iambic pentameter, but its rhyming scheme (ABABAB CDCD CCDD) differs from that of the traditional English sonnet (ABAB CDCD EFEF GG).

== Publication history ==
Written in September 1819 as a response to the Peterloo Massacre, it was initially suppressed. It remained unpublished during Shelley's lifetime due to the threat of sedition charges. It was published in 1839.

Shelley wrote the political sonnet while living in Italy in conjunction with other political works such as "The Mask of Anarchy" and "Song to the Men of England". The poem directly references the brutal killing of peaceful demonstrators in Manchester on August 16, 1819.

Shelley sent the poem to his friend, the publisher Leigh Hunt for publication. Hunt and other publishers determined that it was too risky to print. Reporting or writing sympathetically about the Peterloo Massacre was classified as seditious libel.

The poem was not published until 17 years after Shelley's death. It was published in 1839 in the four-volume collection The Poetical Works of Percy Bysshe Shelley.

== Summary ==
The poem was written as a response to the brutal Peterloo Massacre in August 1819.

The sonnet describes a very forlorn reality, an unrepresentative and moribund British monarchy, government corruption, and the violent oppression of the working class. The poem passionately attacks, as the poet sees it, England's decadent, oppressive ruling class. King George III, who had ruled since 1760, 59 years, is described as "old, mad, blind, despised, and dying".

The "leech-like" nobility ("princes") metaphorically suck the blood from the people, who are, in the sonnet, oppressed, hungry, and hopeless, their fields untilled.

Meanwhile, the army is corrupt and dangerous to liberty, the laws are harsh and useless, religion has lost its morality, and Parliament (the "Senate") is a relic. In addition, the civil rights of the Catholic minority are non-existent "Time's worst statute unrepealed".

In a startling burst of optimism, the last two lines express the hope that a "glorious Phantom" may spring forth from this decay and "illumine our tempestuous day": "Are graves from which a glorious Phantom may/ Burst, to illumine our tempestuous day."

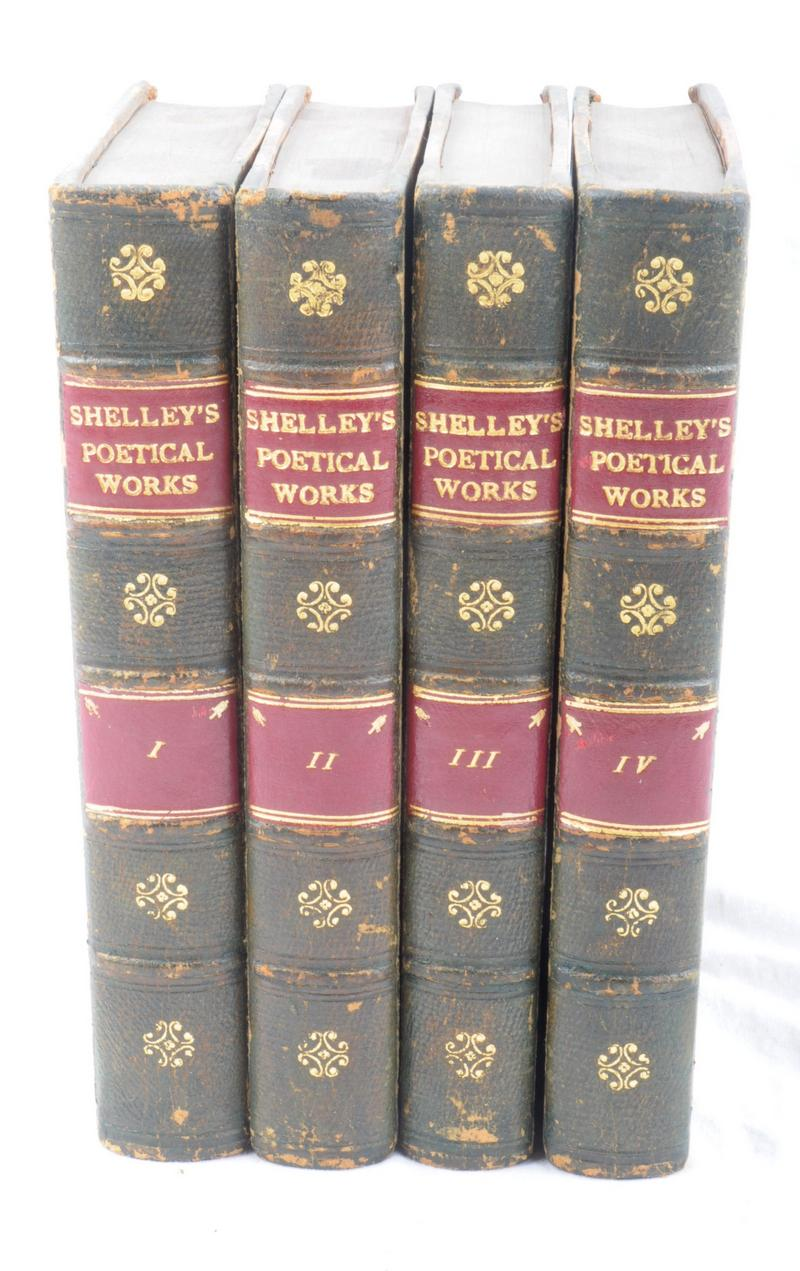
"England in 1819" first appeared in the four-volume The Poetical Works of Percy Bysshe Shelley, Vol. III, London: Edward Moxon, 1839.

== Sources ==
- A’yun, Annisa Qurrota. "The Social Condition of England during 1800-1900 Reflected in 'Song to the Man of England' and 'England in 1819' by Percy B. Shelley." Diss. Diponegoro University, 2015. Semarang, Indonesia. eprints.undip.ac.id
- Boyle, Catherine. Shelley in 1819: Poetry, Publishing and Radicalism. University of Surrey (United Kingdom), 1998.
- Cauchi, Francesca. "Blood and Mud in Shelley’s 'England in 1819'." The Explicator 81.1 (2023): 32-34.
- Chandler, James. England in 1819: The Politics of Literary Culture and the Case of Romantic Historicism. University of Chicago Press. 1998.
- Cox, Jeffrey N. Poetry and Politics in the Cockney School: Keats, Shelley, Hunt and their Circle (Cambridge Studies in Romanticism). Cambridge University Press, 2004.
- Cronin, Richard. "Asleep in Italy: Byron and Shelley in 1819." The Politics of Romantic Poetry: In Search of the Pure Commonwealth. London: Palgrave Macmillan UK, 2000, pp. 156-180.
- de Deus Duarte, Maria. "Garrett e Shelley: 'O Campode Sant'Anna' e 'England in 1819'." Revista de Estudos Anglo-Portugueses 11 (2002): 97-102.
- Duff, David. Romance and Revolution: Shelley and the Politics of a Genre (Cambridge Studies in Romanticism). Cambridge University Press, 2005.
- Jost, François. "Anatomy of an Ode: Shelley and the Sonnet Tradition." Comparative Literature, Vol. 34, No. 3 (Summer, 1982), pp. 223–246.
- Phillips, Brian. SparkNote on Shelley's Poetry. 18 Aug. 2007.
- MacEachen, Dougald B. CliffsNotes on Shelley's Poems. 18 July 2011.
- McDonagh, Josephine. "'England in 1819' in 2019 (2020)." Keats-Shelley Journal 69 (2020): 131-143.
- O’Neill, Michael. "1819–1820: 'The Torrent of My Indignation'." Percy Bysshe Shelley: A Literary Life. London: Palgrave Macmillan UK, 1989. 93-124.
- Rumens, Carol. "Poem of the week: England in 1819: This week, a furious sonnet from Shelley whose attack on the ruling classes retains its power two centuries on." Guardian, 23 February 2009.
- Stock, Paul. The Shelley-Byron Circle and the Idea of Europe (Palgrave Studies in Cultural and Intellectual History). Palgrave Macmillan, 2010.
- Vivante, Leone. "Shelley and the Creative Principle" in Shelley. Ed. George Ridenour. Englewood Cliffs: Prentice-Hall, 1965.
- Wasserman, Earl. Shelley: A Critical Reading. Baltimore: Johns Hopkins Press, 1971.
- Wasserman, Earl. The Subtler Language. Baltimore, Johns Hopkins Press, 1959.
- Wheatley, Kim. Shelley and His Readers: Beyond Paranoid Politics. University of Missouri, 1999.
- Wroe, Ann. Being Shelley: The Poet's Search for Himself. Pantheon, 2007.
