= Daniel Roberts (Royal Navy officer) =

English Royal Navy officer (1789–1869)

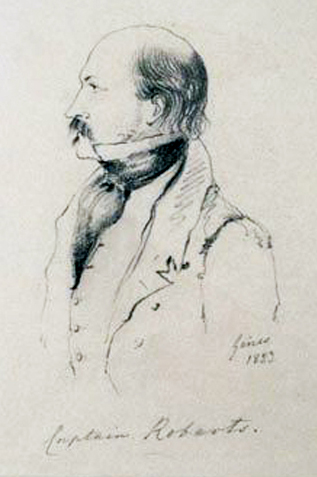
Sketch of Daniel Roberts by Count Alfred D’Orsay (Genoa 1821)

Daniel Roberts (18 February 1789 – 18 February 1869) was an officer in the Royal Navy who made a series of cameo-like appearances in the lives of Lord Byron, Percy Bysshe Shelley, Edward Ellerker Williams, and Edward John Trelawny. Roberts is best known for having designed and supervised the construction of Shelley's schooner, Don Juan, and Lord Byron's yacht, Bolivar.

== Early life ==
Daniel Roberts was born on 18 February 1789 in Shoreham-by-Sea, West Sussex, England; he died on his 80th birthday at three in the afternoon on the Island of La Maddalena off the northern coast of Sardinia. When his father Captain Henry Roberts died, Daniel was seven. Henry left his wife Harriet to care for their eight children. Nothing has been written about Daniel Roberts' childhood until, at the age of 10, he enlisted in the Royal Navy as a Volunteer 1st Class.

== Naval career ==
His career in the Royal Navy followed an atypical path. On enlisting (at the age of 10) in July 1799, he was assigned to the 64-gun HMS Overyssel (a ship captured from the Dutch, on 22 October 1795), stationed at the Nore (where the River Thames meets the North Sea). He spent four months aboard Oversyssel and then, as his service records reveal, he was discharged from the ship in November 1799.

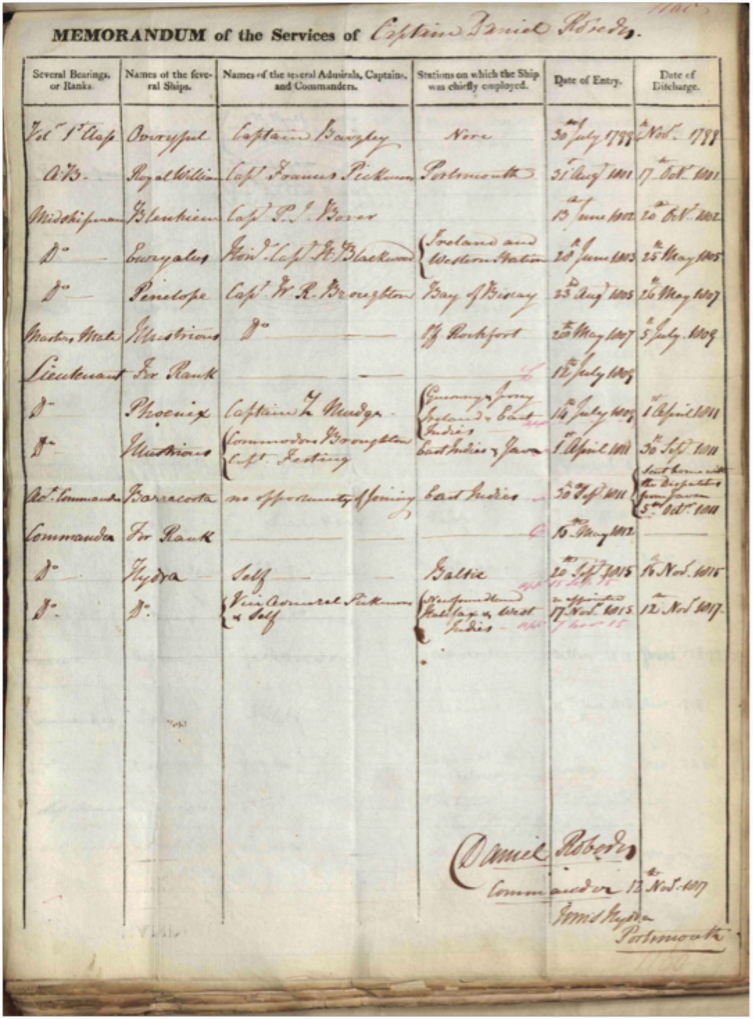
Memorandum of Service --- Captain Daniel Roberts (1817)

Roberts' naval Memorandum of Service is blank for 21 months until it shows he was assigned as an A.B. (Able seaman) to HMS Royal William at Portsmouth. Since the Navy preferred new enlistees be at least 13 years old, the most probable scenario is Roberts spent the next 20 months in a private school, which specialized in teaching navigation and preparing boys for sea. After seven weeks aboard Royal William, he was on shore for eight months until 13 June 1802, when he was ordered aboard HMS Blenheim, where at age 13 he served as a midshipman. After Roberts had served on board the Blenheim for four months, the vessel was ordered to be stored, and he was again on shore for another eight months.

On 28 June 1803, he was assigned to the recently launched HMS Euryalus, a 36-gun frigate. It was here, under a prominent naval personality, Captain Henry Blackwood, that at the age of 15, Daniel Roberts first experienced naval warfare in an assault on French vessels off Boulogne pier, in October 1804. After serving for almost two years under Captain Blackwood, and five months before Euryalus was to make a significant contribution to Nelson's fleet at the Battle of Trafalgar, Roberts was again on shore for three months. On 8 April 1805, he joined a hospital ship, HMS Trent for one month; then back on Euryalus for just two weeks and five days until on 23 August 1805 he joined another 36-gun frigate, HMS Penelope, stationed off the French coast in the Bay of Biscay. This ship did not join in the Battle of Trafalgar; instead she was part of the fleet, which was blockading the French coast. In August 1806, young midshipman Roberts was provided a few days of excitement when his ship almost captured Napoléon Bonaparte's younger brother Jérôme Bonaparte, captain of the Vétéran.

Roberts served aboard Penelope until 26 May 1807, when Captain William Robert Broughton took command of HMS Illustrious, a larger 74-gun Ship of the Line. How many members of his crew Captain Broughton took with him to Illustrious is not known; that Roberts, at the age of 18, was one of them, is proof that his Captain valued his service. Upon joining Illustrious, Roberts was made a Master's mate. Roberts was again on a ship that was to enter into combat. On the night of 11 April 1809, a British fleet of 25 ships attacked a powerful squadron of French ships anchored in the Basque Roads, a sheltered bay on the Biscay shore of France, bounded by the Ile d'Oléron to the west and Île de Ré to the north. The Battle of Basque Roads was initiated when the British sent several explosion ships into the Roads to blow holes in a mile-long boom of heavy spars and chains the French had placed to prevent enemy vessels from reaching their warships.

In the attack all but two of the French ships were driven ashore. Although the engagement was to last three days, the British failed to destroy the French fleet; however, one result of the engagement was that on 12 July 1809, Master's mate Daniel Roberts, age 20, was promoted to lieutenant. For the next two years he was on board HMS Phoenix, a 36-gun frigate. On 10 January 1810, Roberts' ship chased the 14-gun French privateer Charles, but her prey was lost in a thick fog. The following day, the Phoenix discovered her adversary anchored close to the French coast. A boarding attack was launched and, when Charles, resisted, one British marine was killed and another wounded. In this engagement Roberts was in charge of one of the boats that carried marines and seamen who boarded the Charles. The attack succeeded, and on board the prize they found two English masters and 13 seamen who had been taken out of vessels a few days previously.

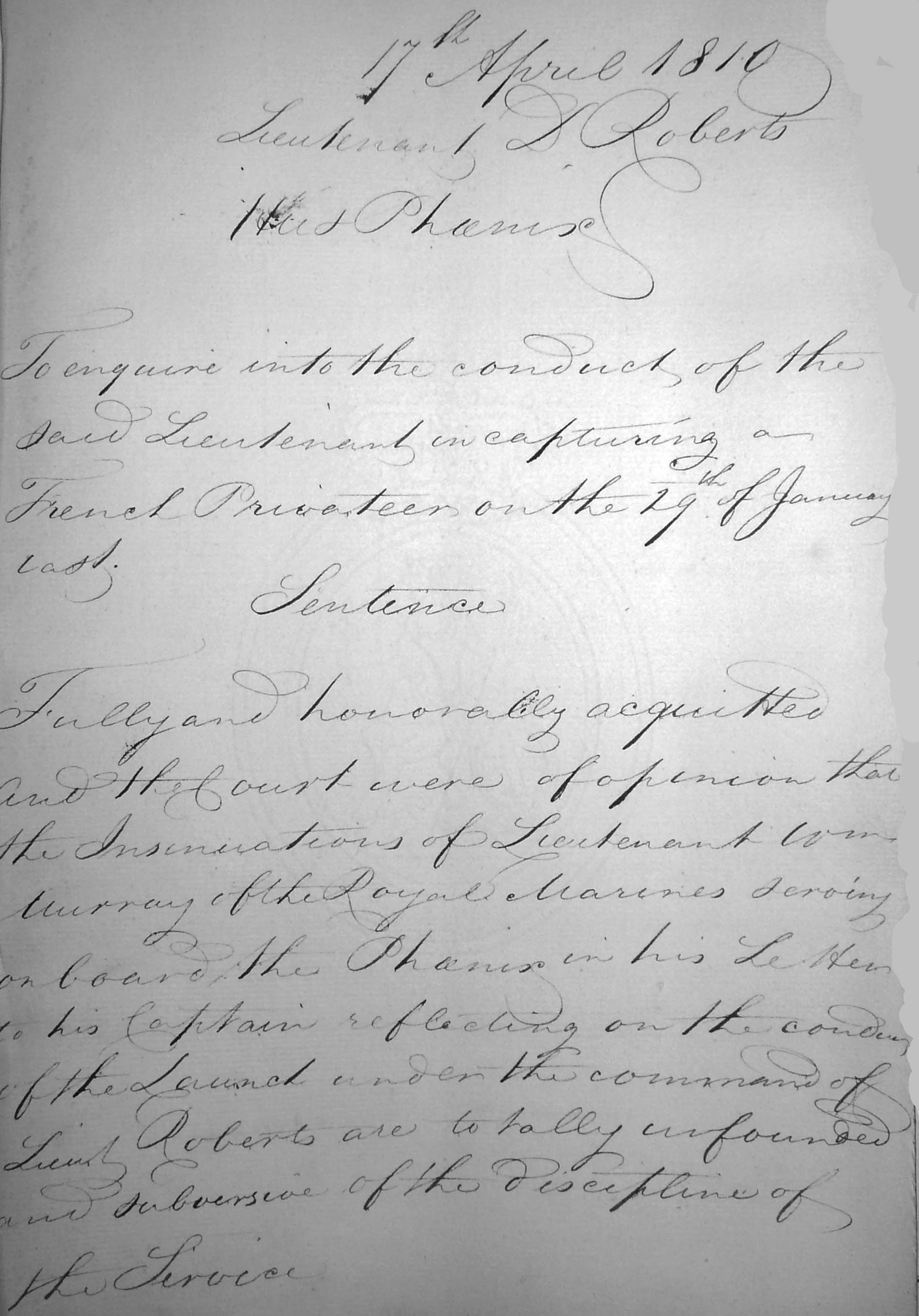
Result of Court Martial of Daniel Roberts. 1810

This event led to Roberts' court martial. His conduct during the battle was criticized by a marine officer of Phoenix, Lieutenant William Murray, who wrote a letter of accusation to the captain of the ship. Consequently, a commission to judge Roberts' professional behaviour was formed. On 17 April 1810 not only were all the accusations discharged, his behaviour was considered worthy and honourable while Murray's accusation were labelled as "totally unfounded and subversive of the discipline of the Service." Within the next few months, Phoenix sailed to the East Indies where she would remain for almost a year. On 1 April 1811, Roberts rejoined HMS Illustrious, where in 1809 he had served as a Masters Mate under Captain William Robert Broughton; now he was wearing the uniform of an officer. Three months later, his ship was engaged in combat with the enemy in the invasion of Java.

Roberts' posting to Illustrious was short lived, for on 5 October 1811, he was sent home with the dispatches. Roberts' service record does not indicate where he was stationed from 17 May 1812 until he was posted to a ship of his own on 20 September 1815. Although he held the rank of commander it was proper for his crew to call him Captain. The entry in his Memorandum of Service, following that of promotion to Commander, was his assignment to HMS Hydra on 20 September 1815.

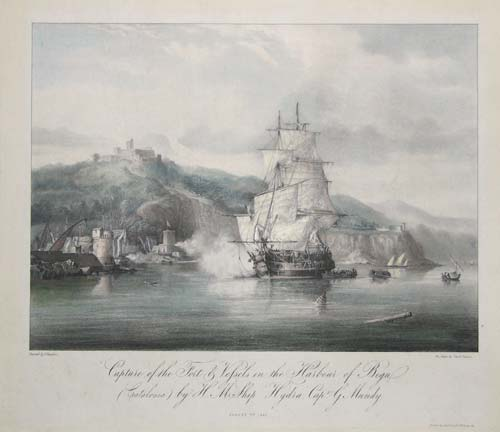
HMS Hydra

This vessel was built in 1797, at Gravesend, as a 38-gun frigate. When Roberts joined the ship, she was a troopship. The Battle of Waterloo (18 June 1815) occurred three months before he took command of Hydra; the war had ended. After being in the Baltic for two months before the Treaty of Paris (1815) was signed, he sailed for the West Indies, on 12 November 1815.

Roberts commanded his troopship for two years. He returned to England from Canada between 3 September 1817, when the following article was published in ‘'The Edinburgh Observer'’ and 12 November 1817, when he was discharged from the Hydra.

The Hydra store-ship, Captain Roberts, has taken the 15th regiment from the Leeward Islands to Halifax; the 2d battalion 60th regiment is likewise to be removed thence, by her, to Canada, The 104ih regiment is to be reduced in Canada, being formed of natives of the British colonies. The 19th regiment of light dragoons are ordered home from Canada.

== Retirement ==
There is no written record of Roberts' activities between the time of his discharge, 12 November 1817, and when he was in the south of France in May 1820. The funds he accumulated from his eighteen years in service plus his retirement pension was enough for him not to feel the need to find employment. It was common for military officers with small incomes to retire to the continent where the cost of living was much lower than in England. France, Switzerland and Italy were favourites. Roberts documented his retirement in a series of Journals, which are now housed in the Keats-Shelley Memorial House in Rome.

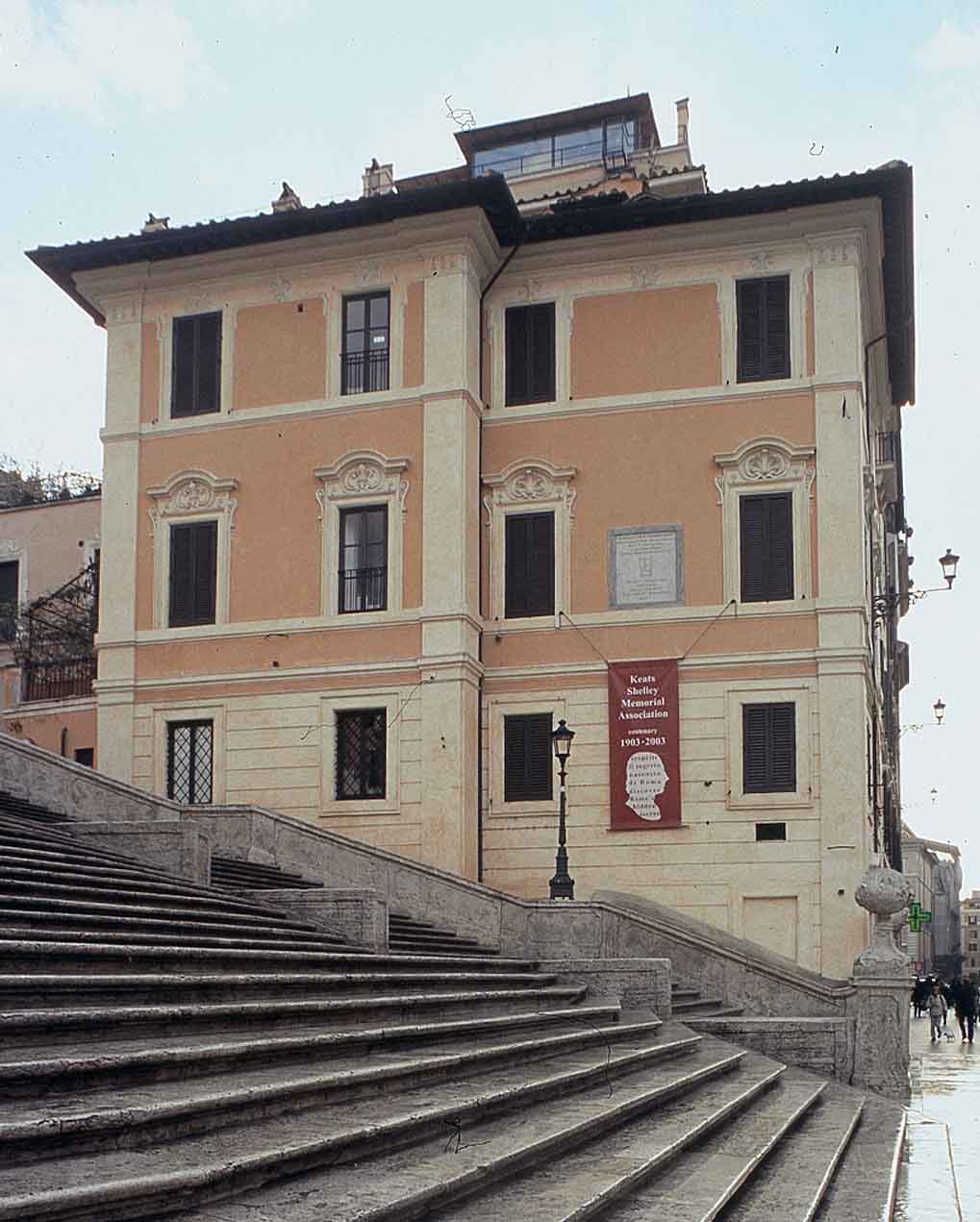
The Keats-Shelley House in Rome

These Journals are covered in detail in A Biography of Captain Daniel Roberts by Donald Prell. They cover a span of 20 years, from 18 May 1820 to 3 August 1840, with the exception of the time Roberts was with Byron, Shelley and the other members of their Pisan Circle.

== Roberts, Shelley and Byron ==
Daniel Roberts was responsible for the design and construction of Shelley's schooner, Don Juan, and Lord Byron's yacht, Bolivar. A week before Shelley and Williams were drowned in a storm off of the coast of Italy (8 July 1822), Roberts had sailed with them in the Don Juan on the exact reverse course they were taking when the tragedy occurred. In June 1823, Byron asked Roberts to join his entourage, which was to sail to Greece. Roberts declined the invitation, preferring to remain in Genoa; he did however join with Byron's banker in locating and arranging for the charter of the merchant brig Hercules, the vessel that took Byron to Missolonghi, where he died in 1824. Throughout his life, Roberts maintained a close friendship with Edward Trelawny. It was Trelawny who asked Roberts to design the boats for the poets. A year following the fatal accident, Roberts purchased the remains of the schooner Don Juan' and after making repairs, he sailed it single-handed for several years. After losing the Don Juan Roberts purchased the Bolivar, which Byron had sold prior to going to Greece. These voyages are fully covered in his Journals. Roberts also continued corresponding with other members of the Pisan Circle, such as Mary Shelley and Claire Clairmont.

== Last years ==
The final entry in Roberts' Journal IV:

Edw. and Collins sailed for Leghorn. My time spent cultivating and grafting trees. Heavy rain nearly all April. May came in with fine weather and hot season. Monday 4th [May] I hove down and cleaned the bottom in the sandy port near my Vineyard. excellent for small craft. althou surrounded by rocks --- good fishing. Wrote four letters the 3 August 1840.

Roberts did not record when he was no longer living on his boat. From the above journal entry, it is known he acquired a vineyard sometime before August 1840. Records indicate it was located on the northeastern shore of La Maddalena.

His last years are covered by Authors Giovanna Sotgiu and Alberto Sega in their book describing a group of English citizens who lived in La Maddalena during the 19th century. A chapter is dedicated to Captain Roberts.

Another sign of the improvement of Roberts' financial conditions is the fact that, until 1846, he co-owned an 8 ton merchant ship; it is not clear if this ship, named Colombo was used for the trades of Edward West: there is no mention of the ship on the documents regarding him. His life at this point seems to be finally stable - he did not live on his boat any more although he would still dedicate a lot of his time in working on it so that he could move freely – and he lets the elegant building [Palazzo Roberts] located east of the port of Cala Gavetta, owned by the Zicavo family.

In 1857, when Edward Trelawny was preparing to publish his Recollections of the last days of Shelley and Byron, he asked Roberts to make a sketch of Casa Magni, where Shelley had been living at the time of his drowning. Trelawny not only included Robert's sketch, he published a number of extracts from Robert's letters. Roberts was to live another eleven years. He died on his 80th birthday, 18 February 1869 at 3:00 in the afternoon. No details can be found as to the cause of his death.

== Timeline ==
18 February 1789 Captain Roberts was born in Shoreham, West Sussex, England.

23 March 1789 New Shoreham baptism records show that a Daniel Roberts, son of Henry and Harriett Roberts was baptized on that date.

25 August 1796 Henry Roberts, Captain of the UNDAUNTED, died in the West Indies, where he caught yellow fever.

30 July 1799 Daniel Roberts entered the Navy as Volunteer First Class. He spent four months on board the OVERYSSEL 64; stationed at the Nore under Capt. John Bazely.

1 August 1801 Spends eight weeks at Portsmouth, aboard HBMS ROYAL WILLIAM, under Capt. Fras. Pickmore.

1 June 1802 From June to Oct. 1802, he served as Midshipman on board BLENHEIM, under Capt. Philip Turner Bower.

1 June 1803 Joined the newly launched HMS EURYALUS 36, under Captain Hon. Henry Blackwood; staying with the ship until 5 January 1805.

1 August 1805 Stationed on the coast of France in the PENELOPE 36 and, as Master's Mate, in the ILLUSTRIOUS 74, both commanded by Capt. Wm. Robt. Broughton.

12 July 1809 Promoted to the rank of Lieutenant.

14 July 1809 Serves almost two years on the Home and East India stations aboard the PHOENIX 36, under Capt. Zachary Mudge.

17 May 1810 Court Martial accusations discharged, his behavior was considered worthy and honorable

1 April 1811 Returns to the ILLUSTRIOUS 74, bearing the broad pendant of his former Cap. Broughton (under whom he was involved in taking the island of Java).

30 September 1811 Nominated Acting-Commander of the BARRACOUTA sloop; a vessel, he was never able to join.

5 October 1811 Sent home with the dispatches from Java.

16 May 1812 Promotion to the rank of Commander.

15 September 1815 His last appointment was to HMS HYDRA, a troopship in which he served on the Baltic, Newfoundland, Halifax, and West India stations.

7 November 1815 He is listed as Captain of the HYDRA; its location was in the Baltic.

13 September 1817 The HYDRA store-ship, Captain Roberts has taken the 25th regiment from the Leeward Islands to Halifax; the 2nd battalion 60th regiment is likewise to be removed thence, by her, to Canada.

12 November 1817 Discharged from HMS HYDRA.

20 September 1820 According to Edward John Trelawny: When Roberts and Trelawny were staying at a hotel in Lausanne, Roberts made the acquaintance of two English ladies when he was sketching in the town. When introductions were made, it turned out that they were Mary and Dorothy Wordsworth.

26 December 1821 In a letter to Trelawny, Edward E. Williams wrote: "Have a boat we must and if we can get Roberts to build her, so much the better."

15 January 1822 From Williams' Journal: "Trelawny called, and brought with him the model of an American schooner on which it is settled with S[helley] & myself to build a boat 30 feet long, and T[relawny] writes to Roberts in Genoa to commence on it directly."

25 January 1822 From Williams' Journal: "Trelawny heard from Roberts about the boat."

5 February 1822 in a letter from Trelawny to Roberts (who was in Genoa), Trelawny issued instructions regarding building a tender for Byron's yacht, the Bolivar.

12 February 1822 From Williams' Journal: "Trelawny called and brought with him Roberts' drawing of Lord B's boat."

21 March 1822 From Williams' Journal:"Trelawny called. He has heard from Roberts that S[helley] 's boat will be launched today."

27 March 1822 From Williams' Journal: "A letter from Roberts to T[relawny] informs us that the boat will not be finished in less than 12 or 14 days."

30 March 1822 From Williams' Journal: "Wrote to Roberts at Genoa about a house."

1 April 1922 From Williams' Journal: "Heard from Roberts about the boat."

5 April 1822 From Williams' Journal: "Called on Trelawny with a letter from Roberts – S[helley’s] boat to be finished in 10 days."

8 April 1822 From Williams' Journal: "Heard from Roberts at Genoa---no Houses to be had in an eligible situation nearer than Villa Francha near Nice."

05-17-1822From Williams' Journal: "Unbent the main sail and took it to Magliana to see if the letters could be erased which Lord B[yron] in his contemptible vanity or for some other purpose begged of Roberts to inscribe on the boat’s main sail---all efforts useless."

13 June 1822 From Williams' Journal: "The Bolivar with Roberts and Trelawny on board are taking her round to Livorno. Roberts and Trelawny dined here."

14 June 1822 From Williams' Journal: "Went with Roberts to try the river for trout about 10 miles up from Santa Stephano."

15 June 1822 From Williams' Journal: "Roberts and T. dined and in the evening Mary [Shelley] and Jane [Williams] go on board."

16 June 1822 From Williams' Journal: "Roberts unrigged the Don Juan and got the masts on deck---his men employed putting tressel-trees to the masts as he intends to fit 2 topmasts to her."

17 June 1822 From Williams' Journal: "Consulted with Roberts and S[helley] about a false stern."

1 July 1822 From Williams' Journal: "At 2 stretched across to Lerici to pick up Roberts and ½ past found ourselves in the offering with a side wind. At ½ past 9 arrived at Leghorn---a run of 45 to 50 miles in 7 hours and a half." (This day Roberts that sailed with Williams was just one week before Shelley and Williams were drowned while returning to their home near Livorno.)

14 September 1822 From Pisa, Roberts writes to Mary Shelley about finding the Don Juan.

18 September 1822 Roberts writes to Trelawny informing him about his letter of 14 September to Mary Shelley. He then describes the condition of the Don Juan, what Byron wishes to do with it and his plans for Byron's yacht the Bolivar.

21 September 1822 Byron writes to Trelawny: " Thank you, I was just going to send you down some books, and the compass of the Don Juan, which I believe belongs to Captain Roberts."

15 May 1823 Roberts is with Trelawny, sailing along the coast of Italy.

26 May 1823 Roberts writes to Trelawny: "Between you and me, I think, there is small chance of Byron’s going to Greece; so I think from the wavering manner in which he speaks of it; he said the other day, 'Well, Captain, if we do not go to Greece, I am determined to go somewhere and hope we shall all be at sea together by next month, as I am tired of this place, the shore, and all the people in it.'"

1 June 1823 Count Alfred D’Orsay produces a sketch of Roberts during a visit to Lady and Lord Blessingtion's residence in Genoa.

5 June 1823 Roberts writes to Trelawny about Byron selling the Bolivar to Lord Blessington, and about Byron's desire for Trelawny's opinion of what steps to take to prepare for a trip to Greece.

18 June 1823 Roberts and Charles F. Barry (Lord Byron's Banker) arrange for the charter of the merchant Brig Hercules, the vessel, which took Byron to Greece where he died in 1824.

30 June 1823 Declines Lord Byron's invitation to join the Greek expedition.

20 October 1825 From Cephalonia, Ionian Islands, Trelawny writes to Roberts about having been shot and almost killed.

1833–1840 Spends 8 years charting Western Italian waters from Nice to La Maddalena.

25 June 1845 Accepts the rank of Captain (Rtd.) at half-pay of £191 12s 6d.

1 December 1857 Sends Trelawny a woodcut of the Villa Magni, which contains a sketch of a boat, which Trelawny incorrectly identifies as Shelley's yacht, the Don Juan.

7 December 1857 Trelawny acknowledges Roberts letter of 1 December, and points out to Roberts, his errors in depicting the Villa Magni.

2 April 1858 Receives a letter from Trelawny acknowledging his place in Trelawny's Recollections of the Last Days of Shelley and Byron.

19 September 1858 Receives a letter from Trelawny asking "How are you?---In your last letter you were slowly recovering from what you called an attack of apoplexy but what I should have called Epilepsy." In the letter, Trelawny asks Roberts: " What sort of Isle is Maddalena -- extent, population--sort of inhabitants---productions? - how good and how situated"

18 February 1869 Roberts dies in La Maddalena, age 80.

== Examples of pages from Roberts' Journals ==
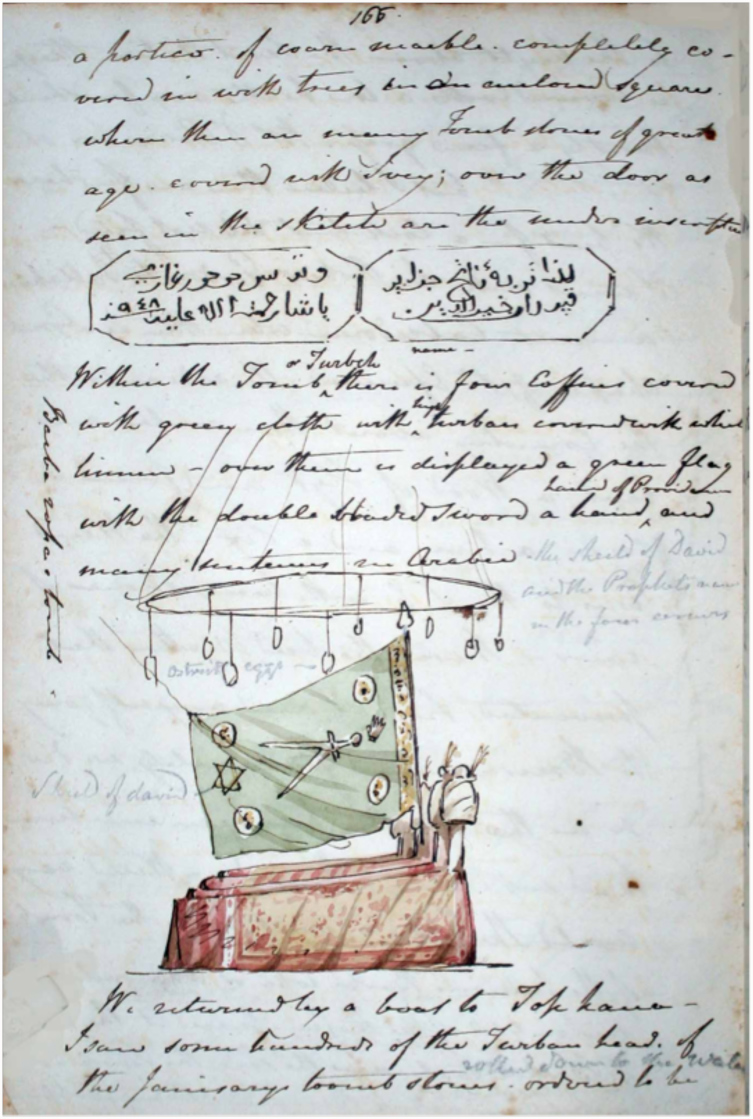

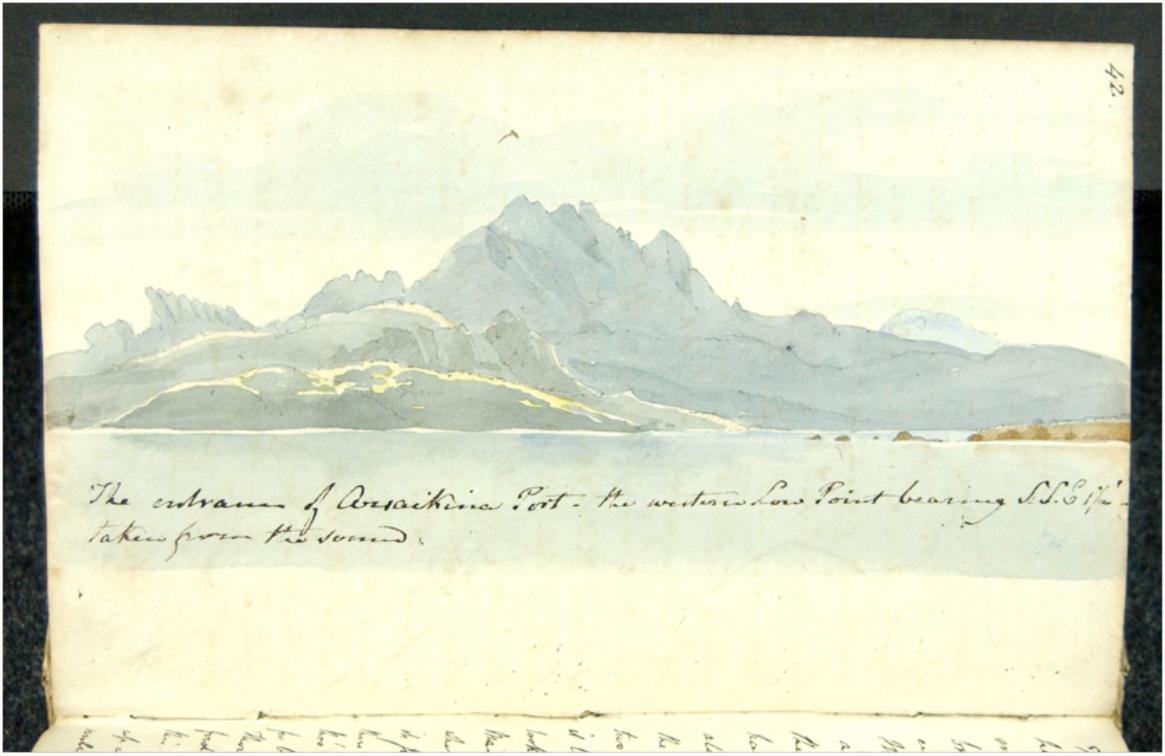

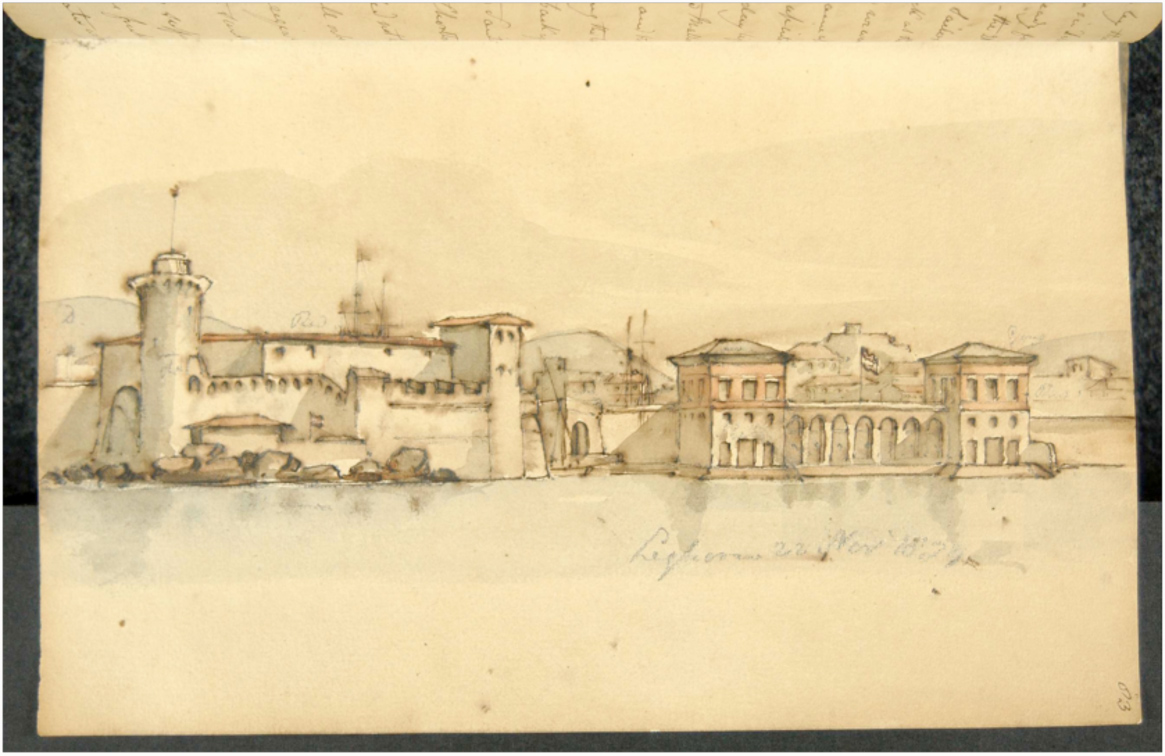

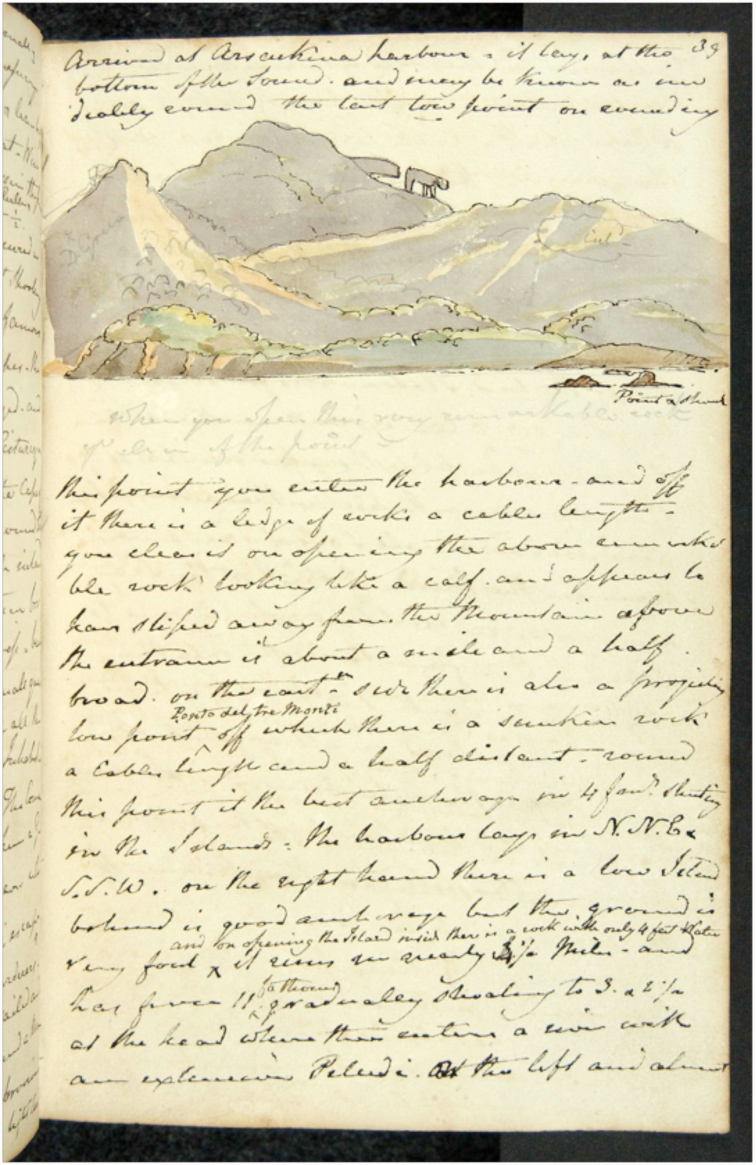

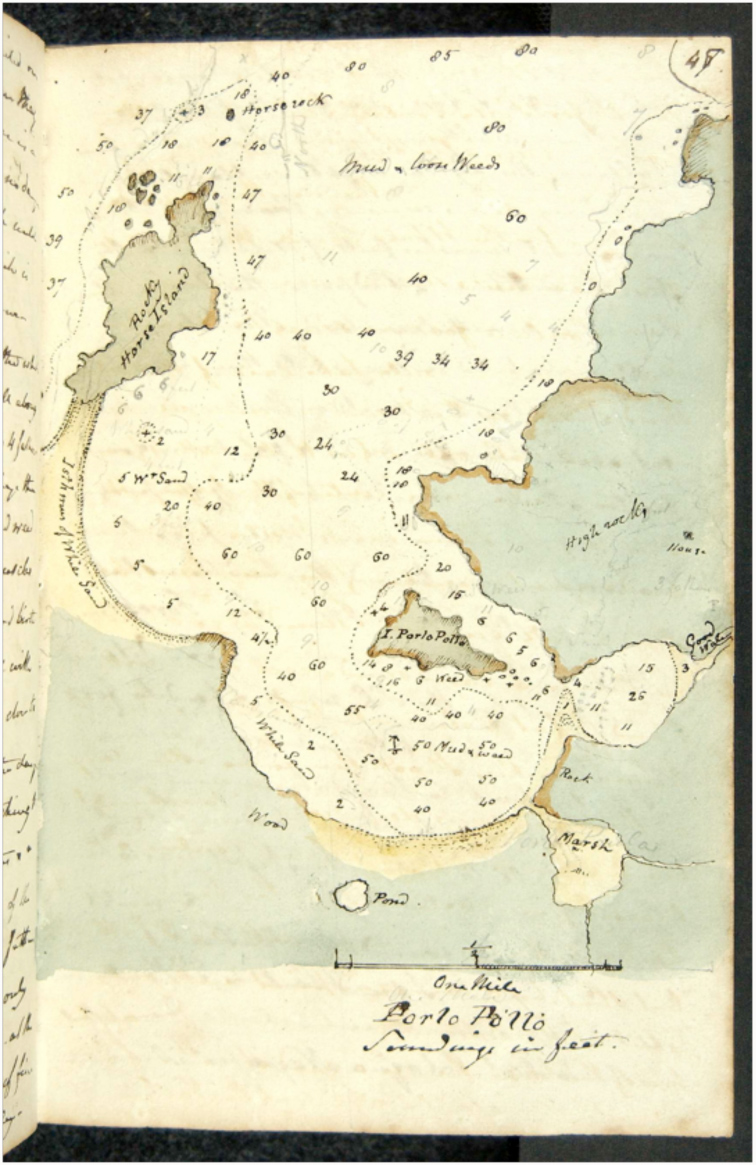

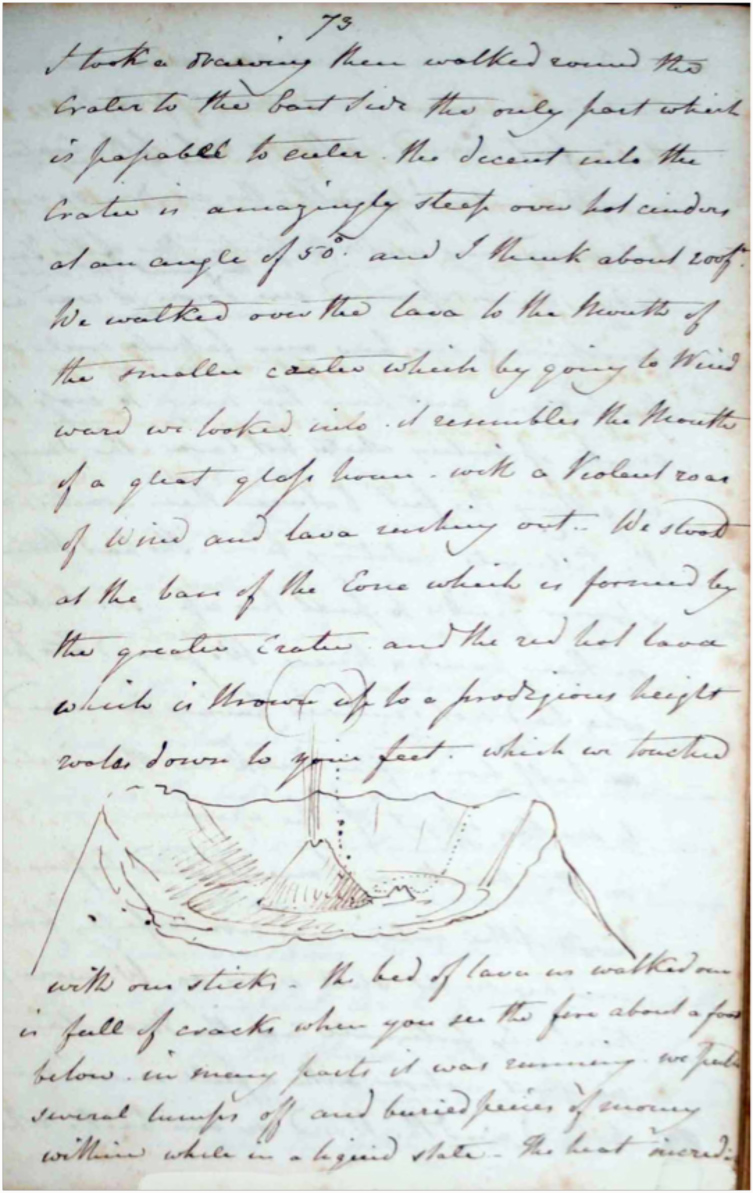

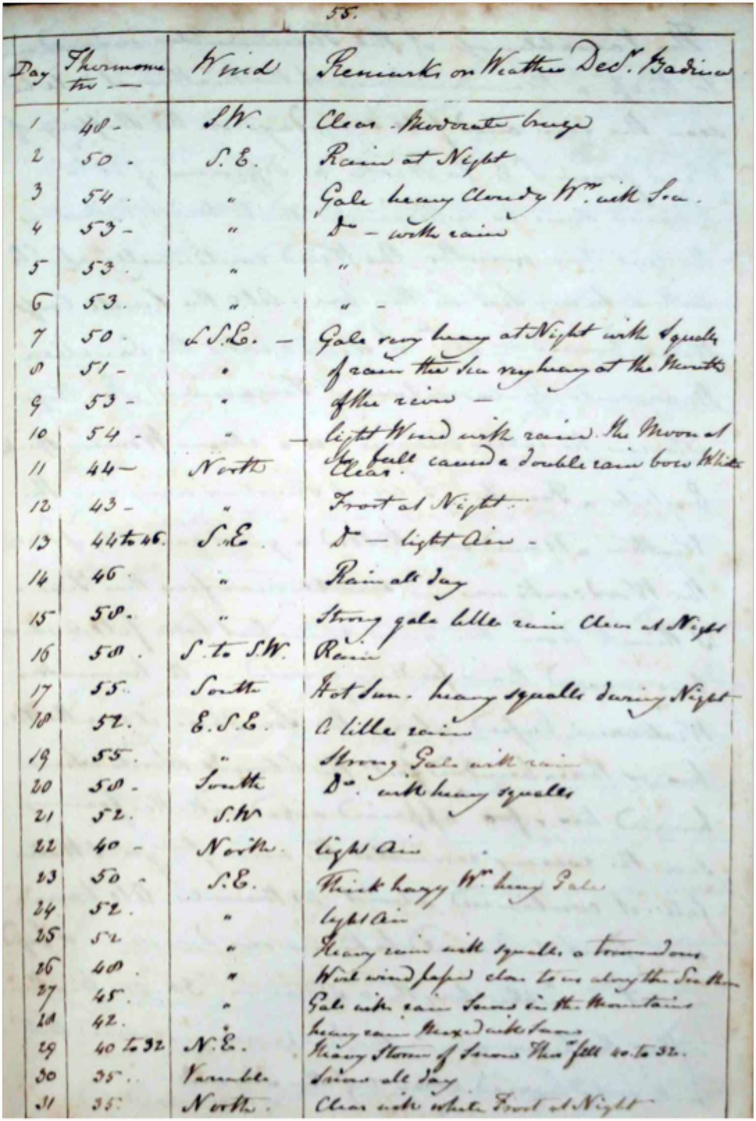
