= The Funeral of Shelley =

Painting by Louis Édouard Fournier

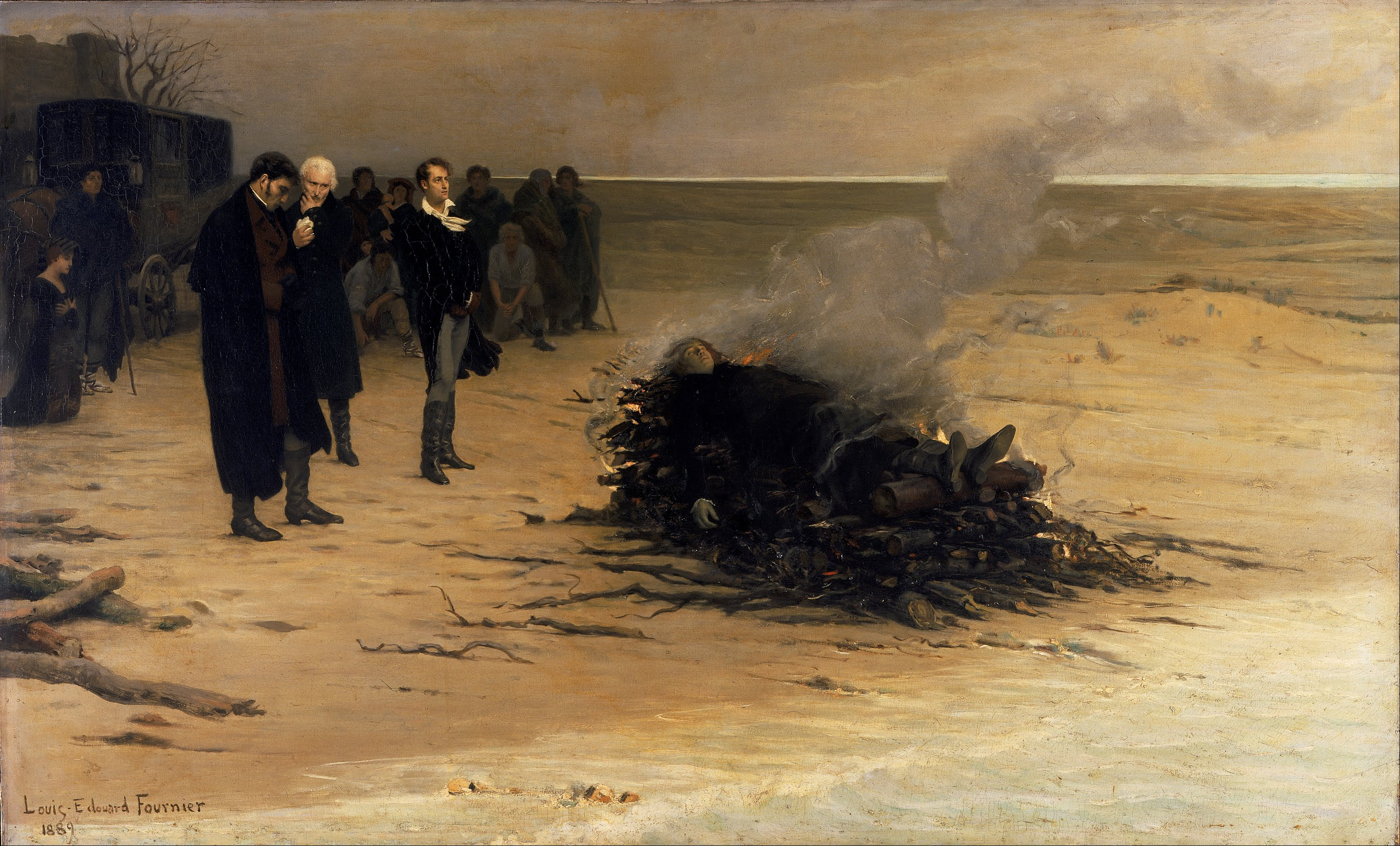
- Artist: Louis Édouard Fournier
- Year: 1889
- Medium: Oil on canvas
- Location: Walker Art Gallery, Liverpool

The Funeral of Shelley is an 1889 painting by the French artist Louis Édouard Fournier (1857–1917). The painting, which is considered Fournier's most famous work, is held in the permanent collection of the Walker Art Gallery in Liverpool, England.

The canvas depicts a funeral pyre on a beach in Viareggio, Italy where in 1822 the English Romantic poet Percy Bysshe Shelley's body washed ashore after he drowned while sailing on his schooner "Don Juan" (named after the work by Byron) on the Gulf of Spezia during a storm; he could not swim. The scene it depicts is said to be partially historically inaccurate.

Fournier shows Percy Shelley's friend Lord Byron and his wife the novelist Mary Shelley as attending the event. However, it is said neither actually stood in attendance during the immolation (Byron, uneasy over the sight of the body, went swimming in the sea, and Mary Shelley was elsewhere nearby, as was customary for widows at that time). It is also said that Shelley was actually immolated in a furnace brought to the beach. The three men who are depicted watching are Edward John Trelawny (from whose written account we know much of what occurred), Leigh Hunt, and Lord Byron himself. Mary Shelley is depicted in the background, kneeling on the sand on the far left.
