= Louis Édouard Fournier =

French painter and illustrator (1857–1917)

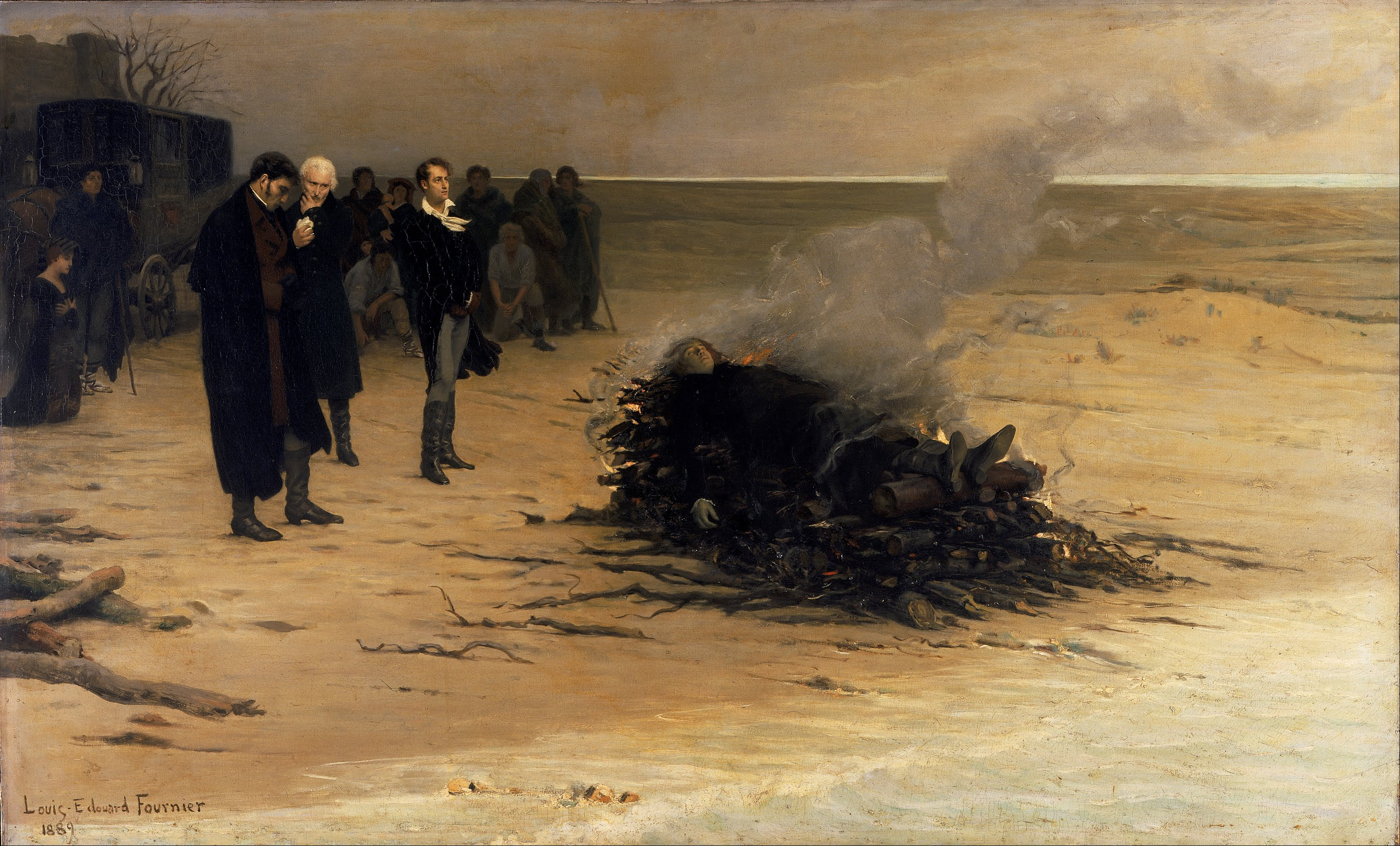
The Funeral of Shelley by Louis Édouard Fournier (1889); pictured in the centre are, from left, Trelawny, Hunt, and Byron

Louis Édouard Fournier (12 December 1857 – 10 April 1917) was a French painter and illustrator.

== Biography ==
Fournier studied with Alexandre Cabanel, Jules Joseph Lefebvre, and Gustave Boulanger. In 1881 he won the first prize of the prestigious Prix de Rome with a painting with the subject of Achilles' anger appeased by Minerva. He also participated in the Paris Salon and in 1900 received a medal and the Legion of Honor. He also received awards in the Salon of 1889 and the Exposition Universelle of 1890.

Fournier participated in many large-scale artistic endeavors, chief of which was the creation of frescoes for the decoration of the Grand Palais in Paris, in association with other artists including Alexandre Falguière. Fournier also created many mosaic friezes, considered at the time milestones in French art.

One of his most celebrated frescoes, "Aux gloires du Lyonnais et du Beaujolais" is in the Deliberation Room in the Council General of Rhône in Lyon. He also produced a series of paintings devoted to the beauties of Lyon, along with many wood carvings.

One of his most famous works is The Funeral of Shelley (1889; held by the Walker Art Gallery in Liverpool), shown here.

Fournier also illustrated numerous books, including works of Jean de La Fontaine and Honoré de Balzac, most notably The Duchess of Langeais.
