= Byron's letters =

Correspondence of the poet Lord Byron

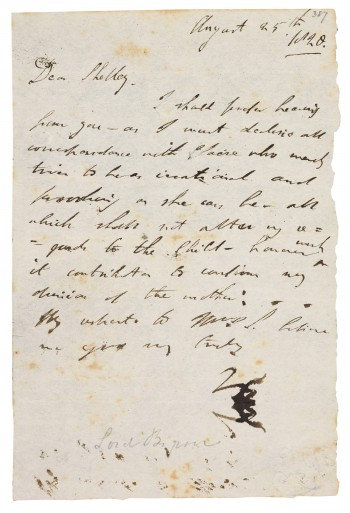
A short note to Percy Bysshe Shelley

The letters of Lord Byron, of which about 3,000 are known, range in date from 1798, when Byron was 10 years old, to 9 April 1824, a few days before he died. They have long received extraordinary critical praise for their wit, spontaneity and sincerity. Many rate Byron as the greatest letter-writer in English literature, and consider his letters comparable or superior to his poems as literary achievements. They have also been called "one of the three great informal autobiographies in English", alongside the diaries of Samuel Pepys and James Boswell. Their literary value is reflected in the huge prices collectors will pay for them; in 2009 a sequence of 15 letters to his friend Francis Hodgson was sold at auction for almost £280,000.

== Analysis ==
Although in his letters Byron adapted his style and stance to his different correspondents, they all share an unstudied, unliterary appearance, an "offhand eloquence", which at its best resembles the talk of a conversationalist of genius. He never wrote to produce an effect. Lord Macaulay, in one of his essays, wrote that Byron's letters "are less affected than those of Pope and Walpole, [and] have more matter in them than those of Cowper"; if literary art was employed it was "that highest art which cannot be distinguished from nature". All are deeply imbued with his volatile and indefinable personality, which, for those who find his personality offensive, can be something of a disadvantage. They are marked by rapid alternations of mood, by common sense, wit, intellect and sincerity, and by a cool and unshakeable scepticism. They fascinate the reader through the huge zest for life they manifest. They share with his poems the characteristics of vigour and movement. "Everything is said without reserve, without attenuation, savagely", wrote André Maurois; they "[sweep] the reader along in an irresistible onrush". They repeat words as if they were rhymes, and have rhythms that resemble those of the poems apart from being more varied. They share the outlook on life of Byron's more realistic poems, like Beppo, Don Juan and The Vision of Judgment, rather than the darkly romantic Childe Harold, Manfred and The Corsair.

== The number of letters ==
Although Byron's life was cut short at the age of only 36, almost 3000 letters of his are known. There are three main reasons why that number is so large: one is simply the pleasure Byron took in composing them; another is the fact that Byron spent many years in self-imposed exile in Italy and Greece, which made it necessary for him to write to keep in touch with his friends in England; and finally, the sensational success of Childe Harold's Pilgrimage when Byron was only 23 turned him into a national and then international celebrity, making his letters valuable relics to be collected rather than thrown away.

== Correspondents ==
Byron's correspondents can be divided up into successive groups. As a boy he wrote to his mother, his half-sister Augusta, and the family lawyer John Hanson. At Southwell there were John Pigot and his sister Elizabeth. Byron's friends at college included Scrope Davies, John Cam Hobhouse and Francis Hodgson. With the publication of Childe Harold he became known to a new circle, the poets Robert Charles Dallas, Thomas Moore and Samuel Rogers, along with his banker Douglas Kinnaird and his publisher John Murray. Then there were the women who fell in love with him: Lady Caroline Lamb, Lady Frances Webster, Lady Oxford, and his future wife Annabella Milbancke; also his confidante Lady Melbourne. A new group of friends in Switzerland included the poet Percy Bysshe Shelley, Shelley's wife Mary and sister-in-law Claire Clairmont. Members of the Shelley circle with whom Byron corresponded included Thomas Medwin, Edward Williams and his common-law wife Jane, Edward John Trelawny, and the poet Leigh Hunt. In Venice there were Byron's lover Teresa Guiccioli, her brother Gamba and husband Count Guiccioli, the British consul Richard Belgrave Hoppner, and Alexander Scott. Finally, Byron's Greek adventure brought him into contact with a new circle: the rebel leader Prince Mavrokordatos, the banker Samuel Barff, and members of the London Philhellenic Committee, including Colonel Leicester Stanhope.

== Editions ==
In 1830, 6 years after his death, about 560 of Byron's letters were published by his friend Thomas Moore under the title Letters and Journals of Lord Byron: With Notices of his Life. The next edition of the letters and journals appeared in six volumes in 1898-1901, edited by R. E. Prothero as part of a 13-volume Works. Prothero included nearly 1200 letters, conscientiously edited, though like Moore he excised all passages likely to offend 19th-century sensibilities. A collection of about 350 unpublished letters was bequeathed by John Hobhouse's daughter Lady Dorchester to John Murray, who published them as Lord Byron’s Correspondence in 1922, in two volumes, though yet again in a bowdlerized form. In 1950 Peter Quennell produced a selection of the letters, called Byron: A Self-Portrait, of which 50 letters had not up to that point been published. In 1966 the American literary scholar Leslie A. Marchand, having written a magisterial biography of Byron, began work on editing his letters. The result, Byron's Letters and Journals, appeared in 11 volumes plus an index volume between 1973 and 1982, with a final supplementary volume in 1994. He was assisted in his work by the edition's publisher, John Murray VI, grandson of the earlier editor and great-great-grandson of Byron's own publisher. Marchand's work included about 3000 letters, and it remains the reference edition. The first two volumes won the Modern Language Association's James Russell Lowell Prize for 1974, the judges calling it "an outstanding achievement in humane editing". In 1982 he followed this up with a one-volume selection of Byron's letters and journals. In 2015 Richard Lansdown published another selection, which differed from Marchand's in being about twice the size and in attempting to cover Byron's whole life rather than just picking out the best letters. Jeffery Vail called it "engrossing, moving, hilarious, and sometimes heartbreaking", and preferred it to the Marchand selection.
