= Jane Hogg =

Jane Hogg may refer to:

- Jane Williams (1798–1884), muse of Shelley, married name Jane Hogg
- Jane Hogg, character in Adventures of a Private Eye
