= Byron's Memoirs =

Unpublished 1818–1821 works by Lord Byron

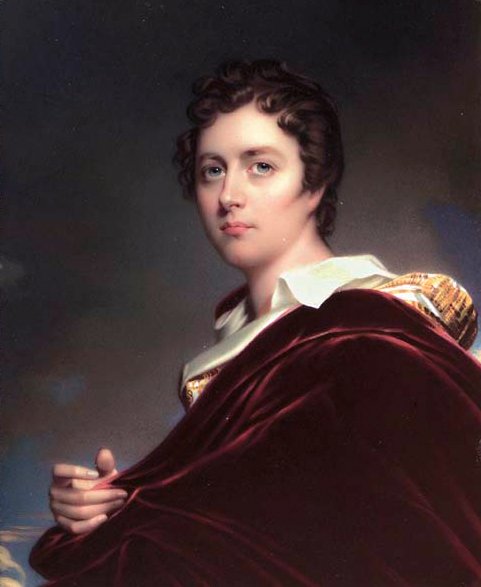
"When you read my Memoirs you will learn the evils, moral and physical, of true dissipation. I can assure you my life is very entertaining and very instructive." Lord Byron in conversation with Thomas Medwin

Byron's Memoirs, written between 1818 and 1821 but never published and destroyed soon after his death, recounted at full-length his life, loves, and opinions. He gave the manuscript to the poet Thomas Moore, who in turn sold it to John Murray with the intention that it should eventually be published. On Lord Byron's death in 1824, Moore, Murray, John Cam Hobhouse, and other friends who were concerned for his reputation gathered together and burned the original manuscript and the only known copy of it, in what has been called the greatest literary crime in history.

Since the Memoirs are lost beyond recovery, only the vaguest idea of their nature can be gathered from the mutually inconsistent testimony of those contemporaries of Byron who read them in manuscript. It is hard to judge how sexually explicit they were, some witnesses maintaining that they were perfectly fit for anyone to read and others that they were far too scabrous ever to be published.

== Composition ==
As early as 1809, while travelling in Albania with his friend John Cam Hobhouse, Byron wrote an account of his life and thoughts. Hobhouse persuaded him to destroy this document, though Byron protested that the world was being robbed of a treat.

Byron again began to consider an autobiography in 1818. On 10 July he wrote from Venice in a letter to his publisher John Murray in London,

I think of writing (for your full edition) some memoirs of my life to prefix to them – upon the same model (though far enough I fear from reaching it) as that of Gifford – Hume – &^{c} and this without any intention of making disclosures or remarks upon living people which would be unpleasant to them...I have materials in plenty - but the greater part of these could not be used by me – nor for three hundred years to come – however there is enough without these...to make you a good preface for such an edition as you meditate – but this by the way – I have not made up my mind.

On 3 August he told Murray that he had made good progress with the Memoirs, and on 26 August that they were nearly finished, but that they were now too long and too indiscreet to be publishable as a preface: "I shall keep it among my papers – it will be a kind of Guide post in case of death – and prevent some of the lies which would otherwise be told".

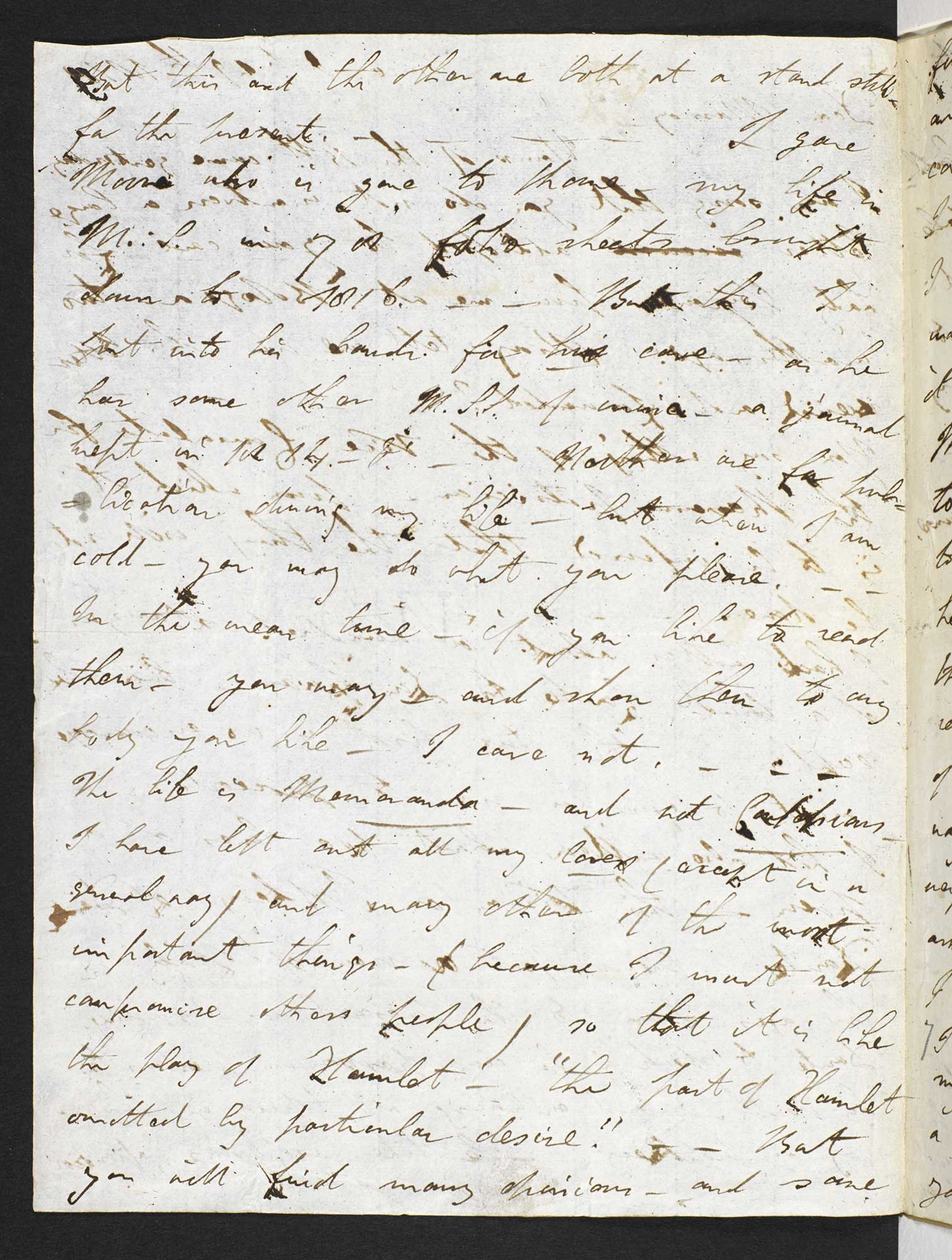
One page from Byron's letter to Murray, 29 October 1819: "I gave Moore who is gone to Rome – my Life in M.S. in 78 folio sheets brought down to 1816."

On 29 October 1819 he announced that he had given the Memoirs, which took his story as far as 1816, to his friend Thomas Moore, the poet, and repeated that they were "[not] for publication during my life – but when I am cold – you may do what you please." Moore accepted this restriction and good-humouredly looked forward to bequeathing the book to his son, "who shall astonish the latter days of the nineteenth century with it". Between 1820 and 1821 Byron added a second portion, bringing the Memoirs to a length of at least 120,000 words. The complete Memoirs, all in Moore's possession, were handed out by him to a large number of readers in the fashionable world, so many indeed that the manuscripts were in danger of falling apart from overuse, so that Moore was obliged to have a copy made. In July 1821, with Byron's blessing, Moore sold the manuscript and the copy to Murray for the enormous sum of £2100, but then Byron had second thoughts and the deal was renegotiated to give Moore and himself the power to buy back the Memoirs during Byron's lifetime. They still remained in manuscript when Byron died on 19 April 1824 at Missolonghi in Greece.

== Destruction ==
Within minutes of hearing that Byron was dead Hobhouse began to plan the destruction of the manuscripts, motivated perhaps by a feeling that all memoirs were by definition slightly improper; by fear of being associated with such a libertine as Byron, now that he himself was a respectable MP; or by resentment that they had been entrusted to Moore, Hobhouse's rival in Byron's friendship. On approaching John Murray, who he supposed might want to profit by publishing them, he found to his surprise that Murray was just as keen as himself to see them burned. Moore initially favoured buying back the manuscript from Murray and handing it over to Augusta Leigh, Byron's half-sister, for destruction, but then he changed his mind and decided instead that with the excision of all improper passages Byron's reputation would be sufficiently secured. Besides, he argued, Byron had told him that he could "show them to the elect", and since he had actually done so there could be no further harm in publishing them. A meeting was held at Hobhouse's chambers in Albany to thrash the matter out. Present were Moore, Hobhouse, Henry Luttrell (a friend of Moore's, inclined to support him whatever he decided), and John Murray. All of them were under the mistaken impression, not having actually consulted the legal documents in the case, that Moore might still have some rights in the matter, whereas in fact Byron's death had rendered the Memoirs the absolute property of John Murray, to deal with as he saw fit. Murray pointed out that William Gifford, who had read the Memoirs, was of the opinion that they would make Byron's name infamous forever. They argued so fiercely that Moore even spoke of settling the matter by fighting a duel with Murray. The meeting was then adjourned to Murray's house in Albemarle Street, where Wilmot Horton, acting for Byron's half-sister Augusta Leigh, and Colonel Francis Doyle, acting for Lady Byron, were waiting. Moore protested that to destroy the manuscript would be "contrary to Lord Byron's wishes and unjust to myself", but Hobhouse's and Murray's view of the matter finally prevailed and, with Moore's reluctant consent, the manuscript was torn up and burned in Murray's fireplace by Horton and Doyle. This has been called the greatest literary crime in history. Some 19th-century commentators believed that one or more copies of the Memoirs still survived and would one day emerge, and indeed that hope is still nurtured by a few, but the scholarly consensus is that the book is irrecoverably lost.

== Blame ==
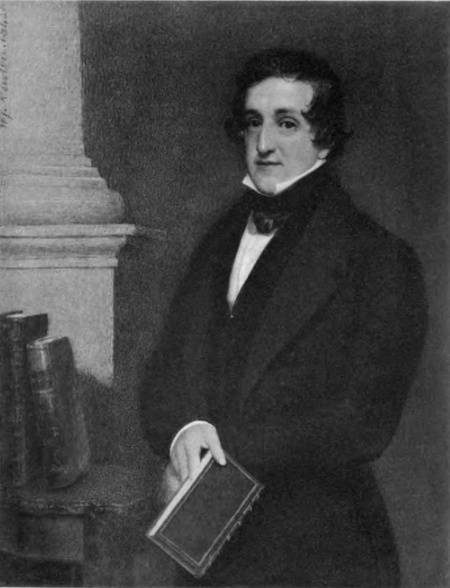
John Cam Hobhouse

Though most of those present at the Albemarle Street meeting were in favour of the destruction of the Memoirs, Moore was vehemently opposed to it until overborne by the others; yet for many years Hobhouse kept up a campaign of public sniping against Moore, throwing the blame onto him. Moore's account of the fateful meeting at Murray's house, recorded in his diary, gave a sympathetic view of his part in the story, but when that diary was published by Lord John Russell in 1853 he excised this entry, and it long remained unpublished. With only one side of the question being heard, the general feeling throughout the 19th century was that Moore was the man most responsible for the burning of the Memoirs. One note of dissent came from Moore's friend Walter Scott, who recorded in his diary his opinion that Moore had been ill-treated, but as late as 1937 Moore's biographer, L. A. G. Strong wrote, "The conclusion cannot be resisted that Moore failed his friend".

Modern scholarship assigns the blame elsewhere. Leslie A. Marchand wrote that Hobhouse was chiefly responsible, and Terence de Vere White came to the same conclusion, adding that Murray was the second most guilty man. G. Wilson Knight brought in a verdict against Hobhouse, Colonel Doyle, Wilmot Horton and Murray as being jointly responsible, with the rider that "behind it all...was Lady Byron". Paul Douglass believes that some blame must also go to Byron himself, in that he was too careless of his Memoirs' fate, and certainly Byron did allow them to fall into the hands of John Murray, whom he considered "the most timorous of God's booksellers".

== Contents ==
In the absence of any surviving manuscript of the Memoirs, the only direct evidence for the nature of their contents comes from comments by Byron himself, and by such friends of Moore, Murray, and Byron as were allowed to read it. These readers included Elizabeth Palgrave, Lady Burghersh, Lady Davy, Lord and Lady Holland, Richard Hoppner, Washington Irving, Lady Jersey, Lord Kinnaird and his brother Douglas, Henry Luttrell, Lady Mildmay, Lord Rancliffe, Lord John Russell, William Gifford, William Maginn, Lady Caroline Lamb, Mary Shelley, Percy Bysshe Shelley (probably), John William Polidori (probably), Samuel Rogers (possibly), and two copyists employed by Moore called Williams and Dumoulin. Byron offered his estranged wife the chance to read the Memoirs, but she refused to have anything to do with it.

Byron wrote to Murray about the first part of the Memoirs, which ended at the year 1816, that

The Life is Memoranda and not Confessions. I have left out all my loves (except in a general way), and many other of the most important things (because I must not compromise other people)...But you will find many opinions, and some fun, with a detailed account of my marriage and its consequences, as true as a party concerned can make such accounts, for I suppose we are all prejudiced.

His friend Thomas Medwin later reported that Byron had told him about the second part that it

will prove a good lesson to young men; for it treats of the irregular life I led at one period, and the fatal consequences of dissipation. There are few parts that may not, and none that will not, be read by women...When you read my Memoirs you will learn the evils, moral and physical, of true dissipation. I can assure you my life is very entertaining and very instructive.

Thomas Moore also drew a distinction between the two parts. The first part contained "little unfit for publication", and "on the mysterious cause of the separation [from his wife at the beginning of 1816] it afforded no light whatever"; but as for the second part, "some of its details could never have been published at all". Privately, Moore told Hobhouse that "the first part of the Memoirs contained nothing objectionable except one anecdote – namely that Lord B. had Lady B. on the sofa before dinner on the day of their marriage." On the other hand, "The second part contained all sorts of erotic adventures". When he came to write his Letters and Journals of Lord Byron: With Notices of His Life (1830), Moore silently incorporated all the incidents he could remember relating to Byron's early London life from the Memoirs, or at any rate all he considered fit to print.

The disparity between the first and second parts may help to explain the very wide range of opinions from the other witnesses. Byron's discarded lover Lady Caroline Lamb thought the Memoirs "were of no value – a mere copy-book", and Lady Burghersh is reported to have said that she found them so unobjectionable that she would have allowed her 15-year-old daughter to read them. Lord Holland thought "some of them were agreeable enough". Lord John Russell had read the greater part of the MS. His memory was that "three or four pages of it were too gross and indelicate for publication...the rest, with few exceptions, contained little traces of Lord Byron's genius, and no interesting details of his life. His early youth in Greece, and his sensibility to the scenes around him, when resting on a rock in the swimming excursions he took from the Piraeus, were strikingly described. But, on the whole, the world is no loser by the sacrifice made of the Memoirs of this great poet." Another detail comes from Samuel Rogers, who claimed to have read in the Memoirs that "on his marriage-night, Byron suddenly started out of his first sleep; a taper, which burned in the room, was casting a ruddy glare through the crimson curtains of the bed; and he could not help exclaiming, in a voice so loud that he wakened Lady B., 'Good God, I am surely in hell!'". Lord Rancliffe thought they were "of a low, pot-house description". Elizabeth Palgrave, in a letter discovered in 2024, told her father, Dawson Turner, that she "read it with the utmost interest & avidity. It is grievous to read his declaration of indifference to his wife & of aversion to her mother, whom he never mentions but by the most opprobrious epithets...All the families in the neighbourhood whom his Lordship met, are mentioned by name & classed in the wittiest but most cruel manner. Ld Byron evidently set his mind to evil - he takes delight in recording his own wickedness". William Gifford, the editor of the Quarterly Review, read the manuscript for Murray and reported to him, according to Hobhouse, that "the whole Memoirs were fit only for a brothel and would damn Lord B. to everlasting infamy if published." However, Gifford had held the same opinion of Byron's Don Juan, which was nevertheless published in Byron's lifetime.

== Legacy ==
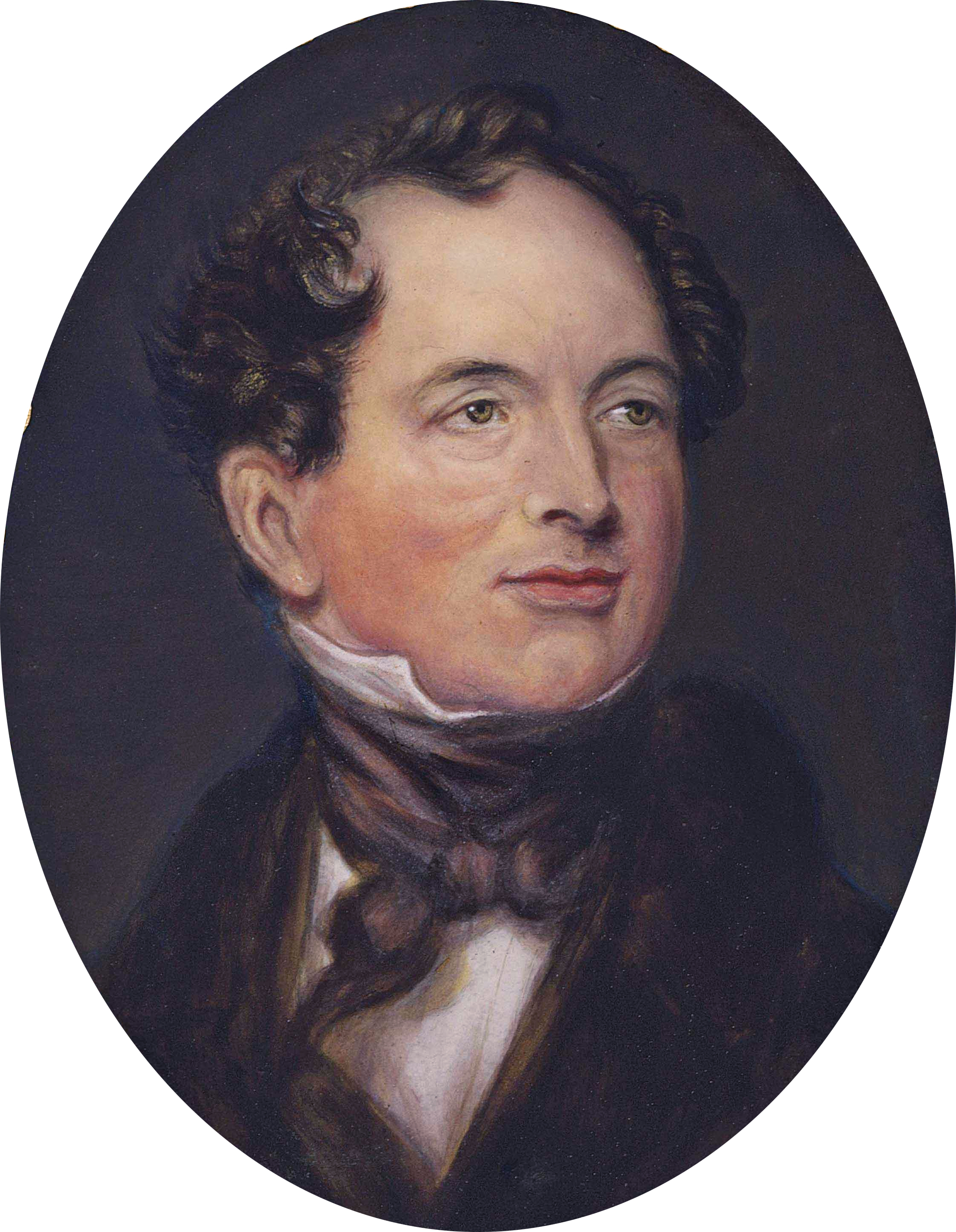
Thomas Moore

Though the Memoirs themselves were destroyed, they, and the story of their destruction, inspired a number of responses. Thomas Moore wrote, ostensibly in Venice at the time he received the manuscript from Byron, a poem describing his feelings when about to read the Memoirs. He reflects,

Let me, a moment, think what thousands live
O'er the wide earth this instant, who would give
Gladly, whole sleepless nights to bend the brow,
Over these precious leaves, as I do now.

In July 1824 the journalist Theodore Hook published what purported to be an extract from the Memoirs describing Byron's wedding night. It was certainly a forgery since it was in several respects inconsistent with what we know of Byron's marriage, but it was widely credited at the time.

In, perhaps, 1842 a poem in defence of homosexuality, called Don Leon, was published under Byron's name. The poem claimed to be "Part of the Private Journal of his Lordship, supposed to have been entirely destroyed by Thos. Moore", but its authenticity can be judged by the fact that it makes reference to events that happened after Byron's death. The date of composition, the date of first publication, and the real author's name are all shrouded in uncertainty.

Virgil Thomson's third and last opera Lord Byron (1972), to a libretto by Jack Larson, stages a fictionalized version of the return of Byron's body to England in 1824; the Memoirs accompany the body, and are in the final act burned in Westminster Abbey. The opera has achieved popularity neither in its original form nor in an early 1980s abridged version.

There followed two novels in the form of imaginative recreations of the Memoirs. The first, The Secret Memoirs of Lord Byron by Christopher Nicole (1978), was according to Kirkus Reviews characterized by "erratic wit, hearty research, and excessive palaver about matters sexual". Robert Nye's The Memoirs of Lord Byron (1989) was praised by the literary scholar Daniel S. Burt for its "remarkable impersonation of Byron's voice and psychological insight into his genius", and by Andrew Sinclair in The Times for its "cascade of epigrams tumbling one after the other".

Finally, in 1995 Tom Holland published The Vampyre, Being the True Pilgrimage of George Gordon, Sixth Lord Byron (US title: Lord of the Dead: The Secret History of Lord Byron). In this novel a search for the Memoirs results in the discovery that they were destroyed because they revealed that Byron was, and indeed is, a vampire. Patt Morrison applauded the book in the Los Angeles Times, but Kirkus Reviews wrote of its "attractive figures in living pasteboard", and would only concede that "as a genre work, this is better than many".

== Destruction of other papers ==
In addition to the destruction of the Memoirs, Henry James and John Buchan were asked by the widow of Byron's grandson to advise on papers she held concerning the quarrel between Byron and his wife. Buchan later wrote: "The thing nearly made me sick, but my colleague never turned a hair." They advised burning. According to Henry Channon, Buchan told him the papers had been "incredibly indecent – and homosexual," but that he regretted his decision.
