= The Life of Percy Bysshe Shelley =

Unfinished biography of Percy Shelly

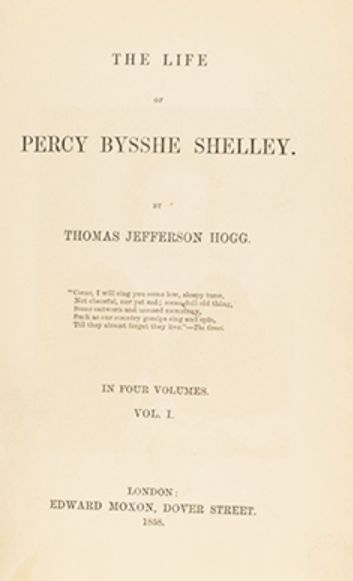
- Title page for The Life of Percy Bysshe Shelley (1858)
- Author: Thomas Jefferson Hogg
- Language: English
- Genre: Biography
- Publisher: Edward Moxon
- Publication date: 1858
- Publication place: England

The Life of Percy Bysshe Shelley is an unfinished posthumous biography of the Romantic poet Percy Bysshe Shelley that was written by his friend Thomas Jefferson Hogg. The first two of the four planned volumes were released in 1858 to largely unfavourable reviews. Though a few friends of Percy Shelley enjoyed the book, many critics attacked the book for being poorly edited and for portraying Shelley negatively. Though more volumes were planned, they were never published because of the Shelley family's objections to Hogg's treatment of him.

== Origin ==
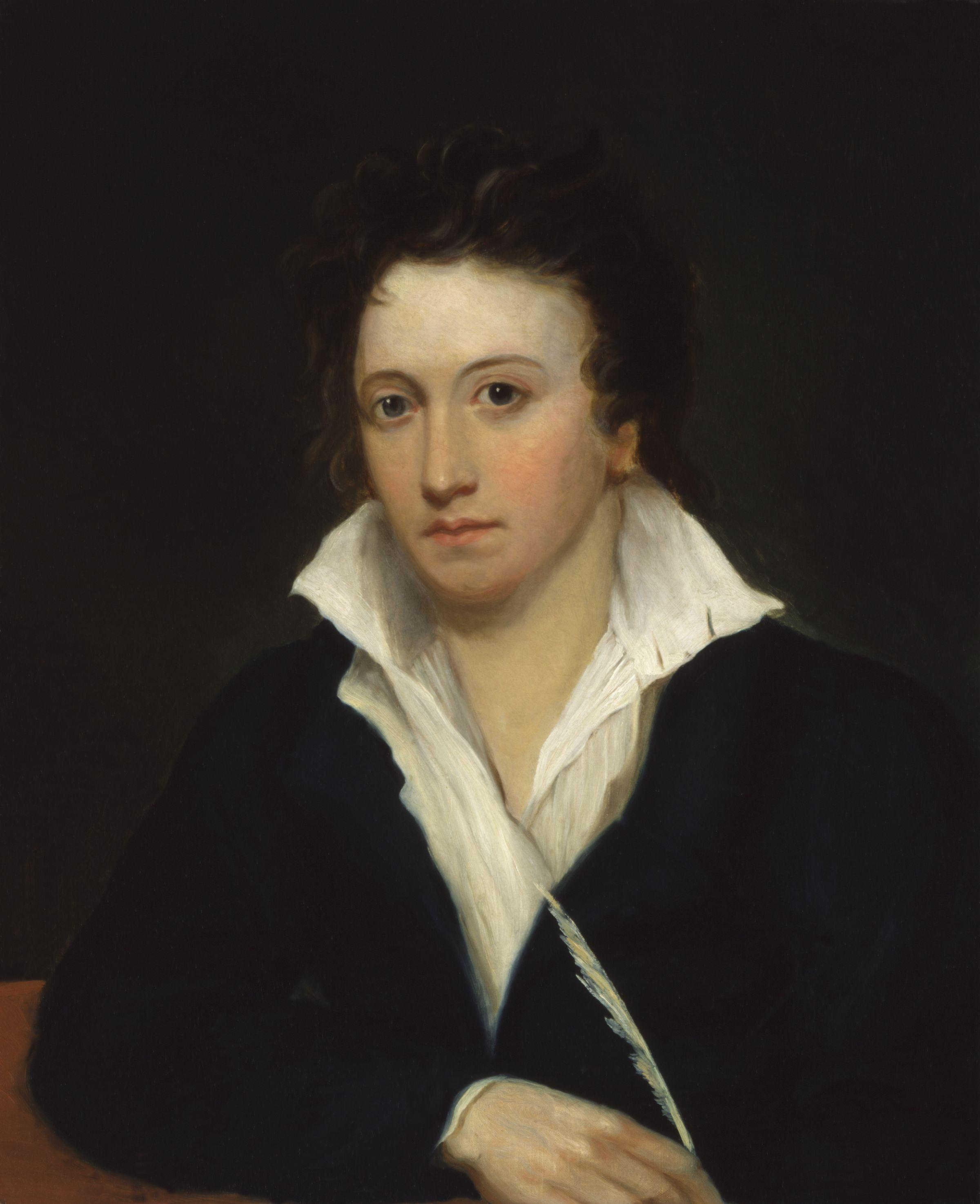
Portrait of Percy Bysshe Shelley in 1819

Hogg had previously published Shelley at Oxford in The New Monthly Magazine. This was a well-received account of the time they spent together at University College, Oxford. After he published this account, Mary Shelley suggested to him that he write a full biography of Percy Bysshe Shelley. Hogg did not begin work on a biography for years, however, and Mary died before it was completed. He finally began the project after their son Percy Florence Shelley also asked him to write a full account of his father's life. Hogg commenced work on the project in 1855.

Unlike the previous article Hogg wrote, this book covered periods of Shelley's life that Hogg had only learned about secondhand. The Shelley family helped him by providing Shelley's papers to him for use in his research. Shelley's sisters Helen and Margaret also contributed accounts of childhood memories involving their brother. Hogg was known for the strength and clarity of his memory, and was able to recall minor details from the time that he spent with Shelley. The initial plan was to release a four-volume work and the first two volumes of the book were published in 1858 by Edward Moxon. The text of Shelley at Oxford was included in the work, and comprised roughly one sixth of the final document.

== Themes ==
The book primarily discusses the activities and correspondence shared between Hogg and Shelley. It includes 44 letters that were exchanged between Hogg and Shelley in 1810 and 1811. The text of many of the letters was changed by Hogg before the book's publication. He made most of the changes to cover up his own youthful radicalism and his romantic pursuit of Percy's sister Elizabeth. The original text of many of the letters shows that Hogg was often unstable and relied on Percy Shelley for guidance. The changes that were made often misled future biographers, although Hogg did preserve the originals as well.

Hogg did not express much admiration for Shelley's poetry in the book. Many readers inferred from his description of Shelley that Hogg viewed him as a lady's man who was often irresponsible. Another irritation to many was that Hogg often boasted about himself in the book. He attempted to present himself as a sober and serious friend to an often foolish Percy Shelley. The book contained many descriptions of Shelley breaking appointments, borrowing money that he could not repay, and fabricating odd stories. Hogg did not mention the atheism that he shared with Percy Shelley, fearing the effect that this disclosure could have on his reputation. He went to great lengths in the book to portray himself as conservative and loyal to the traditions of England.

Hogg was careful not to divulge potentially embarrassing information about Shelley's living friends, however. He also failed to mention his own passion for Harriet Shelley, Percy Shelley's first wife. Harriet was portrayed very favourably in the book, although Hogg did discuss her preoccupation with suicide. Percy's father Timothy Shelley was portrayed very negatively, and the book characterized Percy Shelley as often disdainful towards his parents.

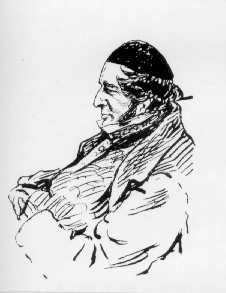
Sketch of Thomas Jefferson Hogg in 1857

== Reception ==
Soon after it was released, the book was panned by critics. One of the frequently mentioned problems with the book was that it lacked the extensive editing that his previous article about Shelley had been given. Critics viewed his larger work as often digressive and full of tangents, and some lamented the significant amount of space that Hogg devoted to describing the meals that they ate together. Others pointed out that the book did not contain the novel insights about Shelley and his poetry that Shelley at Oxford had delivered. Shelley's family was surprised to read the depictions of the young Percy Shelley and some of the accounts greatly upset them.

A few of Mary Shelley's friends and relatives believed that the positive description of Harriet caused Mary to look bad for drawing Percy Shelley away from her. Leigh Hunt was particularly critical of the book, but some have suggested that his critical tone may have been because of his portrayal in the book. Edward John Trelawny, however, spoke very positively of the book. Thomas Love Peacock also enjoyed the book, but thought it should have been described as Hogg's autobiography. Some other commentators have noted that the book does portray Shelley as a very likeable person.

After reading the first two volumes, the Shelley family asked Hogg to provide them with his next volumes for pre-release editing. Hogg declined, however, and they revoked the documents about Percy Shelley that they granted to him for his research. Though Hogg had already started writing a third volume, it is generally believed that he never completed the work. Some have speculated that a manuscript of the last two volumes was completed but never discovered.

== Bibliography ==
- Cameron, Kenneth Neill (1961), "Hogg's Censorship of Shelley's Letters", Shelley and His Circle, vol. 2, London: Oxford University Press, p. 1020
- Garnett, Richard (1891). "Hogg, Thomas Jefferson" . In Lee, Sidney (ed.). Dictionary of National Biography. Vol. 27. London: Smith, Elder & Co. p. 104.
- Ainsworth, William Harrison, ed. (1858), "Hogg's Life of Shelley", The New Monthly Magazine, vol. 113, London: Chapman and Hall, p. 500
- Salt, Henry Stephens (1889), An examination of Hogg's "Life of Shelley", London: Richard Clay and Sons, p. 24
- Norman, Sylva (1934), Norman, Sylva (ed.), After Shelley: The Letters of Thomas Jefferson Hogg to Jane Williams, London: Oxford University Press
- Rees, Joan (1985), Shelley's Jane Williams, London: William Kimber, p. 226, ISBN 978-0-7183-0549-9
- Scott, Winifred (1951), Jefferson Hogg: Shelley's Biographer, London: Jonathan Cape, p. 286
