= Thomas Medwin =

English writer, poet and translator (1788–1869)

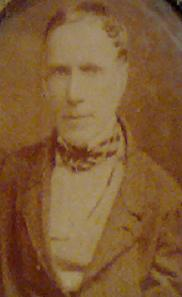
- Born: 20 March 1788; Horsham, Sussex, England
- Died: 2 August 1869 (aged 81); Horsham, Sussex, England
- Resting place: St. Mary's Churchyard, Horsham
- Education: Syon House, Cambridge University
- Occupations: Poet; biographer; novelist; translator
- Writing career
- Notable works: Journal of the conversations of Lord Byron (1824), The Agamemnon of Aeschylus, translated into English verse 1832, The life of P. B. Shelley 2 vols. (1847)
- Movement: Romanticism

Thomas Medwin (20 March 1788 – 2 August 1869) was an early 19th-century English writer, poet and translator. He is primarily known for his controversial biography of his cousin, Percy Bysshe Shelley, and for published recollections of his friend, Lord Byron.

== Early life ==
Thomas Medwin was born in the market town of Horsham, West Sussex on 20 March 1788, the third son of five children of Thomas Charles Medwin, a solicitor and steward, and Mary Medwin (née Pilfold). His two older brothers John and Henry died in early adulthood. He was a second cousin on both his parents' sides to Percy Bysshe Shelley (1792–1822), who lived two miles away at Field Place, Warnham, and with whom Medwin formed a friendship from childhood onwards meeting in their respective holidays for pursuits such as fishing and fox-hunting.

Medwin was from a prosperous rather than a wealthy family that expected their sons to work for a living. He attended Syon House Academy in Brentford in 1798–1804, as did Shelley in 1802–1804. Medwin related that Shelley and he remained close friends at Syon House, forming a bond so close that Shelley apparently sleepwalked his way to Medwin's dormitory. After a further year in a public school, Medwin matriculated at University College, Oxford in the winter of 1805, but left without taking his degree. He was initially articled as a clerk in his father's law firm in Horsham but had no wish to be a provincial lawyer preferring to spend time on more aristocratic pursuits often with his cousin Shelley. Their romantic attachments included their cousin Harriet Grove, with whom Shelley was deeply committed by the spring of 1810. Their relationship was brief and ended by Grove's parents A year later Shelley eloped and married sixteen year old Harriet Westbrook using money he had borrowed under false pretences from Medwin senior.

Medwin was a polyglot fluent in: Greek, Latin, German, Italian, Spanish, French and Portuguese and interested in pursuing a literary life. He began writing poems, including a contribution to The Wandering Jew, a poem attributed to the youthful Shelley. He also ran up considerable gambling debts at his club in Brighton that caused a rift with his father, the result of which was the omission of Thomas from his father's will, executed in 1829. Considerable debts appear to have been paid by his family. He had also spent substantial sums on collecting art. Shelley later recalled Medwin as painting well and ”remarkable, if I do not mistake, for a particular taste in, and knowledge of the belli arti – Italy is the place for you, the very place – the Paradise of Exiles.... If you will be glad to see an old friend, who will be glad to see you... come to Italy.” Medwin's financial situation was such that initially he could not accept his cousin's invitation, and by 1812 he had accepted a military commission in the 24th Light Dragoons, a regiment where he could pursue his social pretensions.

== India ==
Medwin was gazetted as a cornet in June 1812, progressing to the rank of lieutenant in the 24th Dragoon guards in 1813. His regiment was stationed at Cawnpore in Uttar Pradesh in northern India, one of the largest military stations in India, with an organised social life and stores stocked with European goods. The heat was stultifying and few duties were required of an officer. Judging from Medwin's description, he spent many enthusiastic hours hunting wildlife. He saw action at the siege of Hathras in 1817 and was involved in advances against the Pindaris on the banks of the river Sindh in December 1817. Medwin spent five years in India that included an intense affair with a Hindu woman that ended badly but through whom he was introduced to the doctrines of Raja Ram Mohan Roy. He also witnessed an incident of sati, the ritual burning of a widow, on the Narmuda river in 1818. and enthusiastically toured the classical Hindu temples of Gaur, Palibothra, Jagannath and Karla and the Elephanta and Ellora Caves. Medwin's regiment was disbanded at the end of 1818 and Medwin went on half-pay, attached to a regiment of the Life Guards until 1831, when he sold his commission. He was by this time known as Captain Medwin, although there is no evidence that he was ever promoted beyond the rank of lieutenant.

In October 1818 whilst waiting in Bombay for a berth back to England, he browsed a bookstall finding a copy of The Revolt of Islam by his cousin Shelley. Recalling the incident under his persona Julian in The Angler in Wales in 1834, he was “astonished at the greatness of (Shelley's) genius” and declared, “that the amiable philosophy and self-sacrifice inculcated by that divine poem, worked a strange reformation in my mind.” Medwin's sobriquet Julian is likely to have been a reference to Shelley's Julian and Maddalo, a poem in which Julian has characteristics of Shelley. Shelley was to provide the central experience and focal point of his future literary life.

== Reunion with Shelley ==
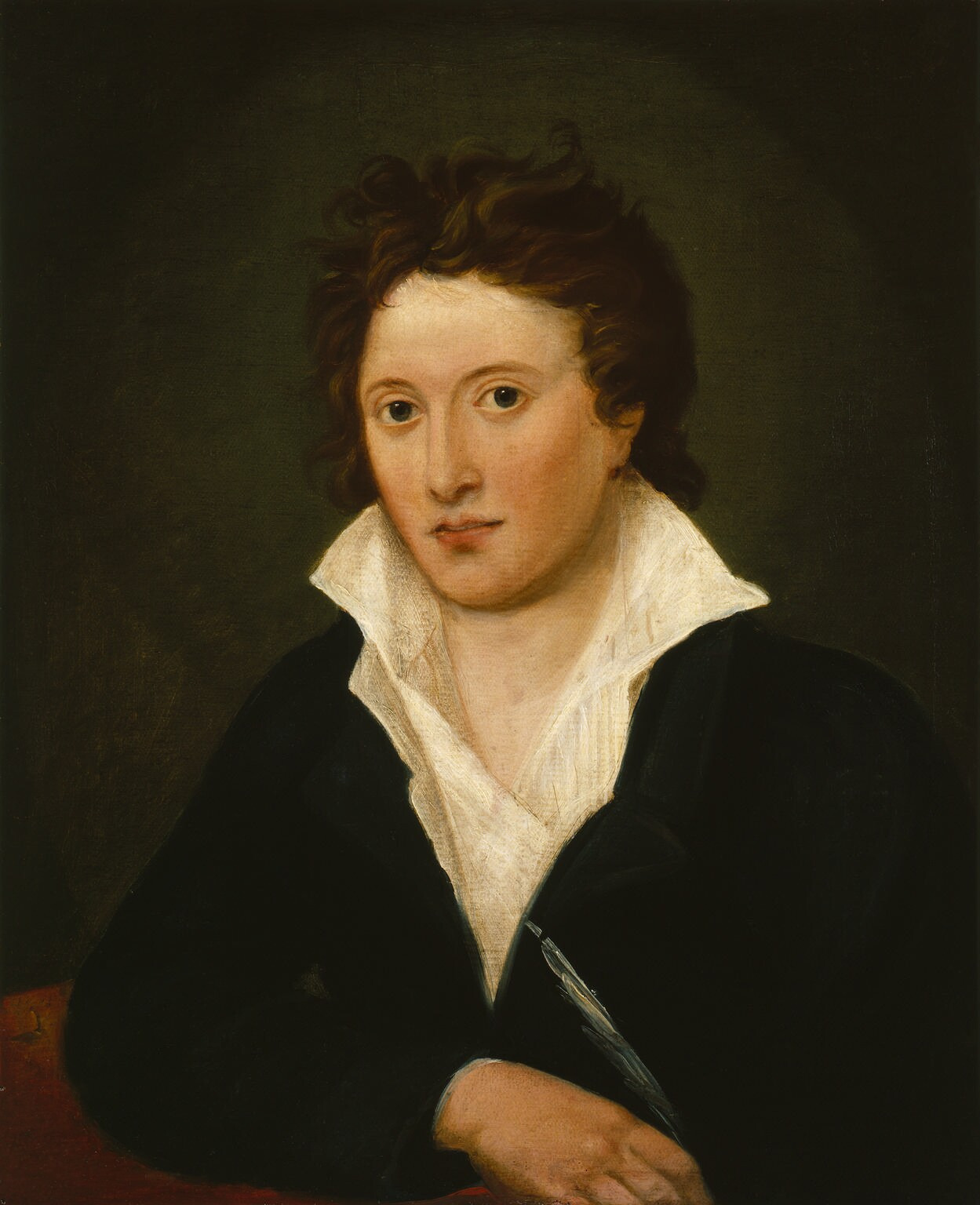
Percy Shelley

In September 1820 he arrived in Geneva to stay with Jane and Edward Ellerker Williams, the latter of whom was to drown with Shelley. There he finished his first published poem, Oswald and Edwin, An Oriental Sketch, dedicated to Williams. This ran to 40 pages with 12 pages of notes. It was revised in 1821 as the Lion Hunt for Sketches From Hindoostan. Following his return from India, Medwin revived his friendship with Shelley inspiring his cousin with his recollections of India as they engaged in a creative exchange of ideas and criticism. In the autumn of 1820, Medwin joined his cousin Shelley in Pisa, moving in with him and his wife Mary Shelley, with whom he was to develop an uneasy relationship. Mary could not stand Medwin's nagging presence, and found him extremely boring,”The burden of Tom grows very heavy!” Medwin was periodically ill with a recurring hepatic ailment, during his months in Pisa but worked with Shelley on a number of poems and on the publication of his journal Sketches From Hindoostan. Shelley and Medwin started to study Arabic together; they also read Schiller, Cervantes, Milton and Petrarch, and throughout early 1821 pursued a vigorous intellectual life. Shelley was working on Prometheus and would read drafts each evening to Medwin, who was continuing with a second volume of Oswald and Edwin, An Oriental Sketch. In January they were joined by Jane and Edward Ellerker Williams. Medwin left Shelley in March 1821 to visit Florence, Rome and then Venice, where he continued to write and socialise.

== Meeting with Byron ==
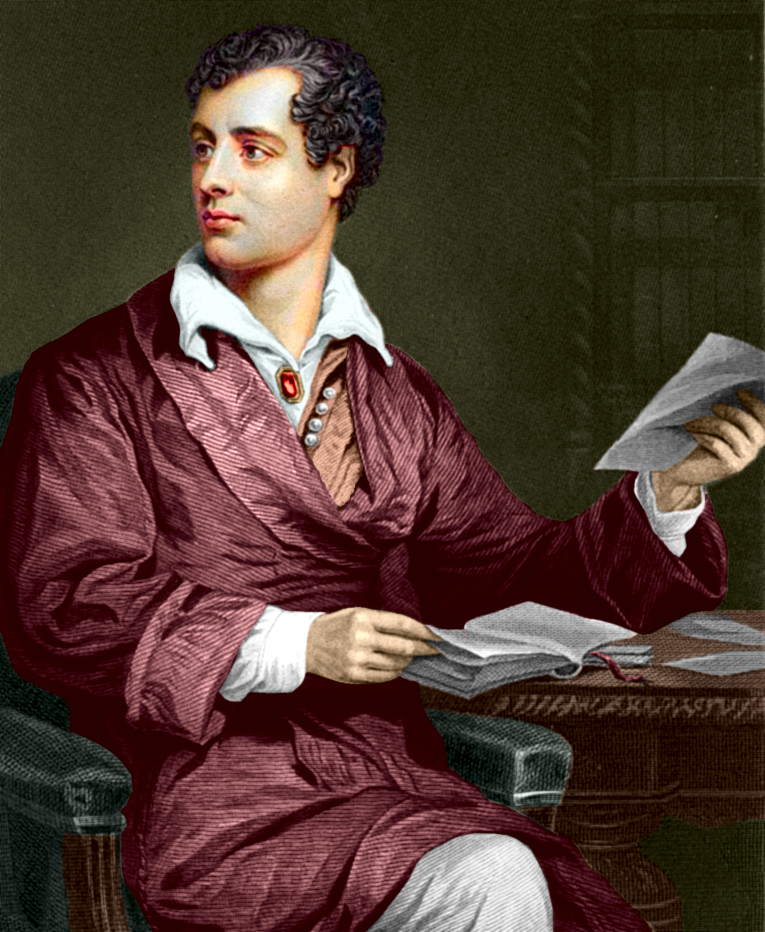
Byron

In November 1821 Medwin returned to Pisa, where Shelley introduced him to Lord Byron on 20 November 1821. Byron and Medwin were to form a friendship. They enjoyed the company of various women, as can be seen by their correspondence with each other, and formed a male bond that was missing from Medwin's relationship with Shelley. He joined Byron for episodes of pistol shooting and riding and dined within Byron's inner circle with other friends that included: Shelley, Edward E Williams, Leigh Hunt and the recently arrived Edward John Trelawny. The last would feature as friend and rival throughout Medwin's life, as both sought to be arbiters of Byron's reputation. Medwin provided a translation of part of Petrarch's Africa for Byron, whilst Byron finished Cantos 6–12 of Don Juan. When Medwin decided to continue his tour of Italy in April 1822, Byron insisted on holding a splendid leaving party for him.

== Death of Shelley ==
Medwin travelled first to Rome, where he was introduced to the sculptor Antonio Canova, and then to Naples, before sailing to Genoa. It was at Genoa that he heard a rumour of an English schooner being lost with two Englishman aboard, but only on his arrival in Geneva did he learn that it was Shelley and Edward Williams, who had drowned on 8 July 1822. Medwin was devastated and returned to Italy, where he learned at Spezia that his friends' bodies had been thrown up out of the sea. He arrived in Pisa on 18 August, a few hours after the bodies had been cremated. Throughout the rest of his life, he was bitter about being late, even claiming at one time that he had been present. He met the widows and his friends Byron, Trelawny and Leigh Hunt, who were present at Shelley's cremation, and he put the sadness of those days into Ahasuerus, The Wanderer, a poetic tale of an individual condemned to immortality and earthly solitude. The preface begins with a poetic tribute, dedicated to Byron and laid at the feet of the dead Shelley. A melancholic Medwin left Pisa shortly after to visit Genoa, Geneva, Paris, where his spirits appear to have improved by an introduction to Thomas Moore and Thomas Colley Grattan and finally London.

== Controversy over Byron ==
The restless Medwin moved to Paris in 1824, where he met Washington Irving, an American author who shared his enthusiasm for Byron and the Spanish poets, particularly Calderón. A lasting correspondence was formed. Shortly afterwards Medwin learned of the death of Lord Byron on 19 April 1824. The news was published in London on 15 May, and by 10 July Medwin had compiled a volume, his Conversations of Lord Byron The manuscript received short shrift from Mary Shelley and from the majority of critics. John Galt and William Harness published negative appraisals in the November Blackwood's Magazine, and John Cam Hobhouse, a close friend of Byron wrote a withering assault on Medwin for the Westminster Review of January 1825, questioning the truth of much of the book's contents. Lady Caroline Lamb, one of Byron's mistresses, was deeply upset by Medwin's comments and wrote him letters putting her view of their affair to him. John Murray (1778–1843), the Scottish publisher whose family house owned the copyright to Byron's works, was also outraged at the revelations and threatened to sue. (Murray had destroyed Byron's memoirs as being unfit for publication).

However supporters of Medwin's book included several eminent writers, including Sir Samuel Egerton Brydges, who incorporated, a memoir of Shelley by Medwin, into his edition of Edward Phillip's Theatrum Petarum Anglicanorum. Leigh Hunt, as might be expected, took a more tolerant view of Medwin's memoir in Lord Byron and his Contemporaries (1827), and since the publication of Byron's letters in Thomas Moore's biography(1830/31) and Lady Blessington's Conversations (1832–1833), Medwin's recollections of Byron have come to be seen as essentially a true portrayal, albeit lacking in accurate details. There were at least twelve impressions in the United States, and it was enthusiastically received in Germany, France and Italy. Captain Medwin was by then famous (or infamous), well-off, and able to marry Anne Henrietta Hamilton, Countess of Starnford (a Swedish title), on 2 November 1824 in Lausanne.

== High life and downfall ==
Medwin was thirty-six when he married and took a long honeymoon at Vevey before settling in Florence. The union produced two daughters, Henrietta and Catherine. (Note: Henrietta Medwin married an Italian aristocrat, Ferdinando Pieri Nerli, and their son, born in 1860, became known as G. P. Nerli, an artist working in the Antipodes who notably painted Robert Louis Stevenson. His other daughter Catherine also married an Italian aristocrat, Cavaliere Enca Arrighi.) Medwin settled into a life of style and substance amongst an English émigré community. Unfortunately he was still living beyond his means and lost large sums buying and selling Italian art works. By 1829, when his father died, he was in dire financial straits, with creditors repossessing his goods. His marriage came under strain, and Medwin abandoned his wife and two daughters, leaving friends such as Trelawny and Charles Armitage Brown to sort out his and his wife's affairs. Many of his debts were subsequently paid off by his brother Pilford Medwin.

Medwin moved to Genoa, where he worked assiduously on a play, Prometheus portatore del fuoco (Prometheus the Fire-Bearer). Though never published in English, it was translated into Italian and published in Genoa in 1830, where it was reviewed enthusiastically. In typical fashion, Medwin dedicated the play to the memory of Shelley. Genoa, however, turned out to be only an interlude, as Medwin was expelled for writing a tragedy called The Conspiracy of the Fieschi, which alarmed the Genoese authorities, believing it to be anti-government propaganda. By January 1831 Medwin was back in London, still hoping to earn a living as a writer.

== Translating Aeschylus ==
In 1832 his Memoir of Shelley was published in six weekly instalments in The Athenaeum, with the Shelley Papers following at 18 weekly intervals until April 1833. These were collected in 1833 and published as The Shelley Papers; Memoir of Percy Bysshe Shelley. By that time Medwin was editor of the New Anti-Jacobin: A Monthly Magazine of Politics, Commerce, Science, Art, Music and the Drama, a conservative monthly journal, that ran for just two issues with contributions from Medwin, the poet Horace Smith and John Poole.

Medwin had also embarked on well-received translations of Aeschylus' plays into English. His translations are influenced by the German dramatic theorist August Wilhelm Schlegel and attempt to convey Schlegel's depiction of Prometheus as, “the representation of constancy under suffering”. Prometheus bound the translation of which Medwin had worked upon with Shelley, is widely regarded as an outstanding piece of collobaration now celebrated for its dramatic power, was first published in 1827 and reprinted in Fraser's Magazine in 1832, A series of translations followed: The Choephori, The Persians, The Seven Against Thebes, and The Eumenides, translation from Aeschylus which appeared 1834 Lastly published in November 1838 was Agamemnon. He did not translate The Suppliants, apparently because he disapproved of "its corruptions". In contrast to the vexatious criticism of Conversations with Lord Byron Medwin's translations of Aeschylus' tragedies were acclaimed. The Athenaeum was fulsome stating in their opening sentence of their review that Medwin's translation,”stands alone in it's naked majesty unapproached and unapproachable - a gigantic conception filling the mind with wonder and awe.” There was criticism that Medwin had strayed too far from the original meaning, in favour of dramatic intent, a criticism that Medwin appears to accept in the preface to Prometheus Bound.

Medwin's output in the middle years of the 1830s was extensive. He contributed a series of short stories to Bentley's Miscellany a periodical founded in 1837 initially edited by Charles Dickens. He departed from his usual classical fare in The Angler in Wales or Days and Nights of Sportsmen, paying homage to the tradition of Isaac Walton's The Compleat Angler. The publisher Richard Bentley contributed seventeen illustrations but decided that the submitted manuscript was not long enough for two volumes. This caused some tension between Medwin and Bentley, as Medwin's funds were sparse. As a consequence additional material was added in the form of an appendix, made up of quotations from such works as Jan Swammerdam's Ephemeri vita, a treatise on the mayfly. The second volume was padded by a revised version of Medwin's Pidararees now called Julian and Giselle. Medwin's health was poor at this time as can be seen from correspondence with an unsympathetic Bentley now in the New York Public Library. In 1837, after a period in Devon to recuperate from illness, Medwin announced that he was moving to Heidelberg, in the Grand Duchy of Baden, Germany.

== Heidelberg ==
In Heidelberg Medwin regularly published articles for a number of journals and newspapers notably The Athenaeum and Ainsworth's Magazine. He acted the role of a foreign correspondent with selections associated with former periods of his life: India, Rome, Switzerland, Paris, Venice, Florence and later Jena, Mannheim and Strasbourg. He became a de facto correspondent for many British readers providing insights into German society and culture. A gregarious man he quickly settled into the cultural life of Heidelberg participated in the city's literary life critiquing German theatre for English readers. He read and translated into English the works of German poets, including: Karl Gutzkow, Ludwig Tieck, Ludwig Achim von Arnim, Annette von Droste-Hülshoff, Rauch and Diefenbach. There is a dearth of sources for this period of Medwin's career but evidently he was responsible for introducing several German poets to English-speaking readers, as part of a cultural cross-fertilisation between England and Germany. He lived in Heidelberg for most of the next twenty years, although travelling regularly to Baden-Baden, the setting for his only novel, Lady Singleton, Or The World As It Is, published in 1843. In the genre of the silver-fork novel, popular in the 1840s, it is an attempt to adumbrate the mercenary nature of some upper class marriages and the deleterious harm caused by England's strict divorce laws, it had first appeared in serialised embryonic form in Fraser's Magazine as The Sacrifice; or, the Country, Town, and the Continent.

Quite possibly Medwin was writing from a personal point of view, as he had formed a deep attachment to the poet Caroline Champion de Crespigny (1797–1861), (Note: Sources differ for the birth and death dates of de Crespigny. There is a baptismal record in the register of Durham Cathedral dated 24 October 1797, whilst Probate records of 28 February 1862 record her death in Heidelberg on 26 December 1861, letters of administration having been granted to her son Albert Henry.) (Note: Caroline Bathurst was the daughter of Henry Bathurst, Bishop of Norwich and niece of Allen Bathurst, 1st Earl Bathurst. In 1820 she married Heaton Champion de Crespigny, an ultimately unsuccessful union that produced at least five children, but had ended by 1837 with her husband pursued by creditors. She settled in Heidelberg shortly thereafter.) Their relationship was essentially intellectual, as neither could afford a divorce settlement from their estranged spouses. The English colony in Heidelberg was intimate. Medwin's acquaintances there included Mary and William Howitt, who found him “a man of culture and refinement, aristocratic in his tastes”, whilst Charles Godfrey Leland, an American folklorist who befriended Medwin in Heidelberg, describes Medwin as “a kindly man, full of anecdotes, which I now wish that I had recorded”. In the early 1840s Lady Fanny Brawne Lindon, John Keats's former fiancée and literary muse, moved to Heidelberg with her husband, and through her Medwin was involved once again a conduit in a controversy concerning a dead, but highly influential English Romantic poet. Medwin and Lady Lindon collaborated to correct the allegation provided by Mary Shelley in her Essays, Letters from Abroad, Translations and Fragments (1840) that Keats had become insane in his final days. Lady Lindon showed Medwin letters that suggested otherwise. Medwin used this new information in his Life of Shelley, where he published extracts from letters by Keats and his friend Joseph Severn.

== Life of Shelley ==
Medwin began preparing his biography of Percy Shelley in 1845, corresponding with relatives and friends in England, including Percy Florence Shelley, the poet's son, and in 1846 he requested information from Mary Shelley. She was uncooperative, wishing to hinder publication of the biography, as she was concerned about Shelley's reputation. She claimed that Medwin had attempted to bribe her with the sum of £250 which Medwin denied. The work took two years to finish, appearing in September 1847. It was not a coolly dispassionate account of Shelley's life. It is passionate and opinionated, and includes attacks on Medwin's personal enemies. There are numerous errors of date, fact and quotation, some of the later outright bowdlerised. (Note: Most of the errors were removed by the editor and antiquarian Harry Buxton Forman in 1913. Further information on Buxton Forman in John Carter and Graham Pollard 's An Enquiry into the Nature of Certain Nineteenth Century Pamphlets.) However, it remains an important wellspring for the poet's early life and work. Medwin is the main authority on the childhood of Shelley, a contemporary fountainhead for the events of 1821–1822, and a mine of personal recollections. It was also the primary source of knowledge in Germany on the life and work of Shelley, who since his death had become something of a divisive figure. Criticism was to be expected and Medwin's biography received a scathing summary in The Athenaeum, which opened its review: “We are not in any way satisfied with this book”. The Spectator wrote “Medwin's labours... are chiefly remarkable for the art of stuffing... nor does the author forget a scandal when he can pick any up.” Medwin also received short shrift from the surviving members of the Pisan circle. Mary Shelley's reaction was to be expected, given her antipathy towards him, but Trelawny was equally cutting, calling the work “superficial” as late as 1870. However, it was received better by some critics, including William Howitt and W. Harrison Ainsworth, who began their review in Howitt's Journal by saying the subject “could not possibly have fallen into more competent hands.”

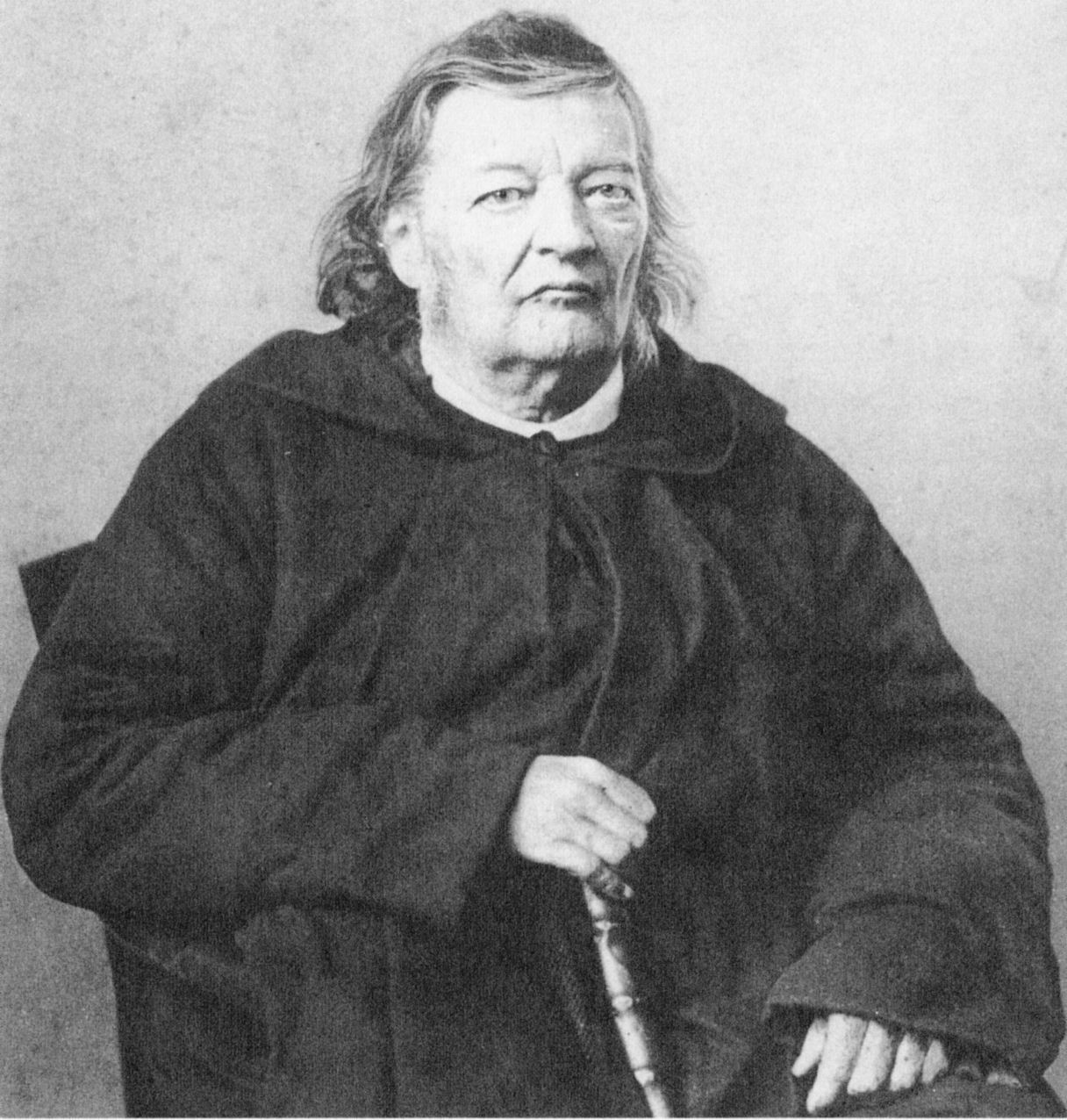
Justinus Kerner in old age

Medwin returned to Heidelberg from a visit to London and Horsham in time for the 1848 Revolution that swept through Germany. He and Caroline de Crespigny took flight to a more peaceable Weinsberg in Wurttemberg. He continued to work there, producing some poetry and translations for his host, Justinus Kerner, to whom in 1854 he published a poem. He returned to Heidelberg the same year and published a further poetry volume, The Nugae. This was international in content, with original poems and translations in Greek, Latin, English, and German. A further book of poetry published in 1862 in Heidelberg was entitled Odds and Ends, with translations from Catullus, Virgil, Horace and Scaliger, and additional poems by Caroline de Crespigny, who died shortly before its publication. The critical interest in these publications beyond Heidelberg was virtually non-existence. Indeed Odds and Ends is believed to have been a limited run of just 90 copies.

== Final years ==
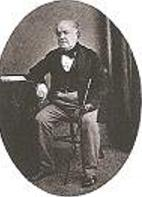
Pilford Medwin

Medwin returned finally to England in 1865 and began rewriting his "Life of Shelley", although the revision exists only in handwritten form. In 1869 he was visited by his old friend and sometime rival Trelawny, who found him constant and "always faithful and honest in his love of Shelley." Thomas Medwin died on 2 August 1869 at the house of his brother Pilfold Medwin (1794–1880) in the Carfax, Horsham. He was buried in St Mary's Denne Road Cemetery. At his request, his grave faces east to India, Italy and Germany, and reads: He was a friend and companion of Byron, Shelley and Trelawny.

== Legacy ==
Thomas Medwin's legacy tends to raise more questions than answers. His writings on Byron and Shelley are often imprecise and factually wayward . He had a tendency to fall out with former associates, including Shelley's widow and Trelawny who regarded his testimony as unreliable at best and he avoided his responsibilities to his family whom he abandoned and left in penury. In his home country his reputation was tarnished, a situation that persisted until the end of the nineteenth century. Nevertheless, Medwin remains the main source of information on Shelley's childhood and early adult life. His Conversations of Lord Byron is now generally recognised as an essentially true picture of the man.

The few writers to highlight Medwin concentrate on his popular writings on Shelley and Byron, but his legacy includes numerous translations from Greek, Latin, Italian, German, Portuguese and Spanish. His translations of Aeschylus are still well regarded and his recollections of India are particularly valuable as they focus on the imagery, symbolism and philosophy that Shelley, in particular, found inspiring. His work Ahaseurus, The Wanderer was lauded by Washington Irving, who records in his journal that the work, contained ”many beautiful passages” but for the most part, his poetry is characterised by its combination of romanticism, exotic vistas and a derivative imitation of his more gifted peers. Much of his later work is lost in prolixity and superficiality. In reality there has been little critical analysis of his work since publication and then, usually with reference to Byron and Shelley. His importance in the mid-19th-century cultural cross-currents between Britain, the United States and Germany has only recently been assessed. Medwin introduced many German writers to the English-speaking world, notably the poets Karl Gutzkow, Ludwig Tieck, Ferdinand Freiligrath and Ludwig Achim von Arnim, some with whom he corresponded. ”He deserves to be reassessed in the light of the new evidence that is now available.”

== Selected bibliography ==
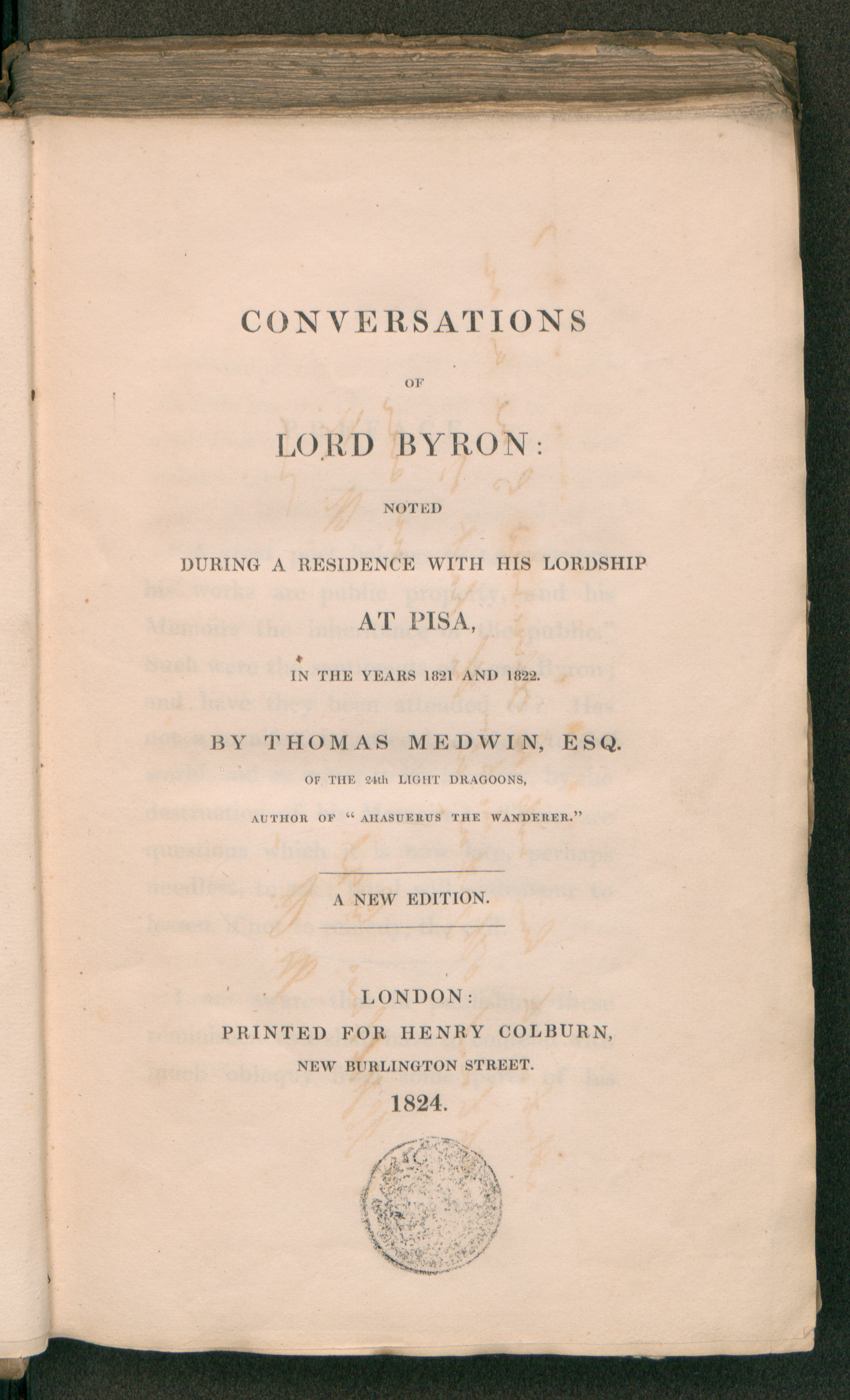
Conversation of Lord Byron, 1824

- Oswald and Edwin, an Oriental Sketch (Geneva 1821)
- Sketches in Hindoostan with Other Poems (London 1821)
- Ahasuerus, The Wanderer; Dramatic Legend in Six Parts (London 1823)
- The Death of Mago translated from Petrarch's Africa; in Ugo Foscolo, Essays on Petrarch (London 1823) pp. 215 and 217
- Journal of the Conversations of Lord Byron (Noted during a residence with his Lordship at Pisa, in the Years 1821 and 1822, London, 1824)
- Prometheus Bound (translated from Aeschylus), Siena 1927; London 1832; Fraser's Magazine XVI (August 1837), pp. 209–233
- Agamemnon (translated from Aeschylus), London 1832; Fraser's Magazine XVIII (November 1838), pp. 505–539
- The Choephori (translated from Aeschylus), Fraser's Magazine VI, (London 1832), pp. 511–535
- The Shelley Papers, Memoirs of Percy Bysshe Shelley (London, 1833)
- The Persians (translated from Aeschylus), Fraser's Magazine VII (January 1833) pp. 17–43
- The Seven Against Thebes (translated from Aeschylus), Fraser's Magazine VII (April 1833) pp. 437–458
- The Eumenides (translated from Aeschylus), Fraser's Magazine IX (May 1834) pp. 553–573.
- The Angler in Wales, or Days and Nights of Sportsmen (London 1834)
- The apportionment of the world, from Schiller, translated by Thomas Medwin, Bentley's Miscellany IV p. 549 (December 1837)
- The Three Sisters. A Romance of Real Life, Bentley's Miscellany III (January 1838)
- The Two Sisters, Bentley's Miscellany III (March 1838)
- Canova: Leaves from the Autiobiography of an Amateur, Frasers Magazine XX (September 1839)
- My Moustache, Ainsworth's Magazine, I, pp. 52–54 (1842)
- A Day in Strasburg, Ainsworth's Magazine, III 226-229 (1843)
- A German Sunday, Ainsworth's Magazine, IV 317 -322 (1843)
- Lady Singleton, or, The world as it is, Cunningham and Mortimer (London, 1843)
- The Life of Percy Bysshe Shelley (London 1847)
- Oscar and Gianetta: From the German of a Sonnetten Kranz, by Louis von Ploennies The New Monthly Magazine XCI (March 1851) pp. pp. 360–361
- To Justinus Kerner: With a Painted Wreath of Bay-Leaves, The New Monthly Magazine XCI (November 1854) p. 196
- Nugae (Heidelberg, 1856), edited by Medwin and including his own poems.
- Odds and Ends (Heidelberg, 1862)
- The Life of Percy Bysshe Shelley (London, 1913). A new edition, edited by H. Buxton Forman

== Biographies ==
- Lovell Jr, Ernest J (1962). Captain Medwin: Friend of Byron and Shelley. University of Texas.
- Jeremy Knight, Susan Cabell Djabri (1995). Horsham's Forgotten Son: Thomas Medwin, Friend of Shelley and Byron. Horsham District Council, Horsham Museum.
