= Thomas Jefferson Hogg =

English barrister and writer (1792–1862)

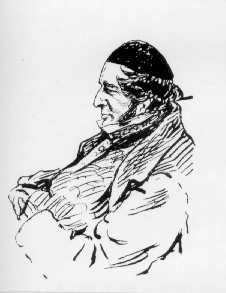
- Sketch of Thomas Jefferson Hogg in 1857
- Born: 24 May 1792; Norton, Stockton-on-Tees, County Durham
- Died: 27 August 1862 (aged 70); London, England
- Resting place: Kensal Green Cemetery
- Occupation: Barrister
- Known for: Writing about Percy Bysshe Shelley
- Partner: Jane Williams
- Children: Mary Prudentia Hogg; Sarah Jefferson Hogg
- Parent(s): John and Prudentia Hogg

Thomas Jefferson Hogg (24 May 1792 – 27 August 1862) was a British barrister and writer best known for his friendship with the Romantic poet Percy Bysshe Shelley. Hogg was raised in County Durham, but spent most of his life in London. He and Shelley became friends while studying at University College, Oxford, and remained close until Shelley's death. During their time at Oxford they collaborated on several literary projects, culminating in their joint expulsion following the publication of an essay titled "The Necessity of Atheism". They remained good friends, but their relationship was sometimes strained because of Hogg's attraction to the women who were romantically involved with Shelley.

Hogg became a barrister and met Jane Williams, who had become a close friend of Percy Shelley's shortly before the poet's death. Jane became Hogg's common-law wife and they had two children together. The family settled in London, although Hogg's legal career meant that he often had to travel away from home.

While living in London Hogg made the acquaintance of several well-known writers, and he published literary works of his own. He studied Greek literature for much of his life and published several articles on the subject, including two entries in the Encyclopædia Britannica. Most of the fiction he wrote was poorly reviewed. His best-known literary work was The Life of Percy Bysshe Shelley, an unfinished biography of the poet. Although the book was well researched and painted a clear picture of Shelley as a young man, it was criticised for portraying him negatively.

Hogg was well connected with Whig politicians. He received an appointment to a government commission on municipal corporations and became a revising barrister. His legal career was moderately successful, but he was often frustrated by his failure to attain his goal of becoming a professor or judge. Nevertheless, he was able to provide for his family thanks to an inheritance and the income from his legal career.

== Early life ==
Thomas Jefferson Hogg was the eldest of John and Prudentia (née Jones) Hogg's six children. He was given his paternal grandfather's first name and his paternal grandmother's last name. John's father was the son of a wealthy businessman and Prudentia's father was a Welsh clergyman. Although John was trained as a barrister, he did not practise law regularly. He instead devoted his time to managing his estate and serving as a justice of the peace. The family lived in a Georgian manor known as Norton House, situated 2 miles (3.2 km) outside Stockton-on-Tees.

As a young man, Hogg read many books, including Paradise Lost, Tristram Shandy and the Life of Johnson. John taught his son Greek and Latin. Every summer the family rented a house in Seaton Carew, where Hogg often hunted, fished and went horse riding. He attended a preparatory school in Ferrybridge for four years before moving to Durham School at the age of 12, which his father and grandfather had also attended.

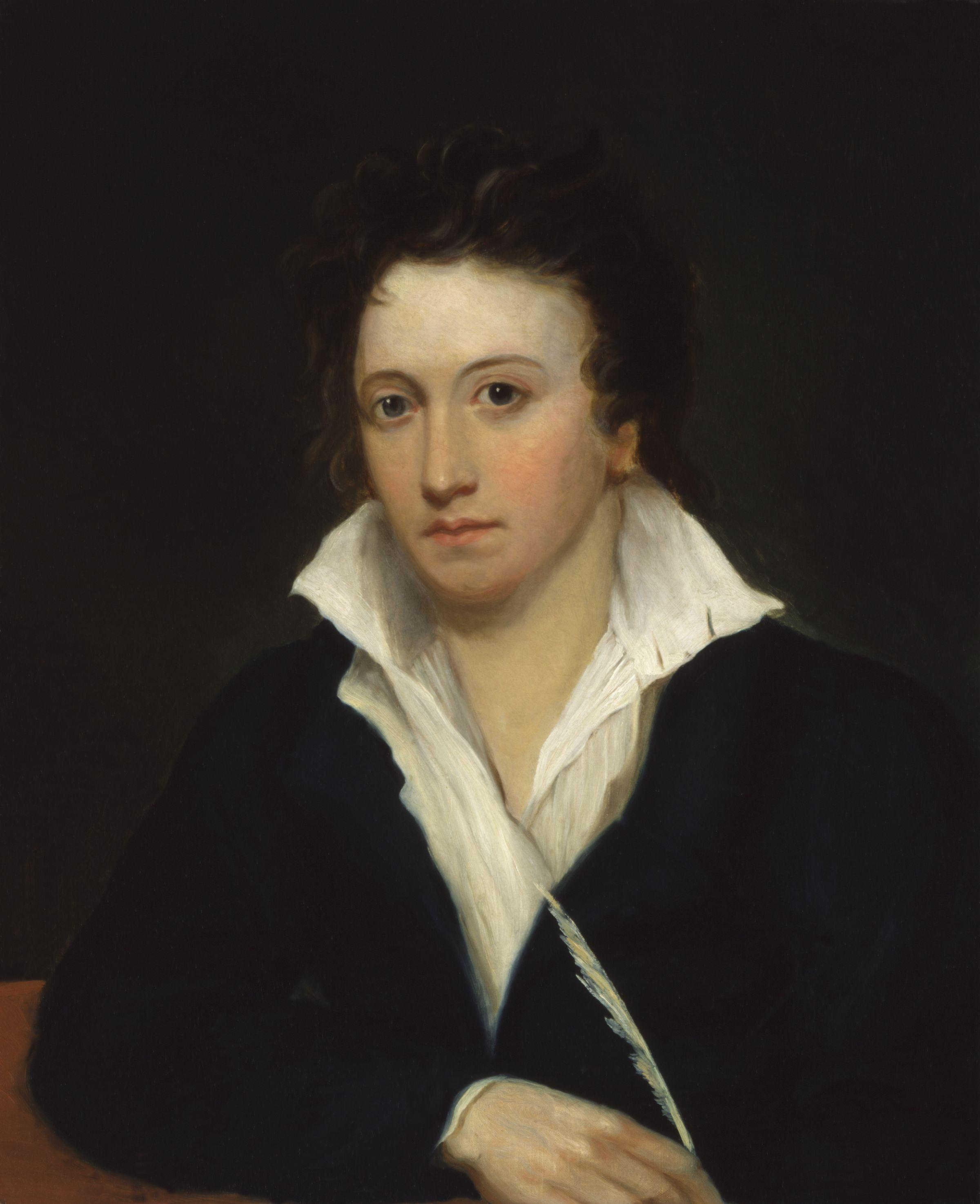
Portrait of Percy Bysshe Shelley in 1819

== Oxford ==
In 1810, Hogg went up to University College, Oxford, his father's alma mater. There he met and became friends with Percy Bysshe Shelley in October 1810. Hogg and Shelley often discussed literature and metaphysics, had a shared disdain for religion and Oxford society, and were united in their belief in free love and free thinking. Although Shelley's father initially feared that his son was being corrupted by Hogg's ideas, he was reassured when he learned that Hogg was from a respectable family.

Hogg and Shelley collaborated on a pamphlet of "mock revolutionary" poetry in late 1810, Posthumous Fragments of Margaret Nicholson, that they attributed to Nicholson herself. She was a mentally unstable washerwoman who in 1786 had attempted to stab King George III with a dessert knife. They also composed a novel together, Lenora, but could not find a printer who was willing to publish such a subversive work.

In early 1811, Shelley and Hogg published The Necessity of Atheism, which outraged the Oxford authorities. Although it was published anonymously, suspicion soon fell on the pair. They refused either to acknowledge or to deny writing the work, and were expelled from Oxford as a result.

== York ==
After leaving Oxford, Hogg was sent to York to serve a legal apprenticeship. Timothy Shelley was furious when he learned of the expulsion, but John Hogg was not minded to discipline his son or to forbid him from associating with Percy Shelley. Prudentia Hogg, who was an Evangelical Christian, was shocked when she learned that her son was promoting atheism. She was further angered when she learned that her son had become a vegetarian, a decision that she attributed to Shelley's corrupting influence.

Hogg found employment in a conveyancer's office in York. Percy Shelley initially planned to visit him, but changed his plans in the spring of 1811 after he fell in love with a young woman named Harriet Westbrook. Shelley had always been opposed to the institution of marriage, but he cared deeply for Harriet and feared she would leave him if they did not marry. Hogg repeatedly made the case to Shelley that marriage was in Harriet's best interests. Shelley was eventually persuaded and eloped with Harriet to Edinburgh.

That autumn Hogg visited the couple in Edinburgh, which he greatly enjoyed. Hogg soon became very attracted to Harriet, and often spent time alone with her whenever Percy asked to write in solitude. Hogg eventually told Harriet of his feelings towards her, but she politely rebuffed him, and began to read novels with moral themes aloud in his presence.

After a stay of six weeks, Hogg had to return to the conveyancer's office in York, and the Shelleys decided to accompany him back to his home in that city. In October 1811 Percy left for London to mediate in a dispute between his father and his uncle. Harriet remained with Hogg, who soon made further unsuccessful romantic advances towards her. Harriet's mother soon learned that Hogg and her daughter were living together, and sent Harriet's sister to stay with them. Harriet complained to Percy Shelley on his return about the way Hogg had treated her; Percy was offended, but nevertheless remained on friendly terms with Hogg. Troubled by the distress felt by his housemates, Percy Shelley suddenly decided to leave York with Harriet and her sister. Hogg subsequently sent him a series of angry letters in which he complained about how he had been treated. In his replies Shelley maintained that he still valued free love, but had left to calm Harriet. Hogg and Shelley subsequently exchanged many emotional letters over the course of the following two months, but then ceased communicating for a year.

In 1811 Hogg wrote a picaresque novel, Memoirs of Prince Alexy Haimatoff. He published it anonymously, with the claim that it had been translated from Latin by a man named John Brown at Prince Haimatoff's request. The book did not sell very well. Later critics have noted a resemblance between Haimatoff and Percy Shelley. Shelley wrote a mostly positive review of the book published in The Critical Review in 1814, but he did criticise the author for promoting "promiscuous concubinage", apparently a veiled reference to Hogg's attempts to seduce Harriet.

== Law studies ==
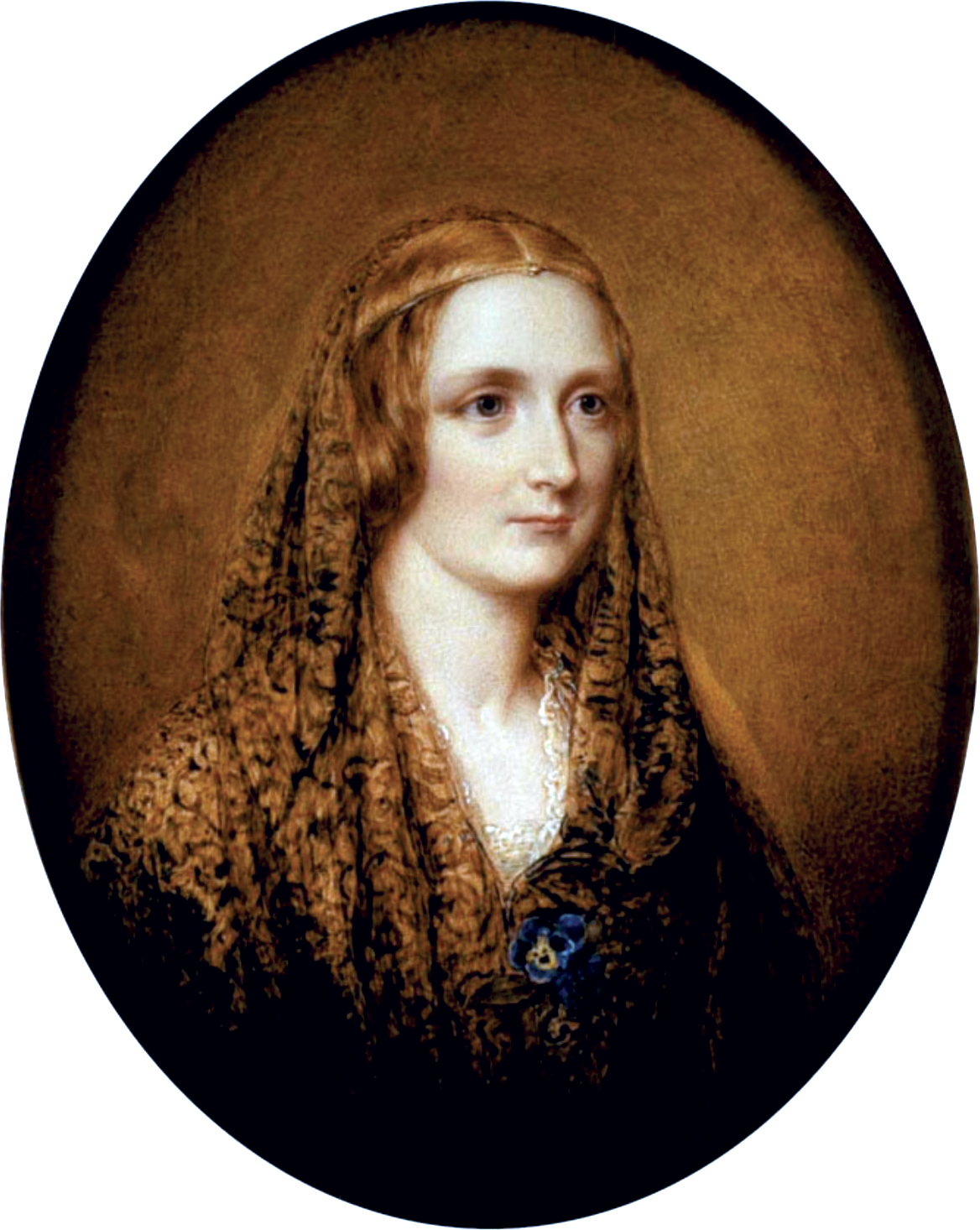
Portrait of Mary Shelley, 1820

Hogg moved from York to London in the spring of 1812 to study law. He tried to conceal his political views from his classmates and spent long hours studying law and reading Greek literature. In 1813 Hogg reconciled with the Shelleys after they visited him in London. They remained in contact after the couple left on a journey to Wales and Ireland. In April 1814, Hogg went to Ireland in an attempt to cheer up Percy Shelley, who had complained of poor spirits in a letter. The Shelleys did not receive Hogg's last letter before he embarked on the journey and had left Dublin before he arrived. Unable to locate them, he returned home. Shelley soon travelled back to London as well.

In the summer of 1814, Hogg first met Mary Wollstonecraft Godwin while visiting William Godwin with Percy Shelley. Soon Hogg heard that Shelley had abandoned Harriet and eloped with Mary to Continental Europe. They returned later that year and Hogg was re-introduced to Mary in November 1814. Although she was initially cool towards him, Mary soon began to enjoy his frequent visits. Hogg became very attracted to Mary Shelley, and when Percy learned of his feelings towards her he encouraged both of them to have an affair, as an expression of free love. Mary, too, valued free love and was initially open to the idea, until she learned that she was pregnant.

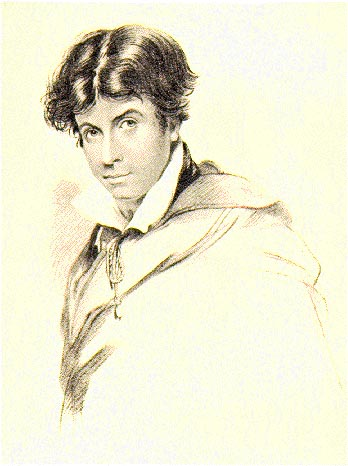
Leigh Hunt

The Shelleys moved to Windsor in the summer of 1815. Hogg visited them there when his workload permitted. They left England for Continental Europe again in May 1816, and Hogg resumed his visits after their return, but he was no longer as close to them as he had been. This was in part due to his awkwardness with Mary, who was preoccupied with her efforts to finish writing Frankenstein. Percy and Hogg were nonetheless able to convince Mary to attend the opera with them on a few occasions.

Percy Shelley soon decided to leave England for Italy in an attempt to improve his health, despite Hogg's attempts to dissuade him. He often invited Hogg to visit him and Mary, which he never did.

John and Prudentia Hogg were glad to hear that the Shelleys had left England, hoping that their son would become more conservative in Percy's absence. They were disappointed with his continued rejection of their Tory political views, but he did attend church with them during his visits and was no longer a vegetarian. They were also somewhat concerned about Hogg's association with the radical publisher Leigh Hunt and his circle of friends. Through Hunt, Hogg became acquainted with several members of London's literary circles, including Thomas Love Peacock, Charles Lamb and Walter Coulson. Hogg also met John Keats, who gave him a copy of his first book of poetry.

Hogg was called to the bar at the Michaelmas term in 1817, and often practised law in Northumberland and Durham. He frequently visited his family, with whom he was then on good terms. His reserved personality proved to be a hindrance to his career, and he remained dependent on financial assistance from his father. He continued studying Greek, and an article that he wrote on Apuleius was published in the third issue of The Liberal in 1822. A paper that he submitted for the fourth issue was rejected, causing him to resent the editors.

== Jane Williams ==
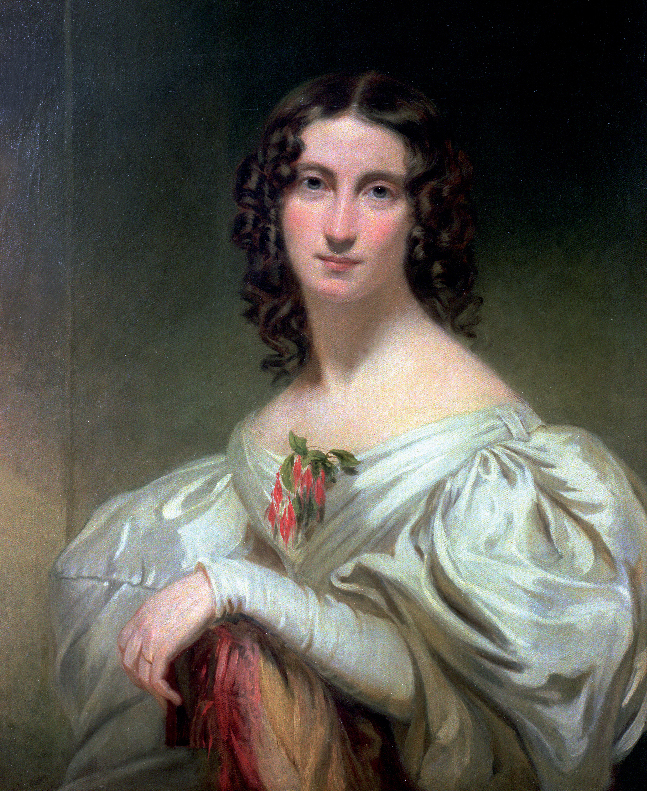
Portrait of Jane Williams, 1822

In 1823 Hogg met Jane Williams while they were both visiting Percy Shelley's friend John Gisborne, husband of Maria Gisborne. Jane and her common-law husband Edward Ellerker Williams had been housemates of Shelley's shortly before his death. Edward Williams and Shelley died in a boating accident, leaving Jane alone with two young children. Hogg soon became very enamoured with her. They saw each other at the Gisborne household regularly during the autumn and early winter of 1823. That December he went back to Northern England to see his family. While he was there, he began writing to Jane regularly. The following spring he frequently visited her at her mother's house, and they often took long walks together. In March she moved out of her mother's house into a home of her own, allowing Hogg to see her more freely.

Jane was still legally married. Therefore, Hogg risked his family's wrath if he pursued a relationship with her. The couple were initially very discreet, and even denied to close friends that they were romantically involved. The situation was eased by the death of Hogg's father's in late 1823; the inheritance he received assured his financial security.

In 1825 Hogg accompanied his brother John on a tour of Continental Europe. Jane encouraged him to take the trip, believing that it would be a test of his commitment to her. He returned to England in February 1826. Although Hogg enjoyed the trip, he missed reading Greek literature and English newspapers. Writing the journals that were published in 1827 under the title Two Hundred and Nine Days occupied much of his time during the trip. He frequently attacked the Catholic Church and customs officials in his journals, but he often made positive observations about the lifestyles of many of the ordinary people that he met. Hogg also recounted his visit to the grave of Percy Shelley in Italy.

== Children ==
Jane became pregnant in spring 1827 and moved into Hogg's house. She then became known as Mrs Hogg, and he devoted himself to being a father to her two children.

Few people in London other than their close friends knew that the couple were not married. Hogg's family had heard rumours that he was planning to marry, and had been curious to know whom he had chosen. They were very upset after hearing of his plans for a union with Jane. His mother was unwilling to introduce Jane to their social circles as Mrs Hogg, which ensured that she would never visit them. Hogg did not enter his family's house in Durham for seven years after he informed them of his relationship with Jane. Word of their union spread throughout Durham, and Hogg stopped practising law there for some time because of the damage to his reputation. Several of their friends were supportive of their union. Mary Shelley particularly approved of their match, despite having earlier been jealous of the time Hogg had spent with Jane.

The couple's first child, Mary Prudentia Hogg, was born in November 1827. Her parents did their best not to spread the news, because she was born soon after they began cohabiting. Mary Prudentia died in May 1829. Jane gave birth to their second daughter, Prudentia, in 1836, and Mary Shelley was selected as her godmother. Hogg's friendship with Mary Shelley was disrupted several years later, however, when she republished Percy Shelley's Queen Mab in 1839. Hogg rebuked her for leaving out its previous dedication to Harriet Shelley, and they did not communicate with each other for several years.

== Legal career and scholarship ==
Hogg continued studying Greek literature and was able to publish some of his opinions about the Greeks in the radical Westminster Review. He used the opportunity to criticise the treatment of the Greeks in the Tory publication Quarterly Review. This article caused some controversy among Hogg's conservative legal colleagues.

Because the advancement of his legal career had been hindered by his marriage to Jane, Hogg hoped to receive a legal appointment from a politically connected acquaintance. This was not an immediate option because the Whig party was in opposition, but in the summer of 1827 Henry Brougham promised Hogg a future position as a professor of civil law at the newly created University College London. Hogg embarked on a course of study in preparation, but the professorship was not established owing to a lack of funds. This setback upset Hogg greatly, and he became very bitter about it. A lecture that he had intended to give at his inauguration was published in 1831.

Hogg had also hoped that his friend Thomas Love Peacock, who worked for the East India Company, would recommend him for a position there. To Hogg's dismay Peacock would not help him, although several years later Peacock did help Hogg's stepson gain employment with the company.

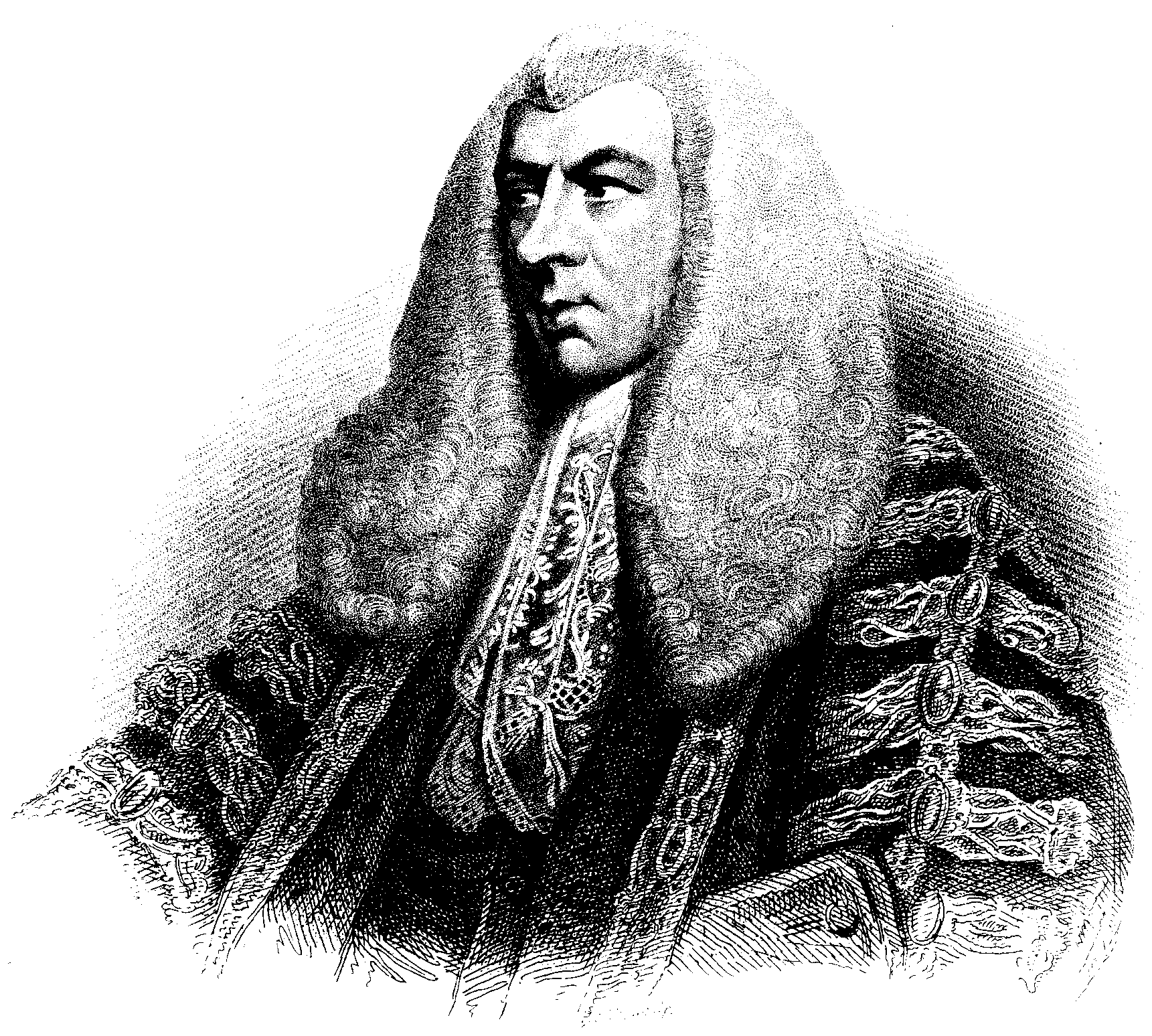
Lord Chancellor Brougham

Hogg published Shelley at Oxford, an account of his memories of Shelley in The New Monthly Magazine in 1833. The article was heavily edited after its submission, which irritated him greatly. The editing was effective however, and many reviewers were very impressed by the finished product. He also contributed articles to the Edinburgh Review. One notable article was a review of the first volume of Barthold Georg Niebuhr's Römische Geschichte. The editor of the Edinburgh Review, Macvey Napier, chose another writer to review the second volume, which infuriated Hogg.

Henry Brougham became Lord Chancellor of the United Kingdom after a Whig election victory. In 1833 he appointed Hogg to a lucrative position on the royal commission to examine the municipal corporations. Hogg became a fierce critic of the resulting Municipal Corporations Act 1835; he preferred a more deliberate and less ideological approach than most of his fellow commission members, and was considered by many to be an unusually conservative Whig. His commission work required him to be away from home for an extended period, which proved to be very difficult for Jane. She knew that Hogg was free to abandon her at any time because they were not legally married. After receiving his appointment, Hogg finally visited Norton House after a seven-year absence, but his family had not altered their opinion of his relationship with Jane.

After his service on the commission ended, Hogg resumed practising law in Northern England, where his brother John had also recently begun to practise. John soon became offended by his brother, objecting to his attempt to use family connections to advance his career.

Hogg gained the position of revising barrister for Northumberland and Berwick in 1838. This required him to travel to Northern England twice a year. Jane often complained about these trips, but Hogg enjoyed visiting the north. He hoped that his legal service would earn him an appointment as a judge, but he was to be disappointed.

In 1841 Hogg wrote Some Recollections of Childhood, a historical novel set in London at the time of the Norman Conquest. He published its chapters in instalments in Edward Bulwer's Monthly Chronicle. The book was not well received by critics, who complained of its discursive nature and poor character development; William Makepeace Thackeray published a particularly scathing review. Hogg had gained a reputation as a Greek scholar however, and contributed to the Encyclopædia Britannica; he was the author of the "Alphabet" and "Antiquities" entries in the seventh edition.

== Family conflicts ==
In 1843 Hogg became the target of a blackmail attempt by John Edward Johnson, Jane's husband. Johnson provided journalist Barnard Gregory with the details of Jane's marital status. Gregory soon published a report on her in The Satirist, but made a crucial mistake. Gregory claimed that the wife of James Hogg, a Member of Parliament for Beverly, was legally married to another man, prompting James Hogg to initiate a libel suit against Gregory. Johnson quickly disappeared after he learned of the error. Gregory was convicted of libel and served a brief prison sentence. Following his release he prepared a correction that he intended for publication, which could have threatened Hogg's legal position. Hogg appealed to Leigh Hunt, who convinced Gregory not to publish. John Edward Johnson died in 1840, ensuring that Jane would never be blackmailed because of her marital status. Although Hogg and Jane were now free to marry they chose not to, to avoid revealing their situation.

Hogg's mother Prudentia died in 1839. As a condition of his father's will, upon the death of his mother, Thomas Jefferson Hogg could purchase his brother's share of Norton House. He decided not to, because of the potential cost of maintaining the house and the hostility Jane could face there. Instead, he allowed his brother to buy his interest in the house, a decision that led to conflict between the two brothers regarding the price and timing of the sale. They eventually worked out the details, and their relationship became friendlier once the sale was completed.

Hogg and his family subsequently lived a mostly quiet and stable life together. At times their finances were strained, although they were able to afford a cook and a maid. Hogg enjoyed spending time with his children and paid particular attention to their education. He taught his daughter Prudentia Greek and Latin, but discouraged her from becoming a Bluestocking. Hogg also tried to convince Jane to study Greek, but was unsuccessful. Henry Cleveland, Jane's nephew, moved into their household after leaving the military. Hogg then accepted Henry as a member of the family. Gardening had always been a hobby of Hogg's, and in his later years he often spent time maintaining his gardens with Jane.

The family's domestic peace was shattered when Hogg's stepdaughter Jane Rosalind became romantically involved with Henry Hunt, the son of Leigh Hunt. Hunt had no clear employment prospects, causing Thomas and Jane to doubt the wisdom of a union. Hogg was very gentle when discussing this with his stepdaughter, hoping to avoid treating her the way that Timothy Shelley had treated Percy Shelley years earlier, but Mary Shelley thought that Hogg took much too passive a stance. Thomas and Jane decided to send Jane Rosalind to France in an unsuccessful attempt to distract her, but she soon returned and married Hunt.

== The Life of Percy Bysshe Shelley ==
In 1857, Sir Percy Shelley, 3rd Baronet, the poet's only surviving child, invited Hogg to produce a biography of his father, who had died more than 30 years earlier. The Shelley family provided Hogg with a number of Percy Shelley's papers for use in his research.

The first two volumes of The Life of Percy Bysshe Shelley were published in 1858, but were poorly received by critics. The book was not as well edited as his previous article and many felt that it did not contain the insights about Shelley and his works that Shelley at Oxford did. The reception was not universally negative however, and several of Shelley's friends enjoyed the book. The Shelley family was very upset at the way Shelley was portrayed; they demanded the return of Shelley's papers and obtained an injunction preventing the publication of any further volumes. Hogg had begun writing a third, but it was never completed.

== Death ==
In later life Hogg suffered from gout, which forced him to curtail many of his activities. He died in his sleep in 1862 at the age of 70. His brother John wrote a very positive obituary for The Gentleman's Magazine.

Hogg left an estate with a net worth of £17,000 (equivalent to about £1.79 million in 2025), most of which went to his daughter, but Jane was also provided for. His brother was bequeathed his collection of books. His sisters, who were by then fairly wealthy, were left only token amounts. Hogg was buried in Kensal Green Cemetery, where Jane was buried beside him 22 years later.

== Bibliography ==
- Bloom, Harold; Edmundson, Melissa (2009), Percy Shelley, Chelsea House Publications, ISBN 978-1-60413-447-6
- Norman, Sylva (1934), Norman, Sylva (ed.), After Shelley: The Letters of Thomas Jefferson Hogg to Jane Williams, Oxford University Press
- Rees, Joan (1985), Shelley's Jane Williams, William Kimber, ISBN 978-0-7183-0549-9
- Scott, Winifred (1951), Jefferson Hogg: Shelley's Biographer, Jonathan Cape
- St Clair, William (1991), The Godwins and the Shelleys: A Biography of a Family, Johns Hopkins University Press, ISBN 978-0-8018-4233-7
