= London Philhellenic Committee =

Philhellenic group established to support the Greek War of Independence

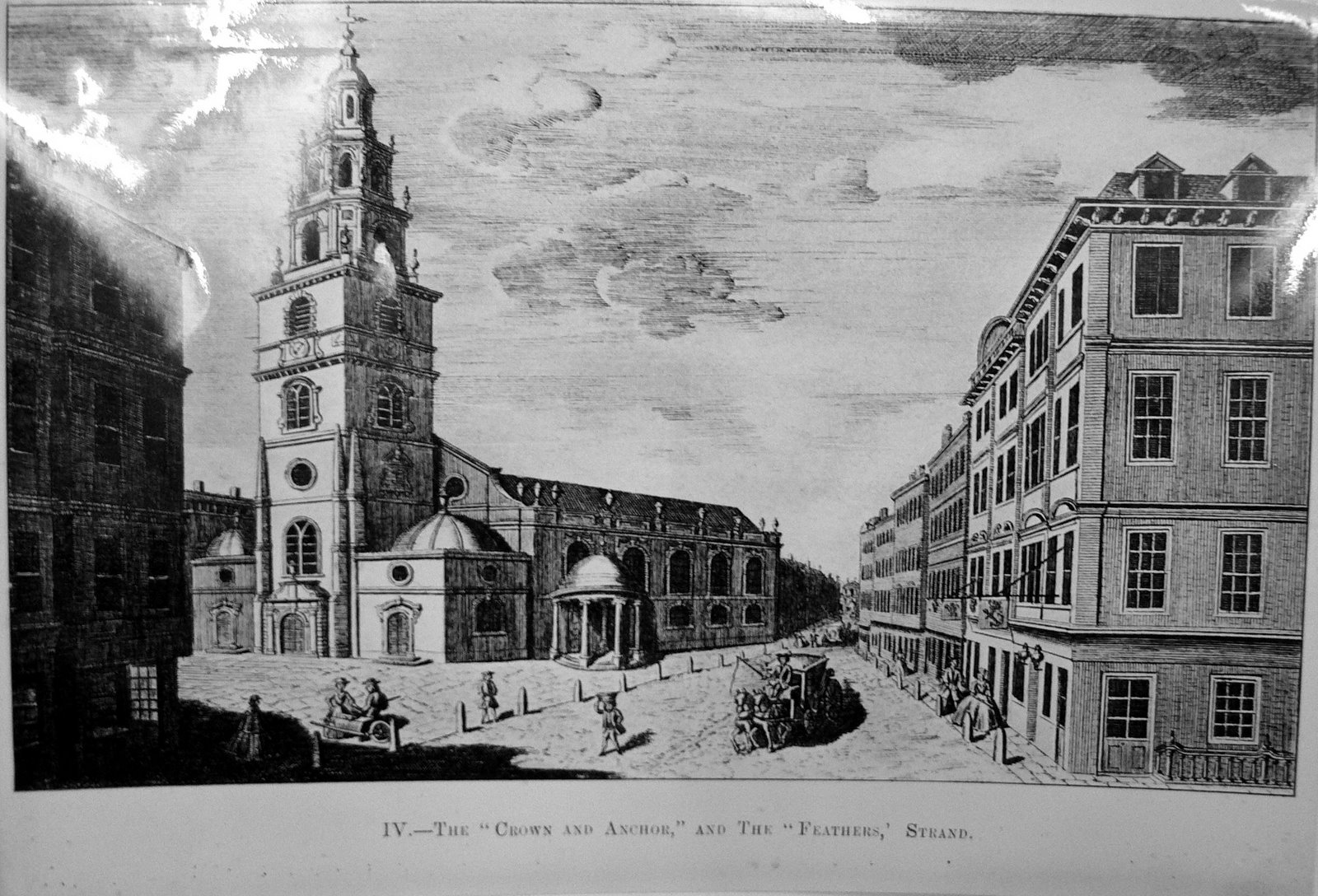
Depiction of the Crown and Anchor tavern, The Strand, London from the 18th century

The London Philhellenic Committee (1823–1826) was a Philhellenic group established to support the Greek War of Independence from Ottoman rule by raising funds by subscription for military supplies to Greece and by raising a major loan to stabilize the fledgling Greek government. Its first meeting was held on 28 February 1823 in the Crown and Anchor Tavern on the Strand.

The committee was established by John Bowring and Edward Blaquiere. Its early members included the reformer Jeremy Bentham and Lord Byron. Other members included Francis Burdett, John Hobhouse, Joseph Hume, Edward Ellice and David Ricardo.

There were two causes that prompted the formation of the committee. Viscount Castlereagh died in 1822 and was replaced by George Canning as Foreign Secretary; and Byron was recruited to the cause.
