= Samuel Barff =

Samuel Barff (27 August 1793 – 1 September 1880) was a banker and a supporter of Greek independence.

== Life ==
Barff was born about 1793, possibly in England. In 1816, he established himself at Zante, became an eminent merchant and banker, and terminated a long career in that island, 1 September 1880, at the age of eighty-seven.

== Greek independence ==
Barff took an active part in the struggle for the Greek War of Independence and was one of the last of the Englishmen connected with that movement. His reputation for honour, kindliness, and fairness is expressed in a series of letters addressed to him from Missolonghi by Lord Byron early in 1824, which are preserved in Moore's 'Life of Lord Byron.' Barff was counted on to manage funds and provide support for Englishmen in Greece. Barff also served as a mediator between the government and Georgio Sisseni, the leader of the district around Gastouni.

Barff was a friend of Lord Byron, offering his country house to Lord Byron in the event of the latter's health requiring his removal from Missolonghi.
