= Edward Ellerker Williams =

Friend of Percy Bysshe Shelley (1793–1822)

Edward Ellerker Williams (22 April 1793 – 8 July 1822) was a retired army officer who became a friend of Percy Bysshe Shelley in the final months of his life. He died with Shelley when the small boat they were sailing sank in a squall.

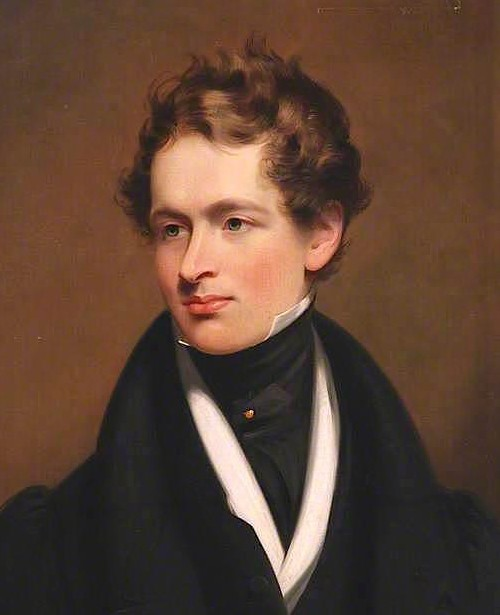
George Clint Edward Ellerker Williams (1839)

== Early life ==
Williams was born in India, the son of an East India Company's army officer, John Williams. His family sent him to England where he attended Eton College. In 1807, at the age of 14, he entered the Royal Navy. His father died at sea in 1809 and in 1811, having received a comfortable inheritance, Williams joined the Eighth Light Dragoons of the East India Company's army in India as a cornet.

He initially served under his half-brother, and was promoted to lieutenant in 1813. Williams's Sporting Sketches during a Short Stay in Hindustane contains drawings and journal descriptions of places and events during a leave of absence he took in 1814. He remained with his regiment until 1817, retiring on half-pay on 28 May 1818. During his time in India he met and served with Thomas Medwin, the cousin of Shelley.

When Williams returned to England, he was accompanied by Jane Johnson, née Cleveland (1798–1884), the wife of another officer, who told him her husband mistreated her and that she was justified in leaving him. Some time before September 1818, she began using the name Jane Williams, and thereafter they presented themselves as Mr and Mrs Williams.

== Friendship with Medwin and Trelawny ==
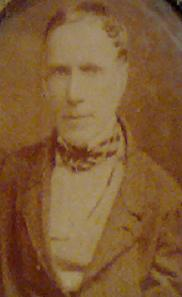
Thomas Medwin c. 1850

In 1819 Thomas Medwin (pictured left) returned to London and persuaded the Williamses to travel with him to Geneva, where they lived until September 1820. Williams contributed an article on big game hunting to a Swiss encyclopaedia, Bibliotèque universelle des sciences, belles-lettres, et des arts. In February 1820, Jane and Edward's first child, Edward Medwin Williams (d.1897), was born.

After Medwin left, the Williamses moved first to Chalon and then to Italy. In Pisa in January 1821, they met with Medwin again and were introduced to Shelley's circle. Williams became a close companion of Shelley, writing a play under his tutelage – The Promise, or a Year, a Month and a Day. It was sent to Covent Garden, but rejected. The Williamses' second child, Jane Rosalind (d.1880), was born on 16 March.

Williams met Lord Byron in November 1821 and Edward John Trelawny in January 1822. While Mary Shelley was struggling to overcome the effects of another miscarriage, Shelley developed what one biographer has termed an "escapist crush" on Jane Williams, addressing many of his poems to her.

== Death ==
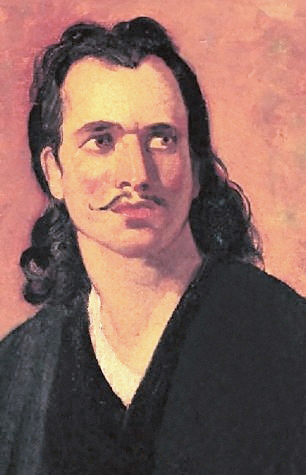
Trelawny by Joseph Severn

On 1 July 1822, Williams and Shelley set off in Shelley's small boat Don Juan, intending to sail to Leghorn (Livorno). They took with them as crew an eighteen-year-old boatman, Charles Vivian. About 10 nautical miles (19 km; 12 mi) off the coast they ran into a storm, and the boat sank with all hands. The bodies washed ashore, and were buried temporarily until Trelawny could obtain permission for cremation. Williams was cremated in Tuscany on 15 August, followed a day later by Shelley. Williams's ashes were carried back to England by Jane. From 1827 she lived as the wife of another friend of Shelley's, Thomas Jefferson Hogg. On her death Williams's ashes were buried with her in Kensal Green Cemetery.

== Journal and notebooks ==
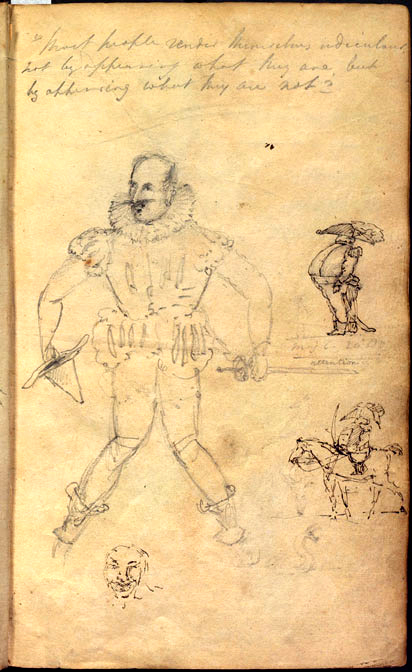
Sketch by Williams from Notebook (circa. 1819–1822) Transcription of text at top of the sketch: "Must people render themselves ridiculous, not by appearing what they are, but by appearing what they are not?"

Williams produced at least four journals or notebooks in addition to Sporting Sketches during a Short Stay in Hindustane. The original copies can be viewed at three libraries:

Journal (21 October 1821 – 4 July 1822) recording his day-to-day activities during the eight-month period before the fatal drowning accident on 8 July 1822 is part of the Special Manuscript Collection at the British Library, London (Add. 36622).

Notebook (circa. 1819 – 1822) containing many sketches, botanical specimens, fragments of poems, and one particular pencil portrait that might be of Shelley is now part of the Donald Prell Collection of Edward John Trelawny at the Honnold/Mudd Special Collections at the Libraries of the Claremont Colleges, Claremont, California. http://ccdl.libraries.claremont.edu/cdm4/browse.php?CISOROOT=/joe

Notebook (28 May – 2 June 1819) recording his travels on the continent with his friends and family, manuscript in the Carl H. Pforzheimer Collection of Shelley and His Circle at the New York Public Library (call number S'ANA 0399)

Journal (18 April – 2 December 1807) Holograph manuscript Log of HMS Superb in the Carl H. Pforzheimer Collection of Shelley and His Circle (call number S'ANA 0153)

== Bibliography ==
- Maria Gisborne & Edward E. Williams, Their Journals and Letters, Edited by Frederick L. Jones, (1951) Norman, University of Oklahoma Press
- Journal of Edward Ellerker Williams, with an introduction by Richard Garnett, (1902) London, Elkin Mathews
- Shelley and His Circle 1773–1822, Edited by Donald H. Reiman, Cambridge, Harvard University Press Vol. IV, pp. 816–829
- Carol L. Thoma, Williams, Edward Ellerker (1793–1822), Oxford Dictionary of National Biography, Oxford University Press, 2004 accessed 3 Jan 2008
