= Jane Williams =

British woman (1798–1884); Shelley's muse

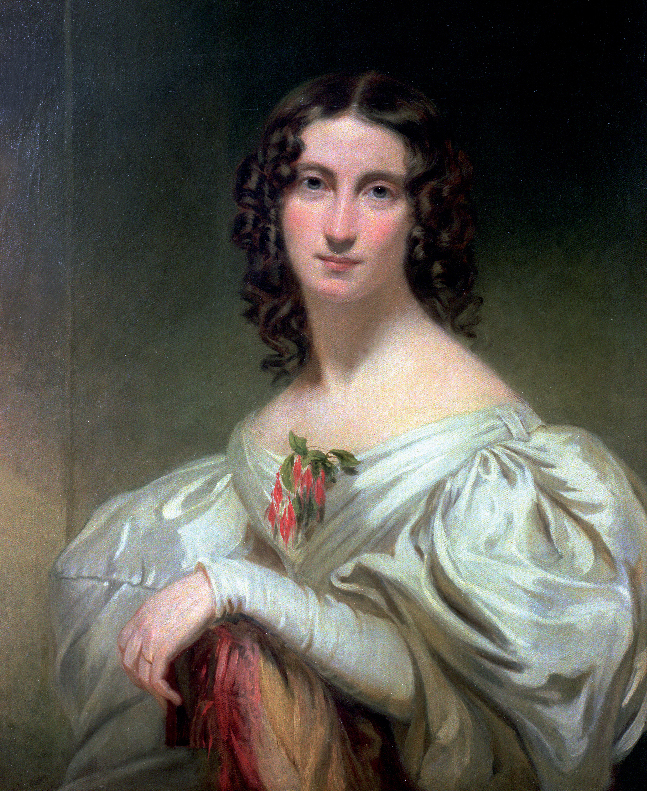
- Portrait of Jane Williams by George Clint
- Born: Jane Cleveland; 21 January 1798; Marylebone, London, England
- Died: 8 November 1884 (aged 86); London, England
- Resting place: Kensal Green Cemetery
- Occupation: Housewife
- Known for: Inspiring poems by Percy Bysshe Shelley
- Spouse: John Edward Johnson (m. 1814; died 1840)
- Partner(s): Edward Ellerker Williams; Thomas Jefferson Hogg
- Children: Edward Medwin Williams; Jane Rosalind Williams; Mary Prudentia Hogg; Prudentia Sarah Jefferson Hogg
- Parent(s): John and Mary Cleveland

Jane Williams (née Jane Cleveland; 21 January 1798 – 8 November 1884) was a British woman best known for her association with the Romantic poet Percy Bysshe Shelley. Jane was raised in England and India, before marrying a naval officer and settling in London. She soon left him for another military officer, Edward Ellerker Williams. After Edward and she left England for Italy, they became acquainted with Percy and Mary Shelley. Though she never had a romantic relationship with Shelley, near the end of his life he became deeply infatuated with her and addressed several of his poems to her. After Shelley and Edward Williams perished in a boating accident, she lived with Thomas Jefferson Hogg, also a close friend of Shelley, and had two children with him. The rest of her life was spent as a housewife in London.

== Early life and first marriage ==
Jane was born in Marylebone into a wealthy family who owned an extensive library. Her mother gave birth to her when she was close to forty years old. Her father, who had spent much of his life working in India, died shortly after her birth. Her mother soon gambled away much of the family fortune. She was the family's fifth child.

As a girl, she learned to sing and to play the harp, the guitar, and the piano. By her mid teens, Jane possessed an annual annuity of only £30. Jane spent much of her early life around military officers. Her brother, John Wheeler Cleveland, was an officer in the British Army who eventually reached the rank of general. He was deployed to India as a young man. Jane spent part of her childhood in India. While in India, she learned Hindustani and remained proficient in the language throughout her life. She often incorporated Indian harmonies into her music.

After returning to London, she fell in love with John Edward Johnson, who was the captain of an East Indiaman. This was a potentially lucrative career, and they were married at St Pancras Old Church in 1814. Though she could have travelled with him, Jane remained at home. They soon separated, most likely due to abuse by John. Jane later said that she suffered "irreparable injuries" while married to him.

== Relationship with Edward Williams ==
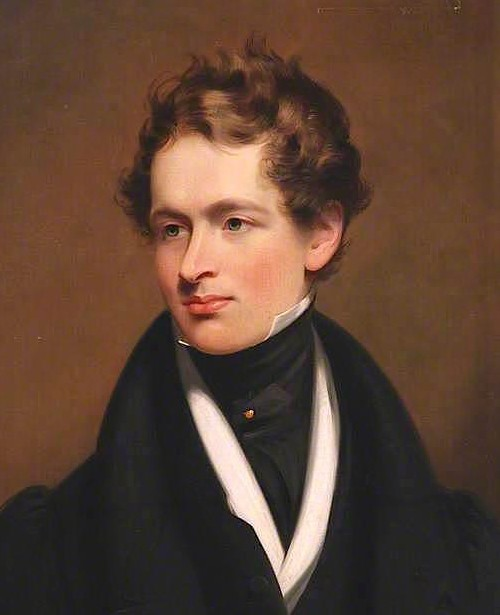
George Clint: Edward Ellerker Williams (1839)

After John Johnson left on a voyage in May 1817 Jane decided to leave him for Edward Ellerker Williams, to whom she may have been introduced by John. Williams was an Eton College graduate who had served in the Navy before becoming a lieutenant in the 8th Dragoons. Edwards had inherited enough money from his father, a military historian and descendant of Oliver Cromwell, to allow them to live comfortably. Although they never legally married, she became his common-law wife and began referring to herself as Mrs. Jane Williams. Their relationship initially drew disapprobation from their families, with Jane's brother and Edward's stepmother reproaching them for their decisions. Jane's brother later apologised, and declared Johnson a "vile fellow". Edward's stepmother, however, always resented Jane. Though long distance mail moved very slowly then, Jane and her husband exchanged angry letters shortly after she left him for Edward. When John returned to London in late 1818, he made no attempt to force Jane to return to him, although it was his legal right to do so.

Jane and Edward decided to leave London in 1819 after listening to Edward's friend Thomas Medwin discuss his travels of Europe. They travelled to Geneva in September 1819 and stayed in a house that Medwin had found for them. By the time they arrived, Jane was four months pregnant. In February 1820, she gave birth to their first child, Edward Medwin Williams. That summer, Jane became pregnant again. Medwin left Geneva in September 1820 to visit his cousin, Percy Shelley, in Pisa. Jane and Edward then travelled to France for several months, before joining Medwin and the Shelleys in Pisa in January 1821.

=== In Italy ===
Jane and Edward enjoyed living in Italy and immediately got along well with Percy and Mary Shelley. Medwin soon left them to travel to Rome. Their second child, Jane Rosalind, was born in March 1821. While they lived in Pisa the Shelleys and the Williamses often dined and went for walks together. Edward and Percy Shelley soon became close friends and often went boating, though this practice made their wives nervous. Percy Shelley often read his poetry to Edward, who was very impressed by its quality. Shelley also encouraged Edward to begin writing a play himself.

That summer, both couples moved into nearby summer homes. In November, they returned to Pisa and met Lord Byron, who had recently arrived there himself. The two couples later shared a house in a remote location near Lerici, where they were visited in early 1822 by Edward John Trelawny. Though they enjoyed each other's company, the house was small and the arrangements led to numerous conflicts between the servants of each family.

== Shelley's infatuation ==
In June 1822, Mary Shelley suffered a miscarriage that left her depressed and irritable. After the conflicts this caused in her marriage, Percy Shelley developed strong feelings for Jane. He was particularly taken by her musical gifts and skill as a housewife. Shelley saw Jane as an ideal or even utopian woman, the embodiment of the qualities that he had always sought in a woman. This attraction and the close quarters in which the couples lived caused what has been described as "an extraordinary and mounting tension within the isolated household". Though she was flattered by the attention, Jane was careful not to reciprocate openly in order to avoid arousing her husband's suspicions. She was successful in her attempts to prevent Edward from suspecting infidelity on her part.

=== Poetry ===
Shelley wrote eleven poems for Jane during that time. She served as the primary inspiration for the last poems that he wrote before his death. This did not bother Edward; he was proud that his wife inspired such poetry. Some biographers of Shelley have maintained that Shelley's feelings for Jane were strictly platonic, although different scholars have observed themes of frustrated sexual desires in Shelley's poetry during this period. Other critics have noted that Shelley's poems during this period struggle to define his feelings.

Having previously been drawn to other musical women, Shelley greatly appreciated her talents. Jane could skilfully play the flute, harp, and guitar. Shelley was particularly captivated by Jane's singing voice, to the extent that some commentators have suggested it had a hypnotic effect on him. Shelley once purchased a guitar for Jane, and commemorated the gift in the poem "With a Guitar, to Jane". In this poem, he ascribes to her voice the ability to alter the consciousnesses of her audience. Jane kept the guitar for her entire life and played it often. Shelley also purchased her a flageolet and wanted to give her a harp, but abandoned that plan due to its expense.

Shelley attempted to disguise his feelings for her in these poems because he expected that Edward and she would read them together. In some cases, Shelley addressed the poems that were inspired by his feelings for Jane to both Edward and Jane. After writing poems in which his affections were less disguised, such as "The Serpent is shut out from Paradise", he hinted to Edward that he did not want Jane to see the poem. Shelley also used Edward as a stand-in for himself, having Edward read poems to Jane that Shelley had filled with ambiguous pronouns and innuendos. During this time, Percy Shelley concealed many of his interactions with Jane from his wife Mary. Jane later passed on the poems that Shelley had given her to Thomas Medwin and Edward John Trelawny; Trelawny later published them.

== Return to England ==
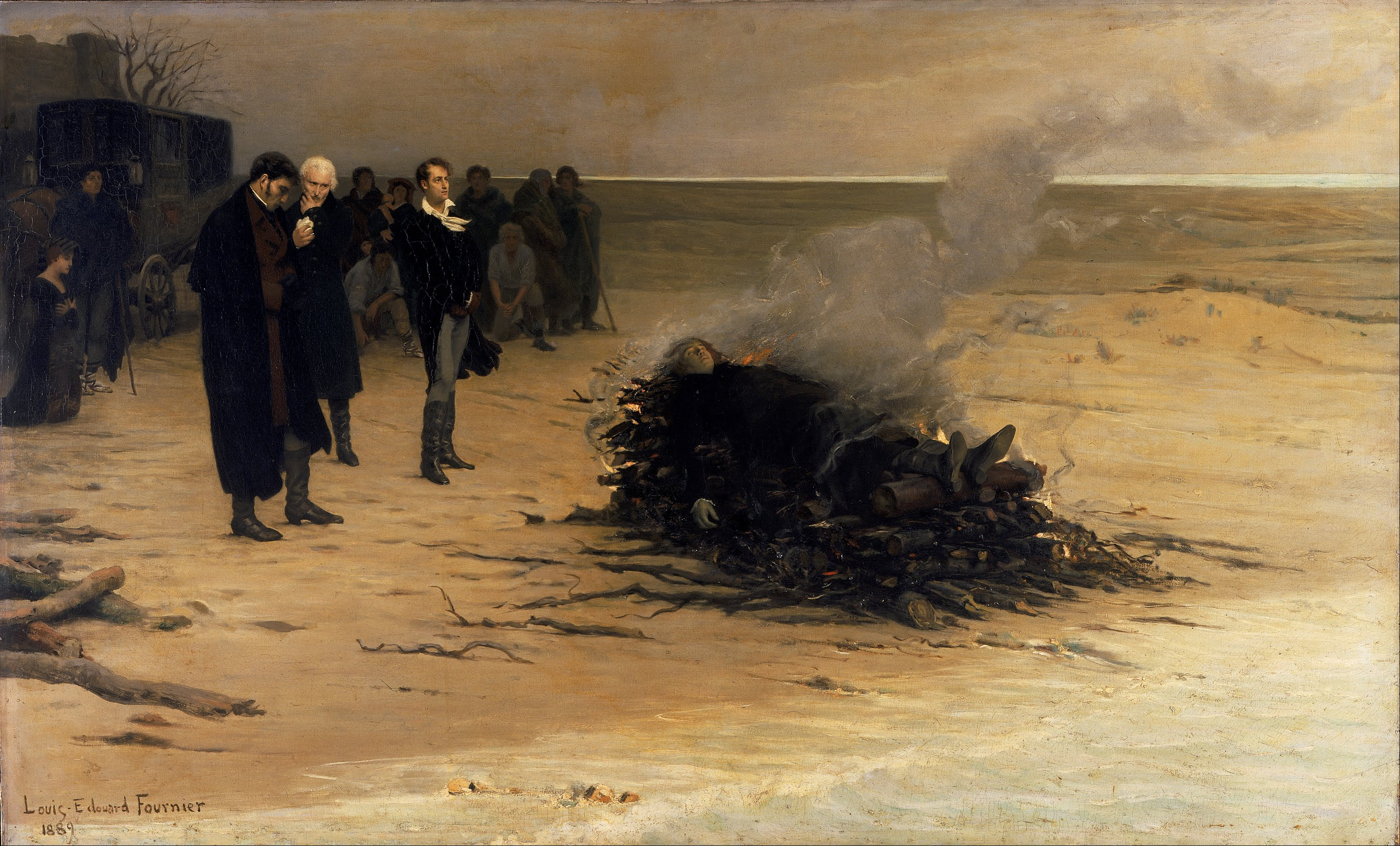
The Funeral of Shelley by Louis Edouard Fournier (1889)

In July 1822, Edward Williams and Percy Shelley drowned when their boat sank during a storm while returning to Lerici from Pisa. Shortly before their deaths, Jane dreamed of floods and on one occasion thought that she had seen Shelley's ghost through a window. After hearing of their deaths, Jane and Mary travelled back to Pisa for the funerals of their husbands; Williams and Shelley were cremated on consecutive days in August 1822. After Shelley's cremation, Jane was forced to settle a dispute between Mary Shelley and Leigh Hunt over what to do with what they believed was the unburnt heart of Percy Shelley. Though Hunt had initially taken it from Shelley's pyre, Mary insisted that he return it to her. Though Hunt was initially unwilling to do so, Jane later convinced him that it should be returned. Mary Shelley and Jane Williams briefly settled in Albaro, before proceeding to Genoa together. There they separated in September due to Jane's desire to quickly return to England. Jane brought Edward's ashes with her back to England.

Upon returning to England, Jane initially stayed with her elderly mother and often visited Vincent Novello and his family. Leigh Hunt was acquainted with Novello and had provided Jane with a letter of introduction. Novello enjoyed her company due to her excellent knowledge of music. When Edward's stepmother learned that Jane had returned, she unsuccessfully attempted to gain control of Edward's ashes and their children.

Though she initially contemplated returning to Italy, Jane remained in England, though she described it as a "vile country". Part of the reason she disliked England was the climate, which she blamed for her poor health upon returning to England. Though her legal husband, John Edward Johnson, lived in London as well, Jane referred to herself as a widow during that period. While Jane was in Italy, John Johnson had also told people that he was widowed in order to freely attempt to find a new wife. Soon after her return to England, Jane met Thomas Jefferson Hogg, a lawyer who had been a longtime friend of Percy Shelley, after Mary suggested that Jane consult him about Edward's estate. Hogg had been a schoolmate and a close friend of Percy Shelley, and was drawn to Jane immediately upon her return from Italy. Hogg immediately began pursuing her and in early 1823 they began regularly spending time together. In March 1823, Jane moved out of her mother's home into a home of her own due to renovations at her mother's house. This allowed Hogg to visit her more freely. In the summer and early autumn of 1823, however, Hogg left for northern England on business.

After Mary returned to England in 1823, Jane and Mary initially remained close friends and lived together in Kentish Town. During that time, Jane helped introduce Mary into society.

== Relationship with Hogg ==
Hogg's father died in late 1823. This removed one of the potential obstacles to him openly living with Jane, the possibility of his father disinheriting him. Jane was initially hesitant to pursue a relationship with Hogg, however. As a condition of her acceptance, she insisted that he qualify by taking a tour of Europe. He left England in August 1825 and returned nine months later. She moved into his house in April 1827, and shortly after became pregnant. Few people in London knew that they were not married, with the exception of Hogg's family and their close friends. Mary Shelley was particularly approving of their union.

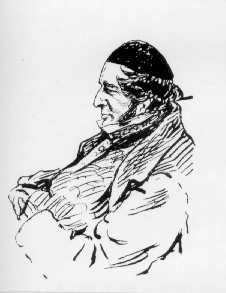
Sketch of Thomas Jefferson Hogg in 1857

In November 1827, Jane gave birth to Mary Prudentia Hogg after a difficult pregnancy. Mary Prudentia only lived 18 months, however, dying in May 1829. During Jane's pregnancy, Mary Shelley learned that Jane had spoken openly of Percy Shelley's attraction to her and coolness towards Mary late in his life. These revelations significantly hurt Mary's feelings. Their friendship survived, however, and Mary Shelley was selected as the godmother of Jane's daughter Prudentia Sarah Jefferson Hogg in 1836.

Jane's legal husband, who was still living in London, attempted to blackmail her in 1838 by publishing the details of her marital status in Barnard Gregory's The Satirist. Johnson published the notice after learning that she was living with a Mr. Hogg. He was mistaken as to the identity of her lover, however, and attempted to blackmail James Hogg, a Member of Parliament for Beverly. After James Hogg prepared to bring a libel suit, Johnson quickly disappeared. Although one journalist initially planned to publish the correct identities of the parties involved, at Mary Shelley's request Leigh Hunt convinced him not to publish the story. Johnson died in Hammersmith in 1840, ensuring an end to the matter. Though they were now free to marry, Jane and Thomas declined to marry in order not to draw attention to the fact that they had been unmarried for so long.

When Jane Rosalind and Henry, Leigh Hunt's son, became romantically involved, Jane strongly disapproved of the relationship. She sent Jane Rosalind to live with her old friend Claire Clairmont in France in an attempt to thwart the match. Clairmont, however, took Jane Rosalind's side and sent her back to England to be with Henry. Jane then relented and allowed them to marry, which they did in 1842. Jane's disapproval of the match caused serious offence to Leigh Hunt and his family.

After Hogg's father died, he had to opportunity to move into his family home north of London. Although he initially considered doing so, he chose to stay in London due to the expense that maintaining a large home would involve. Jane also enjoyed living in London, she visited with friends and often gardened with her husband in his later years. The family led a quiet and stable life together, though at times their finances were strained.

== Widowhood ==
Thomas Jefferson Hogg died in 1862. Though the bulk of Hogg's estate was left to their daughter Prudentia, Jane was provided for in the will as well.

Though Jane never used her connection with Shelley to gain any publicity, she did entertain prominent admirers and biographers of Shelley, including George Eliot and William Michael Rossetti. In the years before Hogg's death, a nephew of Jane's, one of John Cleveland's seven children, came to live with them after leaving the military due to an illness. Jane and her nephew, Harry Cleveland, became close friends and he began to run her household as she grew older. In her later years, Jane often read novels, played the piano, and spent time with Harry's daughter and her grandchildren.

She lived a long life, and in her later years often wrote on census forms that she was born later than she actually was. Shortly before she died in 1884, she had a stroke that left her deaf and bedridden. After her death, she was buried along with the ashes of Edward Williams next to Thomas Jefferson Hogg in Kensal Green Cemetery.

== See also ==
- One Word is Too Often Profaned

== Bibliography ==
- Angeli, Helen Rossetti (1911), Shelley and his friends in Italy, Brentano's
- Crook, Nora; Webb, Timothy (1997), The Faust Draft Notebook: A Facsimile of Bodleian MS. Shelley adds. e.18, Bodleian Shelley Manuscripts, vol. 19, Routledge, ISBN 978-0-8153-1154-6
- Garnett, Richard (1900). "Williams, Edward Elliker" . In Lee, Sidney (ed.). Dictionary of National Biography. Vol. 61. London: Smith, Elder & Co.
- Garnett, Richard (1891). "Hogg, Thomas Jefferson" . In Lee, Sidney (ed.). Dictionary of National Biography. Vol. 27. London: Smith, Elder & Co. p. 104.
- Gribble, Francis Henry (1911), The romantic life of Shelley and the sequel, G.P. Putnam's Sons, ISBN 978-0-8383-1566-8
- Jeaffreson, John Cordy (1885), The Real Shelley: New Views of the Poet's Life, vol. 2, Hurst and Blackett
- Matthews, G.M. (1961), "Shelley and Jane Williams", The Review of English Studies (45), Oxford University Press: 40–48, doi:10.1093/res/XII.45.40
- Mellor, Anne Kostelanetz (1989), Mary Shelley: her life, her fiction, her monsters, Routledge, ISBN 978-0-415-90147-5
- Norman, Sylva (1934), Norman, Sylva (ed.), After Shelley: The Letters of Thomas Jefferson Hogg to Jane Williams, Oxford University Press
- O'Neill, Michael; Reiman, Donald H. (1997), Shelley VIII: Fair-Copy Manuscripts of Shelley's Poems in European and American Libraries, Manuscripts of the Younger Romantics, vol. 7, Routledge, ISBN 978-0-8153-1151-5
- Rees, Joan (1985), Shelley's Jane Williams, William Kimber, ISBN 978-0-7183-0549-9
- Salt, Henry Stephens (1887), A Shelley primer, Reeves and Turner
- Seymour, Miranda (2002), Mary Shelley, Grove Press, ISBN 978-0-8021-3948-1
- Vatalaro, Paul (2009), Shelley's music: fantasy, authority, and the object voice, Ashgate, ISBN 978-0-7546-6233-4
