= Bright Star (soundtrack) =

2009 film score by Mark Bradshaw

Bright Star (Music from the Motion Picture)

Film score by Mark Bradshaw
- Released: 15 September 2009 (digital); 13 October 2009 (physical)
- Recorded: 2009
- Genre: Film score
- Length: 23:27
- Label: Lakeshore
- Producer: Mark Bradshaw

Mark Bradshaw chronology
8 (2008)	Bright Star (2009)	A Passionate Woman (2010)

Bright Star (Music from the Motion Picture) is the film score to the 2009 film Bright Star directed by Jane Campion starring Ben Whishaw and Abbie Cornish. The film score is composed by Mark Bradshaw and featured original score and compositions from John Keats' sonnets. The soundtrack was released through Lakeshore Records digitally on 15 September 2009 and in physical formats on 13 October 2009.

== Development ==
Campion asked Mark Bradshaw to score music for Bright Star owing to their personal and working relationship, where the latter had composed for two of her short films. Bradshaw noted that Campion wished to avoid a conventional film score, an approach that encouraged him to think 'laterally' about the composition. Aiming to derive the music from the narrative, he used Keats' sonnets to interpret the characters' internal rhythms. Bradshaw described the poetry as the film's 'true music,' suggesting that its integration with the score enhanced the final result.

For the track "Human Orchestra", Bradshaw adapted Wolfgang Amadeus Mozart's "Serenade No. 10" as a vocal arrangement.

== Track listing ==
No.	Title	Artist(s)	Length
1.	"Negative Capability"	Mark Bradshaw featuring Abbie Cornish and Ben Whishaw	3:55
2.	"La Belle Dame Sans Merci"	Ben Whishaw	2:28
3.	"Return"	Mark Bradshaw	0:58
4.	"Human Orchestra"	Mark Bradshaw, Ben Whishaw, Samuel Barnett, Cameron Woodhouse, Daniell Johnston	1:48
5.	"Convulsion"	Mark Bradshaw	0:52
6.	"Bright Star"	Mark Bradshaw featuring Abbie Cornish	1:49
7.	"Letters"	Mark Bradshaw featuring Abbie Cornish and Ben Whishaw	3:49
8.	"Yearning"	Mark Bradshaw featuring Ben Whishaw	2:24
9.	"Ode to a Nightingale"	Mark Bradshaw featuring Ben Whishaw and Erica Englert	5:24
Total length:			23:27

== Reception ==
Jonathan Broxton of Movie Music UK wrote "An album for fans of the film, then, but those seeking only the music will probably be left disappointed due to the unthoughtful album presentation." William Ruhlmann of AllMusic wrote "the film contrasts the formality of the setting with the passion of the lovers, and the album will serve as a souvenir to those who were swept away by that emotion." Ray Bennett of The Hollywood Reporter wrote "Mark Bradshaw’s elegant score is pleasingly delicate." Todd McCarthy of Variety wrote "Mark Bradshaw’s score reps a major plus."

Sukhdev Sandhu of The Daily Telegraph wrote "Mark Bradshaw's score [is] full of spaces and silences that give us time to breathe and to think". A. O. Scott of The New York Times wrote "The music is so intricate and artificial, even as the emotions it carries seem natural and spontaneous." Kelly Jane Torrance of The Washington Times considered the film's music to be "more arresting" and added that it "gives this film about grand people an intimacy suited to the story it tells — and it might be the way these people, without orchestras, heard such music."

== Accolades ==
Awards	Date of ceremony	Category	Recipient	Result	Ref.
AACTA Awards (Note: previously known as Australian Film Institute Awards)	11 December 2010	Best Original Music Score	Mark Bradshaw	Nominated	
