= Bright Star (film) =

2009 film by Jane Campion

- Theatrical release poster
- Directed by: Jane Campion
- Written by: Jane Campion
- Produced by: Jan Chapman; Caroline Hewitt
- Starring: Ben Whishaw; Abbie Cornish; Paul Schneider; Kerry Fox; Thomas Sangster; Antonia Campbell-Hughes
- Cinematography: Greig Fraser
- Edited by: Alexandre de Franceschi
- Music by: Mark Bradshaw
- Production companies: BBC Films; Screen Australia; UK Film Council; New South Wales Film and Television Office; Hopscotch International; Pathé
- Distributed by: Warner Bros. Entertainment UK (United Kingdom); Pathé Distribution (France); Hopscotch Films (Australia)
- Release dates: 15 May 2009 (Cannes); 6 November 2009 (United Kingdom)
- Running time: 119 minutes
- Countries: United Kingdom; Australia; France
- Languages: English; French
- Budget: $8.5 million
- Box office: $14.4 million

Bright Star is a 2009 biographical romantic drama film, written and directed by Jane Campion. It is based on the last three years of the life of poet John Keats (played by Ben Whishaw) and his romantic relationship with Fanny Brawne (Abbie Cornish). Campion's screenplay was inspired by a 1997 biography of Keats by Andrew Motion, who served as a script consultant.

Bright Star was in the main competition at the 2009 Cannes Film Festival, and was first shown to the public on 15 May 2009. The film's title is a reference to a sonnet by Keats titled "Bright star, would I were stedfast as thou art", which he wrote while he was with Brawne.

== Plot ==
In 1818 Hampstead, the fashionable Fanny Brawne is introduced to poet John Keats through the Dilke family. The Dilkes occupy one half of a double house, with Charles Brown occupying the other half. Brown is Keats' friend, housemate, and associate in writing.

Fanny's flirtatious personality contrasts with Keats' more aloof nature. She begins to pursue him after her siblings Samuel and Toots obtain his book of poetry, "Endymion". Her efforts to interact with the poet are fruitless until he witnesses her grief for the loss of his brother, Tom. Keats begins to open up to her advances while spending Christmas with the Brawne family. He begins giving her poetry lessons, and it becomes apparent that their attraction is mutual. Fanny is nevertheless troubled by his reluctance to pursue her, as to which her mother surmises, "Mr. Keats knows he cannot like you, he has no living and no income."

After Fanny receives a valentine card from Brown, Keats passionately confronts them and asks if they are lovers. Brown sent the valentine in jest, but warns Keats that Fanny is a mere flirt playing a game. Fanny is hurt by Brown's accusations and Keats' lack of faith in her; she ends their lessons and leaves. The Dilkes move to Westminster in the spring, leaving the Brawne family their half of the house and six months rent. Fanny and Keats then resume their interaction and fall deeply in love. The relationship comes to an abrupt end when Brown departs with Keats for his summer holiday, where Keats may earn some money. Fanny is heartbroken, though she is comforted by Keats' love letters. When the men return in the autumn, Fanny's mother voices her concern that Fanny's attachment to the poet will hinder her from being courted by a more obviously eligible suitor. Fanny and Keats secretly become engaged.

Keats contracts tuberculosis the following winter. He spends several weeks recovering until spring. His friends collect funds so that he may spend the following winter in Italy, where the climate is warmer. After Brown impregnates a maid and is unable to accompany him, Keats finds accommodation in London for the summer, and is later taken in by the Brawne family following an attack of his illness. When his book sells with moderate success, Fanny's mother gives him her blessing to marry Fanny once he returns from Italy. The night before he leaves, he and Fanny say their tearful goodbyes in privacy. Keats dies in Italy the following February of complications from his illness, as his brother Tom had done.

In the last moments of the film, Fanny cuts her hair in an act of mourning, dons black attire, and walks the snowy paths that Keats had walked many times. There she recites the love sonnet that he had written for her, called "Bright Star", as she grieves the death of her love.

== Cast ==
- Ben Whishaw as John Keats.
  Keats was one of the key figures in the second generation of the Romantic movement despite the fact that his work had been in publication for only four years before his death. During his lifetime his poems were not generally well received by critics, and at the age of 25 he died believing that he was a failure. However, his reputation grew and he had a significant posthumous influence on many later poets.
- Abbie Cornish as Fanny Brawne.
  Like the real life Fanny Brawne, Fanny in the film is a fiery and fashionable eighteen-year-old who spends her time creating dresses, hats, and various other garments. She is also something of a flirt and enjoys attending balls, inciting Keats' jealousy. Though the real life Fanny Brawne went on to marry and have children, she never sold Keats' love letters. They were sold after her death by her children.
- Paul Schneider as Charles Armitage Brown, Keats' best friend.
- Kerry Fox as Fanny's mother, a widow.
- Thomas Sangster as Samuel Brawne, Fanny's younger brother.
- Edie Martin as Toots, Fanny's younger sister.
- Antonia Campbell-Hughes as Abigail O'Donaghue Brown, housemaid and mother of Charles Brown's child.
- Claudie Blakley as Mrs Dilke
- Gerard Monaco as Charles Dilke
- Olly Alexander as Tom Keats, Keats' brother
- Samuel Roukin as John Hamilton Reynolds
- Amanda Hale as Reynolds' sister
- Jonathan Aris as Leigh Hunt
- Samuel Barnett as Joseph Severn

== Production ==
In addition to "Bright Star" several other poems are recited in the film, including "La Belle Dame sans Merci" and "Ode to a Nightingale". Both Campion and Whishaw completed extensive research in preparation for the film. Many of the lines in the script are taken directly from Keats' letters. Whishaw, as well, learned how to write with a quill and ink during filming. The letters that Fanny Brawne receives from Keats in the film were actually written by Whishaw in his own hand.

Janet Patterson, who has worked with Campion for over 20 years, served as both costume designer and production designer for the film.

The Hyde House and Estate in Hyde, Bedfordshire, substituted for the Keats House in Hampstead. Campion decided that the Keats House (also known as Wentworth Place) was too small and "a little bit fusty". Some filming also took place at Elstree Studios.

Composer Mark Bradshaw can be seen in the film as the conductor while the male choir performs the track Human Orchestra, which Bradshaw arranged from the third movement of the serenade for twelve winds and string bass by Wolfgang Amadeus Mozart.

== Reception ==
=== Critical response ===
The film garnered positive reviews from critics. Review aggregator Rotten Tomatoes reports that 83% out of 175 critics gave the film a positive review, with an average score of 7.26/10. The website's critical consensus states, "Jane Campion's direction is as refined as her screenplay, and she gets the most out of her cast – especially Abbie Cornish – in this understated period drama." On Metacritic, the film has a weighted average score of 81 out of 100, based on 34 critics, indicating "universal acclaim".

Mary Colbert of SBS awarded the film five stars out of five. "If Campion intended to inspire an appreciation and rediscovery of Keats' poetry," she writes, "she has not only succeeded but herself created an artistic monument to his life, love, poetry and soul." Craig Mathieson stated in the same review that Bright Star is Jane Campion's "best work since The Piano, her epochal 1993 masterpiece." Roger Ebert gave the film three and a half stars out of four.

Poet and scholar Stanley Plumly, the author of Posthumous Keats: A Personal Biography, wrote of the film's writing and direction: "Jane Campion has understood the richly figurative in Keats' life without sacrificing the literal wealth of its texture. She has evoked the mystery of his genius without giving up the reality of its dailiness." In 2019, The Guardian added the film in its 100 best films of the 21st century list. In 2019, the BBC polled 368 film experts from 84 countries to name the 100 greatest films directed by women; Bright Star was voted at No. 54.

=== Box office ===
Bright Star grossed $3,110,560 at the box office in Australia for a worldwide total of $14.4m.

=== Awards ===
Award	Category	Subject	Result
AACTA Awards (2010 AFI Awards)	AFI Members' Choice Award	Jan Chapman & Caroline Hewitt	Nominated
AACTA Awards (2010 AFI Awards)	Best Film	Jan Chapman & Caroline Hewitt	Nominated
AACTA Awards (2010 AFI Awards)	Best Direction	Jane Campion	Nominated
AACTA Awards (2010 AFI Awards)	Best Original Screenplay	Jane Campion	Nominated
AACTA Awards (2010 AFI Awards)	Best Actress	Abbie Cornish	Nominated
AACTA Awards (2010 AFI Awards)	Best Supporting Actress	Kerry Fox	Nominated
AACTA Awards (2010 AFI Awards)	Best Cinematography	Greig Fraser	Won
AACTA Awards (2010 AFI Awards)	Best Editing	Alexandre de Franceschi	Nominated
AACTA Awards (2010 AFI Awards)	Best Original Music Score	Mark Bradshaw	Nominated
AACTA Awards (2010 AFI Awards)	Best Production Design	Janet Patterson	Won
AACTA Awards (2010 AFI Awards)	Best Costume Design	Janet Patterson	Won
Academy Awards	Best Costume Design	Janet Patterson	Nominated
Alliance of Women Film Journalists Awards	EDA Award for Most Beautiful Film		Won
Alliance of Women Film Journalists Awards	EDA Award for Best Supporting Actor	Paul Schneider	Nominated
Alliance of Women Film Journalists Awards	EDA Female Focus Award – Women's Image Award	Jane Campion	Nominated
Alliance of Women Film Journalists Awards	EDA Female Focus Award for Outstanding Achievement by a Woman in the Film Industry	Jane Campion	Nominated
Alliance of Women Film Journalists Awards	EDA Female Focus Award for Best Woman Director	Jane Campion	Nominated
Alliance of Women Film Journalists Awards	EDA Female Focus Award for Best Woman Screenwriter	Jane Campion	Won
ACS Awards	Cinematographer of the Year	Greig Fraser	Won
ASE Awards	Best Editing in a Feature Film	Alexandre de Franceschi	Nominated
BAFTA Awards	Best Costume Design	Janet Patterson	Nominated
British Independent Film Awards	Best Director	Jane Campion	Nominated
British Independent Film Awards	Best Actress	Abbie Cornish	Nominated
British Independent Film Awards	Best Supporting Actress	Kerry Fox	Nominated
British Independent Film Awards	Best Technical Achievement	Greig Fraser (For cinematography)	Won
Cannes Film Festival	Palme d'Or	Jane Campion	Nominated
César Awards	Best Foreign Film	Jane Campion	Nominated
Chicago Film Critics Association Awards	Best Cinematography	Greig Fraser	Nominated
Chicago Film Critics Association Awards	Best Actress	Abbie Cornish	Nominated
Chlotrudis Awards	Best Actress	Abbie Cornish	Nominated
CinEuphoria Awards	Best Actress – International Competition	Abbie Cornish	Won
CinEuphoria Awards	Best Costume Design – International Competition	Janet Patterson	Won
CinEuphoria Awards	Top Ten of the Year – International Competition	Jane Campion	Won
Critics' Choice Movie Awards	Best Costume Design	Janet Patterson	Nominated
Denver Film Critics Society Awards	Best Actress	Abbie Cornish	Nominated
Evening Standard British Film Awards	Best Film	Jane Campion	Nominated
Gay and Lesbian Entertainment Critics Association	Dorian Award for Film of the Year		Nominated
Heartland Film Festival	Truly Moving Sound Award	Jane Campion	Won
Houston Film Critics Society Awards	Best Actress	Abbie Cornish	Nominated
Inside Film Awards	Best Cinematography	Greig Fraser	Nominated
Inside Film Awards	Best Editing	Alexandre de Franceschi	Nominated
Inside Film Awards	Best Sound	Craig Butters	Nominated
Inside Film Awards	Best Sound	John Dennison	Nominated
Inside Film Awards	Best Sound	Tony Vaccher	Nominated
Inside Film Awards	Best Production Design	Janet Patterson	Won
International Cinephile Society Awards	Best Picture		Nominated
International Cinephile Society Awards	Best Cinematography	Greig Fraser	Nominated
International Cinephile Society Awards	Best Actress	Abbie Cornish	2nd Place
IMOA Awards	Best Actress	Abbie Cornish	Nominated
London Film Critics' Circle Awards	Best British Film of the Year		Nominated
London Film Critics' Circle Awards	Best Actress	Abbie Cornish	Nominated
National Society of Film Critics Awards	Best Actress	Abbie Cornish	3rd Place
National Society of Film Critics Awards	Best Supporting Actor	Paul Schneider	Won (Note: Tied with Christoph Waltz of Inglourious Basterds)
Online Film & Television Association Awards	Best Costume Design	Janet Patterson	Won
San Diego Film Critics Society Awards	Best Actress	Abbie Cornish	2nd Place
San Diego Film Critics Society Awards	Best Supporting Actor	Paul Schneider	Nominated
Satellite Awards	Best Film		Nominated
Satellite Awards	Best Director	Jane Campion	Nominated
Satellite Awards	Best Original Screenplay	Jane Campion	Nominated
Satellite Awards	Best Actress	Abbie Cornish	Nominated
Village Voice Film Poll	Best Supporting Actor	Paul Schneider	Nominated
Women Film Critics Circle Awards	Best Actress	Abbie Cornish	Won
Women Film Critics Circle Awards	Best Movie by a Woman	Jane Campion	Nominated

== Soundtrack ==
Lakeshore Records released the soundtrack for Bright Star digitally (iTunes and Amazon Digital) on 15 September 2009 and in stores on 13 October 2009. The film's soundtrack features original music by Mark Bradshaw with dialogue from the film voiced by Cornish and Whishaw.

== Book of Love Letters and Poems ==
A collection of Keats's love letters and selected poems was published in 2009 as a companion to the motion picture, entitled Bright Star: Love Letters and Poems of John Keats to Fanny Brawne. The 144-page book was published by Penguin and includes an introduction written by Campion.
