= British Academy of Arts in Rome =

Art school in Rome (1821–1936)

The British Academy of Arts in Rome was an art school established by a group of British artists in Rome in 1821, and put on a more formal basis in 1823. It closed in 1936.

== History ==
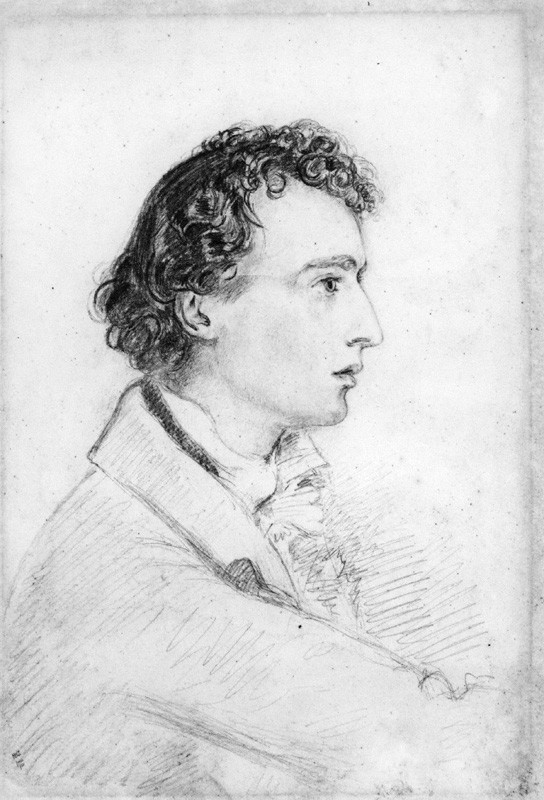
Self-portrait of Joseph Severn.

The Academy had its origins in the community of British artists working in Rome, which had existed since the late 18th century, although its activities were disrupted by the Napoleonic wars. The Academy initially came into being in 1821 and was put onto a more formal footing in 1823, largely through the efforts of Joseph Severn, an English art student who had arrived in Italy in 1820 in the company of his friend, the poet John Keats, who was dying of tuberculosis. Severn set about raising funds for the new institution from various patrons, including the British Ambassador to Naples, William Richard Hamilton (1777-1859, not to be confused with the famous William Hamilton, at that date already dead), who contributed £100, and advised him to open an "Academy investment fund". Severn contacted the President of the Royal Academy in London, Sir Thomas Lawrence for assistance. Although Lawrence rejected any suggestion that the new body in Rome should be formally set up under the auspices of the Royal Academy, he arranged for it to contribute some financial aid, donated to its funds personally and recruited other patrons, securing the backing of George IV, who gave £200 and officially approved the use of the name 'The British Academy of Arts in Rome'.

The Academy was managed by a committee of seven artists. In its first year, 1823, the committee consisted of Charles Eastlake, Seymour Kirkup, Richard Evans, John Bryant Lane, and Richard Westmacott, Junior, as well as Severn himself. To house the Academy, Severn rented premises, comprising six rooms, at 18 Via Sant' Isidoro, which doubled as his own home and studio.

The members of the Academy gathered in the evenings. There were sessions of life drawing, and opportunities to study anatomy. Artists associated with the Academy in its early years included J. M. W. Turner, who stayed with Eastlake when he visited Italy in 1829, and George Richmond, who became involved with it in 1838.

The Academy did not attract a great deal of public attention. In 1845 The Art-Union noted that "save to those who have resided in Rome, it is not generally known that there exists in that city any British Academy of Art", and in 1864 Stephen Watson Fullom wrote

It is a poor substitute for the French Academy, and falls very short of its effect. That institution has been a home to most of the French artists, who there were fellow-pupils, and moulded into a brotherhood. But the English meet only occasionally, and part as strangers or rivals.

Political troubles in Italy, began to limit the number of British artists interested in staying in Rome for any length of time, and Severn himself drifted away from the Academy, having become involved in diplomatic activities, eventually becoming British Consul.

In 1861 the British Academy of Arts in Rome became the subject of interest to a Royal Commission, set up primarily to inquire into the running of the Royal Academy in London. It approved suggestions that a small branch of the Royal Academy could be set up in Rome, but made no recommendation that the existing Academy in Rome could be incorporated into it.

During the later part of the 19th century the Academy, rehoused in an backstreet, fell further into obscurity, until it had something of a revival in 1895, when it moved to premises at 53B, Via Margutta. Under new rules, the British ambassador became, ex officio, the chairman of the Academy Committee. Italian artists were now encouraged to attend, and women were admitted.

In 1911 the Academy was sidelined when the British School at Rome was established, funded by the Commissioners of the 1851 Exhibition and developed out of the British School of Archaeology at Rome, which had been set up ten years earlier.

For the last 25 years of its existence the Academy's 'Honorary Director' was the Maltese sculptor Antonio Sciortino, who gave lessons in sculpture and headed the Academy unpaid. Amongst his innovations was to involve students from other countries in the British Commonwealth. The Academy was eventually closed due to increasing political tensions between Britain and Italy over the invasion of Abyssinia. In January 1936 all activities were 'indefinitely suspended' as a result of Fascist harassment and a consequent fall in student numbers. A box containing its archives was deposited with the British consulate, but could not later be traced.

== Sources ==
- "British Academy of Arts at Rome". Art-Union. 7. December 1845.
- Fullom, Stephen Watson (1864). Rome under Pius IX.
- Munro, Ion S. (11 December 1953). "The British Academy of Arts in Rome". Journal of the Royal Society of Arts. 102 (4914): 42–56. JSTOR 41368263.
