= Fanny Brawne =

Fiancée of John Keats (1800–1865)

Frances "Fanny" Brawne Lindon
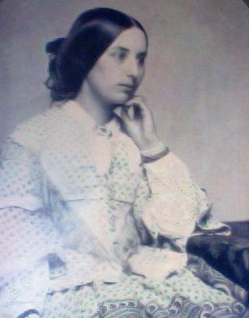
- Ambrotype of Fanny Brawne taken circa 1850 (photograph on glass)
- Born: Frances Brawne; August 9, 1800; West End, Hampstead, England
- Died: December 4, 1865 (aged 65); London, England
- Burial place: Brompton Cemetery, London
- Other name: Fanny Brawne
- Occupation: Translator
- Known for: Fiancée and muse to John Keats

Frances Brawne Lindon (9 August 1800 – 4 December 1865) is best known as the fiancée and muse to English Romantic poet John Keats. As Fanny Brawne, she met Keats, who was her neighbour in Hampstead, at the beginning of his brief period of intense creative activity in 1818. Although his first written impressions of Brawne were quite critical, his imagination seems to have turned her into the goddess-figure he needed to worship, as expressed in Endymion, and scholars have acknowledged her as his muse.

They became secretly engaged in October 1819, but Keats soon discovered that he was suffering from tuberculosis. His condition limited their opportunities to meet, but their correspondence revealed passionate devotion. In September 1820, he left for the warmer climate of Rome, and her mother agreed to their marrying on his projected return, but he died there in February 1821, aged twenty-five.

Brawne drew consolation from her continuing friendship with Keats' younger sister, who was also called Fanny. Brawne later married and bore three children, whom she entrusted with the intimate letters Keats had written to her. When these were published in 1878, it was the first time the public had heard of Brawne, and they aroused interest among literary scholars. But they attracted much venom from the press, which declared her to have been unworthy of such a distinguished figure. This may have been exacerbated by the fact that none of Brawne's letters to Keats have survived, also giving rise to her reputation as a cold and unfeeling personage among earlier Keats scholars. By contrast, the later publication of Brawne's letters to Fanny Keats showed her in a more favourable light, greatly improving her reputation.

== Life ==
=== Early life ===
Frances (known as Fanny) Brawne was born 9 August 1800 to Samuel and Frances at the Brawnes' farm near the hamlet of West End, close to Hampstead, England. She was the eldest of three surviving children; her brother Samuel was born July 1804, and her sister Margaret was born April 1809 (John and Jane, two other siblings, died in infancy). By 1810, her family was in Kentish Town, and on 11 April of that year her father died, at age thirty-five, of consumption. Subsequently, Mrs. Brawne moved the family to Hampstead Heath.

It was in 1818 when the Brawnes went to Wentworth Place—"a block of two houses, white-stuccoed and semi-detached, built three years before by Charles Armitage Brown and Charles Wentworth Dilke"—for the summer, occupying Brown's half of the property. Fanny was introduced to a society which was "varied and attractive; young officers from the Peninsular Wars, perhaps from Waterloo... exotic French and Spanish émigrés ...from their lodgings round Oriel House in Church Row and the chapel in Holly Place." After living at Wentworth Place for a brief time the Brawnes became friends with the Dilkes.

=== Time with Keats, 1818–1821 ===
At eighteen, Fanny Brawne "was small, her eyes were blue and often enhanced by blue ribbons in her brown hair; her mouth expressed determination and a sense of humour and her smile was disarming. She was not conventionally beautiful: her nose was a little too aquiline, her face too pale and thin (some called it sallow). But she knew the value of elegance; velvet hats and muslin bonnets, crêpe hats with argus feathers, straw hats embellished with grapes and tartan ribbons: Fanny noticed them all as they came from Paris. She could answer, at a moment's notice, any question on historical costume. ... Fanny enjoyed music. ... She was an eager politician, fiery in discussion; she was a voluminous reader. ... Indeed, books were her favourite topic of conversation".

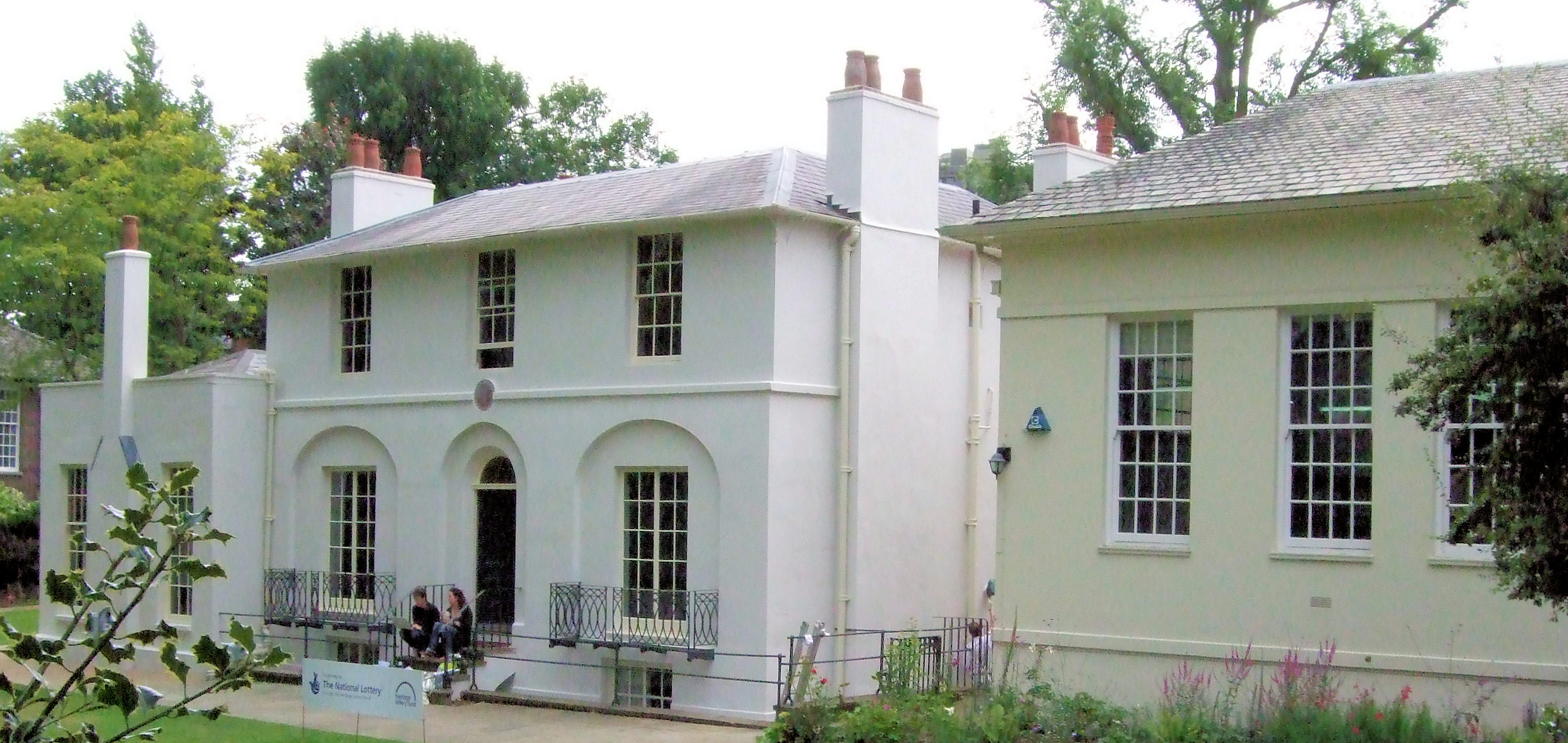
Wentworth Place (left), now the Keats House museum, Hampstead

It was through the Dilkes that Fanny Brawne met John Keats in November 1818 at Wentworth Place. Their initial meeting was cordial and expected—the Dilkes were fond of Keats and spoke of him to the Brawnes often. Fanny enjoyed his company, recalling that "his conversation was in the highest degree interesting and his spirits good, excepting at moments when anxiety regarding his brother's health dejected them"; On 1 December 1818, Keats's younger brother Tom died of tuberculosis, at age nineteen. Keats's grief was deep, as "Some years before, Keats had written that his love for his brothers was "an affection 'passing the Love of Women'" ... Fanny showed him the depth of her understanding. She gave him invigorating sympathy, keeping his mind from the past and from introspection; she encouraged his love of life by her obvious interest in him, and by her vivacity. Remarkably soon his own gaiety returned."

In a letter begun 16 December 1818 to his brother George, in America, Keats mentions Fanny in two separate passages. The first: "Mrs. Brawn who took Brown's house for the summer still resides in Hampstead. She is a very nice woman and her daughter senior is I think beautiful, elegant, graceful, silly, fashionable and strange. We have a little tiff now and then—and she behaves a little better, or I must have sheered off"; the second: "—Shall I give you Miss Brawn[e]? She is about my height—with a fine style of countenance of the lengthen'd sort—she wants sentiment in every feature—she manages to make her hair look well—her nostrills are fine—though a little painful—he[r] mouth is bad and good—he[r] Profil is better than her full-face which indeed is not full [b]ut pale and thin without showing any bone—Her shape is very graceful and so are her movements—her Arms are good her hands badish—her feet tolerable—she is not seventeen—but she is ignorant—monstrous in her behaviour flying out in all directions, calling people such names—that I was forced lately to make use of the term Minx—this is I think no[t] from any innate vice but from a penchant she has for acting stylishly. I am however tired of such style and shall decline any more of it"

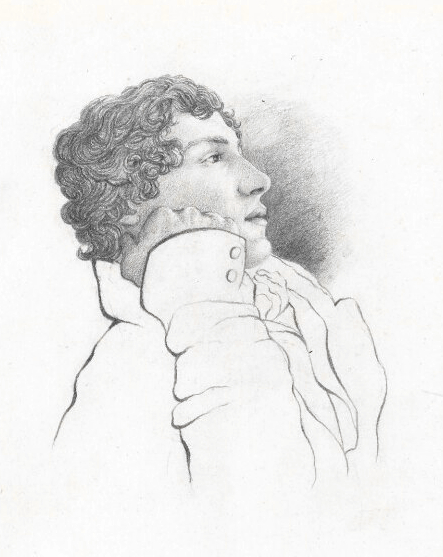
Portrait of John Keats by his friend Charles Brown, 1819

It was not long before Keats fell completely in love with Fanny. "He had transfigured Fanny in his imagination, his passion creating in her the beauty which for him became the truth; and so she had come to be... the fulfilment of Endymion, the very symbol of beauty, the reconciliation between real life and his poetic quest." On 18 October 1819, Keats proposed to Fanny Brawne, who accepted. Though a significant event in their lives, they did their best to keep it secret. Fanny's mother would not be so welcoming of the engagement: Keats had given up a career in medicine to pursue poetry, which, at this point in his life, did not seem to have great prospects. His family had been stricken with illness, and he was unable to sustain himself financially. Her mother did not outright forbid the marriage, but she withheld her legal consent until such time as there was financial stability to match the couple's emotional bond.

Keats, by February, was at Wentworth Place, where Fanny visited him frequently and occasionally met his friends, one of whom was Joseph Severn. However, "as Keats could not dance and was too unwell to take her out himself, she went to parties with army officers. Through the Dilkes and her mother's wide circle of friends she received many invitations," which caused Keats significant anxiety. This constant presence—which he did not dislike—distracted him from poetry; and although he had in May what is regarded as some of the most productive time of his poetic life, he left for the Isle of Wight in June. Over the next months Fanny and Keats carried on an emotional, anxious, and somewhat jealous correspondence; he wrote of love and death, and in between letters he wrote and revised poems. He returned to Wentworth Place in 1819, physically and emotionally unwell.

In early February 1820, Keats went to London and "returned late, cold and feverish. He staggered so badly that Brown thought him drunk. As he got into bed he coughed slightly, and seeing a single drop of blood upon the sheet said to Brown, 'I know the colour of that blood;—it is arterial blood ... that drop of blood is my death warrant.' Later that night, a large lung haemorrhage followed that almost suffocated him. All he could think of was Fanny." Fanny seldom visited Keats in person over the next month for fear of his delicate health giving out, but occasionally would pass by his window after walks, and the two often wrote notes to each other.

In May 1820 Keats decided to leave for Kentish Town; and, over the next months, the two continued an emotional correspondence. Doctors had urged him to relocate to Italy for recovery, as another English winter would most likely prove deadly. He returned, for the last time, to Wentworth Place on 10 August 1820.

Even the imminence of his leaving for Italy (which was to happen in a month's time) did not move Fanny's mother to grant her consent to their marriage. She did, however, promise that "when Keats returned he should marry Fanny and live with them." On 11 September 1820, Fanny wrote Keats's farewell to his sister, also named Frances; and "with [Fanny's] consent he destroyed the letters she had sent him." Before leaving, they exchanged gifts: "perhaps at parting, he offered her his copy of The Cenci and the treasured facsimile of the folio Shakespeare in which he had written his comments and the sonnet on King Lear. He gave her an Etruscan lamp and his miniature, the perfect likeness which Severn had painted of him... Fanny gave him a new pocket-book, a paper-knife, and a lock of her hair, taking one of his own in exchange. She lined his travelling cap with silk, keeping some material in remembrance. She gave him, too, a final token, an oval white cornelian." Stanley Plumly writes that this good-bye, on 13 September 1820, was "the most problematic... the equivalent, in Keats's mind, of leaving life and entering what he will now call, in earnest, his posthumous existence."

On 1 December 1820 Brown received a letter from Keats, which he read to the Brawnes, "skipping & adding, without the slightest suspicion on their part," telling Fanny that if Keats's spirit improved, Severn expected an early recovery"; this illusion was sustained, and all of the worst news was kept from Fanny. On 17 February John Taylor, one of Keats's social circle, received a letter from Severn detailing Keats's suffering; "The doctor said that he should never have left England, for even then he had been incurable; the journey had shortened his life and increased his pain. ... Severn had tried to comfort him with thoughts of spring. It was the season Keats loved best, and he would not know it again. Bitterly he wept. "He kept continually in his hand a polished, oval, white cornelian, the gift of his widowing love, and at times it seemed his only consolation, the only thing left him in this world clearly tangible."" Fanny wrote to Frances Keats on 26 February, "All I do is to persuade myself, I shall never see him again." "Late on Saturday, March 17, the news reached Wentworth Place. On Friday, February 23, a little before midnight, Keats had died in Severn's arms" in Rome.

=== The years after, 1821–1865 ===
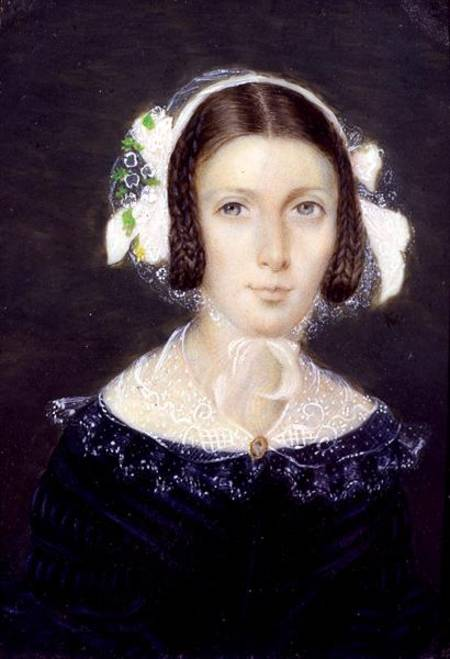
Watercolour of Fanny Brawne, 1833.

Fanny Brawne cut her hair short, donned black clothing, and wore the ring Keats had given her. "A letter from Severn to Taylor reached Hampstead about April 16, and Fanny learned how the Italian health authorities had burned the furniture in Keats's room, scraped the walls and made new windows and doors and floor. She read of the post mortem and the funeral near the monument of Caius Cestius and how Dr. Clark had made the men plant daisies on the grave, saying that Keats would have wished it. Unknown to her family, slowly and with great pain she copied the account of his last days; she did not seal it because his sister might want to read it but she could not read it again." Fanny felt that the only person with whom she could fully share her grief was Frances Keats and the two carried on correspondence that lasted quite some time. In autumn 1821 Fanny visited the young Keats in Walthamstow, where she was in the care of the Abbeys and the two revelled in each other's company. Their constant communication allowed them to develop a close friendship. Eventually Fanny shared with "Keats's sister a little of the literary companionship which she had once known with him."

Two years after the death of Keats, Fanny began learning Italian and translating short stories from the German, eventually publishing them in various magazines. Frances Keats, having come of age around this time, left the Abbeys and went to live with the Brawnes, where she was warmly welcomed.

Fanny came out of mourning in 1827, six years after Keats's death. She rejoined society and donned brighter, gayer clothing again. This post-mourning period was to be short-lived; her younger brother Samuel, age twenty-three, had been showing signs of "consumption" (as tuberculosis was then often called). Samuel grew increasingly ill, and on 28 March 1828 he died. Fanny's mother, who never fully recovered from Samuel's death, made her will in October 1829. On 23 November 1829, Mrs. Brawne died, some days after her dress caught fire as she led a guest across their garden by candlelight.

Around 1833, the Brawnes went to reside with a family (the Bakers) in Boulogne. It was here that Fanny met Louis Lindo; and, on 15 June 1833, more than twelve years after Keats's death, they married. On 26 July 1834, Fanny's first son, Edmund, was born; and on 22 May 1838 her second son Herbert was born. On 10 August 1844, her only daughter Margaret was born, in Heidelberg, where they had gone to live. It was there, she met Thomas Medwin, who was a cousin and biographer of Percy Bysshe Shelley and the writer of a controversial recollection of Lord Byron. Fanny collaborated with him to correct the impression, provided by Mary Shelley in her Essays, Letters from Abroad, Translations and Fragments (1840), that Keats had gone insane in his final days. Lindo showed letters to Medwin that suggested otherwise, and Medwin used this new knowledge in his Life of Shelley (1847), where he published extracts from these letters by Keats himself and his friend Joseph Severn.

In 1859, after many years abroad, the Lindons (as they had started calling themselves) returned to England. Financial troubles towards the end of her life led Fanny to sell her miniature of Keats to Charles Dilke. In the autumn of 1865, Fanny told her children about her time with Keats and entrusted to them the relics from that romance, including the letters Keats had written to her, which she said would "someday be considered of value."

On 4 December 1865, Fanny Brawne died and was buried the next day in Brompton Cemetery.

== Posthumous controversy ==
=== The publication of Keats's love letters to Brawne ===
Following the death of their father on 21 October 1872, Fanny's children Herbert and Margaret Lindon set about looking for potential buyers of their mother's relics. After negotiations with the Dilke family and R. M. Milnes, Herbert decided to publish the letters in book form and auction them some time after. "In February 1878 appeared a slim, elegantly designed volume of under two hundred pages. Edited with an introduction by another of the day's prominent literary men, Harry Buxton Forman, it was entitled simply Letters of John Keats to Fanny Brawne." This move proved shrewd as the publication of the letters caused much interest in England and America. The letters were sold in March 1885 for £543 17s.

The publication and subsequent auction of Keats's letters led to more than just interest in the affair—Fanny Brawne was attacked as unfit to be the object of Keats's affection. Sir Charles Dilke, in a review of the collection of letters in the Athenaeum, "calls the book "the greatest impeachment of a woman's sense of womanly delicacy to be found in the history of literature."" Louise Imogen Guiney remarked in 1890 that "Fanny "was vain and shallow, she was almost a child; the gods denied her the 'seeing eye,' and made her unaware." Seventy years after the poet's death, "most of us are soberly thankful that he escaped betimes from his own heart's desire, and his worst impending peril, Mrs. Keats."" Richard Le Gallienne wrote that "it is certainly a particularly ironical paradox that the lady irritatingly associated with (Keats's) name should be the least congruous of all the many commonplace women transfigured by the genius they could not understand, and the love of which they were not worthy.... Fame, that loves to humour its poets, has consented to glorify the names of many unimportant poor relations of genius, but there has never been a more significant name upon its lips than the name of Fanny Brawne.... One writes so, remembering... the tortures to which she subjected a noble spirit with her dancing-class coquetries."

=== The publication of Fanny Brawne's letters to Fanny Keats ===
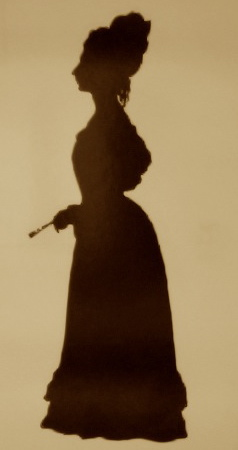
Silhouette of Fanny Brawne, aged 28, 1829. By Augustin Edouart.

In 1934, a collector of Keats donated his collection to the Keats Memorial House, Hampstead, on the condition that he should remain anonymous. Included in the donation were the letters that Fanny Brawne had written to Frances (Fanny) Keats between September 1820 and June 1824. In 1937, Oxford University Press published Letters of Fanny Brawne to Fanny Keats; and Fred Edgcumbe, editor of the volume and curator of the Keats Memorial House, commented in his introduction that "Those who believed in Fanny Brawne's devotion to Keats have the satisfaction of knowing that their faith has at last been justified." It did not take long for this idea to take general hold. "A leading critic, to then an archfoe of Fanny's, almost gladly announced his capitulation. "I have seized the opportunity," explained John Middleton Murry, "of considering anew the character of Fanny Brawne and the nature of her influence on Keats." After reviewing what he'd written about her twenty-five years before, he says, "I have had the deep satisfaction of being able completely to recant the harsh judgment I then passed upon her."" This sentiment has remained strong, as "in 1993 appeared a book discussing Keats's "Poetics, Letters, and Life." It ends with a chapter on the notorious love-letters... Fanny is approved as a paragon among women, "unsentimental, clear-sighted, frank, inquisitive, animated, kind, and invigorating. Her beauty resonated with the grace that comes of insight and deep abiding affection.""

According to Amy Leal, Jane Campion's film about Keats's and Brawne's relationship "reflects the critical transformations in Brawne scholarship in recent years," painting her as "the steadfast "Bright Star" of Keats's sonnet, and it is Keats who is fickle, torn between his vocation and Fanny... she is La Belle Dame without the nightmare thralldom, witty and chic but also deeply kind and maternal, an aspect of her character that is often missed in readings of her."

John Evangelist Walsh presents a more moderate approach to Fanny. He remarks that the letters, rather than completely doing away with what had been implied in Keats's letters to her, "briefly illuminate another side of the girl's character, those quieter personal qualities which had helped attract Keats in the first place but which were not always uppermost. Certainly the letters show her to have been, as Edgcumbe said, intelligent, observant, perceptive, though not unusually so, not to the "remarkable" extent perceived by their well-disposed editor."

=== The letter to Brown ===
There is a letter Fanny wrote to Charles Brown in 1829, granting him permission to reproduce for biographical purposes some letters and poems of Keats's concerning his relationship with her without using her name, which has caused scholars attempting to fit it into her life considerable difficulty—so much so, that the letter is virtually ignored in some major Keats biographies and written off as unimportant in others.

Of this letter, there are two passages in particular on which critics tend to focus. In the first, which is crossed out in the original manuscript, Fanny tells Brown: "I was more generous ten years ago, I should not now endure the odium of being connected with one who was working up his way against poverty and every sort of abuse." The second, which is not crossed out, reads: "I should be glad if you could disprove I was a very poor judge of character ten years ago and probably overrated every good quality he had but surely they go too far on the other side."

Joanna Richardson writes of the first remark: "One sentence, removed from its context and published by Dilke's grandson in 1875, was to rouse the indignation of half-informed critics for more than sixty years"; and that "it suggests the prolonged strain which she had felt during her engagement, and the emotional disturbance caused by her mother's recent death, but it is no evidence of a final change of heart." Walsh interprets the second remark to say just the opposite of what Richardson had argued: "Fanny is saying that, looking back, she finds her former high opinion of Keats as a man is no longer warranted: she had "overrated" him. As to why she changed her mind, there exists no direct hint (though it at least deserves recording that in the meantime she had become a fairly wealthy woman, inheriting from her brother who died in 1828, and from her mother). There are only her remarks about being "more generous" ten years before, and about not liking to recall how she once gave her heart to a little-known young poet struggling to find his way".

== See also ==
- Wentworth Place
- John Keats's 1819 odes
- John Keats bibliography
- Bright Star

== Bibliography ==
- Campion, Jane, ed. Bright Star: Love Letters and Poems of John Keats to Fanny Brawne. New York: Penguin Group, 2009. Print.
- Edgcumbe, Fred, ed. Letters of Fanny Brawne to Fanny Keats (1820–1824). New York: Oxford University Press, 1937. Print.
- Flament, Gale. Fanny Brawne reconsidered: A study of a fashion conscious woman of the middle class, 1800–1865. University of Akron, 2007 Fanny Brawne reconsidered. Accessed 2010-06-07
- Forman, Maurice Buxton, ed. The Letters of John Keats. 4th Edition. London: Oxford University Press, 1952. Print.
- Keats, John. Letter to George and Georgiana Keats. Dec.–Jan. 1818–1819. John Keats Collection, 1814–1891; MS Keats 1, Letters by John Keats. Houghton Library, Harvard University, Cambridge, Mass. Web. 19 April 2010. – Keats' Letters.
- Leal, Amy. "Keats and His 'Bright Star.'" Chronicle of Higher Education 56.6 (2009): B14–B15. MLA International Bibliography. Web. 20 February 2010.
- Le Gallienne, Richard. Old Love Stories Retold. Plymouth: The Mayflower Press, 1924. Print.
- Motion, Andrew. Keats. London: Faber and Faber, 1997. Print.
- Plumly, Stanley. Posthumous Keats: A Personal Biography. New York: W. W. Norton & Company, 2008. Print.
- Richardson, Joanna. Fanny Brawne: A Biography. Norwich: Jarrold and Sons, 1952. Print.
- Walsh, John Evangelist. Darkling, I Listen: The Last Days and Death of John Keats. New York: St. Martin's Press, 1999. Print.
