= Charles Armitage Brown =

British businessman (1787–1842)

Charles A. Brown
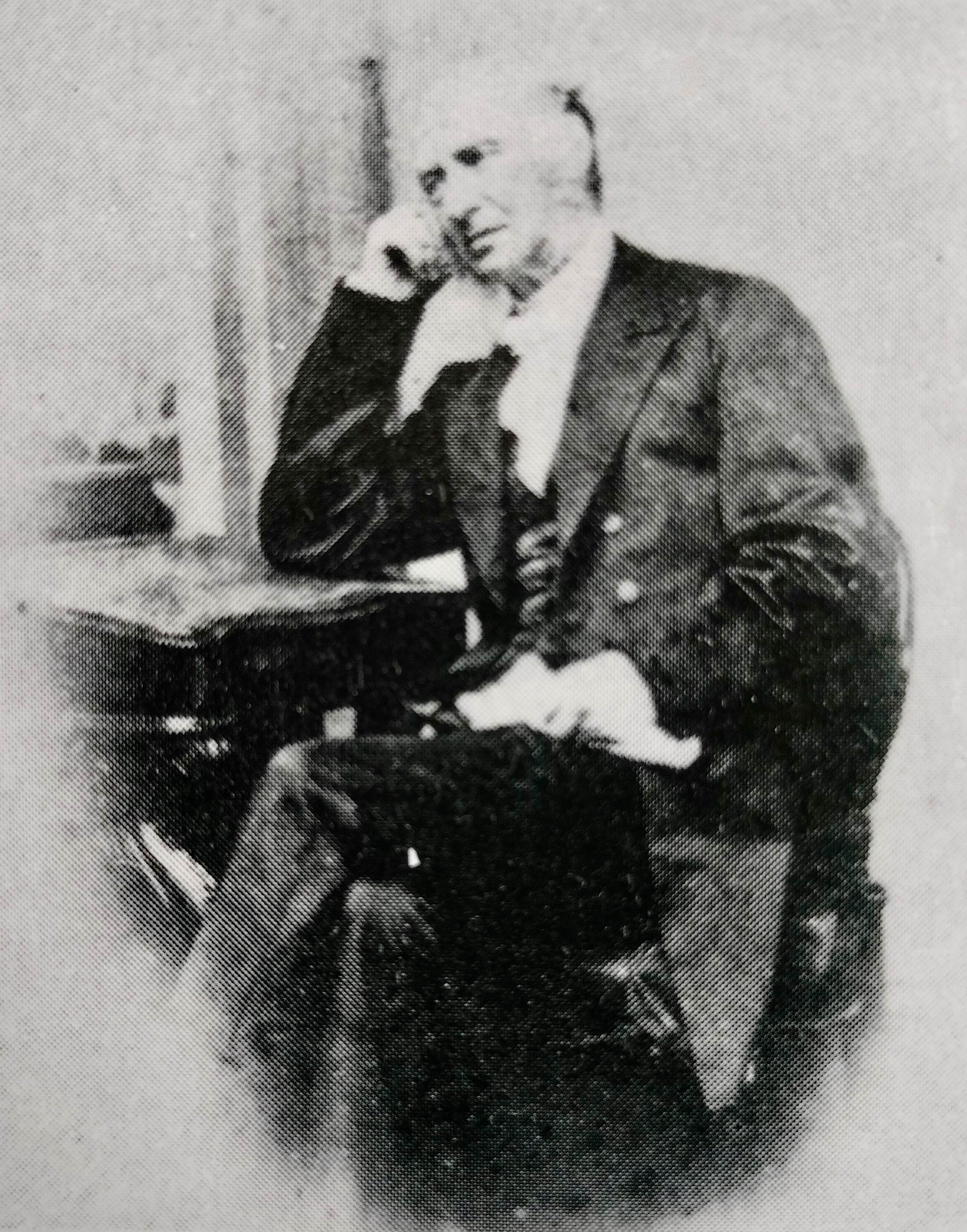
- Photograph reported to depict Brown, c. 1840
- Born: 17 April 1787; Lambeth, London, England
- Died: 5 June 1842 (aged 55); New Plymouth, New Zealand
- Occupation: Businessman
- Known for: Friend of John Keats

Charles Armitage Brown (14 April 1787 – 5 June 1842) was a close friend of the poet John Keats, as well as a friend of artist Joseph Severn, Leigh Hunt, Thomas Jefferson Hogg, Walter Savage Landor and Edward John Trelawny. He was the father of Charles (Carlino) Brown, a pioneer and politician of New Plymouth, New Zealand.

== Early life ==
Brown was born in Lambeth, London, England. He had very little formal education and to a large extent was self-taught. He began a career as a merchant, starting as a clerk at the age of fourteen, earning £40 per year. At eighteen he joined his brother in Saint Petersburg, Russia in a fur-trading business where they were to accumulate the sum of £20,000, only to lose most of it in an unwise speculation in bristles. They returned to England almost penniless, though Brown capitalized on his Russian experience by writing a comic opera, Narensky, or, The Road to Yaroslaf, which was produced at Drury Lane in January 1814, earning him £300 and free admission for life to this theatre.

== Friendship with John Keats ==
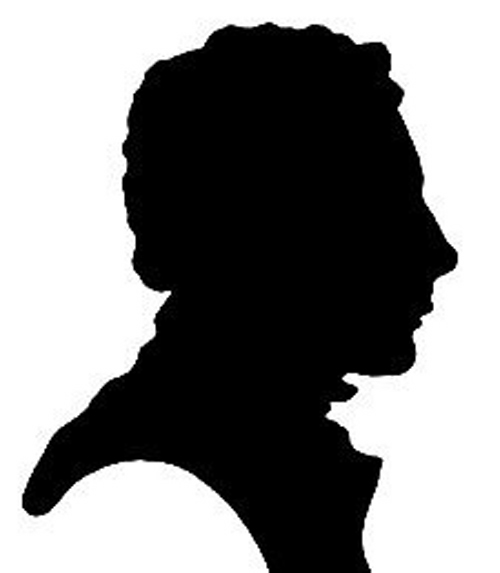
Silhouette of Keats by Charles Brown (1819), given to Keats's sister

Brown is best known for his close friendship with the poet John Keats. When Charles Brown first met Keats in the late summer of 1817, Keats was twenty-one, and Brown thirty.

Shortly after their meeting, Keats and Brown were planning to see Scotland together. Their famous tour was described in their letters and in "Walks in the North". In 1818, after Keats's brother died of tuberculosis (or consumption as it was called in his day), Keats moved into Brown's half of Wentworth Place, taking the front parlour, where he lived for the next seventeen months. During this time Brown collaborated with Keats on a play, Otho the Great, which was not staged until the 1950s.

Around 1890 Brown's son, Charles (Carlino) Brown said that Brown married Abigail O'Donohue (Note: Variously Donhaugh or Donohoo.) in a Roman Catholic ceremony in Ireland in August 1819, after Brown had left Keats at Winchester. Most biographers do not appear to believe that the marriage took place and feel that Carlino's story was motivated by a desire to cover up his illegitimacy, due to the social stigma it would cause Carlino as a leading citizen of New Plymouth. Also there is evidence that Brown was in Chichester while Keats was in Winchester.

After a severe haemorrhage in February 1820, Keats developed tuberculosis and Brown took care of him. This included handling all his affairs, paying his bills, writing his letters, even lending him money and standing as surety for a loan to him. Although Keats appeared to recover from the initial attack and the medical advice was that his lungs were sound, Keats's health fluctuated from that time on, gradually deteriorating.

On medical advice that he could not survive the cold of another English winter, Keats travelled to Rome, Italy on 17 September 1820. Although Keats had wanted Brown to accompany him, Brown had not returned from a holiday in Scotland by the date of Keats's departure and so, on just over three-day's notice, the artist Joseph Severn agreed to accompany Keats. Ironically (and unknown to them at the time), Brown's and Keats's ships were both moored at Gravesend on the same night as Brown returned to London and Keats departed to Italy.

Brown remained at Wentworth Place in Hampstead, London during Keats's final illness, writing and receiving letters from both Keats and Severn. He shared some of the contents of those letters with Keats's fiancee Fanny Brawne, but did not disclose any information that he thought might upset her too much. Severn nursed Keats through his final illness until the poet's death in Rome on 23 February 1821.

== Move to Italy ==
In July 1822, Charles Armitage Brown travelled to Italy with his son Carlino. It is not clear what became of Carlino's mother Abigail.

Brown lived in Pisa from 1822 to around 1824, after which he moved to Florence. He published many articles in English periodicals, the best-known being "Shakespeare's Fools" in 1823. For many years, he worked on his own autobiographical novel, Walter Hazlebourn, which he never finished.

In Italy, he moved in with Joseph Severn. His friend Leigh Hunt was there as well, and through him Brown was introduced to Lord Byron, John Taaffe, Jr. (friend of Byron and Shelley), Seymour Kirkup, Thomas Jefferson Hogg, Walter Savage Landor, and many others.

In 1829, Edward John Trelawny, whom Brown had met in 1823 (just before Byron had sailed to Greece) came to live with him in Florence. For half the profits from its publication, Brown rewrote Trelawny's Adventures of a Younger Son. Brown provided Trelawny with passages from Keats's unpublished poems to be used (with others from Shelley and Byron) as chapter headings. Unfortunately, this resulted in Trelawny being linked to Keats when he had actually never met him in person.

On 6 June 1834, Brown suffered an apoplectic fit in Vieusseux's Library, Palazzo Ferroni, Florence. Fortunately, a "surgeon with a lancet and bandage in his pocket" happened to be present and immediately administered a blood-letting (the normal treatment at that time) and he appeared to sustain no permanent damage from the incident. However, he died eight years later from an apoplectic stroke.

== Return to England ==
On 30 March 1835, Brown left Italy to return to England in order to provide a better education for his son Carlino, who was talented in mathematics and wished to pursue a career in civil engineering. He settled in Plymouth, Devonshire.

== Emigration to New Zealand ==
In 1840, Brown became a shareholder in the newly formed Plymouth Company, which aimed to colonise New Plymouth, New Zealand. Shortly afterwards, his finances were ruined when he was forced to repay a friend's loan having agreed to be guarantor. With what little fortune remained to him, Brown decided that they should emigrate to New Plymouth as a pioneer community to provide the best opportunities for his son Charles as a civil engineer. His son Charles emigrated on the Amelia Thompson, the first settler ship of the Plymouth Company arriving in 1841 aged 17 years old. Brown followed on a second ship Oriental arriving three weeks later.

Before leaving for New Zealand, in 1841, he turned over copies of the unpublished poems of Keats to Richard Monckton Milnes.

When Brown arrived in New Plymouth, his disappointment was profound. Unlike its namesake in England, this Plymouth was wilderness, with a treacherous coast instead of a harbour. He proposed an early return to England.

His last letters from New Plymouth, New Zealand, dated 22 and 23 January, were addressed to Joseph Severn and Trelawny. In a letter to Trelawny he described himself as a deist.

== Death ==
Brown died from an apoplectic stroke on 5 June 1842 aged fifty-five at New Plymouth.

He was buried on the slope of Marsland Hill in New Plymouth above the original St Mary's Church; the grave was marked by a slab of stone taken from the beach. However, it was obscured when the top of the hill was flattened to allow for the construction of a barracks during the New Zealand Wars. The centenary of Keats's death aroused interest in finding Brown's grave and it was successfully relocated in March 1921 and marked by a stone inscribed, "Charles Armitage Brown. The friend of Keats." The grave, surrounded by vegetation, was painted as a site of historical interest by Taranaki artist Thelma de Lancy-Green. On 2 April 2011 leading Keats scholar Professor Nicholas Roe from the University of St Andrews, Scotland laid a wreath on Brown's grave and discussed the friendship between the pair. Professor Roe also visited Puke Ariki museum and library to explore the books that accompanied Charles Brown when he emigrated in 1841, including numerous editions of Romantic-period plays and an edition of Tasso known to have been among Keats's books at his death. This volume, which once belonged to Keats, also contains the bookplate and annotations of Charles Cowden Clarke, an author and Shakespearean scholar who taught Keats and encouraged his poetic leanings.

Although the emigration to New Plymouth was not successful, Brown's wish that his son Carlino (known as Charles in New Zealand) would prosper there was fulfilled, as Charles went on to become a prominent businessman, military man and politician.

The descendants of Charles Brown in New Zealand inherited items of John Keats memorabilia and many of these have been donated to the Keats House museum.

== Popular culture ==
The 2009 film Bright Star, written and directed by Jane Campion, focuses on Keats's relationship with Fanny Brawne. In it, according to critic Ty Burr (The Boston Globe), Brown (played by actor Paul Schneider) is presented as "the closest the movie comes to a villain, a cynical boor who knocks up his housemaid (Antonia Campbell-Hughes) and banishes Fanny so the boys can work on their plays and poems." Burr does however go on to emphasize that this portrayal of Brown's "love for Keats humanizes him... even if he loves the art more at first." Abigail O'Donohue, Brown's housemaid in the film, becomes pregnant and has his child. Yet many film critics and the filmmaker herself have felt that Brown was imbued with many qualities, including loyalty and wit, and in reality there was no villain, just real life humans. A new online edition of Brown's letters to Joseph Severn reveals that he was a complex figure with a tremendous capacity for friendship and loyalty.

== Sources ==
- Lee, Sidney (1886). "Brown, Charles Armitage" . In Stephen, Leslie (ed.). Dictionary of National Biography. Vol. 7. London: Smith, Elder & Co. pp. 1–2.
- Charles Armitage Brown, Shakespeare's Autobiographical Poems, London: J. Bohn, 1838
- Letters of Edward John Trelawny, edited by H. Buxton Forman, London: Oxford University Press, 1910.
- Life of John Keats, by Charles Armitage Brown, edited by Dorothy Hyde Bodurtha and W. B. Pope, London: Oxford University Press, 1937.
- Some Letters & Miscellanea of Charles Brown. The friend of John Keats & Thomas Richards, edited by H. Buxton Forman, London: Oxford University Press, 1937.
- Hector Bolitho and John Mulgan. The Emigrants. Early Travellers to the Antipodes. Freeport, New York: Books for Libraries, 1970 (reprint of the 1939 ed.)
- The Letters of Charles Armitage Brown, edited by Jack Stillinger, Cambridge, MA: Harvard University Press, 1966.
- E. H. McCormick, The Friend of Keats: A Life of Charles Armitage Brown, Wellington, New Zealand: Victoria University Press, 1989.
- Gillian Iles, "New Information on Keats's Friend Charles 'Armitage' Brown and the Brown Family", Keats-Shelley Journal 49 (1991): 146–166.
- New Letters from Charles Brown to Joseph Severn, edited by Grant F. Scott and Sue Brown. College Park, Maryland: Romantic Circles, 2007; revised 2010.
- Sue Brown, Joseph Severn, A Life: The Rewards of Friendship, Oxford: Oxford University Press, 2009.
- Carol Kyros Walker, Walking North with Keats, Yale University Press, 1992. Retraces the journey of Keats and Brown through Scotland.
