= Keats Listening to a Nightingale on Hampstead Heath =

Painting by Joseph Severn

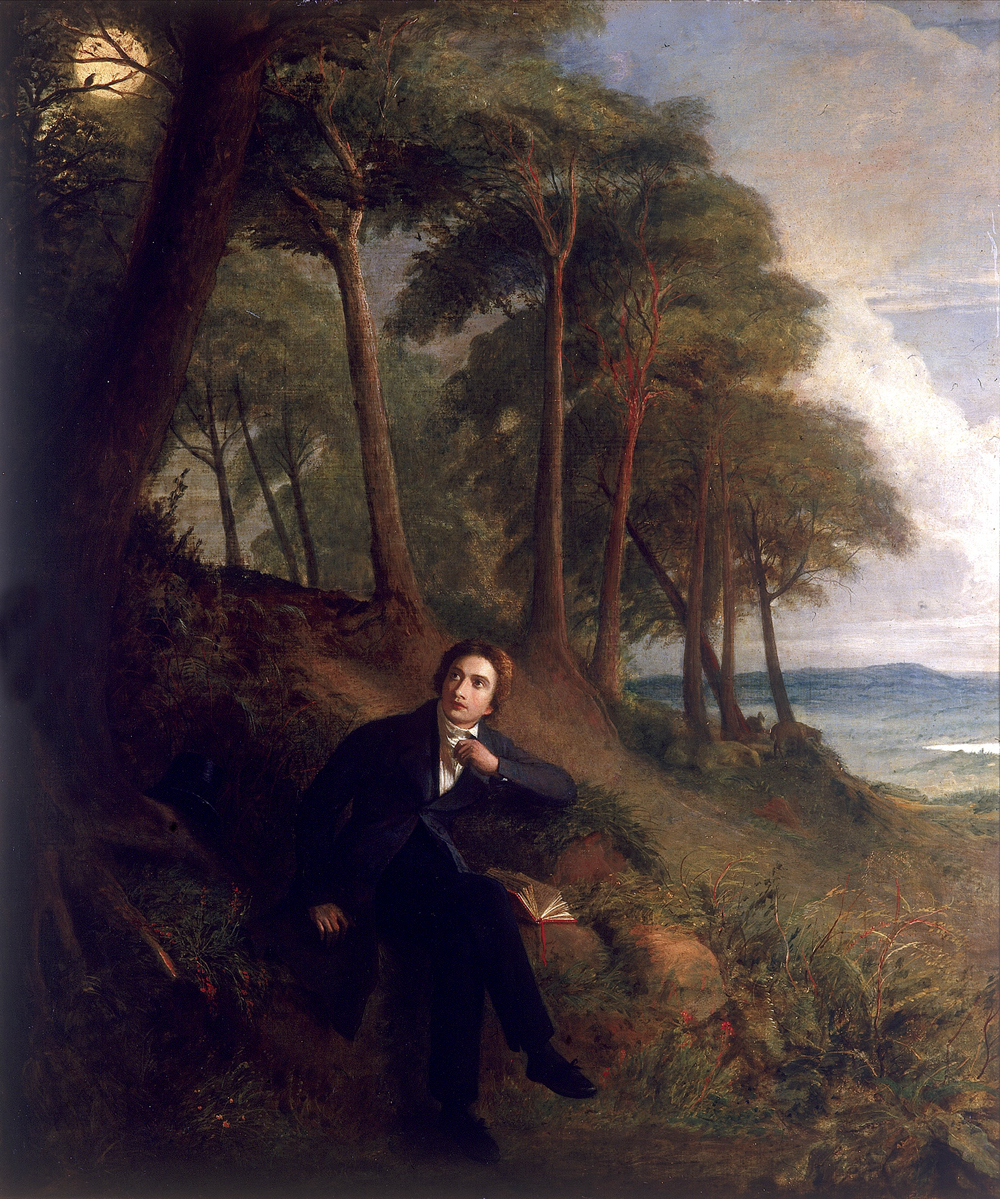
- Artist: Joseph Severn
- Year: 1845
- Type: Oil on canvas, history painting
- Dimensions: 114 cm × 97 cm (45 in × 38 in)
- Location: Guildhall Art Gallery; London

Keats Listening to a Nightingale on Hampstead Heath is an 1845 oil painting by the British artist Joseph Severn. It depicts the romantic poet John Keats hearing the song of a nightingale on Hampstead Heath and being inspired to write his famous 1819 work Ode to a Nightingale. Severn had been friends with Keats who had died of tuberculosis in Rome in 1821.

Today the painting is in the collection of the Guildhall Art Gallery in London, having been acquired in 1951. It is on display at Keats House in Hampstead.

== Bibliography ==
- Benton, Michael J. Literary Biography: An Introduction. John Wiley & Sons, 2015.
- Brown, Sue. Joseph Severn, A Life: The Rewards of Friendship. OUP, 2009.
- Burkett, Andrew. Romantic Mediations: Media Theory and British Romanticism. State University of New York Press, 2016.
