= Seymour Kirkup =

Seymour Stocker Kirkup (1788–1880) was an English painter and antiquarian, resident in Italy from 1816.

== Life ==
Born in London, he was the eldest child of Joseph Kirkup, a jeweller and diamond merchant there. He was admitted a student of the Royal Academy in 1809, and obtained a medal in 1811 for a drawing in its antique school. He became at this period acquainted with William Blake and Benjamin Haydon.

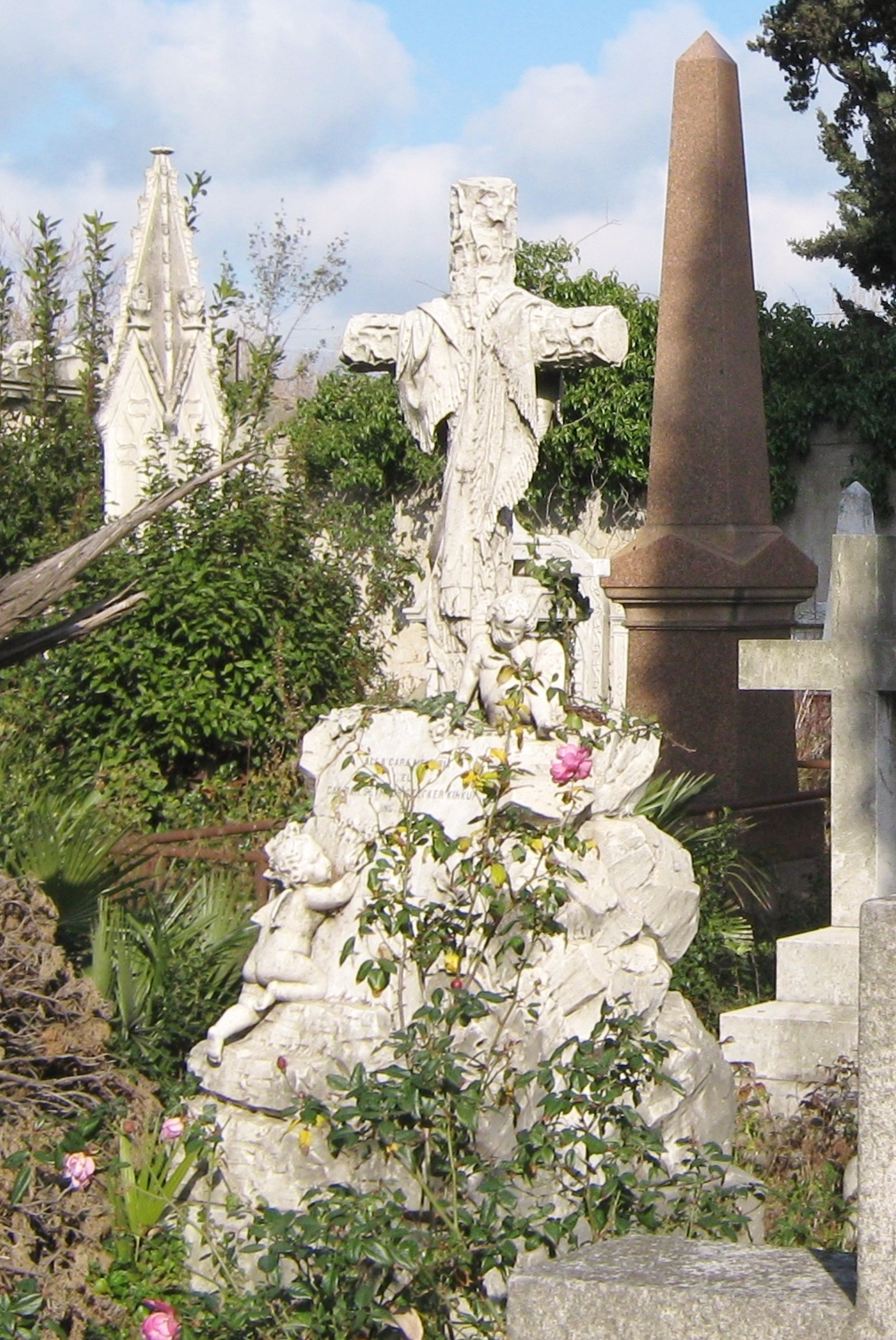
Grave of Seymour Stocker in Livorno

About 1816 Kirkup began to suffer from pulmonary weakness, and; after his father's death, visited Italy. He eventually settled there, living some time at Rome, where his friend Charles Eastlake was studying. There he knew John Keats (but missed his funeral on 26 February 1821, ill in bed) and in 1822 attended the funeral of Percy Bysshe Shelley. At Florence he lived for many years in a house on the River Arno, adjoining the Ponte Vecchio.

Kirkup became a leader of a literary circle in Florence and took up residence at the Casa Carovana, a palazzo near the Ponte Vecchio. He collected a library, of which a catalogue was printed in 1871, and maintained a copious correspondence. Walter Savage Landor, Robert and Elizabeth Browning, Giovanni Aubrey Bezzi, Edward John Trelawny, Joseph Severn were his friends. As a keen student of Dante, he was a disciple of Gabriele Rossetti.

On Italian unification, Kirkup was created cavaliere of the Order of Saints Maurice and Lazarus; he subsequently affected the title "barone". He was short, and good-looking as a young man; in later life, eccentric in his dress and habits, and deaf. He was a believer in spiritualism, and a follower of the medium Daniel Dunglas Home.

Kirkup died at 4 Via Scali del Ponte Nuovo, Livorno, where he had lived since 1872, on 3 January 1880, and was buried on 5 January in the British cemetery there.

== Works ==
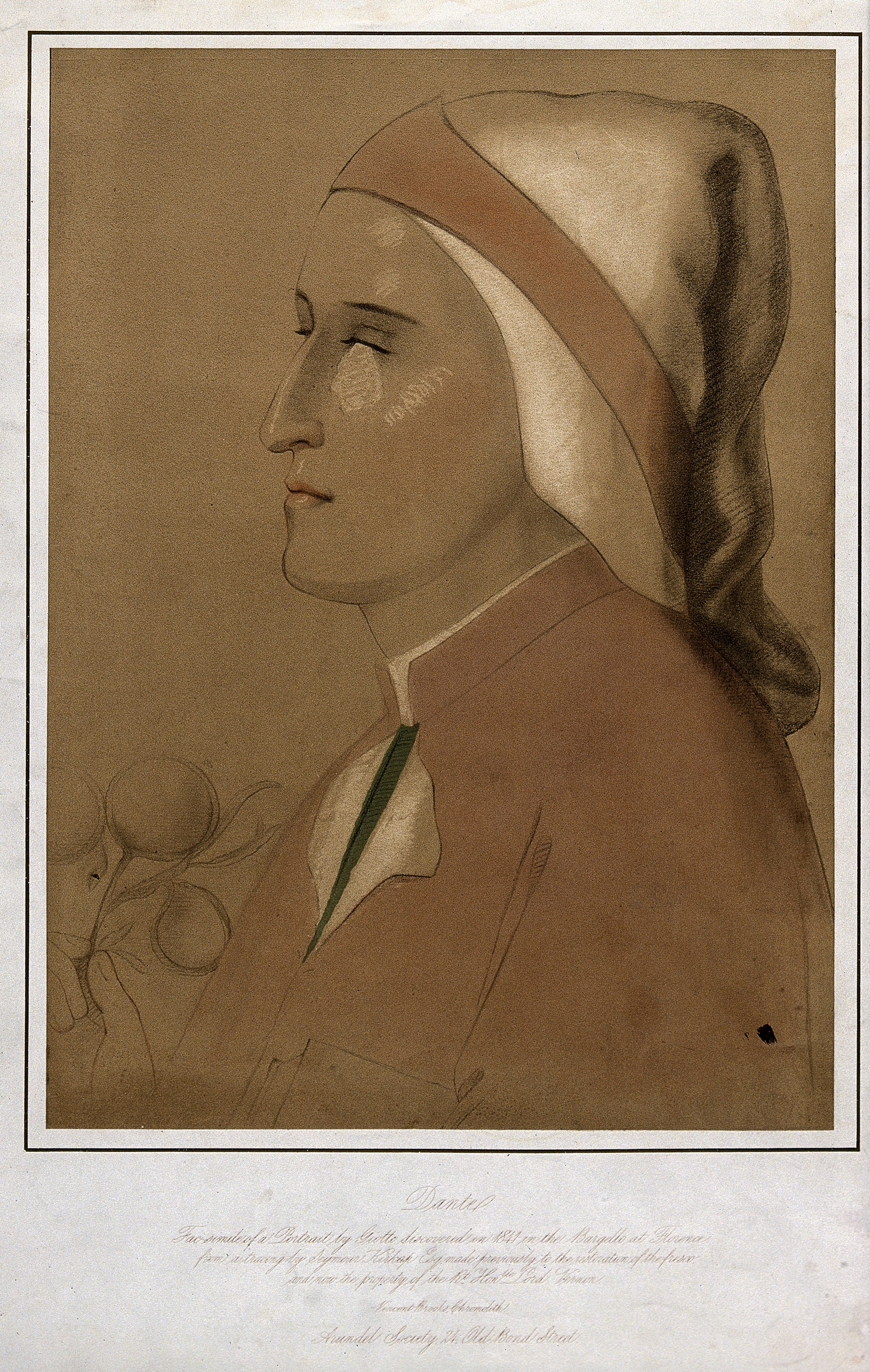
Dante Alighieri, 1859 lithograph, after Seymour Kirkup, after a fresco attributed to Giotto

Kirkup was a capable artist, but practised painting as a dilettante. He sent to the Royal Academy in 1833 a picture "Cassio", and in 1836 a lady's portrait. He also published etchings. He drew many portraits of his friends, including Trelawny and the journalist John Scott, and in 1844 made a self-portrait.

In 1840 Kirkup, Bezzi, and the American Henry Wilde, had permission to search for the portrait of Dante, painted according to tradition by Giotto, in the chapel of the Palazzo del Podestà in Florence. On 21 July 1840 they found it, and Kirkup made a drawing and tracing, before restoration work in 1841. The Arundel Society issued a reproduction from Kirkup's sketch, which was also engraved by P. Lasinio. Kirkup gave the tracing to Rossetti, who handed it on to his son Dante Gabriel Rossetti, and it was sold after the latter's death. Kirkup made some of the designs for Lord Vernon's edition of Dante's works.

== Family ==
Kirkup, by his first wife, Regina Ronti of Florence, who died 30 October 1856, aged 19, had a daughter, Imogene who married Teodoro Cioni of Livorno and who died in 1878, leaving two children. On 16 February 1875, at the age of 87, Kirkup married Paolina Carboni, aged 22, daughter of Pasquale Carboni, English vice-consul at Rome. After he died she married Signor Morandi of Bologna.
