= Joseph Severn =

English painter

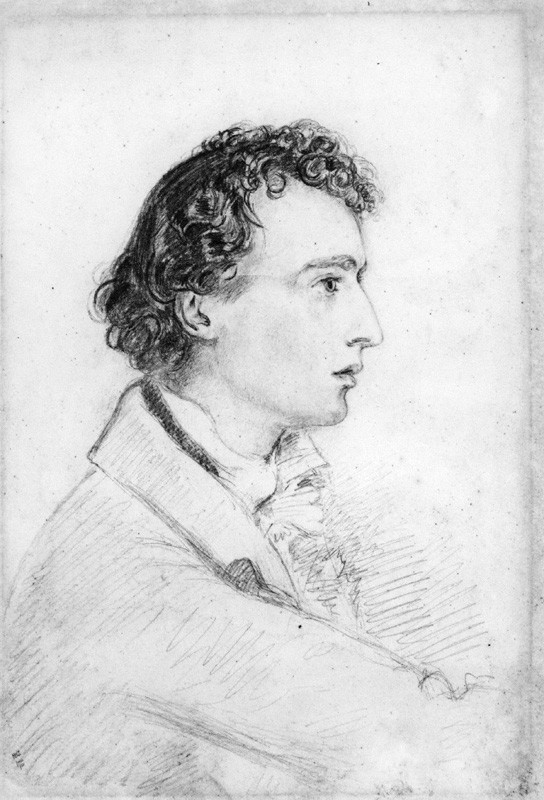
Joseph Severn (self-portrait)

Joseph Severn (7 December 1793 – 3 August 1879) was an English portrait and subject painter and a personal friend of the English poet John Keats. He exhibited portraits, Italian genre, literary and biblical subjects, and a selection of his paintings can today be found in some of the most important museums in London, including the National Portrait Gallery, the Victoria and Albert Museum and Tate Britain.

== Background ==
The eldest son of a music teacher, Severn was born in Hoxton, near London, and apprenticed at the age of 14 to William Bond, an engraver. Severn was one of seven children; two of his brothers, Thomas (1801–1881) and Charles (1806–1894), became professional musicians, and Severn himself was an adroit pianist. During his early years he practised portraiture as a miniaturist.

== Early years in London 1815-1820 ==
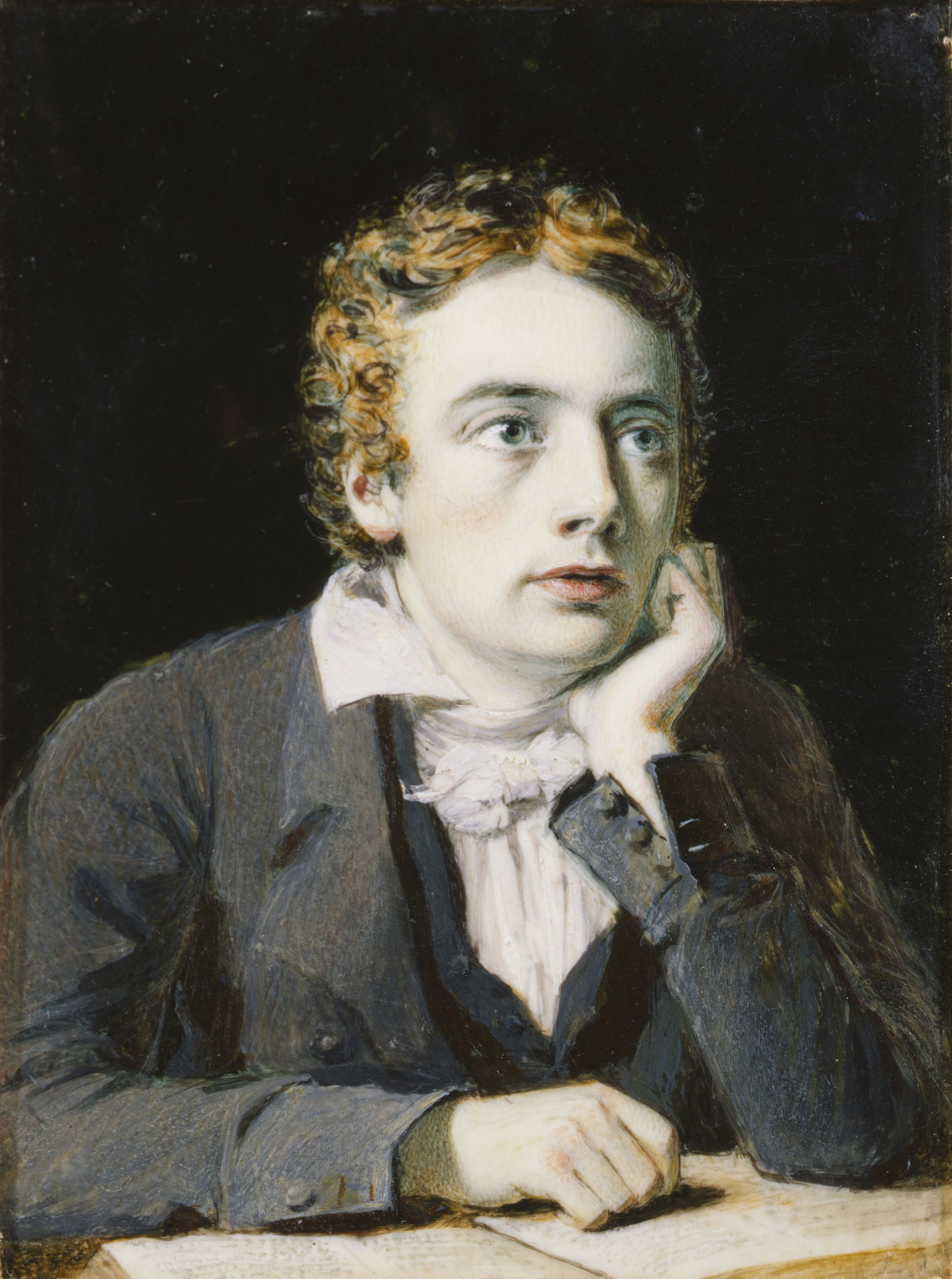
John Keats by Severn 1819

In 1815, he was admitted to the Royal Academy Schools in London and exhibited his first work in oil, Hermia and Helena, a subject from A Midsummer Night's Dream, along with a portrait miniature, J. Keats, Esq, in the Royal Academy Exhibition of 1819. He probably first met the poet John Keats in the spring of 1816.

In 1819, Severn was awarded the gold medal of the Royal Academy for his painting Una and the Red Cross Knight in the Cave of Despair which was inspired by the epic poem The Faerie Queene by Edmund Spenser. It was the first time the prize had been awarded in eight years, and the painting was exhibited at the Academy in 1820. This award also allowed Severn to apply for a three years' travelling studentship, paid for by the Royal Academy. The painting was purchased by Lord Houghton, the first biographer of Keats; although it was recorded as sold by Christie's in June 1963, it has since disappeared from public view and there are no reproductions of it in the public domain.

According to a new edition of Severn's letters and memoirs, Severn fathered an illegitimate child named Henry (b. 31 Aug 1819) about a year before leaving England for Italy. In 1826 there were plans for father and son to reunite, but Henry died, aged 11, before he could make the journey to Rome.

== Journey to Italy with John Keats, 1820–1821 ==
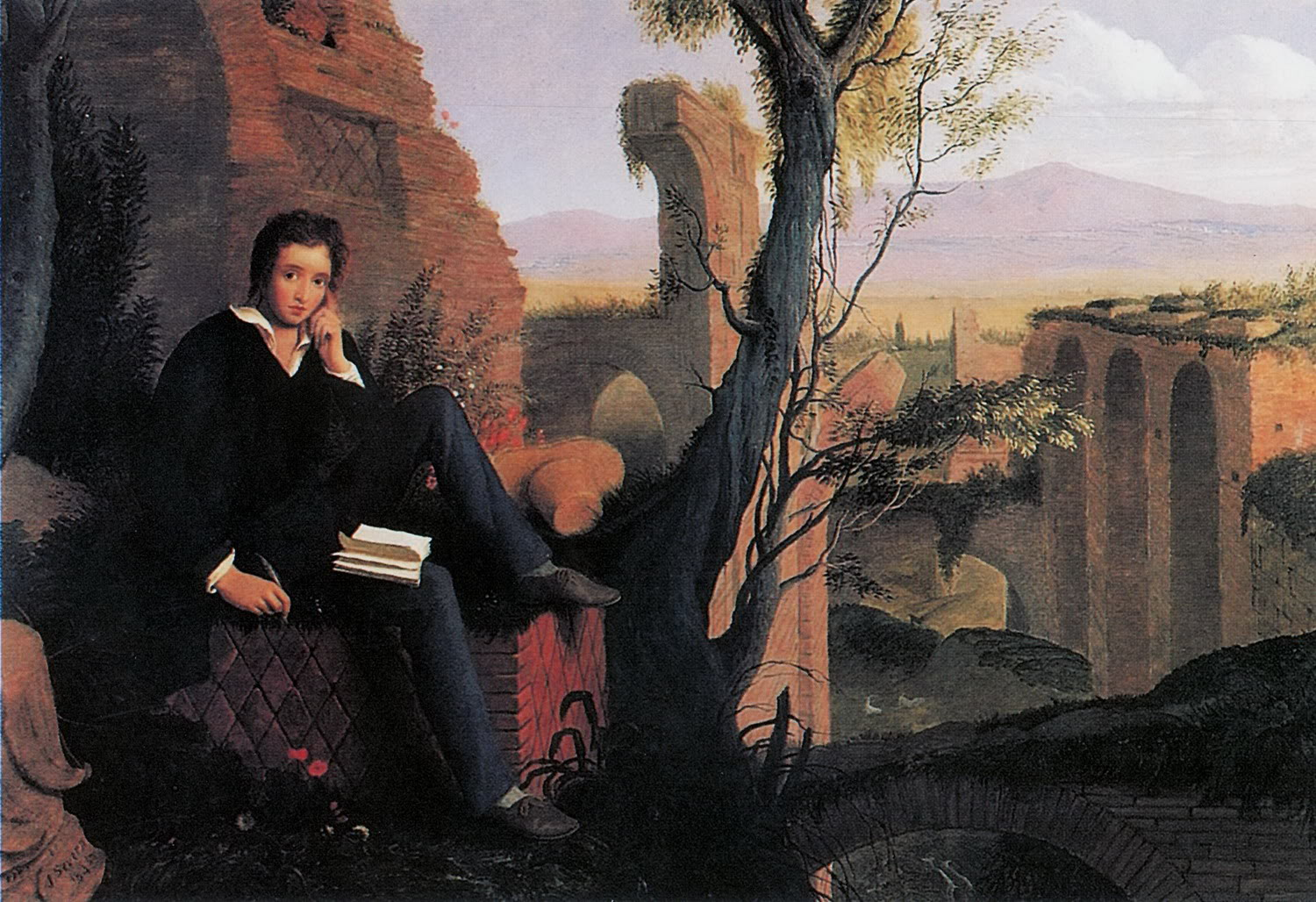
Posthumous Portrait of Shelley Writing Prometheus Unbound (1845)

On 17 September 1820, Severn set sail aboard the Maria Crowther from England to Italy with the English poet John Keats. Keats and Severn had known one another in England, but they were only passing acquaintances. Yet it was Severn who agreed to accompany the poet to Rome when all others could, or would, not. The trip was intended to cure Keats's lingering illness, which he suspected was tuberculosis; however, his friends and several doctors disagreed and urged him to spend some time in a warm climate. After a harrowing voyage, they arrived in the Bay of Naples on 21 October, only to be placed in quarantine for ten days. The two men remained in Naples for a week before travelling to Rome in a small carriage, where they arrived mid-November 1820 and met Keats's physician, Dr. James Clark. In Rome they lived in an apartment at number 26 Piazza di Spagna, just at the bottom right of the Spanish Steps and overlooking Bernini's Barcaccia fountain.

Severn had left England against his father's wishes and with little money. In fact, his father was so incensed by his departure that, as Severn reported in a late memoir, "in his insane rage he struck me a blow which fell me to the ground." He was never to see his father again. While in Rome during the winter of 1820-21, Severn wrote numerous letters about Keats to their mutual friends in England, in particular William Haslam and Charles Armitage Brown, who then shared them with other members of the Keats circle, including the poet's fiancée, Fanny Brawne. These journal-letters now represent the only surviving account of the poet's final months and as a consequence are used as the primary historical source for biographers of Keats' last days.

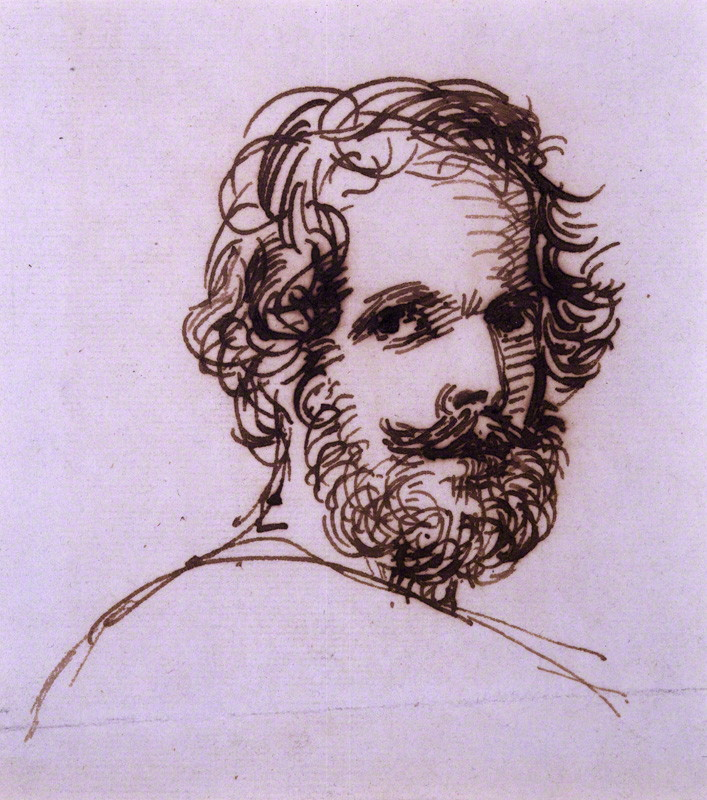
Edward John Trelawny, by Severn

Severn nursed Keats until his death on 23 February 1821, three months after they had arrived in Rome. As he reported to John Taylor two weeks afterwards, "Each day he would look up in the doctors face to discover how long he should live -- he would say -- "how long will this posthumous life of mine last"—that look was more than we could ever bear—the extreme brightness of his eyes—with his poor pallid face—were not earthly --" Severn's ordeal was recognised by Keats himself, who, a month before his death, said, "Severn I can see under your quiet look -- immense twisting and contending -- you dont know what you are reading -- you are induring [sic] for me more than I'd have you -- O! that my last hour was come --" He was later thanked for his devotion by the poet Percy B. Shelley in the preface to his elegy, Adonais, which was written for Keats in 1821. It was also at this time that Severn met, among other notables, the sculptors John Gibson and Antonio Canova, and Lord Byron's friend, the adventurer Edward John Trelawny. Severn made a sketch of Trelawny in 1838.

== Life and work after the death of Keats ==
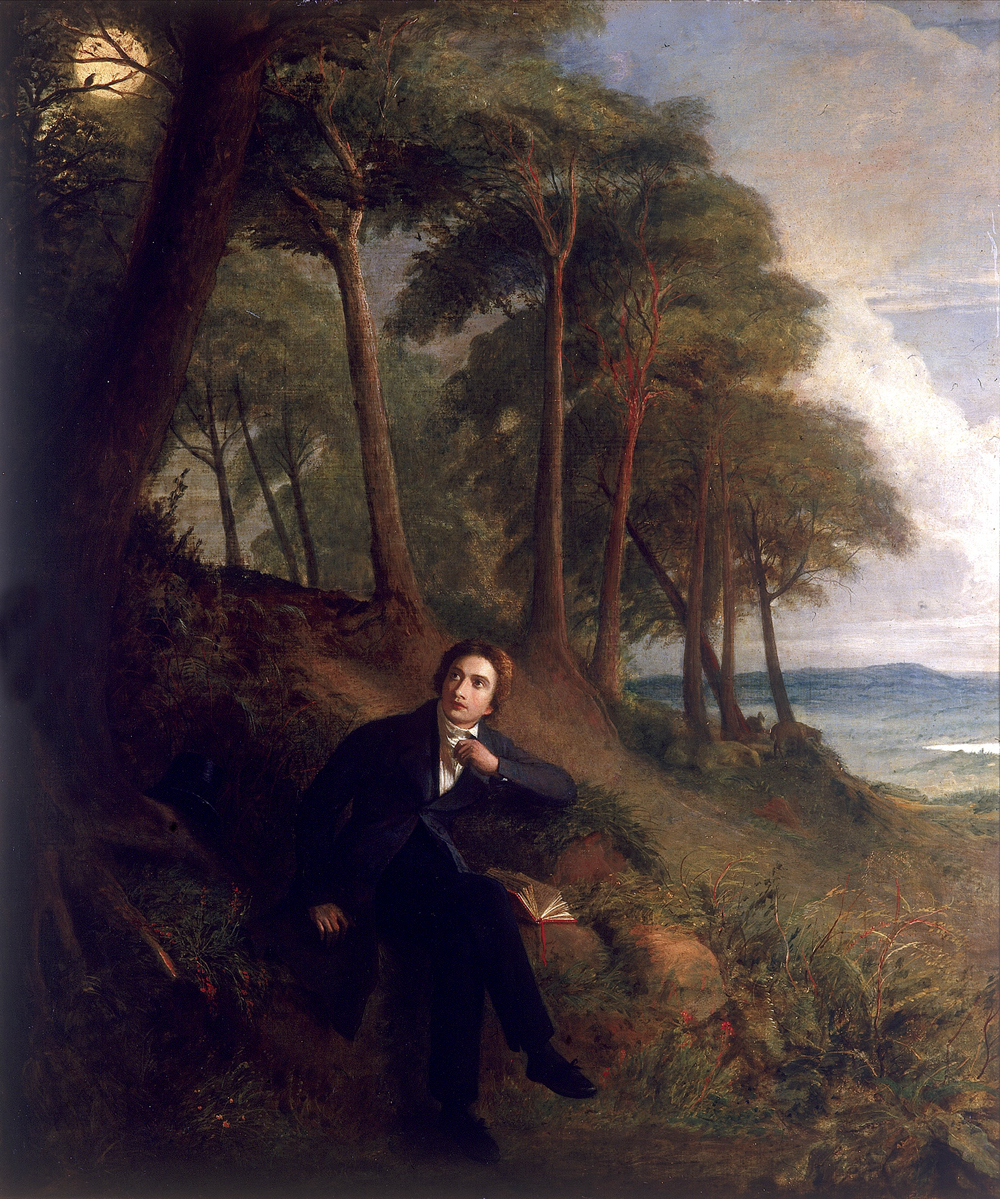
Keats Listening to a Nightingale on Hampstead Heath, 1845

Until recently, it was believed that Severn's life culminated in his association with Keats and that he lived on this fame for the rest of his long life. In reality, Severn launched his own successful artistic career soon after Keats died, becoming a versatile painter in Rome during the 1820s and 1830s. He painted miniatures and altarpieces, landscapes and frescoes, historical and religious scenes, and subjects from the Bible, Greek mythology and Shakespeare. His pictures of Italian peasant life and pastoral genre scenes became very popular with British visitors on the continent and attracted many commissions for his work.

Severn was also instrumental in helping to found the British Academy of Arts in Rome, which drew the support of such influential figures as the Duke of Devonshire, John Flaxman and Sir Thomas Lawrence. Severn's spacious apartment in the Via di San Isidoro became the busy centre of Academy life. Among those who joined the academy were Charles Eastlake, Richard Westmacott (the younger), William Bewick and Thomas Uwins. Perhaps the most dedicated patron of Severn's work in the 1830s was William Gladstone, who was drawn to Severn more for his reputation as a painter than as Keats's friend.

On his return to England in 1841 Severn fell on hard times, trying desperately to earn enough money to support his growing family by painting portraits. Although he was never able to match his early artistic success in Rome and eventually had to flee his creditors for the Isle of Jersey in 1853, between 1819 and 1857, Severn exhibited 53 paintings at the Royal Academy in London.

In 1861, Severn was appointed British Consul in Rome during the ferment over Italian unification. A few months before his arrival Garibaldi had seized the Kingdom of Naples, and all of Southern Italy and Sicily had been annexed to the new Kingdom of Italy. Many of the kingdoms, principalities and dukedoms in the Italian peninsula had come together under the leadership of Victor Emmanuel II, but Rome and its surroundings remained as the rump of the Papal States. This was the case throughout the majority of Severn's tenure as Consul, as Pope Pius IX managed to retain a fragile hold on power, relying on a garrison of French troops to control Rome. Although the official position of the British government on "The Roman Question" was neutrality and nonintervention, Severn often took diplomatic action that his superiors viewed as exceeding his mandate as Consul. On several occasions, such as when he used his office to liberate Italian political prisoners in 1864, he was rebuked by the Foreign Office. His knowledge of the Italian language and his affability and good humour, however, often helped in mediating between the papal regime and the British government. He welcomed British visitors to Rome, such as Elizabeth Barrett Browning and Robert Browning, telling them about the time he nursed Keats, and he was able on many occasions to offer advice and protection for British visitors who found themselves in awkward scrapes. He eventually retired as Consul in 1872.

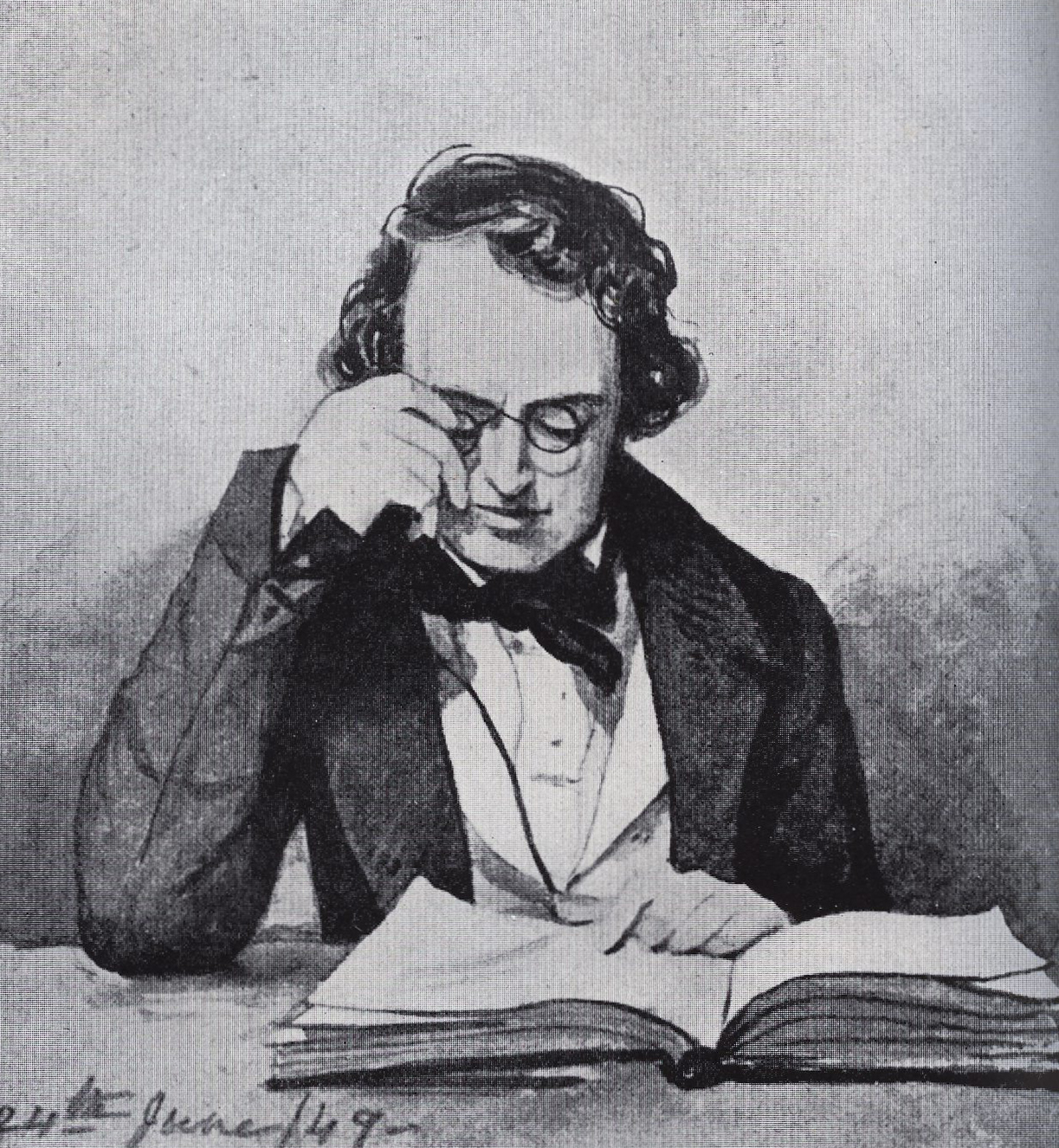
Severn drawn by his daughter Mary

== Marriage and family ==
In 1828 Severn married Elizabeth Montgomerie, the natural (i.e. illegitimate) daughter of Archibald, Lord Montgomerie (1773–1814) and the ward of the Countess of Westmoreland, one of the artist's patrons in Rome. Together they had seven children, three of whom became noteworthy artists: Walter and Arthur Severn, and Ann Mary Newton, who married the archeologist and Keeper of Antiquities at the British Museum, Charles Thomas Newton. Mary had a successful painting career in England, supporting the family for a time, and executing a number of portraits of the Royal Family. Her early death from measles at the age of 32 affected Severn. In 1871, Arthur Severn married Joan Ruskin Agnew, a cousin of the Victorian art and social critic John Ruskin. The Severns had another child, Arthur, who died as an infant in a crib accident. He is buried between Keats and Severn in the Acatholic Cemetery in Rome.

== Death ==
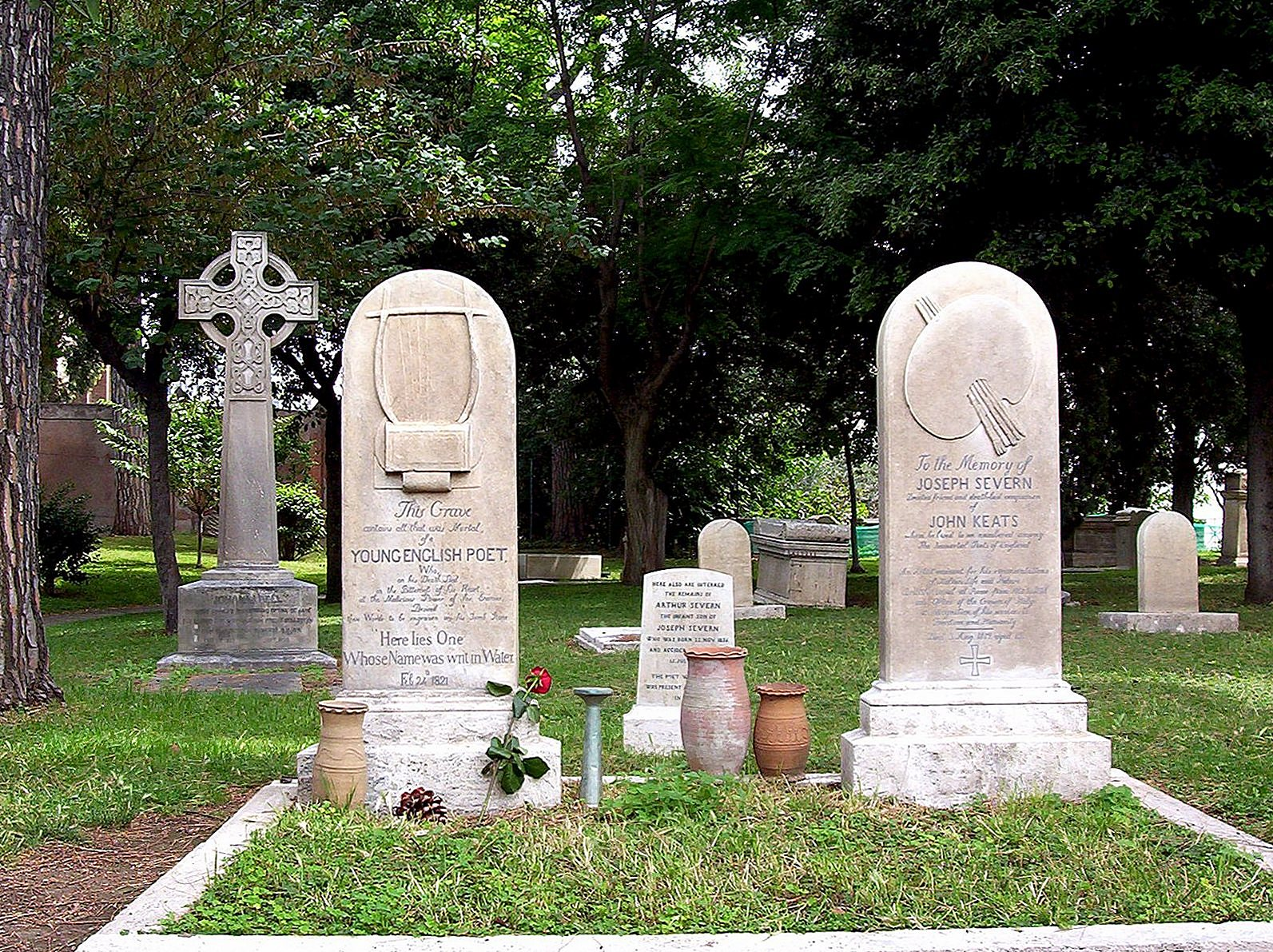
Keats and Severn graves at the Protestant Cemetery in Rome. Severn's tombstone is on the right. Severn's stele is ornamented with a palette in low relief, and Keats' with a lyre.

Severn died on 3 August 1879 at the age of 85, and was buried in the Protestant Cemetery alongside John Keats. Both gravestones are still standing today. Shelley and Trelawny are also buried side by side in the same cemetery.

== Paintings ==
Severn is best known for his many portraits of Keats, the most famous being the miniature portrait in The Fitzwilliam Museum (1819), the pen-and-ink sketch, Keats on his Deathbed (1821), in the Keats-Shelley house, Rome, and the oil painting of the poet reading, John Keats at Wentworth Place (1821–23), in the National Portrait Gallery. A later painting, Keats, at Hampstead, when he first imagined his Ode to a Nightingale (1849), now at Keats House, is also notable. In the 1860s Severn produced a number of copies and memory portraits as Keats' reputation continued to grow. The most influential of Severn's early Italian genre paintings are The Vintage, commissioned by the Duke of Bedford in 1825, and The Fountain (Royal Palace, Brussels) commissioned by Leopold I of Belgium in 1826. The latter picture probably influenced J. M. W. Turner's major work, View of Orvieto. One of his most remarkably inventive works is the Rime of the Ancient Mariner (1839), based on Samuel Coleridge's famous poem, which recently sold at Sotheby's for £32,400. Another historical subject, The Abdication of Mary, Queen of Scots, sold for £115,250 at Sotheby's Gleneagles sale on 26 August 2008.

Severn also painted such works as Cordelia Watching by the Bed of Lear, Shepherds in the Campagna, Shelley Composing Prometheus Unbound, Isabella and the Pot of Basil, Portia with the Casket, Ariel, Rienzi, The Infant of the Apocalypse Saved from the Dragon, a large altarpiece for the church of San Paolo fuori le Mura at Rome, and many portraits of statesman and aristocrats, including Baron Bunsen and William Gladstone. The last picture he exhibited at the Royal Academy was a scene from Oliver Goldsmith's The Deserted Village in 1857.

== Biographies and books ==
In 1892 the first significant collection of Severn's papers was published by William Sharp in The Life and Letters of Joseph Severn. Modern critics have cast doubt on the accuracy of Sharp's transcriptions and noted important omissions and embellishments.

In 1965, Sheila Birkenhead published Illustrious Friends: The story of Joseph Severn and his son Arthur.

In 2005, Grant F. Scott published Joseph Severn: Letters and Memoirs in which he re-edited the original material, added hundreds of newly discovered letters, included numerous reproductions of Severn's paintings, and prefaced this material with a critical introduction and commentary.

In 2009, Sue Brown published the biography Joseph Severn, A Life: The Rewards of Friendship using Scott's new information to provide a reassessment of Severn's character, his friendship with Keats, and his own subsequent artistic and diplomatic career.
