= View of Orvieto =

Painting by J. M. W. Turner

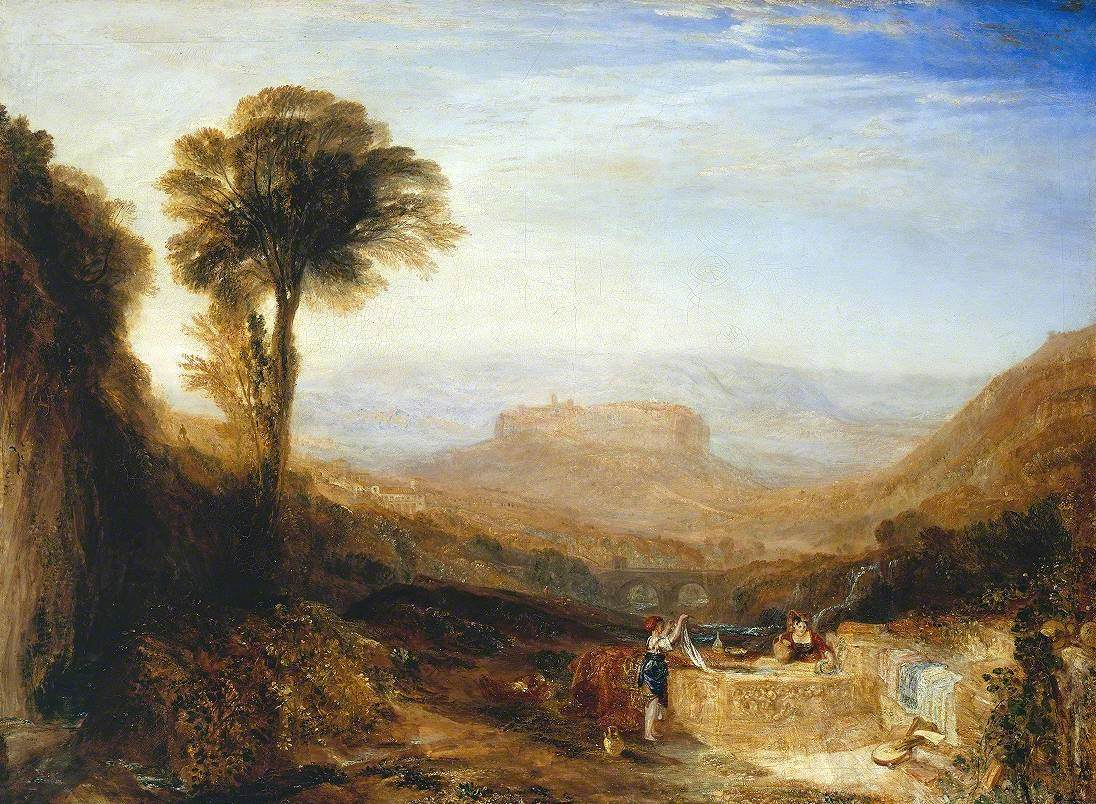
- Artist: J. M. W. Turner
- Year: 1828
- Type: Oil on canvas, landscape painting
- Dimensions: 123.2 cm × 91.4 cm (48.5 in × 36.0 in)
- Location: Tate Britain, London
- Accession: N00511
- Website: www.tate.org.uk/art/artworks/turner-view-of-orvieto-painted-in-rome-n00511

View of Orvieto is an 1828 landscape painting by the British artist J. M. W. Turner. It features a view of the town of Orvieto in Umbria. Turner was making his second visit to Rome and had passed through Orvieto during his journey. He exhibited the painting in his studio in Rome. In 1830 he displayed the work again at the Royal Academy's Summer Exhibition at Somerset House. Today the painting is in the collection of the Tate Britain, having been part of the Turner Bequest of 1856.

== See also ==
- List of paintings by J. M. W. Turner

== Bibliography ==
- Bailey, Anthony. J.M.W. Turner: Standing in the Sun. Tate Enterprises, 2013.
- Herrmann, Luke. Nineteenth Century British Painting. Charles de la Mare, 2000.
- Michaelides, Chris. Rome. Clio Press, 2000.
