= Keats House =

Romantic poet John Keats' house and museum in north London

Coordinates: 51°33′20″N 0°10′06″W

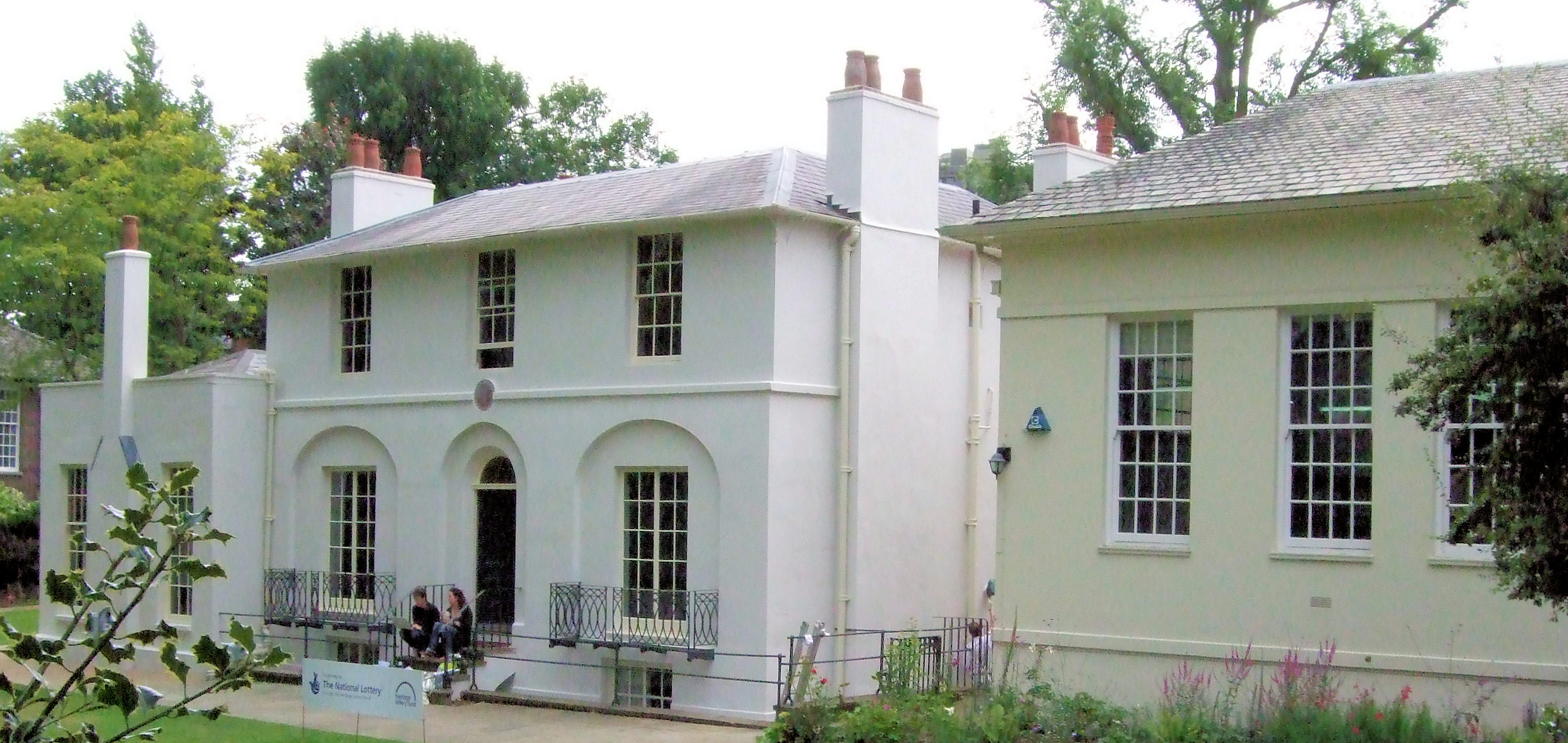
- Keats House, Keats Grove (formerly John Street), pictured prior to reopening in 2009 after restoration. Adjoining on the right is the Heath Branch Public Library

- Location within London Borough of Camden
- Former names: Wentworth Place; Wentworth Cottage; Lawn Cottage; Laurel Cottage; Lawn Bank (Note: The house was named "Wentworth Place" in 1818 by William Dilke and Mrs. Maria Dilke during Charles Wentworth Dilke's absence. Dilke's half of the house was briefly known as "Wentworth Cottage" during 1838. The house was again known as "Wentworth Place" until 1842. It then had several changes of name: "Lawn Cottage" (1843–44); "Laurel Cottage" (1845–49); "Lawn Cottage" (1849–67) and "Lawn Bank" from 1868 until it was officially renamed "Wentworth Place" in 1924 so that, although known as Keats House, the house also retains the name that Keats and his friends would have been familiar with.)

General information
- Architectural style: Regency
- Location: 10 Keats Grove, Hampstead, London, NW3 2RR, United Kingdom
- Construction started: c. 1814–15
- Completed: c. 1815–16
- Cost: Restoration: c. £500,000 (£424,000 from Heritage Lottery Fund)

Design and construction
- Designations: Grade I listed

Keats House is a writer's house museum in what was once the home of the Romantic poet John Keats. It is in Keats Grove, Hampstead, in inner north London. Maps before about 1915 show the road with one of its earlier names, John Street; the road has also been known as Albion Grove. The building was originally a pair of semi-detached houses known as "Wentworth Place". John Keats lodged in one of them with his friend Charles Brown from December 1818 to May 1820, and then in the other half of the house with the Brawne family from August to September 1820. These were perhaps Keats's most productive years. According to Brown, "Ode to a Nightingale" was written under a plum tree in the garden.

While living in the house, Keats fell in love with and became engaged to Fanny Brawne, who lived with her family in the adjacent house. Keats became increasingly ill with tuberculosis and was advised to move to a warmer climate. He left London in 1820 and died, unmarried, in Italy the following year.

The house is a Grade I listed building.

== History of the house ==
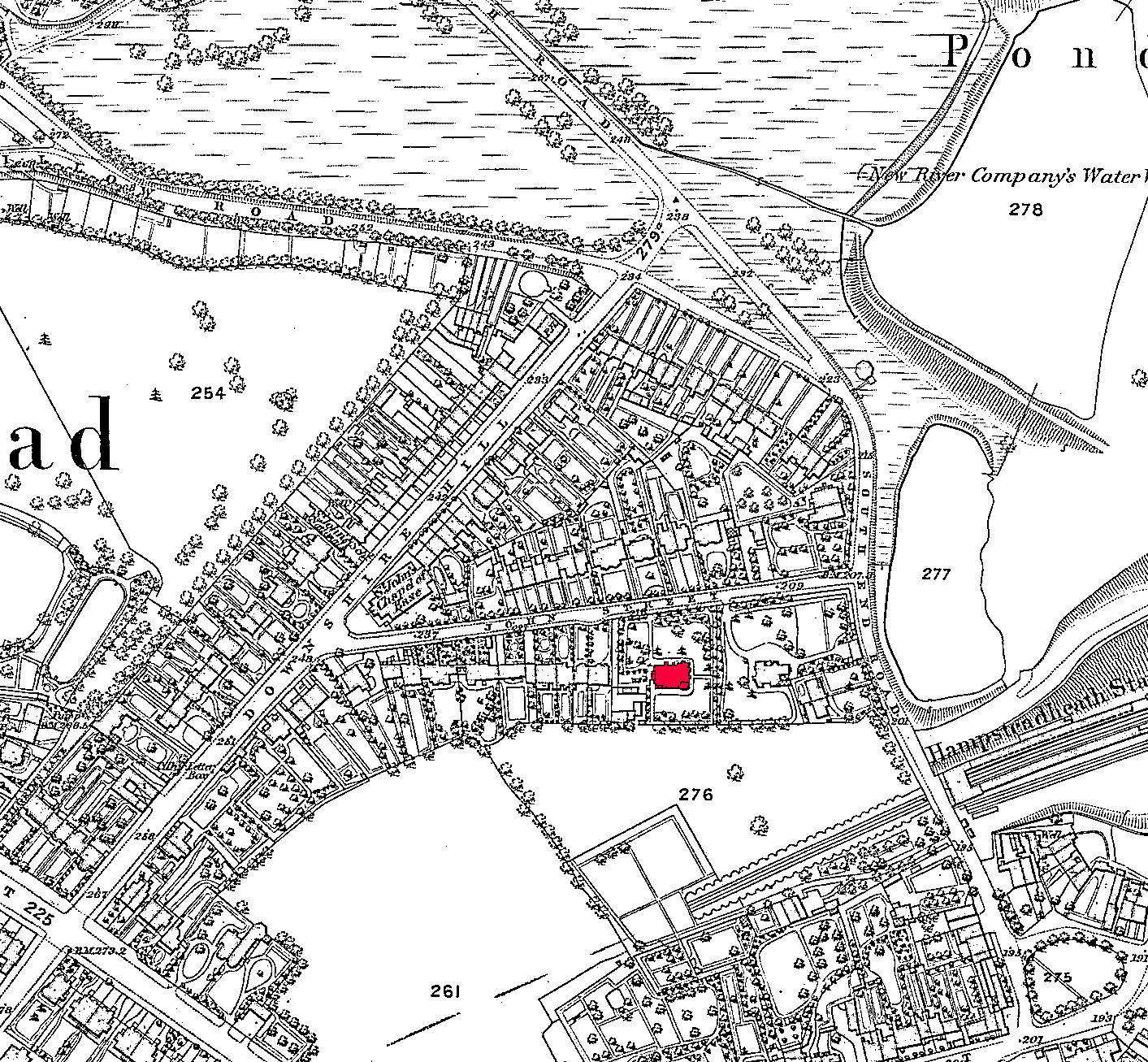
Keats Grove, then known as John Street on part of the 1866 Ordnance Survey map for London with Wentworth Place (Keats House) shown in red; the field marked as 276 is now Heath Hurst Road housing and the pond 277 is filled in.

The house was built during 1814–15 and was probably completed between November 1815 and February 1816. The house was one of the first to be built in the area known as the Lower Heath Quarter.

By October 1816, Charles Wentworth Dilke and his friend Charles Brown had moved in. Other members of the Dilke family occupied two other adjacent houses. John Keats began visiting the house in 1817 after he had been introduced to Dilke by John Hamilton Reynolds, who was part of Leigh Hunt's circle of friends. In December 1818, after Keats's brother Tom died of tuberculosis, Brown invited Keats to "keep house" with him. Keats paid £5 per month (equivalent to £400 in 2025 prices) and half the liquor bill.

Dilke and his family left on 3 April 1819 and let the house, probably furnished, to Mrs Brawne, a widow, and her family, who had briefly occupied Brown's half of the house when Keats and Brown were on their walking tour of Scotland.

Brown transferred his part of Wentworth Place to Dilke's father on 18 June 1822 and left for Italy in the same year.

After Keats's 1821 death, his sister Fanny became friends with Fanny Brawne. Fanny Keats and her husband Valentin Llanos occupied what had been Brown's half of the house from 1828 until 1831. Mrs Brawne died in December 1829 from an accident. By March 1830, the Brawnes had left their part.

There were several notable occupants of the house during the 19th century: the painter and illustrator Henry Courtney Selous (1835–1838); Eliza Chester (1838–1848), a retired actress, once a favourite of George IV, who converted the house into one dwelling and added a dining room and conservatory; the piano manufacturer Charles Cadby (1858–1865); the physiologist Dr William Sharpey (1867–1875); and finally Reverend George Currey, Master of Charterhouse (1876). A Royal Society of Arts plaque was added in 1896 to commemorate Keats.

The house remained in nearly continuous occupation until the 20th century, when it was threatened with demolition. The house was saved by subscription and opened to the public as the Keats Memorial House on 9 May 1925.

In July and August 2009, the museum once again hosted Keats in Hampstead, a performance piece about Keats's life in Hampstead, his poetry, prose and his love for Fanny Brawne.

== Museum ==
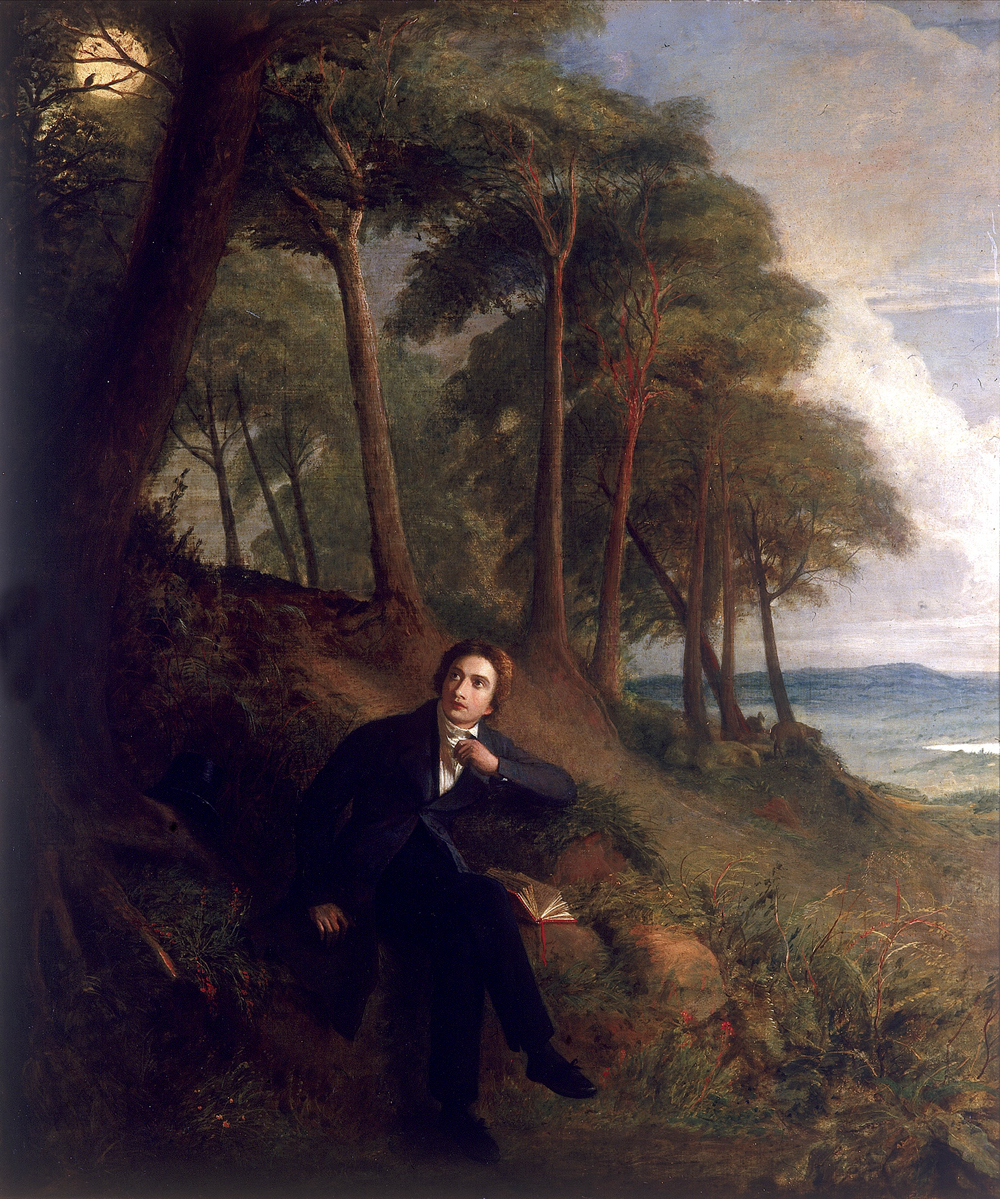
Keats Listening to a Nightingale on Hampstead Heath by Joseph Severn, 1845

The building next door, within the grounds of the house, occupies the space where the kitchen garden and outhouses were; it was also the site of a later coach house. It was opened on 16 July 1931 as the 'Keats Museum and Branch Library', housing both a public library and a room to display artifacts from the Keats House collection. Some of these artifacts were donated by Charles Armitage Brown's descendants in New Plymouth, New Zealand, the town to which Charles Brown emigrated in the last year of his life. The Heath Branch Public Library closed in March 2012. The building, which is part of the Keats House Trust administered by the City of London Corporation, reopened in April 2012 as "Ten Keats Grove". A volunteer-run library currently occupies part of the space in the building.

Artifacts on display in the house include the engagement ring Keats offered to Fanny Brawne and a copy of Keats's death mask. The museum runs regular poetry and literary events, and offers a range of educational facilities. In December 2006 it was announced that the house was to benefit from a restoration programme partly financed by a £424,000 Heritage Lottery Fund grant. Keats House was closed on 1 November 2007 and reopened on Friday, 24 July 2009, some six months after the projected re-opening.

To support the work of the house and to contribute to its upkeep, the Keats Foundation was established as a Trust in November 2010.

== Garden: the Mulberry tree ==
The tree is a Common or Black Mulberry and believed to date from the 17th century. Mulberry trees have been cultivated in England since at least the early 16th century but are not native to Great Britain. As there were other fruit trees in the grounds of Keats House, the mulberry tree may have been part of an orchard. If the tree is as old as it is thought to be, then John Keats would have seen it, although he did not mention it in his writings. Keats did mention a white mulberry tree once in a July 1818 letter to his friend John Hamilton Reynolds.

== Location ==
The house is on the south side of Keats Grove between St John's Church on Downshire Hill and South End Road in Hampstead, London NW3 2RR. (Note: The house is 6km NNW of the customary centre point of London, Charing Cross by Trafalgar Square) The nearest stations are Hampstead Heath railway station on London Overground, and Belsize Park and Hampstead tube stations both on the Northern line, Edgware branch. From central London, red bus route 24 terminates at South End Green, Hampstead, close to the house and marked as 275 at the bottom right of the area map.

== See also ==
- Keats-Shelley Memorial House, Rome, Italy

== Notes and references ==
Notes
