= Mark Bradshaw (composer) =

Australian composer (born 1983)

- Born: 1983 (age 42–43); Sydney, Australia
- Education: UNSW Art & Design; University of Sydney
- Occupation: Composer
- Partner: Ben Whishaw (2012–2022)

Mark Bradshaw (born 1983) is an Australian composer known for his work in film and television.

== Early life ==
Bradshaw was born in Sydney, where he studied experimental music at the College of Fine Arts (COFA) and later attended the University of Sydney.

== Career ==
Bradshaw is best known for his work in several of Jane Campion's movies and TV series, including Bright Star and Top of the Lake. Bradshaw has composed for a variety of ensembles including string quartet, orchestra, and a cappella chorus.

In 2024 he and choreographer Fadi Giha were awarded a British Council Fellowship to compose and create a piece as artists in residence at Bundanon in Australia.

== Personal life ==
As of a 2010 interview, Bradshaw was living in London.

In August 2012, in Sydney, Bradshaw entered into a civil partnership with British actor Ben Whishaw. Whishaw and Bradshaw met around 2009 on the set of Bright Star where Whishaw played the role of English poet John Keats. The relationship remained private until being made public in 2013. They split in 2022.

== Work ==
- The Water Diary (short film), 2006
- Chacun son cinéma ou Ce petit coup au coeur quand la lumière s'éteint et que le film commence, "The Lady Bug" segment, 2007
- The Mirage (short film), 2008
- 8, The Water Diary segment, 2008
- Bright Star, 2009
- A Passionate Woman (TV series), 2 episodes, 2010
- Resistance, 2011
- Top of the Lake (TV series), 7 episodes, 2013
- From the Bottom of the Lake (documentary), 2013
- The Daughter, 2015
- Top of the Lake: China Girl (TV series), 7 episodes, 2017
- O Holy Ghost (short film), 2019
- The Furnace, 2020
- You Won't Be Alone, 2022
- Run Rabbit Run, 2023
- The Clearing (TV series), 8 episodes, 2023

== Awards ==
Date	Category	Work	Result
2010	AFI Award Best Original Music Score	Bright Star	Nominated
2014	AACTA Award Best Original Music Score in Television	Top of the Lake Episode 5 "The Dark Creator"	Nominated
2014	BAFTA Television Craft Award Best Original Music	Top of the Lake Episode 5 "The Dark Creator"	Nominated
2017	FCCA Award Best Music	The Daughter	Nominated
2017	AACTA Award Best Original Music Score in Television	Top of the Lake: China Girl Episode 4 "Birthday"	Nominated
2019	Hainan Island International Film Festival Award Best Short Film	O Holy Ghost	Nominated
2023	APRA/AGSC Award Best Music for a Mini-Series or Telemovie	The Clearing	Won
2023	APRA/AGSC Award Best Television Theme	The Clearing	Nominated
