= 8 (2008 film) =

- Directed by: Abderrahmane Sissako; Gael García Bernal; Mira Nair; Gus Van Sant; Jan Kounen; Gaspar Noé; Jane Campion; Wim Wenders
- Written by: Régine Abadia; Jane Campion; Erin Dignam; Gael García Bernal; Jan Kounen; Suketu Mehta; Rashida Mustafa; Gaspar Noé; Abderrahmane Sissako; Wim Wenders
- Produced by: LDM Productions, Ace & Company
- Edited by: Nadia Ben Rachid, Marc Boucrot, Anny Danche, Allyson C. Johnson, Heidi Kenessey, Gaspar Noé, Alex Rodríguez, Gus Van Sant
- Music by: Mark Bradshaw, Mychael Danna, Jean-Jacques Hertz, Nicolas Jorelle, Nadine Kaiser, François Roy, Rob Simonsen, Mark Tschanz, Walter Werzowa
- Release date: 23 October 2008 (Rome Film Festival)
- Country: France
- Languages: English; French; Amharic; Shipibo; Icelandic

8 is an anthology film consisting of eight short films centred on the eight Millennium Development Goals.

== Topics ==
Eight directors had "carte blanche" to treat one of the eight topics:

- Segment by Abderrahmane Sissako: Tiya's Dream (Eradicate extreme poverty and hunger)
- Segment by Gael García Bernal: The Letter (Achieve universal primary education)
- Segment by Mira Nair: How Can It Be? (Promote gender equality and empower women)
- Segment by Gus Van Sant: Mansion on the Hill (Reduce child mortality rate)
- Segment by Jan Kounen: The Story of Panshin Beka (Improve maternal health)
- Segment by Gaspar Noé: SIDA (Combat HIV/AIDS, malaria, and other diseases)
- Segment by Jane Campion: The Water Diary (Ensure environmental sustainability)
- Segment by Wim Wenders: Person to Person (Develop a global partnership for development)
