= Charles Wentworth Dilke =

English liberal critic and writer (1789–1864)

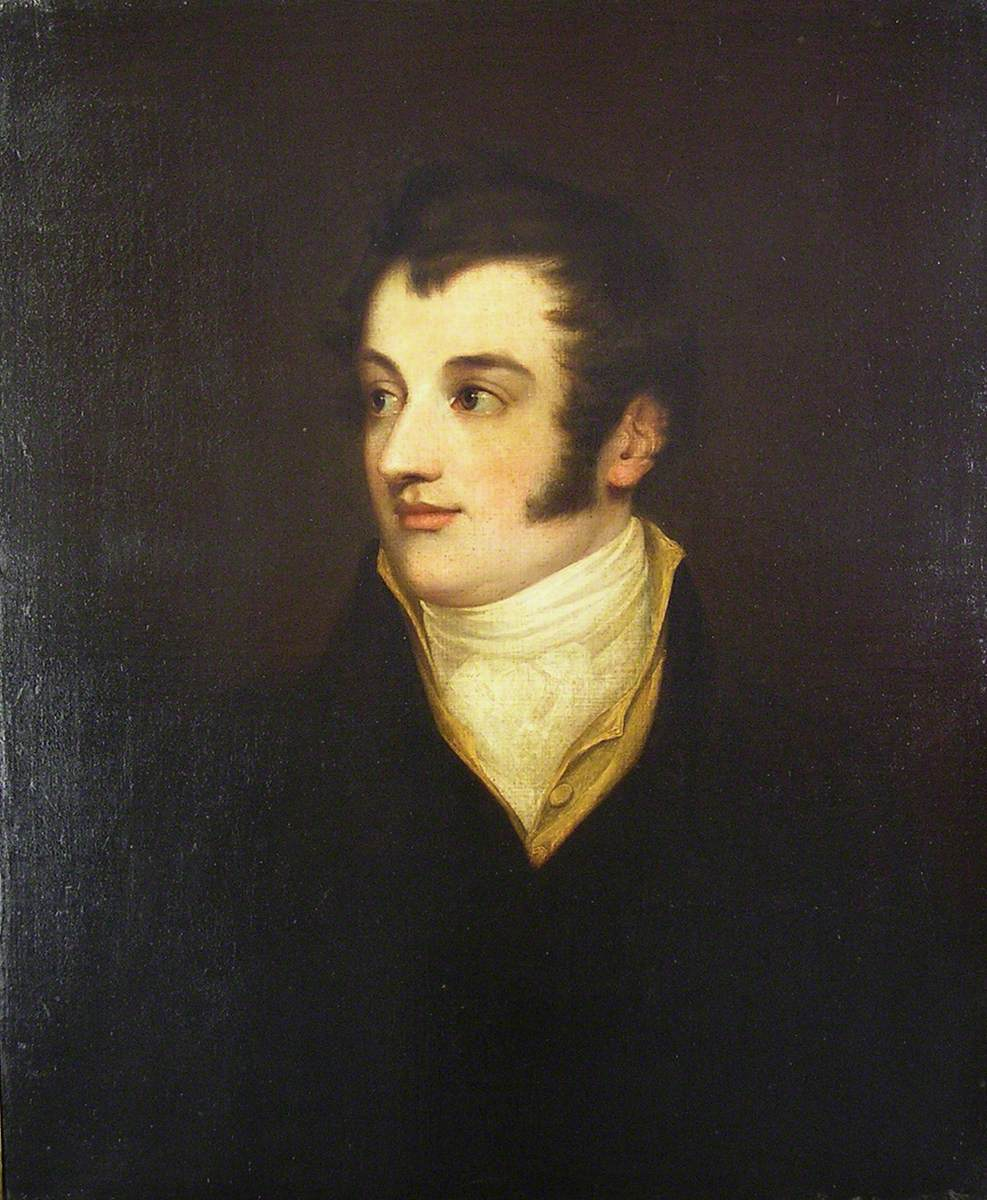
- Born: 1789; Great Britain
- Died: 1864 (aged 74–75); United Kingdom
- Occupations: Civil servant, critic, editor
- Spouse: Maria
- Children: Sir Charles Wentworth Dilke, 1st Baronet
- Writing career
- Language: English

Charles Wentworth Dilke (1789–1864) was an English liberal critic and writer on literature.

== Professional life ==
He served for many years in the Navy Pay-Office, on retiring from which in 1830 he devoted himself to literary pursuits.

== Literary life ==
His liberal political views and literary interests brought him into contact with Leigh Hunt, the editor of The Examiner. He had in 1814–16 made a continuation of Robert Dodsley's Collection of English Plays, and in 1829 he became part proprietor and editor of The Athenaeum magazine, the influence of which he greatly extended. In 1846 he resigned the editorship, and assumed that of The Daily News, but contributed to The Athenaeum papers on Alexander Pope, Edmund Burke, Junius, and others. His grandson, Sir Charles Dilke, published these writings in 1875 under the title, Papers of a Critic. Thanks to his grandson, Dilke is also acknowledged as the author of The Source and Remedy of the National Difficulties, published anonymously in 1821, which exercised an important influence on Marx.

== Wentworth Place ==
Around October 1816, Dilke and his friend Charles Armitage Brown moved into a pair of semi-detached houses later called Wentworth Place in Hampstead, London. The poet John Keats lived with Brown around 1818–20 and was well known to Dilke. In 1822 Brown moved to Italy, selling his share of the property to Dilke. Today Wentworth Place is known as Keats House and is a museum to John Keats.

== Personal life ==
Dilke married Maria Walker, daughter of an official in the East India Company, on 10 October 1806. They had one child, (Charles) Wentworth Dilke. After her death and that of his daughter-in-law in 1853, he devoted increasing time to the upbringing of his grandson and namesake, the future cabinet minister and the 2nd Baronet.

== Bibliography ==
- Garrett, William, Charles Wentworth Dilke. Boston, Twayne, 1982.
- Garrett, William, "Hazlitt's Debt to C. W. Dilke". In: The Keats-Shelley Memorial Bulletin, No. XV, 1964, pp. 37–42.
- Garrett, William, "Two Dilke Letters". In: The Keats-Shelley Memorial Bulletin, No. XXVII, 1976, pp. 1–9.
