= Renton Nicholson =

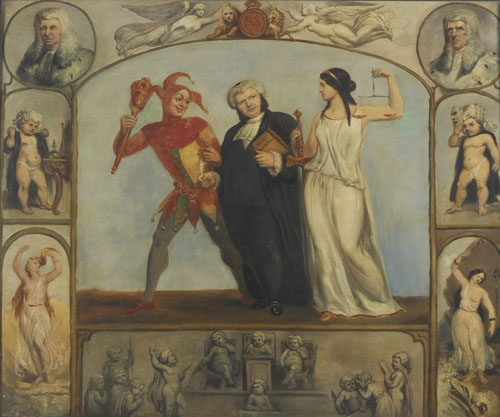
Portrait of Renton Nicholson as a judge, by Archibald Henning

Renton Nicholson (4 April 1809 – 18 May 1861) was an English impresario, businessman, actor, and writer. He is best known for his Judge and Jury Society performances and for his ownership of the newspaper The Town.

After being orphaned at a young age, Nicholson was raised by his sisters, and became an apprentice to a pawnbroker. He then opened a series of unsuccessful businesses that often catered to the lower classes of London, selling cigars, wine and jewels. These ventures were frequently unsuccessful, and he often faced insolvency.

After a stint in the gambling industry, he began serving as the editor of The Town newspaper. It typically covered scandals in London high society. A public feud later erupted between Nicholson and another editor, Barnard Gregory, who published a competing paper. Nicholson also published other periodicals and several literary works, including an autobiography. After leaving the newspaper industry, Nicholson began operating a hotel. There Nicholson began his Judge and Jury Society performances, which lasted for two decades. These acts mocked and satirised members of London society and the preoccupations of the popular press. Though his acts were derided by some for their crudeness, they were attended by many aristocrats, politicians, and other prominent citizens. He hosted the performances at other venues in London and around England, producing the Judge and Jury Society for almost two decades.

Nicholson also staged poses plastiques performances at his establishments. These acts consisted of barely clothed women posing in imitation of well-known works of art. Nicholson catered beverages to a number of racecourses outside of London. He was briefly the owner of Cremorne Gardens. The changes that he made to the pleasure gardens there had a lasting influence on the park's reputation. Though he often encountered financial difficulties, by the time of his death he was known for his frequent acts of generosity to the poor.

== Childhood and early career ==
Nicholson was born in suburban East London and lived on Hackney Road as a child. He was orphaned at a young age, and moved to Islington to be raised by his two sisters, who ran a school there. They raised him as though he were a child of their own. The income from the school allowed them to live a comfortable lifestyle. He was taught by Henry Butter, a well-respected author who had written a much-read treatise on teaching spelling. As a child, Nicholson was fascinated by clowns, and often spent time watching them. Nicholson moved to Shadwell as a young man, and began working as an apprentice to a pawnbroker.

After working in Shadwell for several years, Nicholson moved to Kensington. There he continued working as a pawnbroker until 1830. This occupation exposed him to many lower-class residents of London. In the early 1830s he opened a jewellery store on Regent Street near Leicester Square. He targeted Demimonde customers, whose penchant for conspicuous consumption caused them to frequently patronise jewellers. His business soon failed and he went bankrupt.

Nicholson soon incurred significant debts. As a result, he was sent to debtors' prison several times. He later claimed to know the city's debtors' prisons better than anyone else. He was sometimes homeless after being released.

Nicholson then began spending much of his time gambling in London. He preferred roulette and billiards. He frequently gambled at suburban racecourses in the summer. In 1836 he married, and soon became a cigar merchant. The cigar shop featured a back room where patrons could drink liquor and gamble. He soon abandoned this venture to begin selling wine at a new location in Leicester Square.

== Writing ==
In 1837 Nicholson began working as the editor of The Town, a new weekly paper in London. First published in June 1837, it featured sensationalism and semi-pornographic content. It frequently covered the scandals of members of London's high society, but also advocated universal suffrage. It was often criticised, because it openly discussed subjects that its competitors considered obscene.

The Town was later targeted by Barnard Gregory, the publisher of The Satirist. Gregory was notorious for publishing reports of scandals or blackmailing people. He published several articles attacking The Town. Nicholson retaliated in The Town, with a series of scathing attacks on Gregory and his paper. Gregory responded by pressing libel charges against Nicholson. The case was not brought to trial due to Gregory's imprisonment on unrelated blackmail charges. Though the feud with Gregory increased the circulation of The Town, the paper's sales diminished after the case was dismissed. The paper soon encountered financial difficulties and closed.

In 1838 Nicholson and Last began publishing a more expensive paper known as The Crown. It took a very different focus from The Town, with a more serious tone, and support of Whig politics and the Church of England. Its first issue carried an editorial written by Nicholson under the pseudonym of "Censor", which attacked The Town for its immorality. This caused some to believe that the serious tone of The Crown was not entirely sincere. The Crown ceased publication in 1840.

While serving as the editor of the two papers, Nicholson published two books on boxing. Nicholson began publishing a magazine known as Illustrated London Life in 1843. It released 25 issues before it folded.

== Garrick's Head and Town Hotel ==
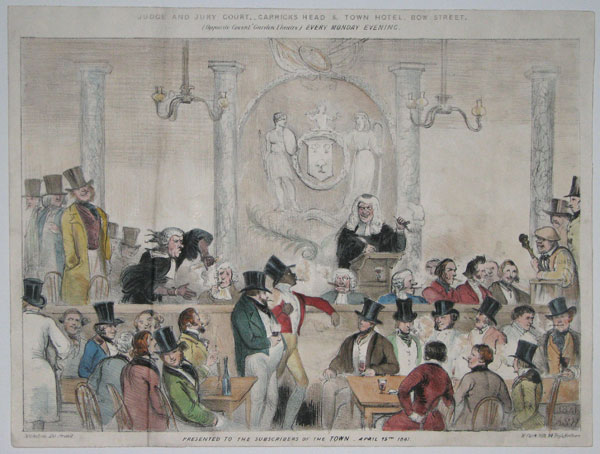
Portrayal of the Judge and Jury Society

In 1842 Nicholson opened the Garrick's Head and Town Hotel on Bow Street in the Covent Garden district of London. The hotel eventually became a popular location frequented by many London residents, including city clerks and gamblers. It also attracted many tourists who visited London for its nightlife.

After purchasing the hotel, Nicholson hired Archibald Henning to paint large portraits on the side of the building, hoping that they would lure curious pedestrians inside. These portraits depicted showed well-known people, such as The Duke of Wellington and Alfred d'Orsay, attending events at the hotel.

The hotel was known for the Judge and Jury Society performances that it hosted. The performances featured Nicholson posing as "The Chief Lord Baron" and holding mock trials. These trials often focused on well-known scandals or controversial issues and were known for humorous repartee, crude jokes, and biting satire. Frequent subjects featured in the trials included divorces and seductions. Clement Scott once described Nicholson's role in the event as a "plebeian Falstaff".

During the performances, Nicholson wore a judge's wig and robe and was referred to as "my lord" by the cast. He sat at a raised desk next to boxes for the prosecutor, witness, and jury. In many instances, men would play the roles of women. The audience sat directly in front of Nicholson's desk. Many of the trials satirised and exaggerated the details of well-known divorce cases, and the actors who portrayed the lawyers often mimicked famous lawyers. The testimonies that were delivered during the performances were generally filled with of innuendos and double entendres. The audiences often included well known citizens and occasionally members of Parliament. The Garrick's Head and Town Hotel charged visitors a one shilling fee for admittance. Once inside, each guest was given a glass of grog and a cigar.

In 1844 the Judge and Jury Society moved to a new location at the Coal Hole Tavern in Strand. At this location, Nicholson began to hold mock parliamentary debates. He also held events in towns outside of London. During the summers, Nicholson served beverages and set up dancing booths at racecourses.

== Cremorne Gardens ==
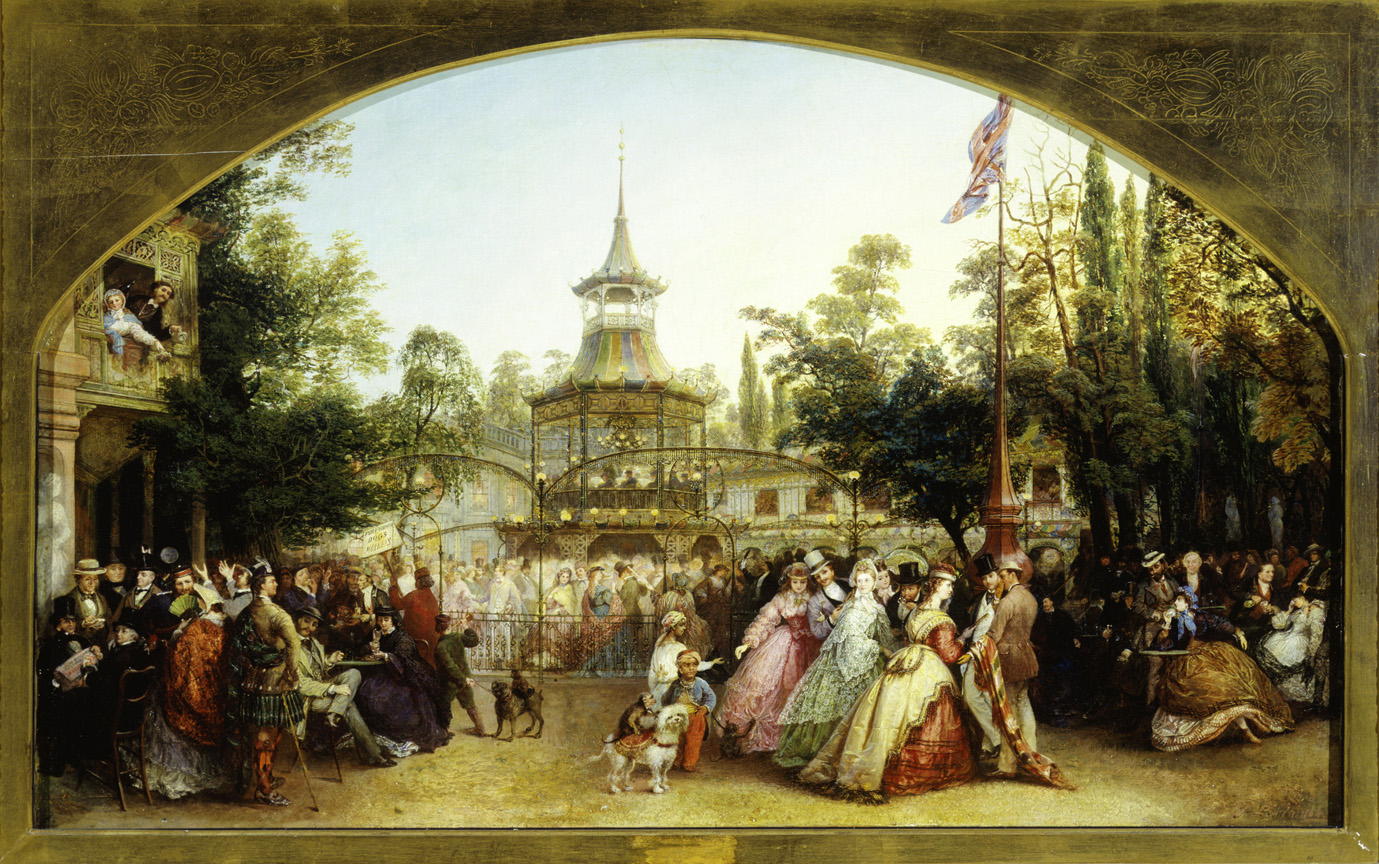
’'The Dancing Platform at Cremorne Gardens'’ by Phoebus Levin

In 1843 Nicholson purchased a 12-acre (0.049 km^{2}) rural sporting arena in Chelsea, London, on the banks of the River Thames, that had opened eleven years earlier. It featured entrances from King's Road and the River Thames. Originally an unremarkable location, Nicholson made drastic changes soon after his purchase, including a large pagoda that was surrounded by a large dancing platform and housed a large orchestra. The facility was surrounded by gardens. Nicholson added refreshment booths and tables so guests could sit and eat at the gardens. While most of the contemporary pleasure gardens were exclusive venues, Nicholson envisioned Cremorne Gardens as a popular amusement park for common people.

Nicholson's financial situation soon deteriorated, and he was forced to sell the gardens. By this time Nicholson was well known for the licentiousness of The Town and the Judge and Jury Society performances. Because of this association, Cremorne Gardens also came to represent sexual immorality. Even after he sold Cremorne Gardens, it retained its reputation, and in London the name "Cremorne" became a general term for sexual excesses.

== Poses plastiques ==
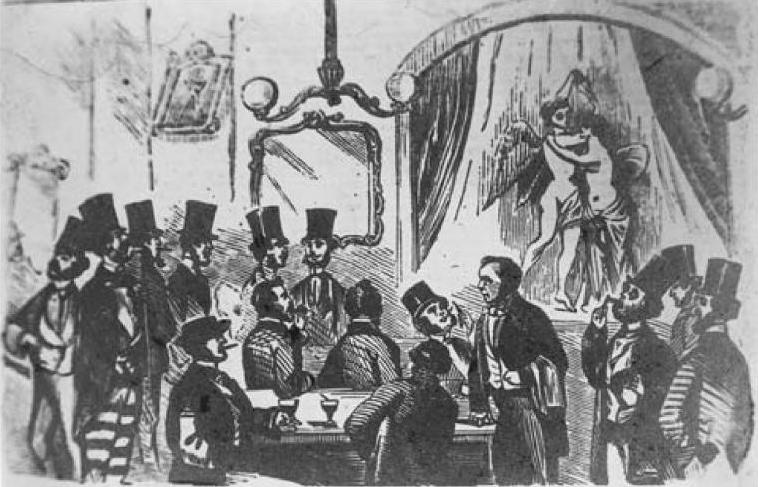
Woodcut of a poses plastiques act at the Coal Hole, 1854

In 1846 Nicholson began showing poses plastiques, a form of tableau vivant, at Garrick's Head and Town Hotel. The acts, which later became a common form of entertainment in London, featured models reenacting a work of art. Nicholson claimed to have been the first person in London to host such an event. The performances were typically scheduled for the early evening, and after performances in the local theatres concluded. At Nicholson's hotel, the models often stood on a revolving stage that overlooked the audience. The stage was illuminated by blue lights, and the room was covered in mirrors. Nicholson stood near the models as they posed and delivered a lecture on art to the audience, most of whom drank and smoked cigars during the performance. He advertised the events as "representing Pictures from the Manchester Art Galleries and scenes from all the Principal Tragedies, Dramas, Operas". The women were purported to be a musical group known as the "Female American Serenaders". Many of the titles of the acts suggested that nudity would be on display, such as "The Sultan's Favourite returning from the bath" or "Cupid and Psyche". One of the few existing depictions of an event shows two women onstage, unclothed except for a loose skirt below the waist of one, and a sash wrapped between the legs and over the shoulder of the other.

Although the poses plastiques were never considered a serious form of art, Nicholson's version has been described as the most low brow form that it took. A writer visiting from France published a critical account of the show, characterising it as a pretentious form of entertainment. It was also criticised by English social reformers, who characterized the acts as a form of prostitution. After Nicholson moved his events to the Coal Hole tavern, the management officially stopped allowing women into the audience in order to fight this perception. However, some women were still able to gain entry to the events.

== Later performances ==
Nicholson continued to hold events at Garrick's Head and Town Hotel until 1851. That year, he became engaged in a dispute with the management, and moved back to the Coal Hole tavern. He soon encountered financial difficulties, which prompted him to begin performing and receiving a regular salary rather than owning and managing a venue. He often gave three performances per night at the Coal Hole tavern.

Nicholson remained at the Coal Hole tavern until 1858, when he moved to the Cider Cellar on Maiden Lane. At the Cider Cellar, he continued staging the Judge and Jury Society and poses plastiques. There he produced one of his most successful events, an 1858 production of a mock trial satirizing the public attention that was given to prostitution. This was a topic that many newspapers were devoting a significant amount of coverage to at that time, and the address given by Nicholson's primary lawyer was later printed and sold well in London. The trial was accompanied by a poses plastiques performance.

== Later life and family ==
In 1860 Nicholson wrote an autobiography titled Rogue's Progress: The Autobiography of 'Lord Chief Baron' Nicholson. The book covered a variety of events in his life, describing debtors' prisons as well as the Judge and Jury Society. It initially garnered positive reviews from some critics, and was republished in 1965 by Houghton Mifflin.

Late in his life he curtailed some of his activities because of ailments such as dropsy and heart disease. Though he often struggled to stay solvent, Nicholson frequently gave charitably to many poor residents of London. Nicholson died in 1861 while staying at his daughters' house in London. He was buried in Brompton Cemetery in South West London.

== Bibliography ==
- Blanchard, Edward; Bates, William (1871), "'Baron' Nicholson", Notes and Queries, 4, vol. 7, William Smith
- G. C. Boase; K. D. Reynolds (2004), "Nicholson, Renton (1809–1861)", Oxford Dictionary of National Biography, Oxford University Press
- Donohue, Joseph (2005), Fantasies of Empire: The Empire Theatre of Varieties and the Licensing Controversy of 1894, University of Iowa Press, ISBN 978-0-87745-960-6
- Paddison, Ronan; Philo, Chris; Routledge, Paul; Sharp, Joanne (2000), Entanglements of Power: Geographies of Domination/Resistance, Routledge, ISBN 978-0-415-18434-2
- Scott, Clement (1899), The Drama of Yesterday & To-Day, vol. 1, Macmillan
- Smith, Alison (1997), The Victorian nude: sexuality, morality, and art, Manchester University Press, ISBN 978-0-7190-4403-8
- Vizetelly, Henry (1893), Glances back through seventy years: autobiographical and other reminiscences, vol. 1, Kegan Paul, Trench, Trubner & Co., ISBN 978-0-415-18434-2
