= The Town (newspaper) =

- Type: Tabloid
- Founder(s): Joseph Last
- Editor: Renton Nicholson
- Founded: 1837
- Political alignment: Non-political
- Ceased publication: 1840
- Headquarters: London

The Town was a British newspaper that was published between 1837 and 1840. It generally covered the scandals and nightlife of London. Many of the topics written about in the paper were considered extremely vulgar at the time and it was often criticized for discussing these topics. Renton Nicholson, the editor and part owner of the paper, became embroiled in several legal disputes due to the articles that he published.

== Content ==
The Town was founded by the printer Joseph Last in order to cover the "flash life" culture of London. Last initially hired his friend Renton Nicholson to serve as editor. Nicholson later became a part owner of the paper. The first issue of The Town was published in June 1837. The paper consisted of four pages in a large format featuring illustrations. Frequent topics discussed included scandals, theatre and taverns. They often published drawings of waitresses and courtesans. In the early days of its publication, The Town underwent rapid growth.

The Town influenced a number of other publications. Among the notable papers that it influenced include Peter Spy and Paul Pry. Some American papers directly copied material that was first published in The Town without crediting them.

== Contributors ==
Archibald Henning, who later worked for Punch, contributed many drawings of London residents to The Town. He often depicted controversial figures in London society on the first page of the paper. Ebenezer Landells was another early contributor who later moved to Punch.

Although he was initially the editor of the paper, Nicholson later purchased an ownership stake in the paper. He wrote most of the early features in the paper himself, but eventually hired new writers to author most of the articles. He hired Edward Litt Laman Blanchard to write for The Town when Blanchard was only seventeen years old. Blanchard wrote for the paper from 1837 to 1839, contributing what he later described as "social essays and dramatic notices". He later reflected fondly on his days with the paper.

== Criticism ==
Many commentators attacked The Town for its vulgarity. Edmund Yates characterized it as "atrociously blackguard". Its articles covered subjects that most other publications refused to discuss. Some claimed that the paper was known for "invading private life and holding up respectable men to ridicule". Some commentators praised The Town for exposing swindlers.

The vice society once indicted Nicholson for "corrupting public morals" because of articles that he published. He claimed that this charge was retaliation against him for bringing the transgressions of powerful people to light.

== Controversy ==
Barnard Gregory, who published The Satirist, engaged in a high-profile campaign against The Town. Gregory first attacked Joseph Last in The Satirist. After reading of the attack, Nicholson retaliated against Gregory in several articles that were published in The Town. Gregory then pressed charges against Nicholson because of the content of the articles. The case never went to trial because Gregory was soon imprisoned due to an unrelated case.

Though the controversy initially fueled the paper's sales, the circulation decreased sharply after the controversy subsided. The paper never recovered and folded in 1840.

== See also ==
- Town and Country Magazine

== Bibliography ==
- Blanchard, Edward; Clarry; Bates, William (1871), "'Baron' Nicholson", Notes and Queries, 4, vol. 7, London: William Smith, p. 584
- Boase, George Clement (1885–1900). "Gregory, Barnard" . Dictionary of National Biography. London: Smith, Elder & Co.
- Boase, George Clement (1893), "The Lord Chief Baron Nicholson", in White, William (ed.), Notes and Queries, 8, vol. 3, London: John C. Francis, p. 529
- Cohen, Patricia; Gilfoyle, Timothy; Horowitz, Helen (2008), The flash press: sporting male weeklies in 1840s New York, Chicago: University of Chicago Press, p. 290, ISBN 978-0-226-11234-3
- Scott, Clement (1899), The Drama of Yesterday & To-Day, vol. 1, London: MacMillan, p. 607
- Vizetelly, Henry (1893), Glances back through seventy years: autobiographical and other reminiscences, vol. 1, London: Kegan Paul, Trench, Trubner & Co., p. 320, ISBN 978-0-415-18434-2
- Yates, Edmund (1884), Fifty years of London life: Memoirs of a man of the world, New York: Harper & Brothers, p. 64
