= Bandstand =

Structure designed to accommodate bands during concerts

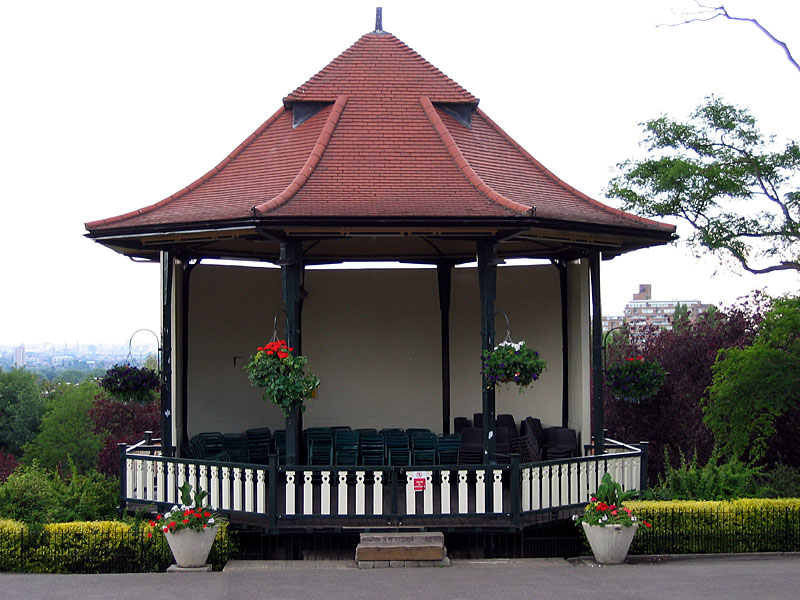
A bandstand built in 1912 stands in the grounds of the Horniman Museum in London

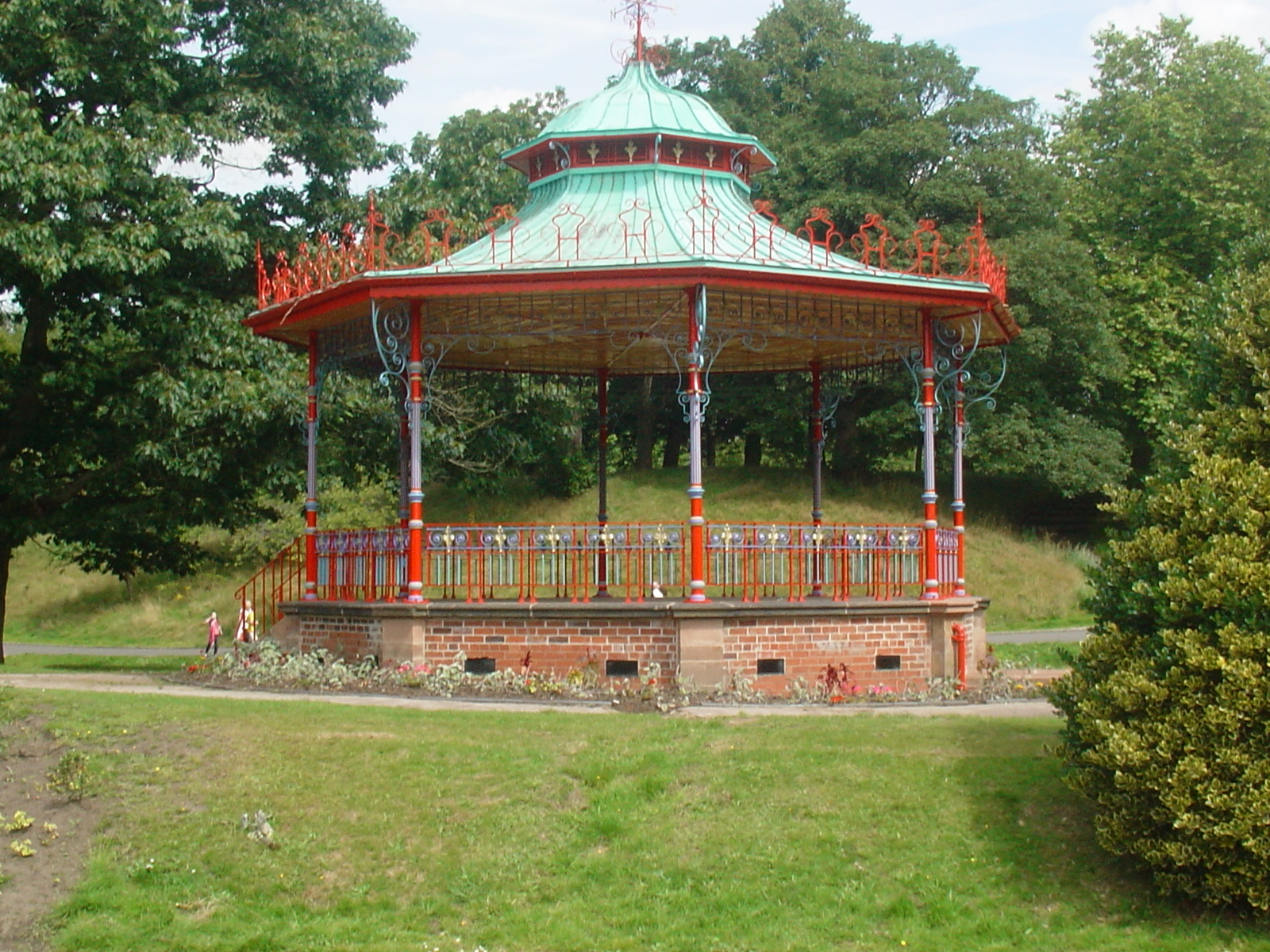
Bandstand at Sefton Park, Liverpool, England

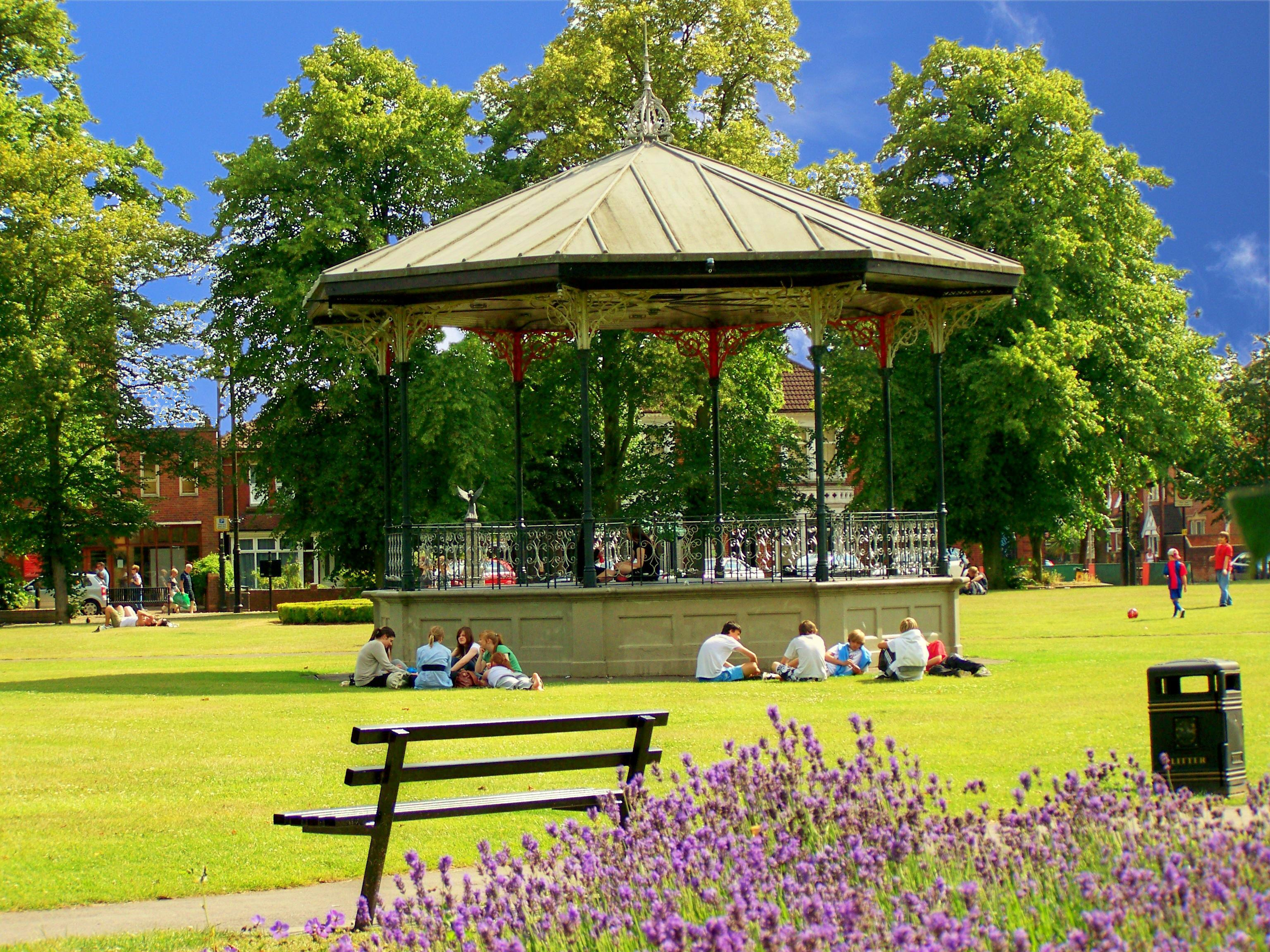
Victorian bandstand in Eastleigh, UK

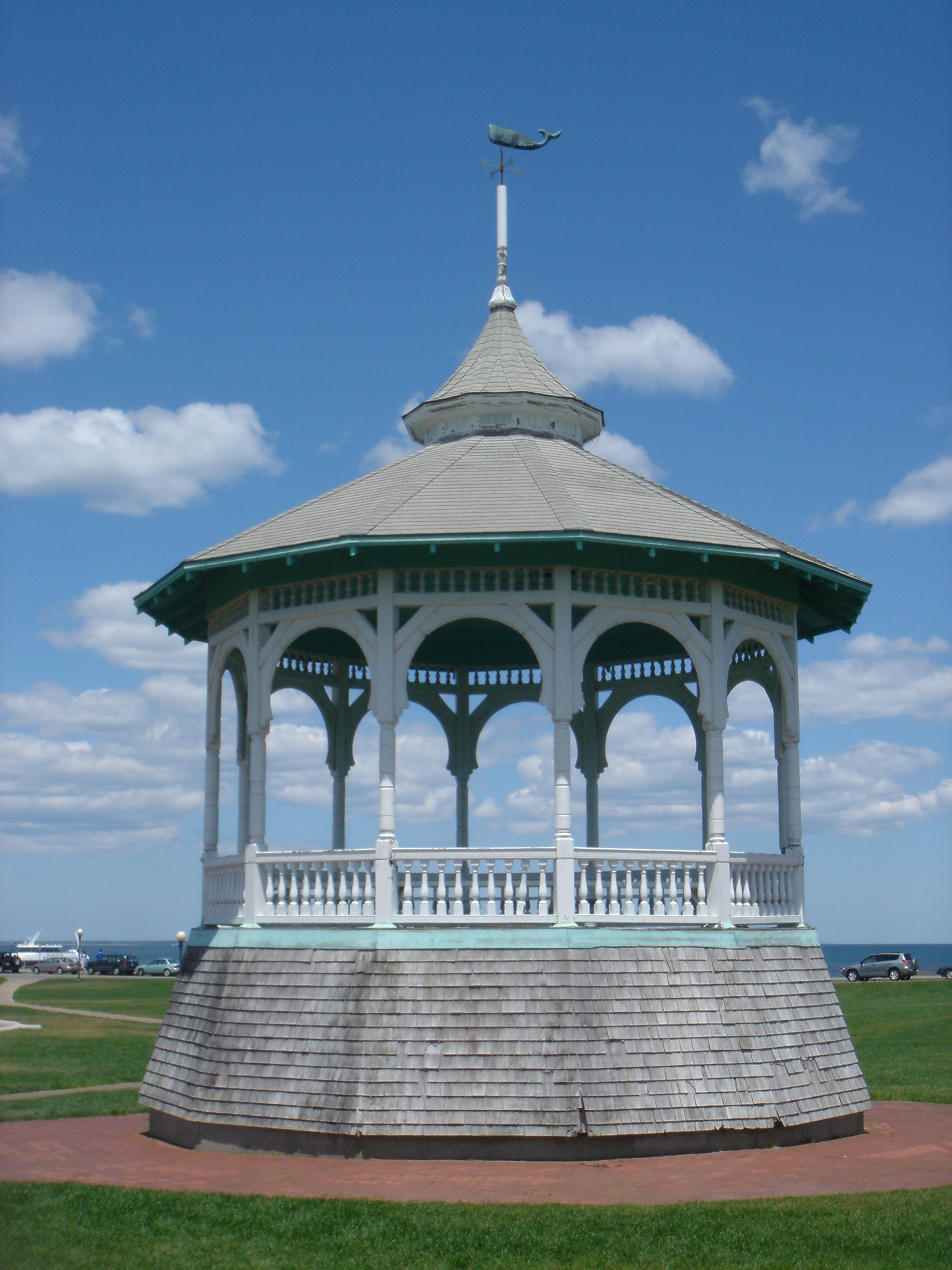
Ocean Park bandstand, Oak Bluffs, Martha's Vineyard, Massachusetts

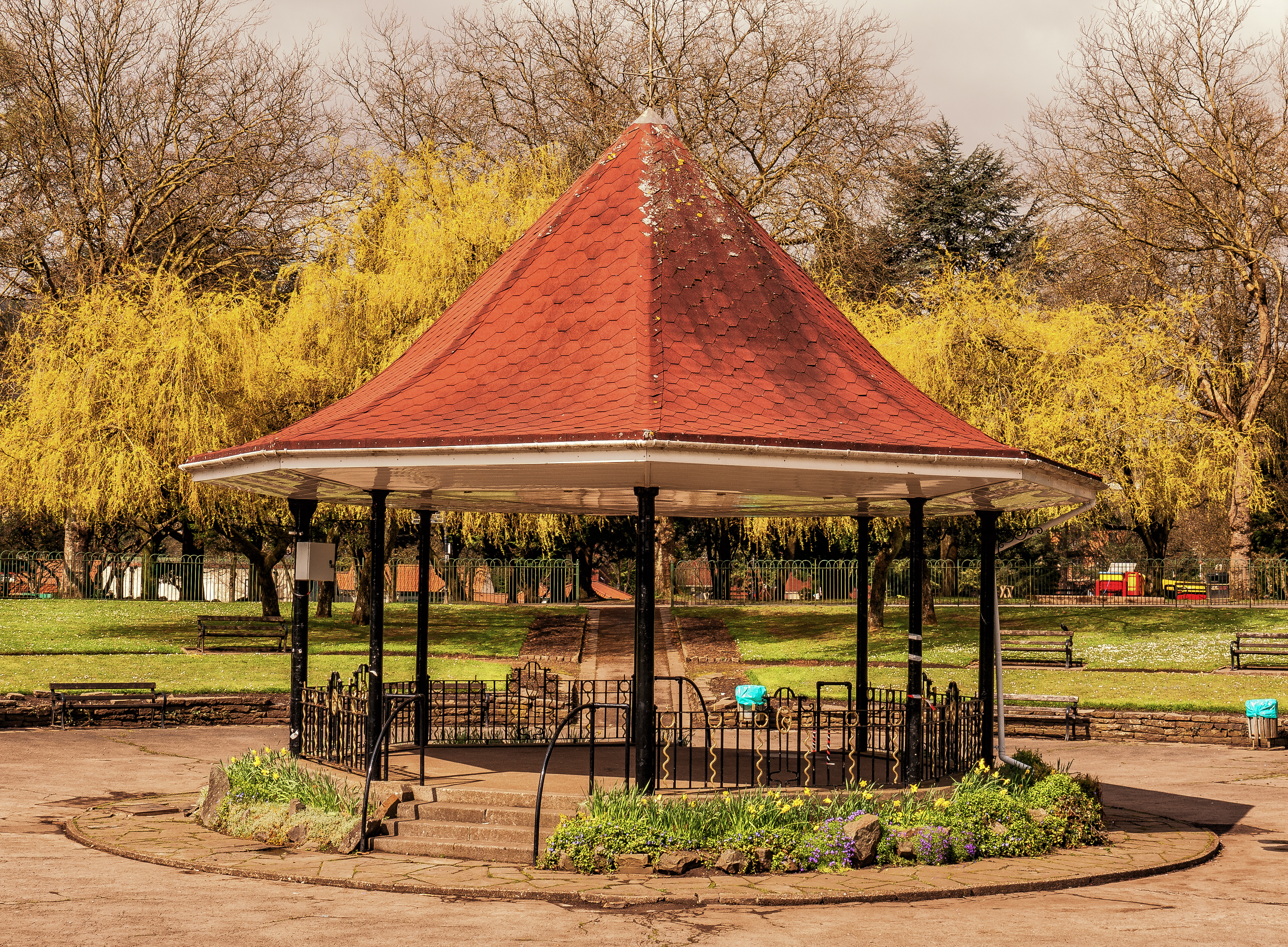
The bandstand in Ynysangharad Park, Pontypridd, south Wales.

A bandstand (sometimes music kiosk) is a circular, semicircular or polygonal structure set in a park, garden, pier, or indoor space, designed to accommodate musical bands performing concerts. A simple construction, it both creates an ornamental focal point and also serves acoustic requirements while providing shelter for the changeable weather, if outdoors. In form, bandstands resemble ornamental European garden gazebos modeled on outdoor open-sided pavilions found in Asian countries from early times.

== Origins ==
During the 18th and 19th centuries this type of performance building was found in the fashionable pleasure gardens of London and Paris where musicians played for guests dining and dancing. They were later built in public spaces in many countries as practical amenities for outdoor entertainment.

Many bandstands in the United Kingdom originated in the Victorian era as the British brass band movement gained popularity. Smaller bandstands are often not much more than gazebos. Much larger bandstands such as that at the Hollywood Bowl may be called bandshells and usually take a shape similar to a quarter sphere. Though many bandstands fell into disuse and disrepair in the post-World War II period, the cultural project the Bandstand Marathon has seen bandstands across the UK utilized for free live concerts since 2008.

== History in Britain ==
The parks where most bandstands are found were created in response to the Industrial Revolution, when local authorities realized worsening conditions in urban areas meant there was an increasing need for green, open spaces where the general public could relax. The first bandstands in Britain were built in the Royal Horticultural Society Gardens, South Kensington in 1861. Bandstands quickly became hugely popular and were considered a necessity in parks by the end of the 19th century.

To assist the war effort during World War II, iron fittings were removed from many bandstands to be melted down and transformed into weapons and artillery. Many bandstands fell into disrepair and were boarded up in the late 1940s and 1950s. Other attractions – such as the cinema and television – were becoming increasing popular and traditional recreational parks lost much of their appeal.

Between 1979 and 2001, more than half of the 438 bandstands in historic parks across the country were demolished, vandalized or in a chronic state of disuse. In the late 1990s the National Lottery and Heritage Lottery Fund invested a substantial sum in the restoration and rebuilding of bandstands across the country. As a result of this funding, over eighty bandstands were either fully restored or replaced. Between 1996 and 2010 there was over £500 million worth of investments in parks - a significant chunk of this money was spent on the restoration and building of bandstands.

== History in United States ==
Gazebo bandstands appeared in the United States after the Civil War (1861–65) to accommodate the brass and percussion "cornet" bands found in towns of every size. Styles ranged from exotic ″Moorish″ designs to ordinary wood pavilions with mill work trim. They were found in parks, court house squares and fairgrounds. Following the Worlds Columbian Exposition (world's fair) of 1893 in Chicago, amusement parks based on the famous Midway became popular. These were often established by trolley companies to provide a trolley destination on weekends. Bandstands and dance pavilions were an essential feature of these parks. Most are no longer in existence.

After 1900, rectangular pavilions enclosing a stage and acoustical shell providing directional sound appeared in many parks. Styles of acoustical shells took several forms during the 20th century. In 1913 Frank Lloyd Wright designed a freestanding bandshell with edge–supported cantilever roof and no side posts for his Midway Gardens (demolished 1929) in Chicago. Variations on this design were built later in the century.

The 1928 Hollywood Bowl shell in California designed by Wright's son Lloyd Wright was a prototype for the streamlined concrete bandshell of the 1930s. Many of these shells with their distinctive concentric arches survive as landmarks in parks across the US.

Preservation of historic bandstands is by local initiative. Some are on the National Register of Historic Places, usually as part of a historic district. Continuous use as performing venues is a good incentive to keep them maintained. When this is not possible they must be maintained solely as historic landmarks. In many places a succession of bandstands, sometimes as many as three or four, were built on the same site. Because of this practice it is important to preserve postcards and photographs of earlier structures as a historical record.

== Notable bandstands ==
=== England ===
In 1993, the Deal Memorial Bandstand was opened as memorial to the eleven bandsmen killed by 1989 Deal barracks bombing. The bandstand was erected by public subscription and is maintained by volunteers.

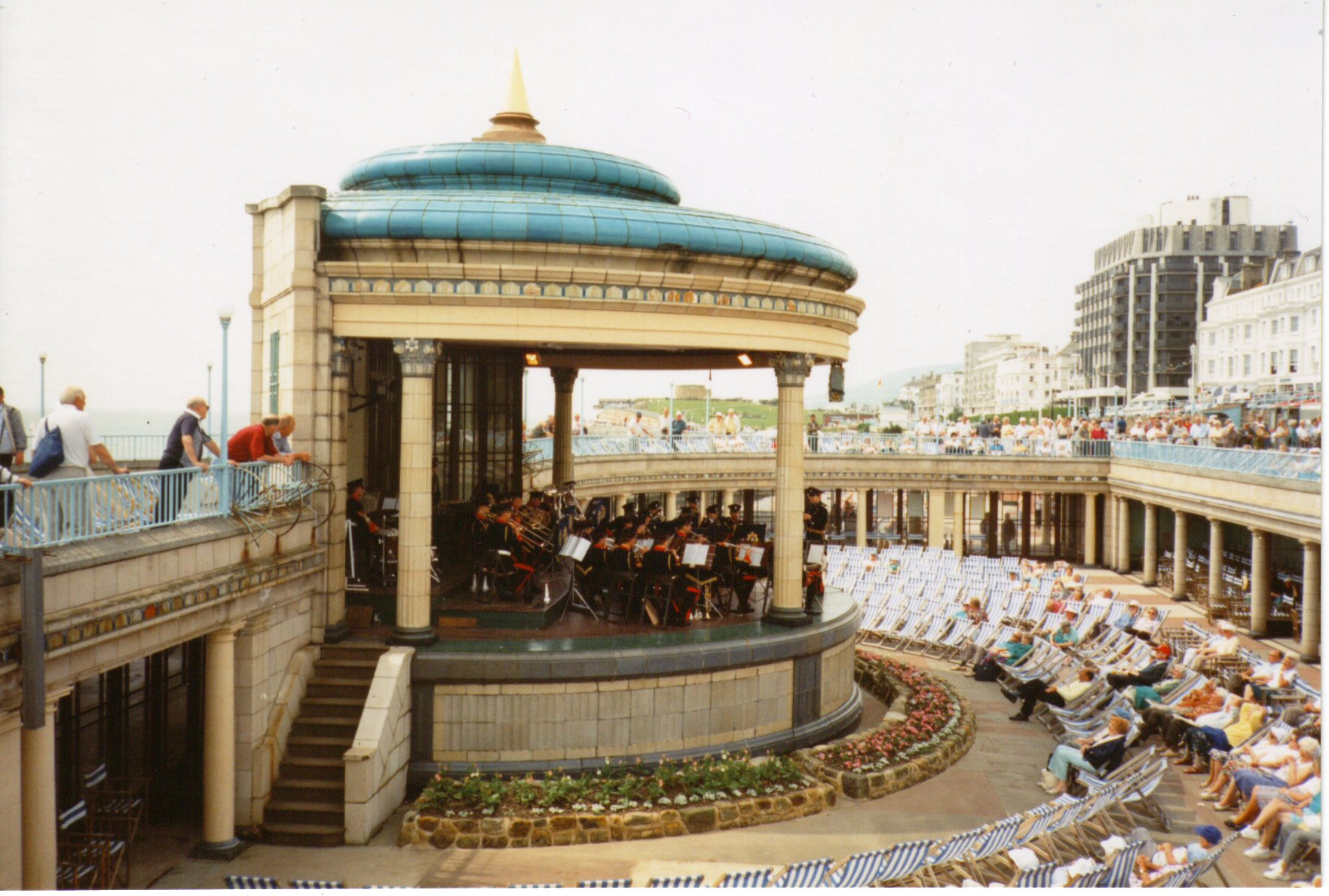
Eastbourne bandstand opened in 1935

A good example of a semi-circular bandstand is the Eastbourne Bandstand, built in 1935 to replace a circular bandstand that stood on cast iron stilts. Herne Bay, Kent contains a totally enclosed bandstand with a stage and cafe area, topped with copper-clad domes.

There is a very old bandstand at Horsham's Carfax, built in 1892 by Walter Macfarlane & C at the Saracen Foundry in Glasgow, and another one in its adjacent park. It was moved slightly from its original location, to better accommodate pedestrians and then refurbished in 1978 with funds raised by the Horsham Society and with council funding. In 1992, the original design was rediscovered in museum archives and it was then restored to its original colour scheme.

==== Cornwall ====
- Gyllyngdune Gardens in Falmouth (1907)
- Killacourt Gardens in Newquay
- Morrab Gardens in Penzance
- Truro Road Park in St Austell
- Victoria Gardens in Truro (1897)

=== Scotland ===
Scotland's many ironwork foundries and manufacturers built bandstands that were subsequently erected at locations throughout the United Kingdom.

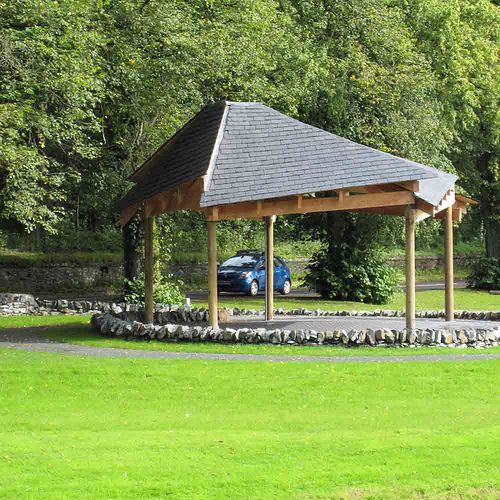
Langholm Town Bandstand built in 2008 in the Scottish Borders

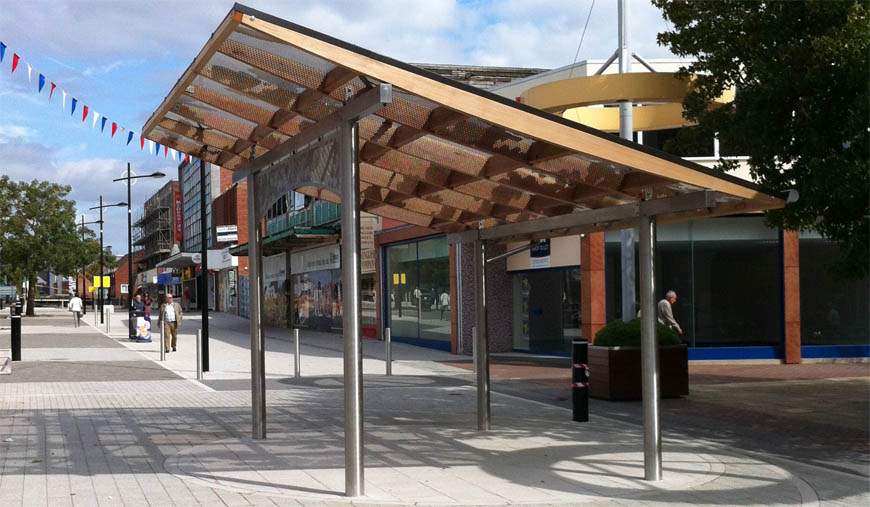
A modern Bandstand located in Waterlooville, Hampshire, England. Built in September 2012

Some of the most notable bandstands in Scotland are located at:

- Alexander Hamilton Memorial Park in Stonehouse
- Bellfield Park in Inverness
- Bothwell Road Public Park in Hamilton
- Brechin Park in Brechin
- Bridgeton Cross, Glasgow
- Burngreen Peace Park in Kilsyth
- Collison Park in Dalbeattie
- Clyde Retail Park in Clydebank
- Dock Park in Dumfries
- Duthie Park in Aberdeen
- George Allan Park in Strathaven
- Glebe Park, Falkirk in Falkirk
- Haugh Park in Cupar
- Houston Square in Johnstone
- High Street, Falkirk in Falkirk
- Kelvingrove Park in Glasgow
- Langholm Town Bandstand
- Lewisvale Park in Musselburgh
- Macrosty Park in Crieff
- Magdalene Park in Dundee
- Overtoun Park in Rutherglen
- Princes Street Gardens in Edinburgh
- St Margaret's Drive Park in Dunfermline
- Stair Park in Stranraer
- The Links in Nairn
- The Scores in St Andrews, Fife

=== Wales ===
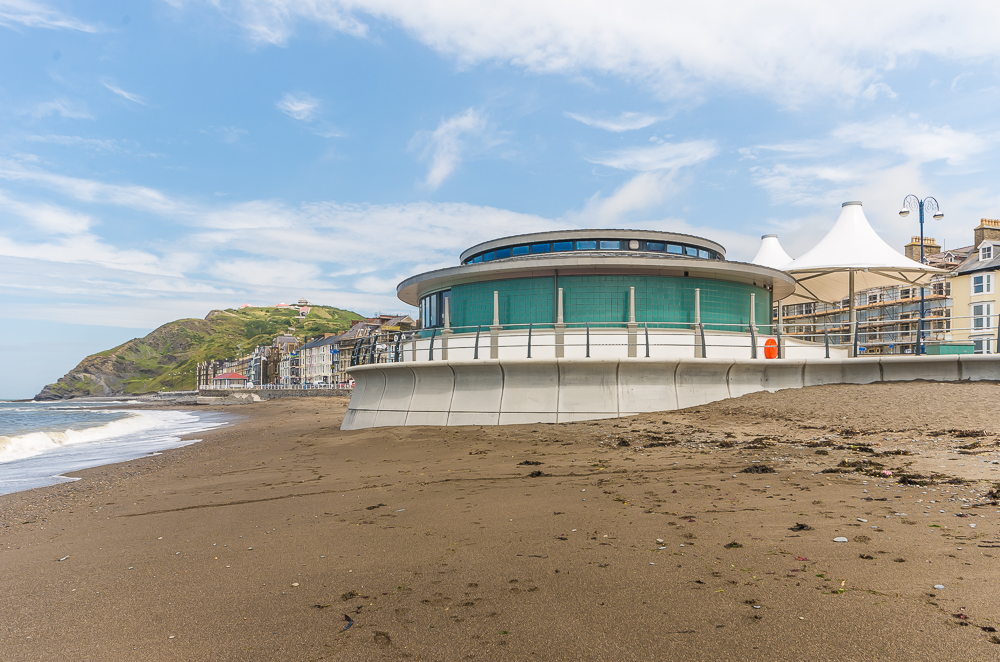
Aberystwyth Bandstand, reopened in 2016

- Aberdare Park, Aberdare
- Ammanford Park, Ammanford
- Bailey Park, Abergavenny
- Bedwellty Park, Tredegar
- Belle Vue Park, Newport
- Bellevue Park, Wrexham
- Carmarthen Park, Carmarthen
- Castle Court, Caerphilly
- Cyfarthfa Castle, Merthyr Tydfil
- Gelli Park, Gelli
- Grange Gardens, Cardiff
- Penlan Park, Llandeilo
- People's Park, Llanelli
- Pontypool Park, Pontypool
- Promenade, Aberystwyth
- Promenade, Llandudno
- Riverside Gardens, Chepstow
- Victoria Park, Cadoxton
- Ynysangharad Park, Pontypridd

=== United States ===
- Abraham Lash bandstand in Bellville, Ohio (1879)
- Alamo Plaza in San Antonio, Texas (1978)
- Audubon Park, Isidore and Rebecca Newman Bandstand in New Orleans, Louisiana (1921)
- Cambier Park in Naples, Florida (1987)
- Central Park, Transfer House with rooftop bandstand in Decatur, Illinois (1895)
- City Park (Square), Barnhouse Memorial Bandstand in Oskaloosa, Iowa (1912)
- City Park in Platteville, Wisconsin (1992)
- City Park, Popp's Bandstand in New Orleans, Louisiana (1917)
- Civic Square, Minnie M. Doane Gazebo in Carmel, Indiana (1987)
- Cold Spring, NY at Water Front
- Community Park in Jacksonville, Illinois (2:1879,1883)
- Court House Square in Albion, Illinois
- Forest Park, Nathan Frank Bandstand in St. Louis, Missouri (1925)
- Fountain Square in Highland, Illinois (1980)
- Garfield Park in Chicago, Illinois (1896)
- Grant Park in Galena, Illinois (1900)
- Hopedale Town Park Hopedale, Massachusetts (1903) scheme.
- Horace White Park in Beloit, Wisconsin (1987)
- Iolani Palace, Royal Bandstand in Honolulu, Hawaii (1883)
- Jones Park in Canton, Illinois (1991)
- Kate Gould Park in Chatham, Massachusetts
- Lane Place Gazebo in Crawfordsville, Indiana (1995)
- Mill Creek Park, Fellows Riverside Gardens in Youngstown, Ohio (1983)
- Millenium Park, Pritzker Pavilion in Chicago, Illinois (2003)
- Milo, Iowa - History of Milo, IA bandstand http://www.cityofmilo.com/history/
- Ocean Park in Oak Bluffs, Massachusetts (1880s) See accompanying photo
- Old Town Plaza in Albuquerque, New Mexico (1936)
- Olvera Street Plaza in Los Angeles, California
- Onondaga Park in Syracuse, New York
- Parkman Bandstand in Boston, Massachusetts (1912)
- Sam Houston Park in Houston, Texas (1905)
- Square in Spillville, Iowa (1919)
- Tappan Square, Clark Bandstand in Oberlin, Ohio (1987)
- Tower Grove Park, Henry Shaw Bandstand in St. Louis, Missouri (1872)
- Town Square in Ellington, New York (1824)
- Townsend Common in Townsend, Massachusetts
- US Naval Academy, Chapel Walk in Annapolis, Maryland
- US Naval Academy, Parade Ground in Annapolis, Maryland
- US Veterans Affairs Illiana Health Care System campus in Danville, Illinois (1901)
- Village Green in Weston, Vermont
- Village Park in Bishop Hill, Illinois (1976)
- Wick's Park in Saugatuck, Michigan (1976)
- Washington Park in Michigan City, Indiana (1911)
- Washington Park in Springfield, Illinois
- West Side Park, Terry Bilbrey Bandstand in Champaign, Illinois (2008)
- Williams Park in St. Petersburg, Florida (1953)

=== Worldwide ===
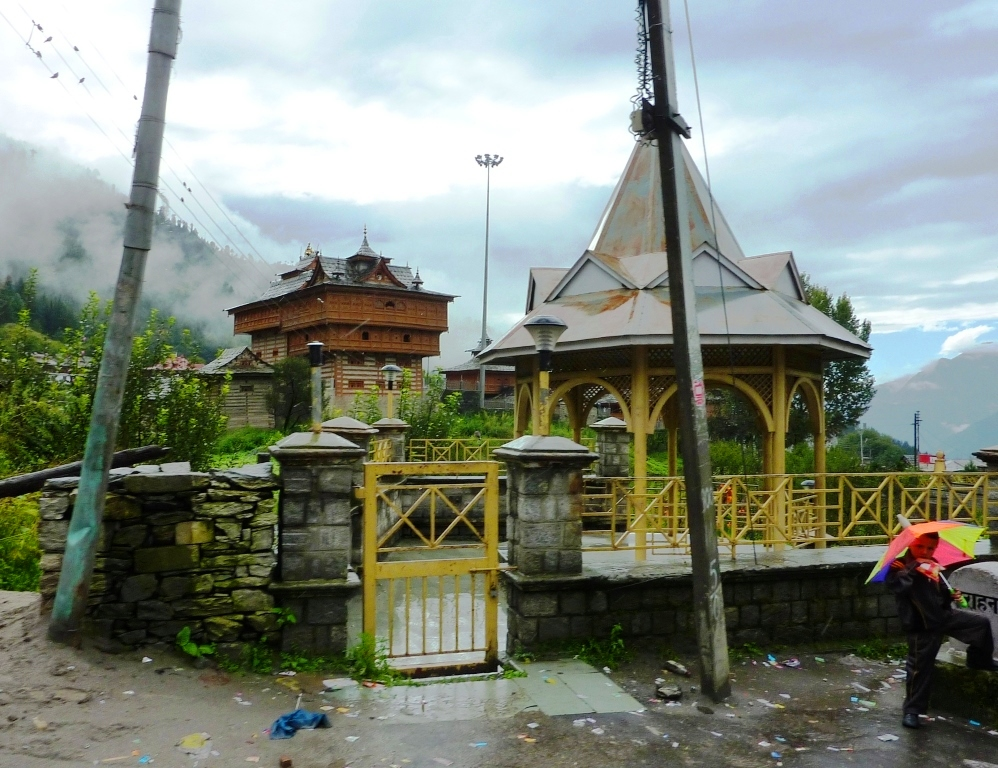
Bandstand at Royal Palace, Sarahan, India

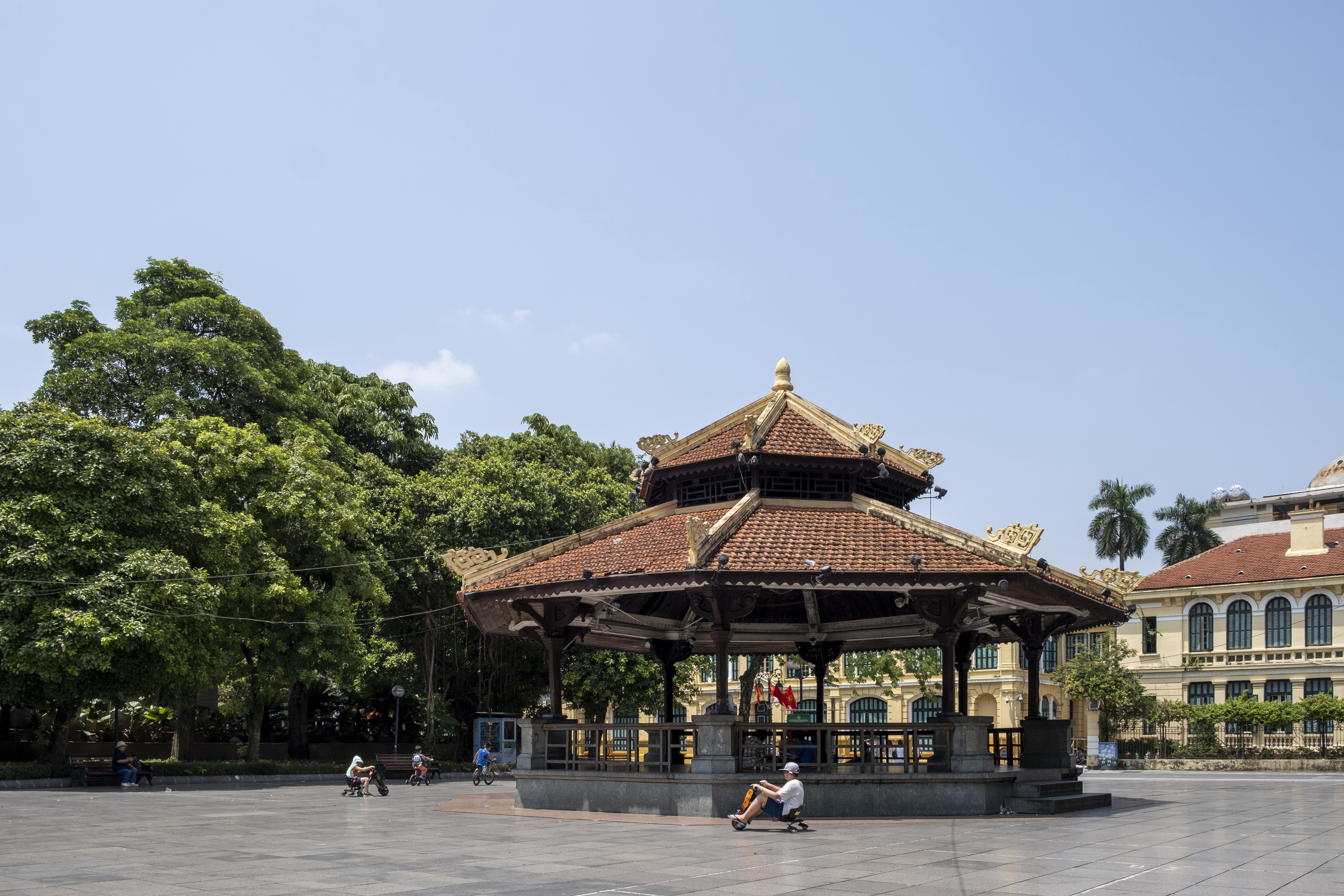
Bandstand in Hanoi, Vietnam

- Canada: Central Park in Banff, Alberta (1986)
- Canada: Dufferin Terrace, Chateau Frontenac in Quebec, Quebec
- Canada: Public Gardens in Halifax, Nova Scotia (1887)
- Denmark: Tivoli Gardens, Harmonie Pavilion in Copenhagen
- Denmark: Tivoli Gardens, Promenade Pavilion in Copenhagen
- Indonesia: Kraton (Sultan's Palace) in Yogyakarta
- Italy: Cassarmonica in Castellammare di Stabia (1911)
- Italy: Cassarmonica in Naples
- Italy: Cassarmonica in Catania
- Italy: Cassarmonica in Augusta
- Italy: Cassarmonica in Caltagirone
- Mexico: Jardín Libertad in Colima City (1891)
- Mexico: Plaza de Armas in Guadalajara (1907)
- Monaco: Terrasse du Casino in Monte Carlo (1890)
- New Zealand: Cornwall Park and Albert Park in Auckland, Leamington Domain in Cambridge
- Norway: Musikpavilonen by the National Theater in Oslo
- Serbia: Bandstand near Crnica river in Paraćin
- Singapore: Bandstand in Singapore Botanic Gardens
- Spain: Palco de la música, Cantón de Molíns in Ferrol (1894)
- Spain: Plaça de la Palmera in Barcelona (1984)

== In arts, entertainment, and literature ==
The function of the bandstand inspired the names of:

- the American television show American Bandstand (1952–1989) and
- the Australian television show Bandstand (Australia) (1958–72).
- the Broadway musical Bandstand

Movies and cinema:

- In The Beatles animated film The Yellow Submarine (1968) John, Paul, George and Ringo find a Grand Bandstand with enough stored instruments to recreate Sgt. Pepper's Lonely Hearts Club Band and musically liberate Pepperland from the Blue Meanies. Ringo frees the Pepperland musicians trapped on their bandstand inside a giant bubble.

Musical compositions:

- "The Bandstand, Hyde Park (La Kiosque de Hyde Park)" movement 3 of "Frescoes (Fresques) Suite" by Haydn Wood. London: Boosey & Hawkes QMB Edition no. 78 (military band)
- "The Silver Gazebo" (1996) march by James Barnes. San Antonio, Texas: Southern Music Company (Kelly Bandstand in South Park, Lawrence, Kansas)

Works of art and design:

- Bandstand in Vauxhall Gardens, London, color engraving by Muller (1751)
- A General Prospect of Vaux Hall Gardens, color engraving drawn by Samuel Wale and engraved by I.S. Muller (c.1751)
- The Dancing Pavilion at Cremorne Gardens London, oil painting by Phoebus Levin (1864)
- Le Dimanche, musique à la campagne, painting by Raoul Dufy (1942–43)
- Chatham, Massachusetts band concert in Kate Gould Park, painting by Grace Chapin
- ″The Coronation Pavilion also known as the Royal Bandstand″ Honolulu, counted cross stitch design by Frances L. Johnson Designs, Honolulu, Hawaii
- The Great Bandstand Design Competition: Exhibition, 2 May–5 July 1987, Allen Memorial Art Museum, Oberlin, Ohio (architectural drawings)

== See also ==
- Belvedere
- Dance pavilion
- Deal barracks bombing
- Gazebo
- Hyde Park and Regent's Park bombings
- Kiosk
- Pavilion
- Shell (theater)

== General and cited sources ==
- Martin, Linda and Kerry Segrove (1983). City Parks of Canada. Oakville, Ontario: Mosaic Press.
- Mussat, Marie–Claire (1992). La Belle Epoque des Kiosques à Musique. Paris: Du May. ISBN 2-906450-63-4. (International)
- Starr, S. Frederick, ed. (1987). The Oberlin Book of Bandstands. Washington DC: Preservation Press. ISBN 0-89133-128-X. (United States)
