= The Satirist =

Controversial 19th-century British newspaper

The Satirist, or the Censor of the Times
- Type: Weekly
- Founder: Barnard Gregory
- Founded: 1831
- Ceased publication: 1849
- Political alignment: Anti-Tory
- Headquarters: London
- Circulation: 10,000
- Sister newspapers: The Penny Satirist

The Satirist, or the Censor of the Times was a controversial 19th-century British newspaper which featured reports of scandals involving well known residents of London. It was published by Barnard Gregory, who faced multiple libel charges and was later imprisoned due to its articles. The Satirist was frequently criticised by commentators, and James Hain Friswell described it as a "poor imitation of Town and Country".

== History ==
The Satirist was first published on 10 April 1831, at that time it cost 7d. It was published weekly and released on Sundays. The paper became notorious for the allegations it published and the legal battles they provoked. The front page of the paper carried the motto, "Satire's my weapon. I was born a critic and a satirist; and my nurse remarked that I hissed as soon as I saw light". Though it never failed to gain an audience, public opinion eventually turned squarely against the paper. The Satirist published 924 issues, the last of which was released 15 December 1849. At its height the paper had a weekly circulation of over 9,000. But this had declined to just 1,200 copies per issue by 1848.

In many cases Gregory would send a draft of an article that he had prepared to the subject of the article and request a bribe to suppress its publication. This proved to be a lucrative practice for the paper. Gregory was sued for libel several times, however, and he was almost constantly involved in litigation during the eighteen years that he published the paper. Though the nature of the English justice system at the time made it difficult for slandered parties to enforce judgments against him, some wealthy targets of the paper managed to win cases against him, and he served several stints in prison as a result. In addition to legal attacks, some targets of the paper responded by publishing the same type of articles directed at the staff of The Satirist. After The Satirist published articles attacking the printer of the competing The Town newspaper, The Town's publisher, Renton Nicholson, retaliated with a series of scathing articles directed at Barnard Gregory.

== Topics ==
The Satirist covered accusations as serious as arson and as minor as individuals cheating while playing cards. One topic that it frequently covered, however, was affairs between wealthy men and their female servants. The Satirist also editorialised about the mistreatment of the poor. Gregory used his paper to become a prominent critic of the practice of medical schools using the bodies of deceased paupers for dissections. It also attacked Tory politics and published caricatures of its targets, reserving special disdain for the Duke of Cumberland and Queen Adelaide. Other notable targets of the paper included Sir James Hogg and the Duke of Brunswick. Both of these men brought Gregory to court over the articles he published about them and long legal court resulted. In one court battle between the Duke of Brunswick and Gregory, the Duke's lawyer claimed that The Satirist published, "divers indecent, obscene, lewd, filthy, and disgusting articles". Though it typically focused on stories set in London, The Satirist also published stories about foreign disasters.

The Satirist also had a sister publication known as the Penny Satirist which was devoted to exposing the transgressions of more obscure citizens.

== Bibliography ==
- Boase, G. C. (1904). "Gregory, Barnard" . Dictionary of National Biography. London: Smith, Elder & Co.
- Boyar, Ebru; Fleet, Kate (2010), A Social History of Ottoman Istanbul, Cambridge: Cambridge University Press, p. 376, ISBN 978-0-521-13623-5
- Friswell, James Hain (1880), A man's thoughts, London: Sampson Low, Marston, Searle & Rivington, p. 320
- MacDonald, Helen (July 2009), "Procuring Corpses: The English Anatomy Inspectorate, 1842 to 1858", Medical History, 53 (3): 379–396, doi:10.1017/s0025727300003987, PMC 2706054, PMID 19584958
- Rees, Joan (1985), Shelley's Jane Williams, London: William Kimber, p. 226, ISBN 978-0-7183-0549-9
- Robertson, Max, ed. (1913), "Gregory v. the Duke of Brunswick", The English reports, Volume 4, vol. 134, London: Stevens & Sons, p. 1227
- Vizetelly, Henry (1893), Glances back through seventy years: autobiographical and other reminiscences, vol. 1, London: Kegan Paul, Trench, Trubner & Co., p. 431
