= Town and Country Magazine =

British periodical (1769–1796)

- Founder: Archibald Hamilton
- Founded: 1769
- Ceased publication: 1796
- Political alignment: Non-political
- Headquarters: London

Town and Country Magazine was an 18th-century London-based publication that featured tales of scandals and affairs between members of London's upper classes.

== History ==
Town and Country Magazine was founded by Archibald Hamilton in 1769. It gained the name "Town and Country" because Hamilton had two offices, one in urban Clerkenwell and one in a rural area near Highgate. In the 1770s there was a dramatic increase in lawsuits brought by men and their wives' lovers in England. Many people became eager to read transcripts of adultery trials, seeing them as a form of soft-core pornography. Town and Country Magazine capitalised on the public's interest by running stories on the topic. The initial issues often made political points, but this focus was lost over time. By 1771 Town and Country Magazine claimed monthly sales of 12,000 copies, although some scholars argue that the actual number was significantly fewer. Prominent contributors included Thomas Chatterton and Thomas Holcroft. Town and Country Magazine was published until 1796 when it folded.

It has been credited with inspiring later papers, including The Satirist. The opening scene of the original production of The School for Scandal mentions Town and Country Magazine, which was the only publication mentioned by name in the play.

== Content ==
Town and Country Magazine was more upscale than many of its competitors, who focused on prostitutes and brothels. It printed stories about members of many different professions, although the most common subjects were "aristocratic rakes and their kept women". Town and Country Magazine featured what were known as Tête-à-Tête articles that detailed illicit meetings between members of society. The articles always featured oval miniature portraits of the subjects of the articles. While portions of the names of the involved parties were often partially redacted, it frequently was easy for readers to deduce their identities. Some of the stories that were published were fictional, but most were inspired by actual events.

== Bibliography ==
- Darnton, Robert (24 June 2004), "It Happened One Night", The New York Review of Books, 51 (11)
- Deelman, Christian (1962), "The Original Cast of The School for Scandal", Review of English Studies, 13 (51), Oxford University Press: 257–266, doi:10.1093/res/XIII.51.257
- Friswell, James Hain (1880), A man's thoughts, London: Sampson Low, Marston, Searle & Rivington, p. 320
- Grose, Jessica (5 September 2007), "Sophie Gee and "The Scandal of the Season": Digging up the social dirt on 18th century Britain", The New York Times
- Kinservik, Matthew (2007), Sex, scandal, and celebrity in late eighteenth-century England, New York: Palgrave Macmillan, p. 272, ISBN 978-1-4039-7992-6
- Masson, David (1856), "Chatterson", Essays biographical and critical: chiefly on English poets, Cambridge: Macmillan, p. 500, ISBN 9780841464919
- Pitcher, E.W. (1983), "A Reconsideration of Magazine Serials in The Town and Country Magazine", Library, s6-5 (2), Oxford University Press: 44–52, doi:10.1093/library/s6-5.1.44
- Rogers, Nicholas (1983), "Pigott's Private Eye: Radicalism and Sexual Scandal in Eighteenth-Century England" (PDF), Journal of the Canadian Historical Association, 4 (1): 247–263, doi:10.7202/031065ar
- Rosenthal, Michael (2006), "Public Reputation and Image Control in Late Eighteenth-Century Britain" (PDF), Visual Culture in Britain, 7 (2), Manchester University Press: 69–91
- Town Country Magazine archive at HathiTrust
