= Coal Hole, Strand =

Pub on Strand, London

The Coal Hole
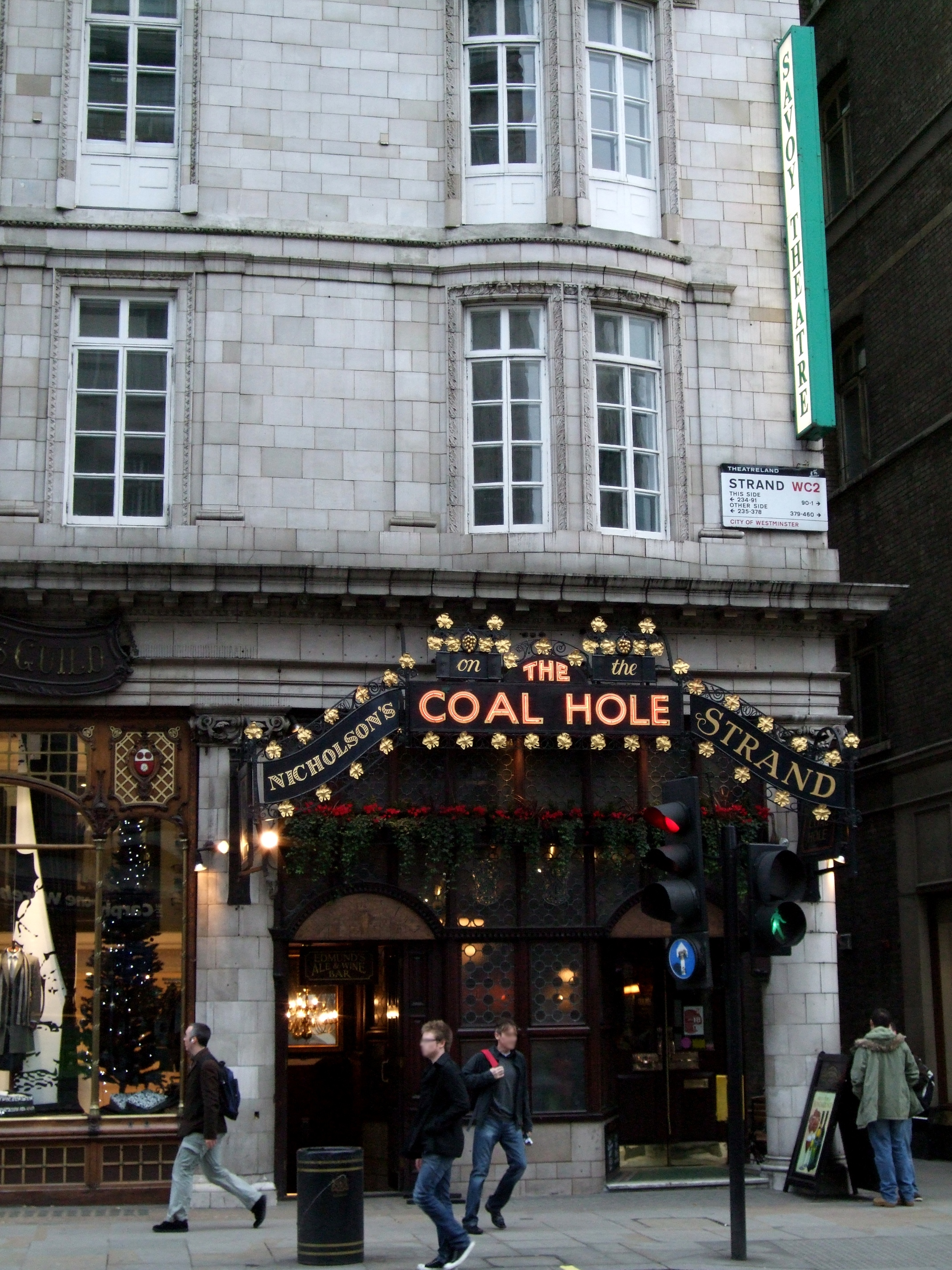
- The Coal Hole
- Interactive map of The Coal Hole
- Location: 91 Strand, London
- Coordinates: 51°30′37.44″N 0°7′16.68″W
- Built: 1903–04
- Architect: T. E. Collcutt

Listed Building – Grade II
- Official name: 89 to 95 (consec) Strand, including Nos 2 and 3 Savoy Court
- Designated: 1 December 1987
- Reference no.: 1264458

The Coal Hole is a Grade II listed public house at 91 Strand, London.

It is part of the Savoy Court, itself an extension of the Savoy Hotel complex, and was built in 1903–04 by the architect T. E. Collcutt.

It has no connection with the old Coal Hole Tavern in Fountain Court (nos. 16 and 17) where the Wolf Club met and Renton Nicholson held his Judge and Jury shows. That tavern was renamed the Occidental and it collapsed in 1887 when Terry's Theatre was built nearby.
