= Archibald Henning =

British painter (1805–1864)

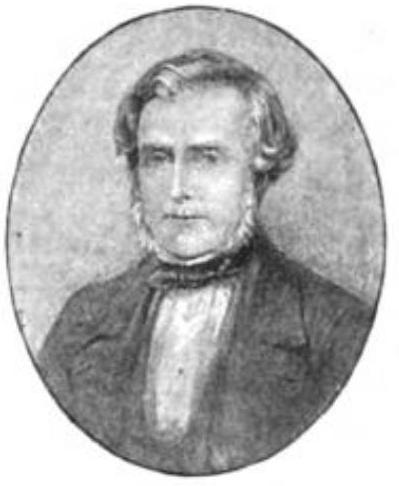
Portrait of Archibald Henning

Archibald Henning (1805–1864) (date of death also given as July 4, 1861) was a British illustrator best known for the illustrations that he drew for Punch.

== Works ==
Before working for Punch, Henning first contributed drawings to The Town. This was a paper known for reporting on scandals that was owned by Renton Nicholson and was published from 1837 to 1840. The Town frequently featured Henning’s drawings of notorious London residents on its front page. He often visited locations that were known for drawing lower class patrons and used what he saw there in his drawings, often depicting people who lived a Demimonde lifestyle.

Henning later became one of the first employees of Punch in 1841. He continued working there until the summer of 1842. Henning contributed eleven drawings to the first volume and several more to the second. He also wrote for Punch, notably contributing several humorous valentines messages. In addition to his work on Punch, he also contributed drawings for several other publications and painted for the Post Office as well. In 1843 a magazine that employed Henning claimed that Punch had plagiarised some of his recently published work. He also produced artwork for one of Nicholson's later venture, the Garrick’s Head and Town Hotel. Henning painted portraits on the exterior of the hotel which portrayed London celebrities attending events inside. He also drew a large frieze to Apsley House in Hyde Park.

== Family ==
Henning was the third son of the sculptor John Henning. Though his father was very punctual and focused on classical art, Archibald was known for his relaxed manner. He often focused his work on unrefined humour in the bohemian style. His brother in law Joseph Kenny Meadows was also an artist who contributed to Punch.

== Bibliography ==
- Blanchard, E. L. (1871), "'Baron' Nicholson", Notes and queries, 4, vol. 7, Oxford: Oxford University Press, p. 584
- Smith, John Thomas (1849), The streets of London, London: Richard Bentley, p. 209
- Spielmann, Marion Harry (1895), The history of "Punch", London: Cassell and company, limited, p. 592
- Vizetelly, Henry (1893), Glances back through seventy years: autobiographical and other reminiscences, vol. 1, London: Kegan Paul, Trench, Trubner & Co., p. 320
