= Sampson Low =

British bookseller and publisher (1797–1886)

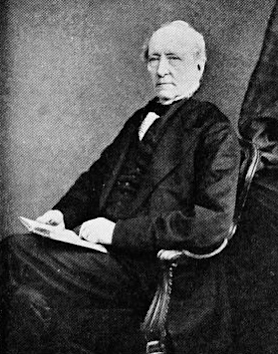
- Born: 18 November 1797; London, England
- Died: 16 April 1886 (aged 88); London, England
- Resting place: Highgate Cemetery, London
- Occupations: Bookseller and publisher

Sampson Low (18 November 1797 – 16 April 1886) was a bookseller and publisher in London in the 19th century.

== Early years ==
Born in London in 1797, he was the son of Sampson Low, printer and publisher, of Berwick Street, Soho. He served a short apprenticeship with Lionel Booth, the proprietor of a circulating library, and spent a few years in the house of Longman & Co.

Low began his own business in 1819 at 42 Lamb's Conduit Street, as a bookseller and stationer, with a circulating library attached. His reading-room was the resort of many literary men, lawyers, and politicians.

== Sampson Low, Son and Company ==
In 1848, Low and his eldest son Sampson Jr. opened a publishing office at the corner of Red Lion Court, Fleet Street. In 1852 they moved to 47 (and later to 14) Ludgate Hill, where, with the aid of David Bogue, an American department was opened. In 1856 Edward Marston became a partner, and Bogue retired. The firm removed in 1867 to 188 Fleet Street, in 1887 to St. Dunstan's House, Fetter Lane, and subsequently to Paternoster Row.

The firm issued works by authors such as William Black, William Henry Boulton, ECR Lorac, Julius Mendes Price, Nikolay Przhevalsky, Henry Morton Stanley, and Jules Verne. It also published the photographic work of Polish Count Stanisław Julian Ostroróg, known professionally as Walery Ltd., as "Celebrity Portraits" by Sampson Low & Co. in the late 1880s. The business continued to 1964. In 1968, Macdonald & Co. (Publishers) Ltd. co-located with Sampson Low at St Giles House, 49–50 Poland Street, and took over when Sampson Low finally ceased publishing in 1969.

=== Names of the firm ===
- Sampson Low, Son & Co.: Established in 1848 by Sampson Low and Sampson Low Jr. (1822–1871). Office located in Fleet Street, then in Ludgate Hill.
- Sampson Low, Son & Marston: Established in 1856 by Sampson Low, Sampson Low Jr., and Edward Marston.
- Sampson Low, Marston & Company: Established 1872 by Sampson Low, William Low, Edward Marston, and Samuel Warren Searle (d.1907).
- Sampson Low, Marston, Searle, & Rivington: Established before 1879 by Sampson Low, Edward Marston, Samuel Warren Searle, and William John Rivington (d. 1914). Office in Fleet Street, then St. Dunstan's House in Fetter Lane.

== Publishers' Circular and English Catalogue ==
Until 1837, Bent's Literary Advertiser was the only trade journal connected with book-selling; at this period the publishers became dissatisfied with the manner in which it was conducted, and established a periodical of their own called The Publishers' Circular, and entrusted the management to Low. The first number appeared on 2 October 1837. The manager gradually introduced many changes and improvements, and in 1867 the Circular became Low's sole property. The periodical, which was published fortnightly, supplied a list of new books, and from these lists an annual catalogue was made up, the first appearing in 1839. Upon these annual catalogues Low based his British Catalogue, the first volume of which, containing titles under authors' names of all books issued between 1837 and 1852, was published in 1853. It was continued as the English Catalogue, of which vol. i. (1835–63) appeared in 1864; vol. ii. (1863–72) in 1873; vol. iii. (1872–1880) in 1882. Subject indexes were issued in 1858, covering from 1837 to 1857; and in 1876 (covering from 1856 to 1876).

== Other professional activities ==
Low was also manager of a society for the protection of retail booksellers against undersellers, until the dissolution of the society in 1852.

With his son, he was instrumental in establishing in 1843 the Royal Society for the Protection of Life from Fire, and gave it careful attendance till 1867, when it was taken over by the Metropolitan Board of Works. From its foundation in 1837, he took the deepest interest in the Booksellers' Provident Institution, serving on the committee and acting as a vice-president. In about 1844, he made the acquaintance of Fletcher Harper of New York, and became his literary agent and correspondent, and one of the chief American booksellers in London.

== Personal life and death ==
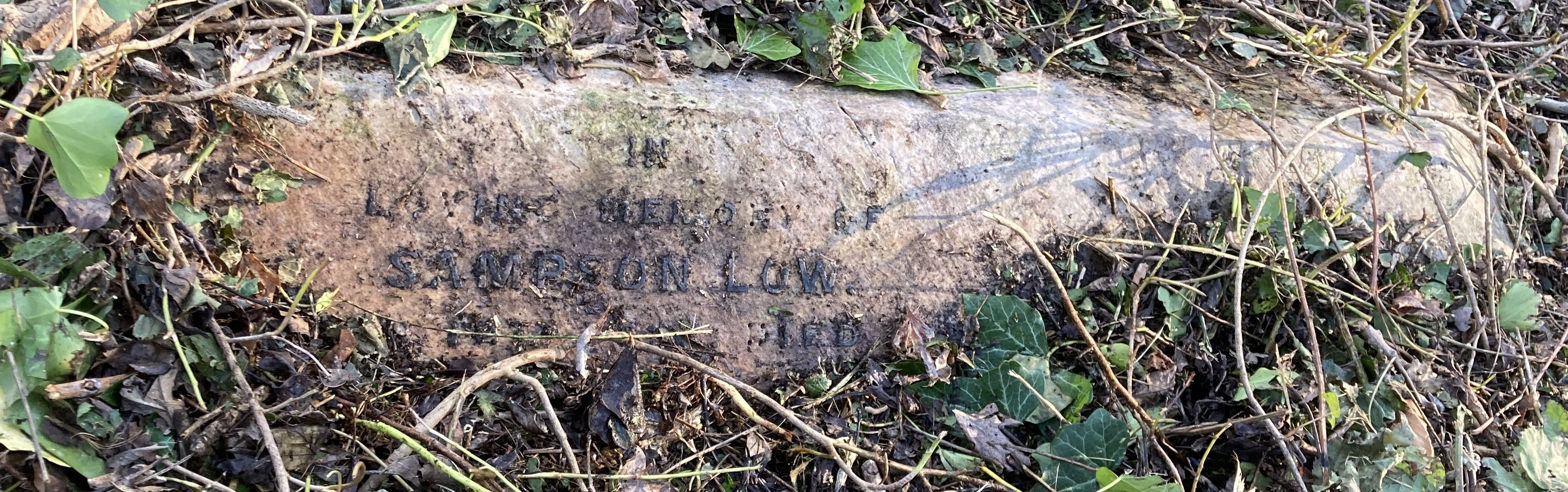
Grave of Sampson Low in Highgate Cemetery

Sampson Low retired from business in 1875, and died at 41 Mecklenburgh Square on 16 April 1886. He was buried on the west side of Highgate Cemetery on 22 April. His wife, Mary, died 26 May 1881, in her 84th year.

Of his sons, Sampson Low, Jr., born in London on 6 July 1822, although an invalid, took a considerable share in the business. He compiled a work entitled The Charities of London, comprehending the Benevolent, Educational, and Religious Institutions, their Origin and Design, Progress, and Present Position, 1850, of which corrected editions appeared in 1854, 1862, 1863, and 1870. He died at 41 Mecklenburgh Square on 5 March 1871. Low's second son, William Henry Low, after the death of his brother, took an active share in the publishing business; he died on 25 September 1881.

== Selected works ==
Author, compiler, and editor

- Low's Comparative Register of the House of Commons 1827 to 1841, 1841.
- Low's Comparative and Historical Register of the House of Commons 1841 to 1847, 1847.
- Index to Current Literature, comprising a Reference to every Book in the English Language as published, and to original Literary Articles, 1859–60 (eight numbers only).
- Low's Literary Almanack and Illustrated Souvenir for 1873, 1873.

Publisher

- The Bayard Series (series editor: James Hain Friswell)
- The Choice Series
- The Gentle Life series (series editor: James Hain Friswell)
- Standard Novels
