= Barnard Gregory =

British journalist, publisher and actor

Barnard Gregory (1796–1852) was a British journalist, publisher and actor. He published The Satirist from 1831 to 1849. He used this paper to publish the scandals of residents of London and often blackmailed his targets. Several articles that were published in the paper led to high-profile libel suits. As a result of these cases, he was imprisoned multiple times. Gregory was also a gifted Shakespearian actor, although his acting career was hindered by his poor reputation.

== The Satirist ==
Gregory was born in London in 1796 but did not receive public attention until he was in his thirties. In April 1831 he began publishing a weekly paper known as The Satirist, or the Censor of the Times. The paper focused on reporting scandals about of well known citizens of London. He also founded the Penny Satirist to cover scandals of less notable citizens. The Satirist often covered scandals such as infidelity and cheating in card games. Gregory also wrote editorials criticising Tory politicians and lamenting the mistreatment of the poor. One topic that it frequently covered was affairs between wealthy men and their female servants.

The paper was often used as a means to blackmail wealthy individuals. After Gregory identified a scandal, he often notified the individual that he intended to write about. He frequently requested a bribe in return for the suppression of the article, and many people were willing to pay. Although some subjects filed lawsuits against him, the legal system of the time made it difficult for them to force the courts to penalise him.

== Litigation ==
During the eighteen years that he published The Satirist, Gregory was almost continually engaged in litigation. Though he was skilled in navigating the justice system, he was convicted of libel in 1832 and 1833 and was fined over £300 in damages.

The Marquis of Blandford pressed libel charges against him in 1838. He filed the charges after The Satirist ran articles criticising him and his son, the Earl of Sunderland. During the case, Lord Denman described Gregory as "a trafficker in character".

That year Gregory also became embroiled in a public dispute with Renton Nicholson. Nicholson was the editor of The Town, a rival publication. The dispute began when The Satirist ran articles critical of the man who printed The Town. Nicholson retaliated with a series of scathing articles directed at Barnard Gregory. Gregory then pressed charges against Nicholson because of the content of the articles. Gregory's attempt to press charges against Nicholson was unsuccessful because he was imprisoned after a failed blackmail attempt. Gregory had attempted to blackmail Sir James Hogg, a Member of Parliament for Beverly. The legal husband of Jane Williams, who had left him for another man, had provided Gregory with the details of her marital status. Though Williams was legally married to John Edward Johnson, she had been living with Thomas Jefferson Hogg and purported to be his wife. The article that Gregory published incorrectly claimed that the wife of James Hogg was legally married to another man. James Hogg responded by filing a libel suit against Gregory. In February 1839 Gregory was convicted in the court of queen's bench of libel and imprisoned for three months. Although Gregory later learned that Thomas Jefferson Hogg was the intended subject of the scandal, he withheld the information at the request of Leigh Hunt.

=== The Duke of Brunswick ===
Gregory's most well known dispute was with Charles, Duke of Brunswick and Lüneburg. After he arrived in London, Charles received a great deal of negative press in England. The Satirist ran particularly cutting articles about him, one of which alleged that the Duke murdered a young woman. This article provoked the Duke to press charges. The case was first brought to court in November 1841 and the Duke won the case in 1843. Gregory was sentenced to spend six months in Newgate Prison. They were involved in litigation and appeals for over seven years. After the verdict was affirmed Gregory was briefly a fugitive from justice and the Duke offered a significant reward for his arrest. Gregory was soon apprehended and began his sentence. While he was in prison, Gregory handed over nominal control of his paper to a friend. During his term in Newgate, Gregory and his friends frequently complained that he was being poorly treated and had become ill as a result. In response, Punch ran an article arguing Gregory and other prisoners in his situation should be released early on health grounds. The Duke also filed suit against the printer of The Satirist. Though he won that suit, he was never able to recover the damages that he was awarded.

== Acting ==
In addition to his literary career, Gregory was a skilled actor and was an expert in the portrayal of Shakespearean characters. His acting career was thwarted by the disdain the public held for him. In February 1843 he was performing as Prince Hamlet in a production at Covent Garden when members of the audience began loudly whistling, catcalling and shouting at the stage. The group was led by the Duke of Brunswick, who signalled the crowd to begin their disruption from his private box. Gregory then filed conspiracy charges against the Duke in court. He alleged that the Duke had paid members of the crowd to disrupt the performance. During the trial, Gregory produced witnesses who admitted being paid by the Duke. The Duke's defence was that his actions were justified because of a man of Gregory's character should not be permitted to appear on the stage. His defence was successful and he was found not guilty.

In August 1846 Gregory was able to appear in several performances of Hamlet before crowds again began to disrupt his appearances. He also successfully appeared in Richard III at the Strand Theatre. In addition to acting, he wrote four plays, two of which were performed successfully.

== Personal life ==
In March 1847 Gregory married Margaret Thompson. He had previously been married and had a daughter with his first wife. Shortly before his wedding with Margaret, she inherited a large sum of money from an uncle. The combination of her inheritance and his savings made them fairly wealthy. Though he was notorious for the spiteful attacks he published in his paper, Gregory was generally very friendly and polite in his personal life. His friends described him as being amusing and clever. He often hosted well attended dinners at his house.

Gregory began suffering from a lung illness in 1849. He died three years later on 24 November 1852, St John's Wood. He is buried in Kensal Green Cemetery.

== Bibliography ==
- Boase, George Clement (1890). "Gregory, Barnard" . In Stephen, Leslie; Lee, Sidney (eds.). Dictionary of National Biography. Vol. 23. London: Smith, Elder & Co.
- Croft, H. J. (1881), Guide to Kensal Green Cemetery, London: J. Howell, p. 106, ISBN 9781145873599
- Friswell, James Hain (1880), A man's thoughts, London: Sampson Low, Marston, Searle & Rivington, p. 320
- MacDonald, Helen (July 2009), "Procuring Corpses: The English Anatomy Inspectorate, 1842 to 1858", Medical History, 53 (3): 379–396, doi:10.1017/s0025727300003987, PMC 2706054, PMID 19584958
- Rees, Joan (1985), Shelley's Jane Williams, William Kimber, ISBN 978-0-7183-0549-9
- Vizetelly, Henry (1893), Glances back through seventy years: autobiographical and other reminiscences, vol. 1, London: Kegan Paul, Trench, Trubner & Co., p. 431
