= Charles William Boase =

English academic, antiquarian and librarian

Charles William Boase (1828–1895) was an English academic, antiquarian and librarian.

== Life ==
Born in Chapel Street, Penzance, on 6 July 1828, was the eldest child of John Josias Arthur Boase (1801–1896) and his wife Charlotte (1802–1873), second daughter of Robert Shell of Truro; George Clement Boase was a younger brother. He was sent to Penzance grammar school to 1841, and then to Truro grammar school until 1846, From 1846 to 1849) he held an Elliot scholarship at Exeter College, Oxford, where he matriculated on 4 June 1846, from 1847 combined with an open scholarship. On 18 May 1850 he graduated B.A. with a second class in classics. He was elected to a Cornish fellowship on 30 June 1850, proceeded M.A. in 1853, and was ordained deacon at Cuddesdon by Bishop Samuel Wilberforce on 4 March 1855.

From the day of his matriculation for the rest of his life Boase lived at Exeter College, where he was assistant tutor 1853–5, tutor 1855–84, lecturer in Hebrew 1859–69, lecturer in modern history 1855–94, and librarian from 1868. Between 1857 and 1875 he examined in the schools, and he was appointed in 1884 the university reader in foreign history. He resigned this last appointment and his college lectureship of modern history (which he held for nearly forty years) in the summer of 1894, but he retained the place of librarian.

On the formation of the Oxford Historical Society in 1884 Boase was one of the honorary secretaries, and he acted on the committee to 1 June 1892. He died in his rooms at Exeter College on 11 March 1895, and was buried in St. Sepulchre's cemetery, Oxford, on 13 March. His library and manuscripts, including collections on Cornish genealogy, were dispersed at the time of his death. He was buried in St Sepulchre's Cemetery, Oxford.

== Works ==
In 1879, 200 copies were printed for private circulation of Boase's annotated Register of the Rectors, Fellows, Scholars [...] of Exeter College; a second edition, but without the introduction, came out in 1893, and a third edition, with the introduction revised and greatly expanded, formed vol. xxvii. of the publications of the Oxford Historical Society. The second part of the college register, containing a similar list of the commoners, was issued by him in 1894. He contributed to Andrew Clark's Colleges of Oxford the article on Exeter College.

The first publication of the Oxford Historical Society consisted of the Register of the University of Oxford, 1449-63, 1505–71, which Boase compiled and edited. He also wrote the preface to Thorold Rogers's Oxford City Documents, 1268-1665, which the society issued in 1891. The volume Oxford in the "Historic Towns" series was written by him.

Boase edited with George William Kitchin a translation in six volumes of Leopold von Ranke's History of England, himself translating the first volume. In with his two brothers he compiled an Account of the Families of Boase or Bowes, tracing ancestors back in West Cornwall to the end of the sixteenth century. The first edition was printed at Exeter in 1876 (seventy-five copies only for private circulation), and the second appeared at Truro in 1893 (a hundred copies only for private issue, and ten of these contained five additional sheets). He contributed to the Literary Churchman, The Academy, and English Historical Review, wrote the article "Macedonian Empire" in the Encyclopædia Britannica, 9th edition, and the lives of the Cornish saints in William Smith's Dictionary of Christian Biography.

== Notes ==
Attribution

This article incorporates text from a publication now in the public domain: Lee, Sidney, ed. (1901). "Boase, Charles William". Dictionary of National Biography (1st supplement). Vol. 1. London: Smith, Elder & Co.
