= Pauline Violante =

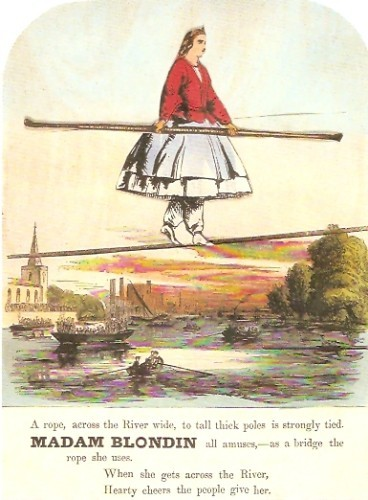
- "Madam Blondin" walks across the Thames
- Born: Selina Young; 1840 or 1841
- Occupation: tight rope walker
- Known for: walking on a tight rope across the River Thames

Pauline Violante born Selina Young a.k.a. the female Blondin (born c.1840) was a tightrope walker who walked across the River Thames.

== Life ==
Selina Young was born in 1840 or 1841. Her parents were performers. Her father's name was Young and he was a bandsman. Her mother was Elizabeth Wild and she had an elder sister.

Selina learned how to balance on a tight rope and in 1853 she was known as Pauline Violante and it was claimed that she was the first person to dance on tight rope. In 1858, she was the first person to walk on a high wire across the Crystal Palace.

She appeared at E.T. Wild's Alhambra Theatre of Variety in London's Leicester Square.

Edward Tyrrel Smith paid her to attempt to cross the Thames in Albanian costume on 12 August 1861. A wire that was too slack meant that she failed at the first attempt but she succeeded at her second try. She walked from Battersea Bridge to the Cremorne Gardens watched by 20,000 people. The Illustrated London News carried an engraving showing the number of boats that came out to observe the spectacle. She was advertised as Madam Blondin.

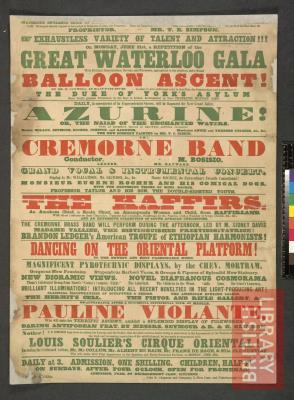
Pauline Violante at Cremorne Gardens

Her career ended at Highbury Barn, which was a pleasure resort that operated in Islington between 1861 and 1871. She was performing amongst a firework display when she fell fifty feet from a tight rope onto gravel on 14 August 1862. A group of doctors assisted as she had survived the fall but she had a badly broken left leg and a broken shoulder. After she had recovered she found that one of her legs was three inches shorter than the other and journalists reported that she asked the doctors if they would amputate the offending leg. Her situation led to a collection being organised that raised £300 which was used to create a shop business to support her and her father. She was last heard of when she married in 1864 Charles Greaves Junior.

She had attracted imitators including Sylvia Powell a.k.a. Madame Genieve. She and others would use her name to attract a crowd. Powell died in 1863 when she fell from the wire whilst heavily pregnant.

A man, Carlo Valerio, who tried to create another tight rope walk at Cremorne Gardens died when a hook broke and the wire fell and Valerio was killed. E.T.Smith who had been involved in Violante's walk over the Thames explained his involvement at the inquest into Valerio's death. Smith said that he would never again get involved with a similar performance.
