= William Prideaux Courtney =

British biographer and civil servant

William Prideaux Courtney (1845–1913) was a British biographer and civil servant. Writing as W. P. C., he was a contributor to the first edition of the Dictionary of National Biography. He was the brother of Leonard Courtney, 1st Baron Courtney of Penwith (1832–1918), and John Mortimer Courtney (1838–1920). As an administrator he worked for the Ecclesiastical Commissioners.

== Works ==
- "various articles". Dictionary of National Biography (1 ed.). London: Smith, Elder & Co. 1885–1900.
- Dodsley's Collection of Poetry. Arthur Lee Humphreys. 1910.
- Boase, George Clement; Courtney, William Prideaux (1874). Bibliotheca cornubiensis: A catalogue of the writings, both manuscript and printed, of Cornishmen, and of works relating to the county of Cornwall, with biographical memoranda and copious literary references. Longmans, Green, Reader and Dyer.
- Courtney, William Prideaux (1894). English whist and English whist players. Richard Bentley and Son.
- Courtney, William Prideaux; Smith, David Nichol (ed.) (1915). A bibliography of Samuel Johnson. Clarendon Press.
- Courtney, William Prideaux (1910). Eight Friends of the Great. p. 153 – via archive.org.
- Courtney, William Prideaux (1889). "The Parliamentary Representation of Cornwall to 1832".
