= Cremorne Gardens, London =

Former pleasure garden in London

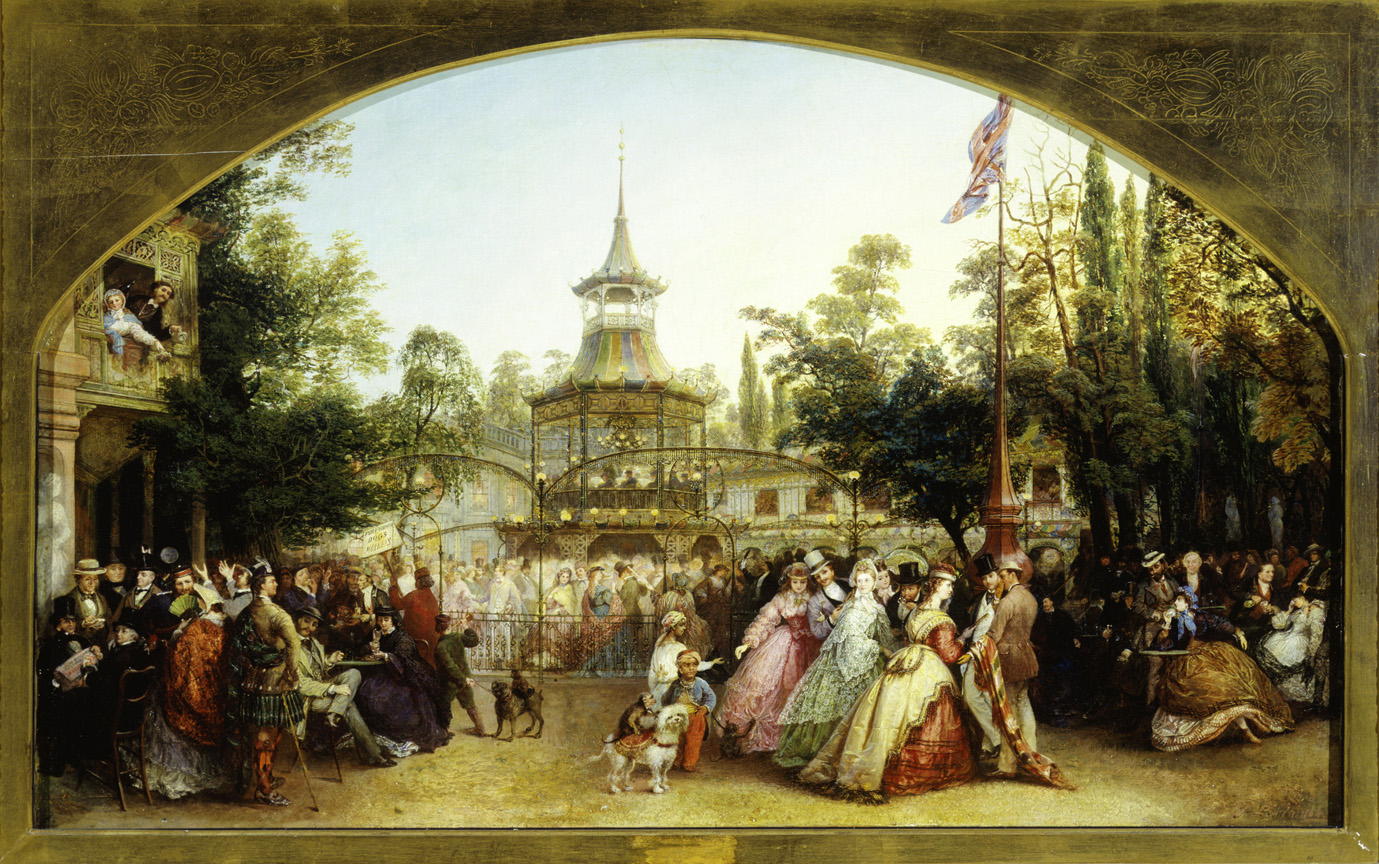
The Dancing Platform at Cremorne Gardens by Phoebus Levin, 1864.

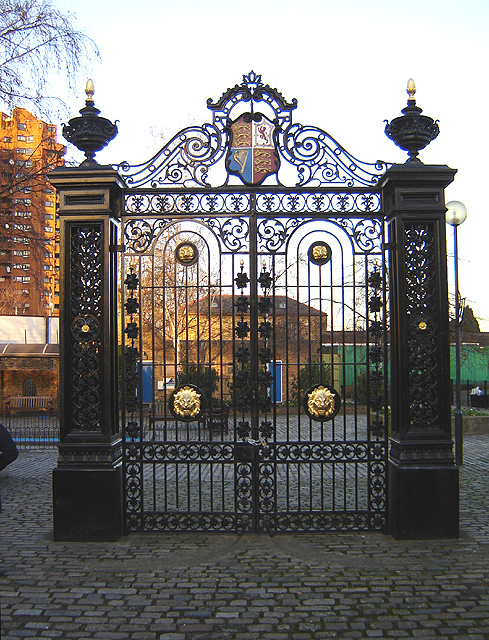
One of the original gates from Cremorne Gardens, recently restored and installed at the vestigial site. (January 2006)

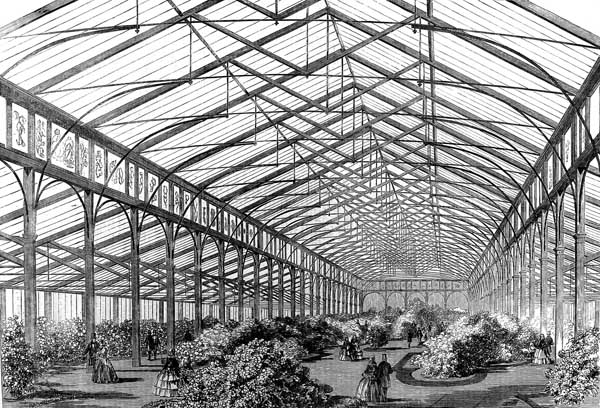
The Ashburnham Pavilion in 1858.

An 1865 map showing Cremorne Gardens. Kings Road is at the top and the River Thames is at the bottom right.

Cremorne Gardens were popular pleasure gardens by the side of the River Thames in Chelsea, London. They lay between Chelsea Harbour and the end of the King's Road and flourished between 1845 and 1877; today only a vestige survives, on the river at the southern end of Cheyne Walk.

Within the Chelsea area, Cremorne was a ward of the Royal Borough of Kensington and Chelsea from 2002 to 2014. The 2011 census assessed the population of the ward at 7,974.

== History ==
Originally the property of the Earl of Huntingdon (c. 1750), father of Steele's Aspasia, who built a mansion here, the property passed through various hands into those of The 1st Viscount Cremorne (1725–1813), an Irish peer from County Monaghan, who greatly beautified it.

The name Cremorne is the name of a barony, an old administrative unit, in County Monaghan in Ireland. It is an Anglicisation of what in modern Irish is Críoch Mhúrn. This roughly translates as the 'Bounds of Mourne', from the territorial domain of an ancient clan or sept called Mughdorna in Old Irish. The name is cognate with the Mountains of Mourne.

The property was sold by the Dawson family, Barons Cremorne, in 1831 to a Baron de Berenger, who was a convicted fraudster whose real name was Charles Random. De Berenger converted the site into a sports facility, called The Stadium, and became a proponent of self-defence techniques. The business failed in 1843, but not before de Berenger had added some attractions of pleasure gardens of the time, including hosting a balloon ascent in 1838. For two years the gardens opened for summer, including an opening festival billed as "Pie de Nie" with Balloon ascent, for instance, were held, and the property was sold in 1845. James Ellis took over the license in January 1845. The twelve-acre site was then developed by James Ellis into a proprietary place of entertainment and spectacle, being popular as such from 1845 to 1877. The Cremorne Gardens occupied a large site running between the Thames and the King's Road. Opened in 1845, they were noisy and colourful pleasure gardens featuring restaurants, entertainments, dancing and balloon ascents, and could be entered from the north gate on Kings Road or another by the Cremorne Pier on the river.

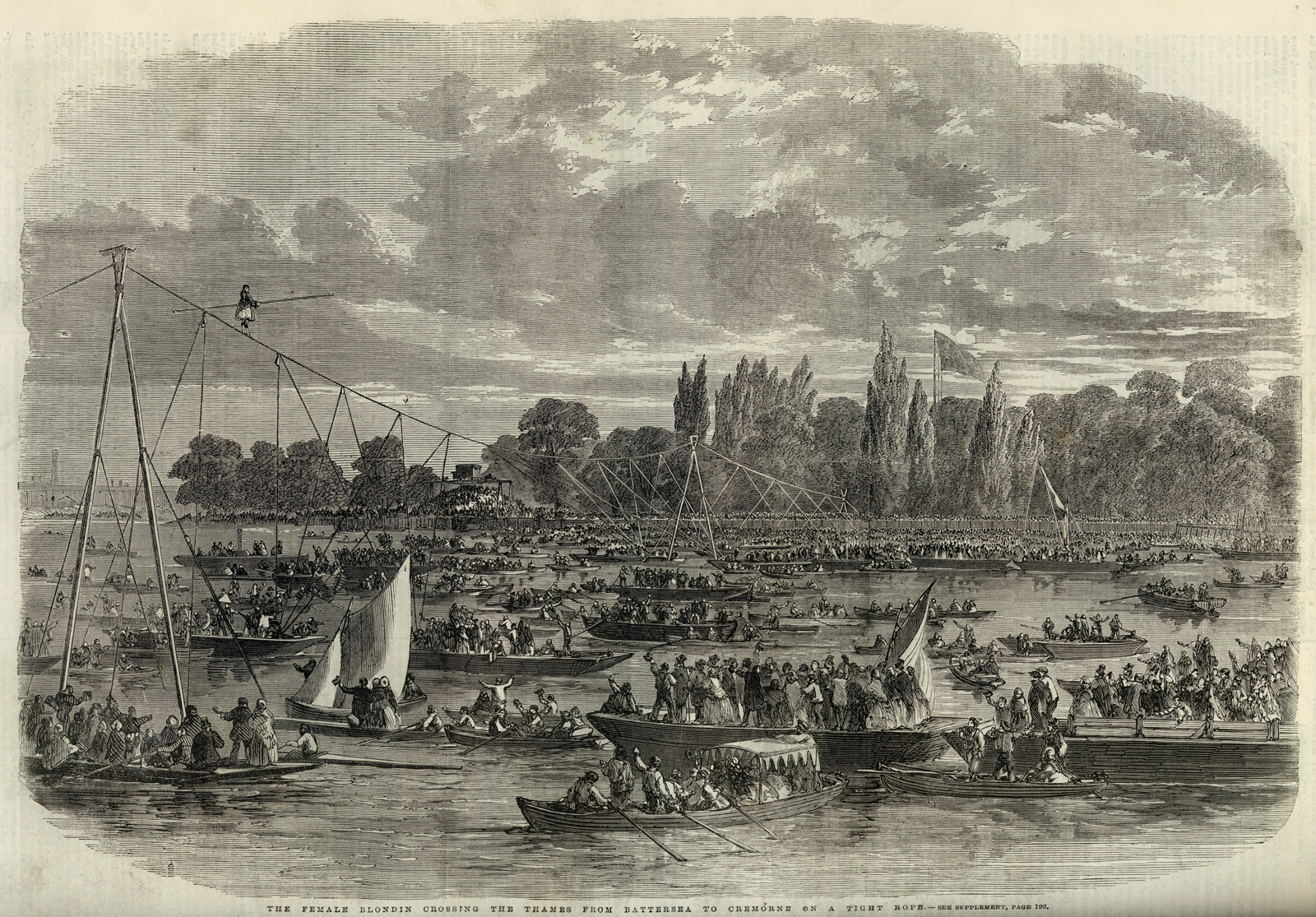
The Female Blondin crossing the Thames to Cremorne Gardens in 1861.

Edward Tyrrel Smith paid Pauline Violante to attempt to cross the Thames in Albanian costume on 12 August 1861. A wire that was too slack meant that she failed at the first attempt but she succeeded at her second try. She walked from Battersea Bridge to the Cremorne Gardens, watched by 20,000 people. Carlo Valerio would die in another tight rope demonstration at Cremorne Gardens.

The famous artist James Abbott McNeill Whistler painted several nocturnes of Cremorne Gardens between 1872 and 1877. He was a resident of Cheyne Walk, a mere few hundred yards from the Gardens. His painting Cremorne Gardens No 2 is full of fashionable and active figures and parallels to some extent the 'modern life' paintings of his French associates Manet and Tissot with whom he was in close contact during the early 1870s. Cremorne Gardens was doubtless a most attractive location, not only for its light displays but also for the brilliant array of fashionable people who gathered there. They provided the setting for Nocturne in Black and Gold: the Firewheel and Nocturne in Black and Gold: the Falling Rocket of c.1874, the latter resulting in the Whistler versus Ruskin trial of 1878.

Walter Greaves was the son of a Chelsea boatbuilder who used to ferry Turner across the river; Walter and his brother Harry also performed the same service for Whistler, and in about 1863 became his unpaid studio assistants and pupils. They adored Whistler, accompanied him wherever he went, imitated his dress and manner, made the frames for his canvases, bought his materials and prepared his colours. Walter said; "He taught us to paint, and we taught him the waterman's jerk". Their close association lasted well into the 1890s, Whistler favouring Walter as he was the more gifted of the two brothers. Two of his most successful images were Regatta at Hammersmith Bridge and Chelsea under Snow; like Whistler he concentrated on areas around the Thames. He died in poverty, having been taken in by the Charterhouse.

Greaves chooses to depict Whistler near the Crystal Platform. A reporter in the Illustrated London News (30 May 1857) admired the structure's "inclosing ironwork...enriched, by Defries and Son, with devices in emerald and garnet cut-glass drops, and semicircles of lustre and gas jets, which have a most brilliant effect." The pavilion was about three hundred and sixty feet in circumference. It was encrusted with ornamental pillars, gas jets, and over forty plate-glass mirrors in black frames. In the upper portion of the pagoda (seen here), where the orchestra played, there were seventeen gas lit chandeliers.

This particular feature of the Gardens was clearly a favourite with Greaves as he chose to depict it on several occasions, for example The Dancing Platform, Cremorne Gardens (1870s) and in an etching of this period, which depicts the same view as Whistler in the Cremorne Gardens. In the former Whistler is depicted as the natty flaneur, striding along with and yet separate from the crowd. In the latter Whistler is seated but maintains the image of flaneur, the impartial, non-judgmental observer of contemporary life. He leans to one side to acknowledge a fellow dandy, much to the impatience of the young woman who stands at his table. Cremorne Gardens rapidly acquired a reputation as the territory of the demi-monde frequented by women of questionable morals. His associate could buy such a woman; this is implied by his indifference towards her, the attention of the passing woman as well as the undisguised stare of the gentleman at the railing.

Whistler and the Greaves family were frequent visitors before the gardens closed in 1877. Cremorne Gardens never acquired the fashionable fame of Vauxhall Gardens, and finally became so great an annoyance to some of the more influential residents in the neighbourhood that a renewal of its licence was refused, and most of the site of the gardens was soon built over. The name survives in Cremorne Road.

Donald James Wheal, in his first-person memoir of life in working-class Chelsea, World's End gives a lively account of the almost-forgotten history and destruction of Cremorne Gardens.

== Today ==
A vestige of the gardens survives next to the Thames, just east of Lots Road Power Station. It is largely paved over, and there is little to suggest the grand scale of the original gardens, though it still has two attached jetties, an echo of the landing stages where visitors to the original pleasure gardens would arrive by boat. Recently, one of the original grand iron gates from the gardens has been restored and stands on the current site 51.47983°N 0.17834°W. A Cremorne Gardens was also established in Melbourne, Australia.

Cremorne Gardens secured a Green Flag award for the first time in 2010 as one of the best green spaces in England. Councillor Nicholas Paget-Brown, Cabinet Member for Environment and Leisure Services, attended the flag raising ceremony at Cremorne Gardens at the end of July along with the mayor of Kensington and Chelsea, Councillor James Husband.

On 13 September 2010 Thames Water published its preferred sites for building work on its Thames Tideway super sewer. Thames Water originally proposed that an access road cut straight through Cremorne Gardens.

Local Conservative Kensington and Chelsea Councillors and residents have promised to try to save the Gardens from use as an access road to build the Thames Tunnel.. Phil Stride representing Thames Water stated "We are happy to work with the council to use whatever access route they can help us find." Early in 2011, the Lots Road Waste Centre owned by the council ceased operation. The former Waste Centre is closer to the proposed Tideway Tunnel, therefore is an alternative site for the access road. However, Cremorne Gardens is still listed as the preferred site on the Thames Water website even though it is the council's decision.

In 2014, Cremorne Gardens was again under threat from the local council which suggested to Transport For London that there be a "Chelsea West" station on Kings Road near World's End and on the site of the Cremorne Estate for Crossrail Two. Cremorne Gardens would have been destroyed to use as the building site for the station. After a huge outcry from residents, the council abandoned its support for Chelsea West.

== In popular culture ==
The BBC drama Desperate Romantics regularly depicted the Pre-Raphaelite Brotherhood meeting prostitutes in Cremorne Gardens. In the novel Royal Flash by George MacDonald Fraser, the main character, scoundrel Harry Flashman, briefly mentions the gardens as part of the itinerary of a proposed evening of drunken debauchery with his old school-friend Speedicut.

In Strong Poison, a Lord Peter Wimsey mystery, Dorothy L. Sayers named a character Cremorna Garden. Cremorna was an actress of dubious repute, no doubt so named after the garden's racy reputation.

In Coral by Compton Mackenzie (1925) in which Coral Avery, an upper-class girl, falls in love with her chauffeur, she gets him to drive down the Embankment to the Cremorne Arms at Chelsea reach, where they declare their love for each other.

Cremorne Gardens features as a setting in the novel A Dangerous Fortune by Ken Follett (1993).

Cremorne Gardens features prominently as a setting in the novel Garden of Sins by Laura Joh Rowland (2022).

== References and sources ==
Sources

- The Victorian Dictionary
- Cremorne Gardens in Old and New London, Volume 5 (1878)
- bdonline
