= Phoebus Levin =

German painter

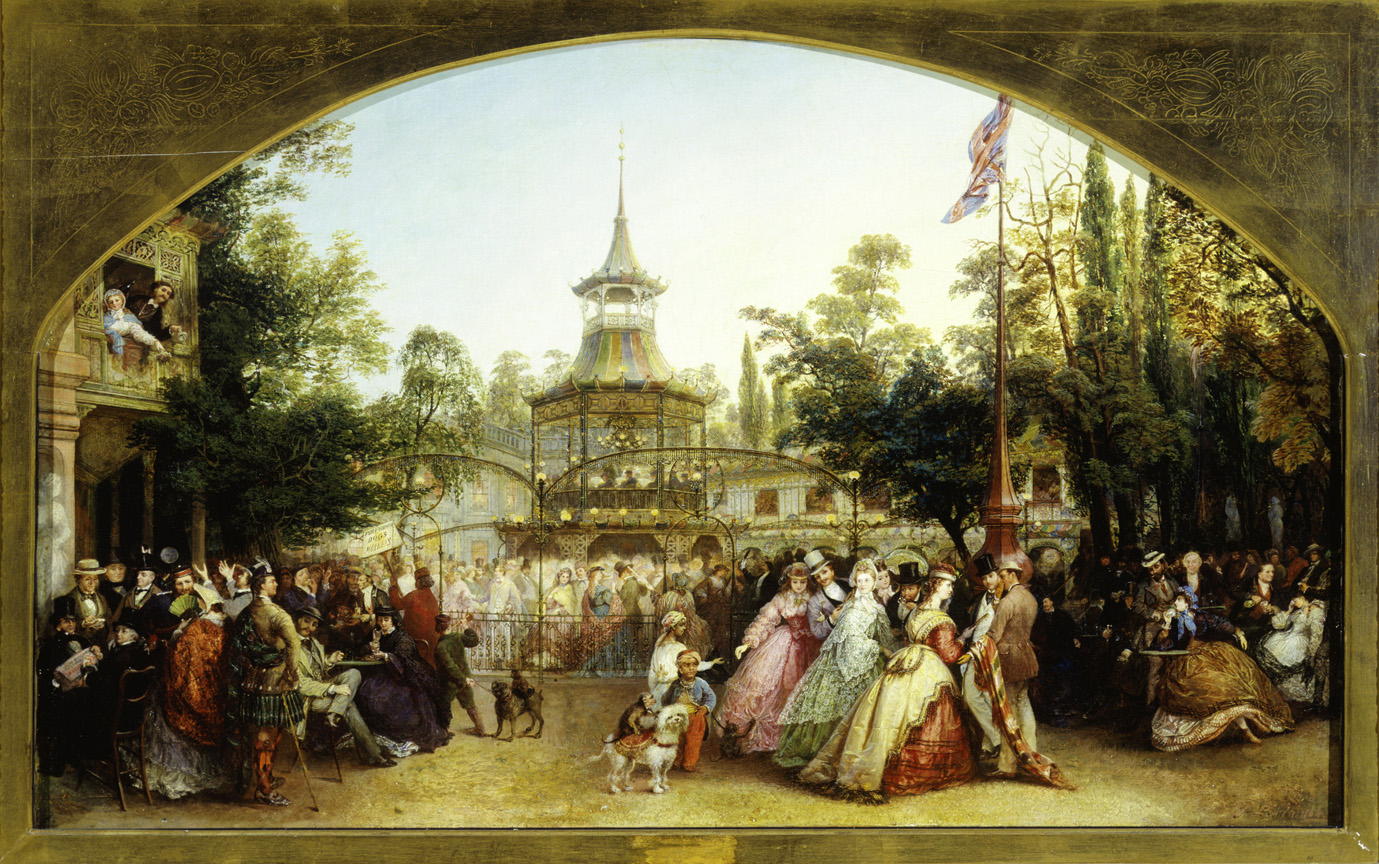
The Dancing Platform at Cremorne Gardens, Phoebus Levin, 1864. Oil on canvas. 66 x 107 cm. Museum of London.

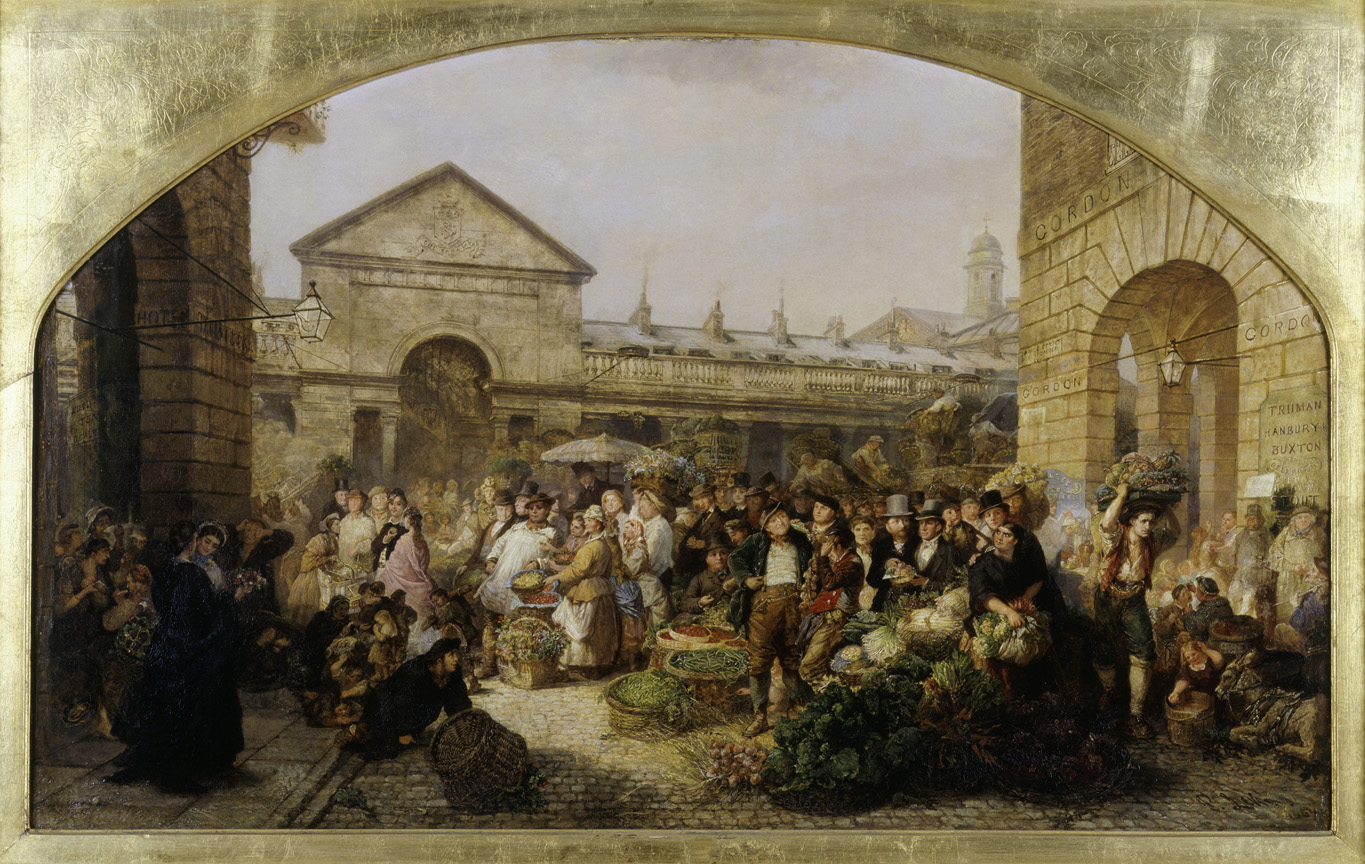
Covent Garden Market, Phoebus Levin, 1864. Oil on canvas. Museum of London.

Phoebus Levin (fl. mid-1800s) was a German painter working in London (1855–78) who is known for his 1864 painting of The Dancing Platform at Cremorne Gardens and other depictions of Cremorne Gardens and Covent Garden.

Levin's date of birth and death are uncertain; however, according to the Benezit Dictionary of Artists, he was a pupil at the Kunstakademie Berlin from 1836 to 1844, and participated in their exhibitions until 1868.
