= James Hain Friswell =

English essayist and novelist (1825–1878)

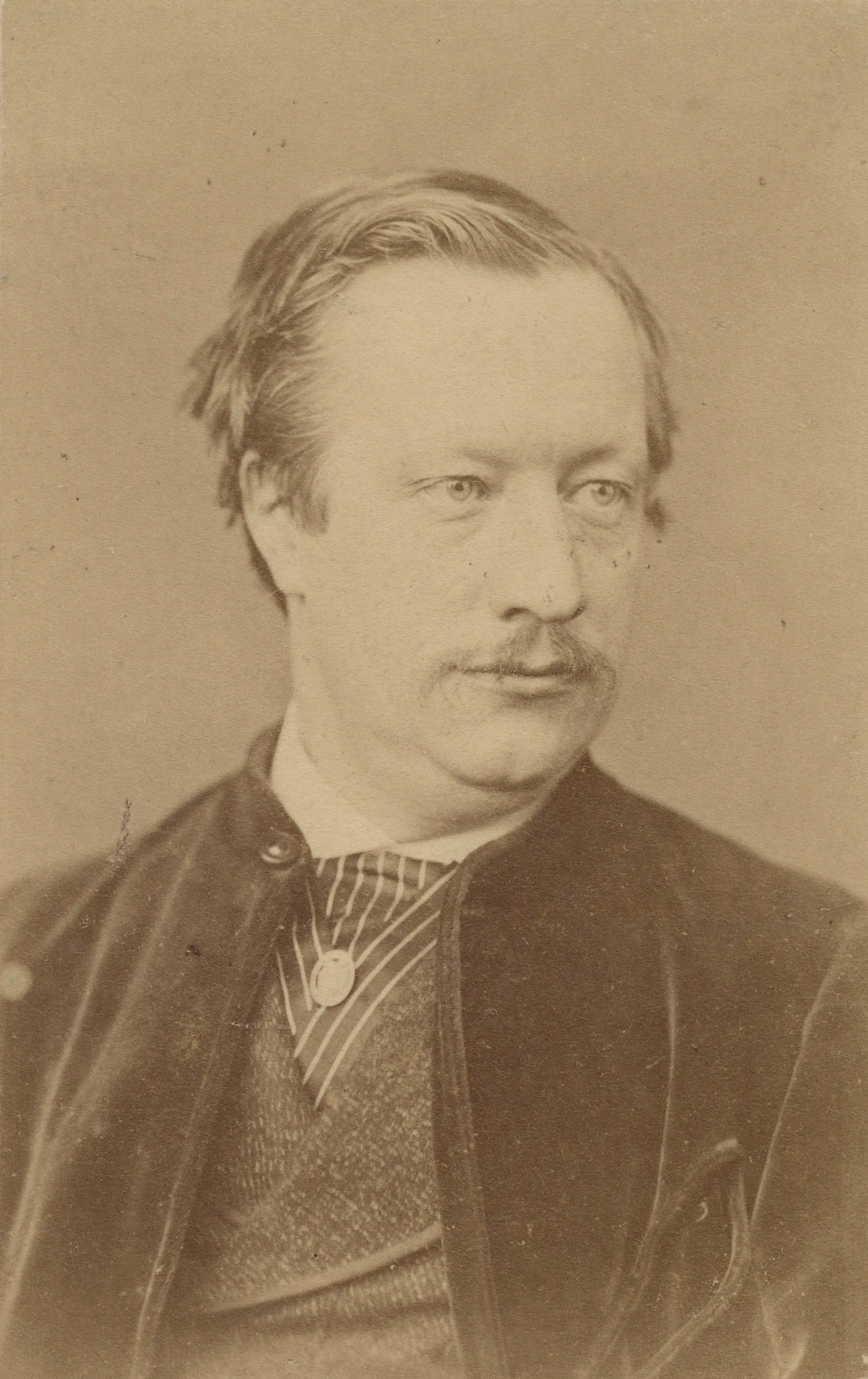
Carte-de-visite by Elliott & Fry

James Hain Friswell (8 May 1825 – 12 March 1878) was an English essayist and novelist.

He was born at Newport, Shropshire, son of William Friswell, of 93 Wimpole Street, London, attorney-at-law, and educated at Apsley School, near Woburn, Bedfordshire. He was intended for the legal profession, which he did not enter, but for some years was obliged to follow a business which was uncongenial to his tastes. He early showed a preference for literature, and contributed in 1852 to the Puppet Show, conducted by Angus B. Reach and Albert Smith. Much of his life was devoted to the defence of Christianity.

He was a frequent contributor to Chambers's Journal, The Leader, The Spectator, the London Review, the Saturday Review, and the Pictorial World. His first successful works were Houses with the Fronts off, brought out in 1854, and Twelve inside and one out. Edited from the Papers of Mr. Limbertongue, which appeared in the following year. In January 1858 he founded the Friday Knights, a social society, the name of which was changed to the Urban Club on 15 Nov. 1858. One of his most useful publications was Familiar Words, a Collection of Quotations, a work of much labour, which he produced in 1864. In the same year he wrote his best-known work, The Gentle Life, which became very popular, and ran to upwards of twenty editions, including an edition dedicated by desire to Queen Victoria. His own periodical, The Censor, a Weekly Review of Satire, Politics, Literature, and Arts, enjoyed but a short life, only running from 23 May to 7 Nov. 1868.

He was the projector and editor of the Bayard Series, a Collection of Pleasure Books of Literature, published by Sampson Low & Co., and he also edited the Gentle Life Series, the latter series consisting chiefly of reprints of his own writings. In 1867 he was a contributor to the Evening Star under the signature of Jaques. While on a visit to Richard Brinsley Sheridan at Frampton Court, Dorsetshire, in December 1869, whither he had been invited to meet John Lothrop Motley, author of the Rise of the Dutch Republic, he ruptured a blood-vessel. He was henceforth a confirmed invalid, but continued to work till within a few hours of his death.

In 1870 he produced Modern Men of Letters honestly criticised. George Augustus Henry Sala, whose life was very severely commented on in this work, brought an action for defamation of character against Hodder & Stoughton, the publishers of the book, and obtained 500 pounds damages. In the advancement of the working classes Friswell took a great interest, delivering lectures, giving readings, and forming schools for their instruction. He also laboured earnestly to reform cheap literature for boys, and his efforts were successful in repressing the circulation of some of the most notorious of the Penny dreadful publications. The majority of his essays attained great popularity; but his novels did not possess the elements of enduring life. His poetry was memorably savaged by Tennyson in hendecasyllables: "...he, the would-be poet,/Friswell, Pisswell - a liar and a twaddler - ".

He died at his residence, Fair Home, Bexley Heath, Kent, on 12 March 1878, aged 52.

== Works ==
- The Russian Empire, its History and Present Condition of its People, 1854.
- Houses with the Fronts off, 1854.
- Blackwood's Comic Zadkiel, an Almanac at once Prophetical and Profitable, 1855.
- Twelve inside and one out, 1855.
- Songs of the War. Edited with Original Songs, 1855.
- Diamonds and Spades, a story of Two Lives, 1858.
- Ghost Stories and Phantom Fancies, 1858.
- Out and About, a Boy's Adventures, 1860.
- Footsteps to Fame, a Book to open other Books, 1861.
- Sham, a Novel written in earnest, 1861.
- The Young Couple, and Miscellanies, 1862.
- A Daughter of Eve, a novel, 1863.
- About in the World, essays, 1864; 6th ed. 1879.
- The Gentle Life, Essays in Aid of the Formation of Character, 1864; 21st ed. 1879.
- Life Portraits of Shakespeare, a history of the various representations of the Poet, 1864.
- A Splendid Fortune, a novel, 1865.
- Familiar Words, an Index Verborum, or a Quotation Handbook, 1865; 5th ed. 1880.
- Francis Spira, and other poems, 1865.
- Varia, Readings from Rare Books, 1866.
- Essays by Montaigne, edited and compared, 1866.
- The Countess of Pembroke's Arcadia, by Sir Philip Sidney, with notes and introductory essay, 1867.
- Other People's Windows, a series of sketches, 2 vols. 1868, 3rd ed. 1876.
- The Silent Hour, Essays for Sunday Reading, 1868.
- The Gentle Life, 2nd ser. 1868; 11th ed. 1879.
- Like unto Christ, a translation of the De Imitatione Christi of Á Kempis, 1868.
- Essays on English Writers, 1869.
- Essays on Mosaic, by T. Ballantyne, with a preface, 1870.
- Modern Men of Letters honestly criticised, 1870.
- One of Two, a novel, 3 vols. 1871.
- Pleasure, a Holiday Book, 1871.
- Reflections, by F. de Rochefoucauld, with introduction, notes, and an account of the author and his times, 1871, with John William Willis-Bund
- A Man's Thoughts, 1872.
- Ninety Three, by V. M. Hugo, translated, 1874.
- Ward's Picture Fables from Æsop, told anew in Verse, 1874.
- The Better Self, Essays from Home Life, 1875.
- Our Square Circle, completed by his daughter, L. H. Friswell, 1880.
- Christmas Eve in Custody, printed in Mixed Sweets, 1867
- Magical Ointment, printed in The Savage Club Papers, 1868.
