= George Clement Boase =

English bibliographer and antiquary

George Clement Boase (20 October 1829, in Penzance – 1 October 1897, in Lewisham) was an English bibliographer and antiquary.

== Biography ==
Boase's father was a banker, and Boase himself took up banking in Cornwall and London as a young man from 1846 to 1854. In 1854 Boase voyaged to Australia: arriving at Melbourne, he obtained work as tutor to the children of Thomas Darchy at the Murrumbidgee River, New South Wales and also worked as correspondent for the Sydney Morning Herald. In 1864 he returned to London, managing the business of Whitehead & Co., provision merchants until taking retirement in 1874.

Like his elder brother, Charles William Boase, Fellow and Librarian of Exeter College, Oxford and his younger brother, the biographer Frederic Boase, George Boase now took up bibliographical pursuits. As well as the works listed below, he compiled the Cornish part of W. W. Skeat's Bibliographical List of the Works... Illustrative of the Various Dialects of English (1877) and helped John Ingle Dredge with his work on Devon bibliography. He was a prolific contributor to Notes and Queries, the Western Antiquary and the Dictionary of National Biography.

== Works ==
- (as 'A Brother') To husbands, fathers, and brothers, specially those of the labouring classes being a warning against prevailing delusions, and a word in season to the weary and heavy laden, 1848
- (with William Prideaux Courtney) Bibliotheca Cornubiensis. A catalogue of the writings, both manuscript and printed, of Cornishmen, and of works relating to the county of Cornwall, with biographical memoranda and copious literary references, 3 vols., London, 1874-1882 Also known as Collectanea Cornubiensia .
- (with C. W. Boase and Frederic Boase) An Account of the Families of Boase or Bowes, 1876
- Collectanea Cornubiensia, Netherton & Worth, Truro, 1890
