= Stowe House =

Country house in Buckinghamshire, England

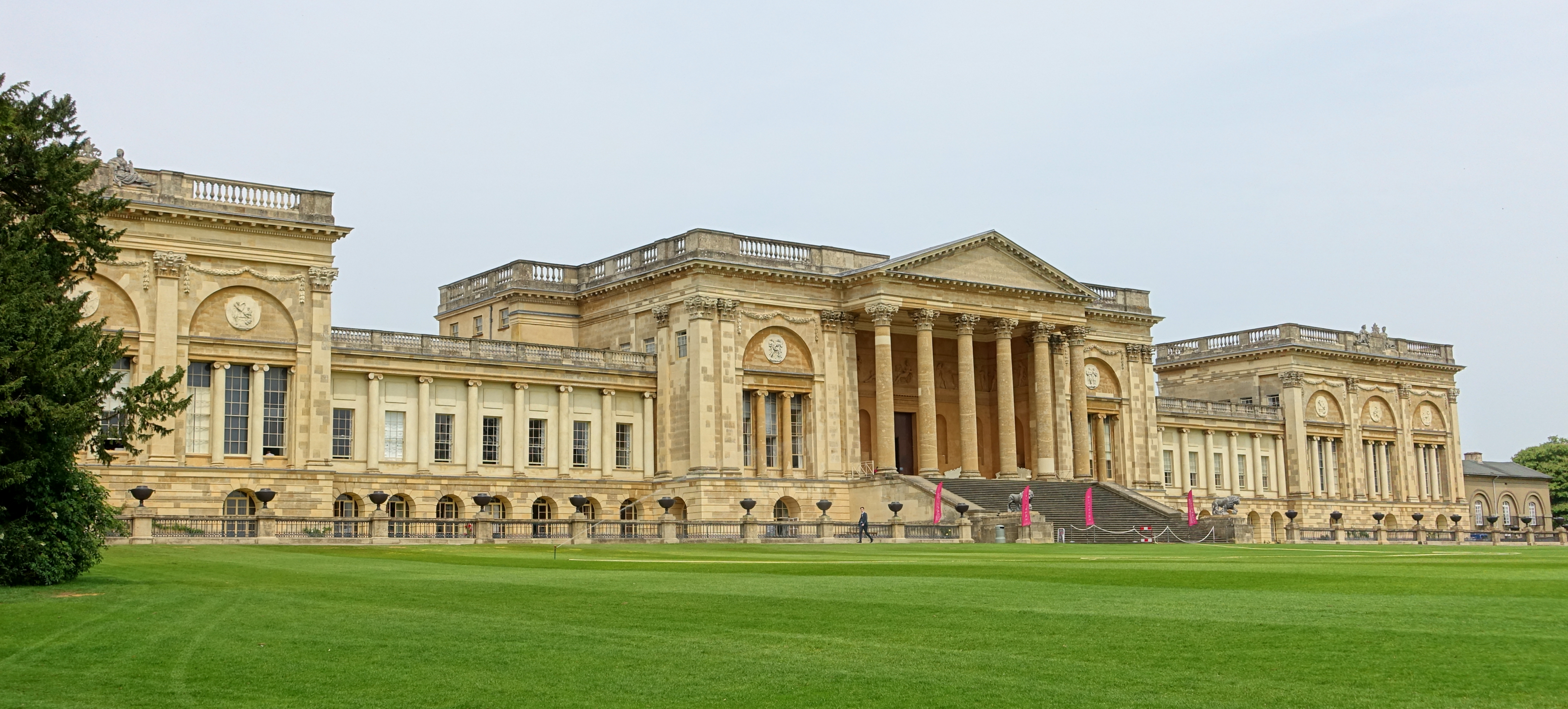
- The south front of the house by Robert Adam

- Location within Buckinghamshire

General information
- Architectural style: English Baroque, Palladian, Neoclassical
- Location: Buckingham, Buckinghamshire, United Kingdom
- Coordinates: 52.031963°N 1.017560°W
- Years built: 1677–1683; 1720–1733; 1740–1760; 1770–1779

Design and construction
- Architects: John Vanbrugh; James Gibbs; William Kent; Giacomo Leoni; Giovanni Battista Borra; Robert Adam; Vincenzo Valdrè; John Soane; Edward Blore

Listed Building – Grade I
- Official name: The Mansion with Attached Service Ranges
- Designated: 25 September 1951
- Reference no.: 1289788

National Register of Historic Parks and Gardens
- Designated: 30 August 1987
- Reference no.: 1000198

Stowe House is a Grade I listed country house in Stowe, Buckinghamshire, England. It is the home of the private Stowe School and is owned by the Stowe House Preservation Trust. Over the years, it has been restored and maintained as one of the finest country houses in the UK. Stowe House is regularly open to the public.

The gardens (known as Stowe Gardens, formerly Stowe Landscape Gardens) are a significant example of the English landscape garden and, along with the parkland, passed into the ownership of the National Trust in 1989. Members of the National Trust have free access to the gardens, but there is a charge for all visitors to the house, which goes toward the costs of restoration. The gardens and most of the parkland are listed Grade I separately from the house. The park and gardens saw 213,721 visitors during 2020/21.

== History ==
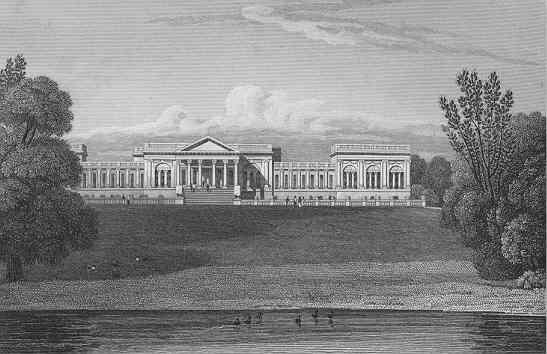
The south or garden front of Stowe from Jones' Views of the Seats of Noblemen and Gentlemen (1829). All of the top floor windows in the earlier version of this front were sacrificed for the sake of architectural effect. The remaining top floor rooms all face sideways.

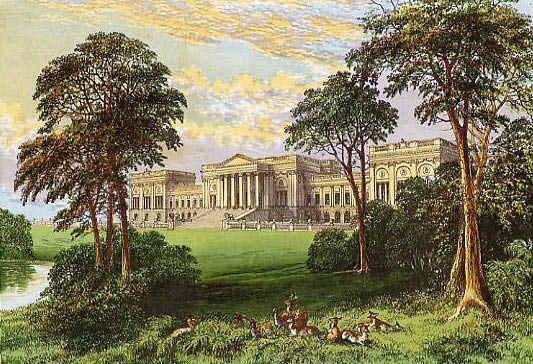
Stowe circa 1880

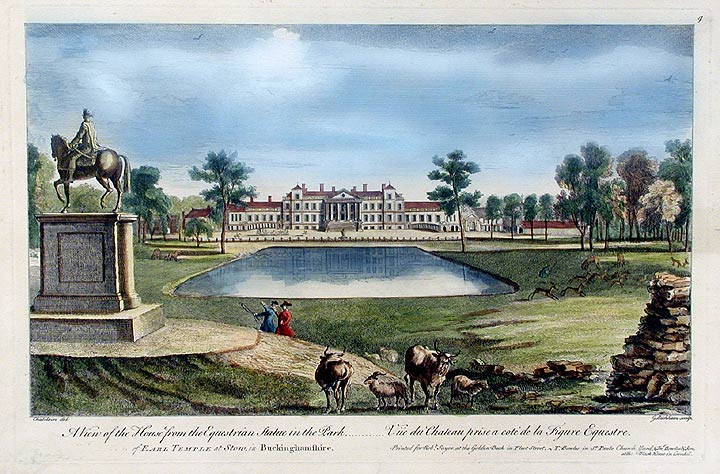
The north or entrance front in 1750. Major alterations were made after that date.

The medieval settlement of Stowe clustered around the parish church of St Mary's, Stowe. From 1330, Osney Abbey maintained a manor house at Stowe occupied by a steward. Osney Abbey retained Stowe until it was forced to surrender its estates to the Crown in the dissolution of the monasteries in 1539.

Sir George Gifford owned Stowe Manor and Rectory. He willed it to his son Thomas Gifford (born about 1542 died 16 February 1593). The Stowe estate was leased from Thomas Gifford in 1571 by Peter Temple whose son, John Temple, bought the manor and estate of Stowe in 1589 and it eventually became the home of the Temple family. Their family fortune was based on sheep farming, at Witney in Oxfordshire, and in 1546 they rented a sheep farm in Burton Dassett in Warwickshire. In the late 17th century, the house was completely rebuilt by Sir Richard Temple, 3rd Baronet, (c.1683) on the present site. This house is now the core of the mansion known today.

== House ==
=== Architectural history ===
The house is the result of four main periods of development. Between 1677 and 1683, the architect William Cleare was commissioned by Sir Richard Temple to build the central block of the house. This building was four floors high, including the basement and attics and thirteen bays in length. Cleare had worked as Christopher Wren's chief joiner and based the design of the house on that of Coleshill.

From the 1720s to 1733, under Richard Temple, 1st Viscount Cobham, additions to the house included the Ionic north tetrastyle portico by John Vanbrugh, as well as the re-building of the north, east and west fronts. After Vanburgh's death in 1726, work continued under William Kent, and it was probably he who designed the now-demolished two-tier south portico, which consisted of four Tuscan columns with four Ionic or Composite columns above.

From the 1740s to 1760, under Viscount Cobham, the western and the eastern state apartments were expanded.

From 1770 to 1779, Richard Grenville-Temple, 2nd Earl Temple obtained a first design from Jacques-François Blondel for the new south front of the house. However this design did not meet with the Earl's approval, in 1771 Robert Adam produced a new design for the south front; this design was adapted and made more uniform by Thomas Pitt assisted by Giovanni Battista Borra and was finished in 1779. The interiors of the new state apartments were not completed until 1788, much of the interior work being by an Italian, Vincenzo Valdrè (1740–1814).

At the same time, the final remodelling of the North Front was taking place: this involved the erection in 1770–1772 of the two twin quadrant colonnades of Ionic columns that flank the façade. These may be to Adam's design. The northern ends of the colonnades are linked to screen-walls containing gateways by William Kent which were moved from the forecourt to this position and heightened in 1775 by Valdrè. The east gateway leads to the stable court the west to the kitchen court. At right angles to these walls stand the arches designed by Giacomo Leoni c. 1740; these were formal entrances to the gardens, they now lead to various buildings put up by the school.

The exterior of the house has not been significantly changed since 1779, although in the first decade of the 19th century, the Egyptian Hall was added beneath the North Portico as a secondary entrance.

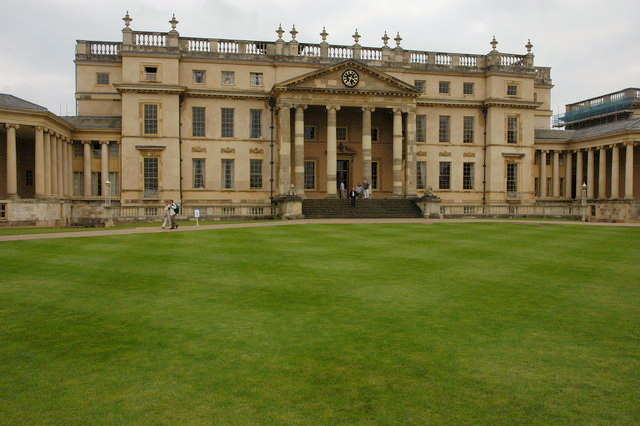
The centre of the North Façade

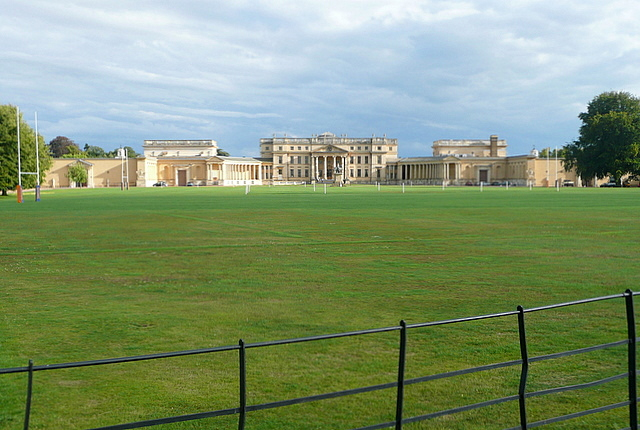
The North Façade

=== The south façade ===
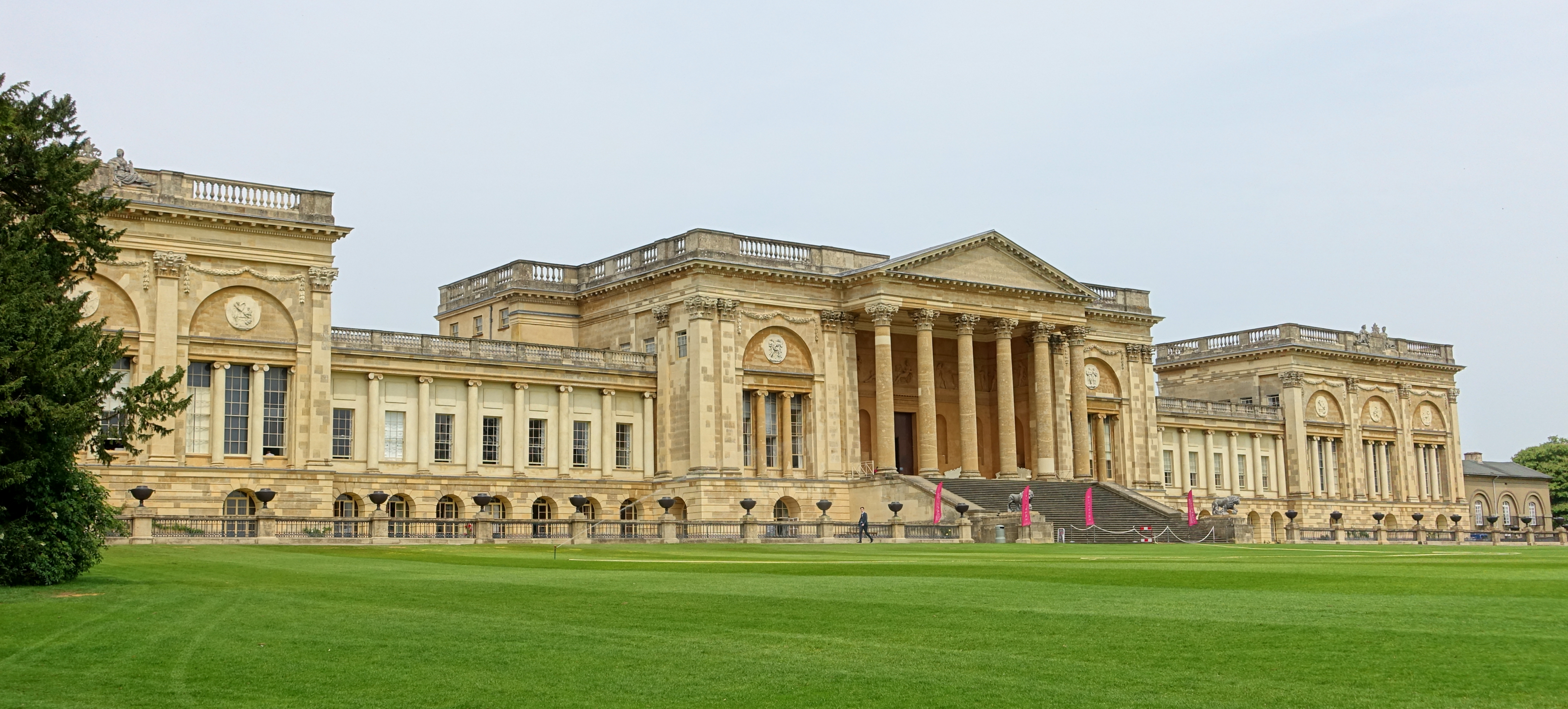
The South Façade

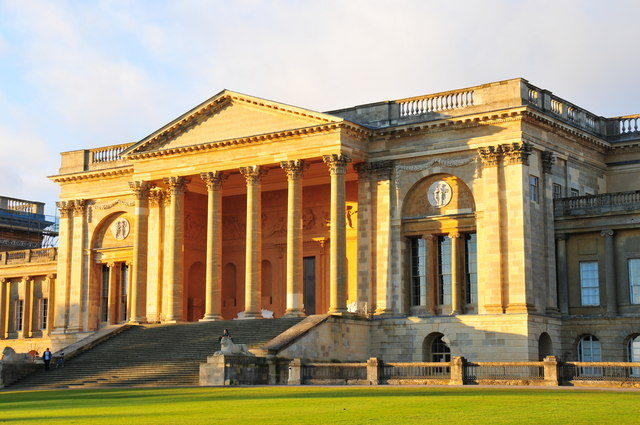
The centre of the South Façade

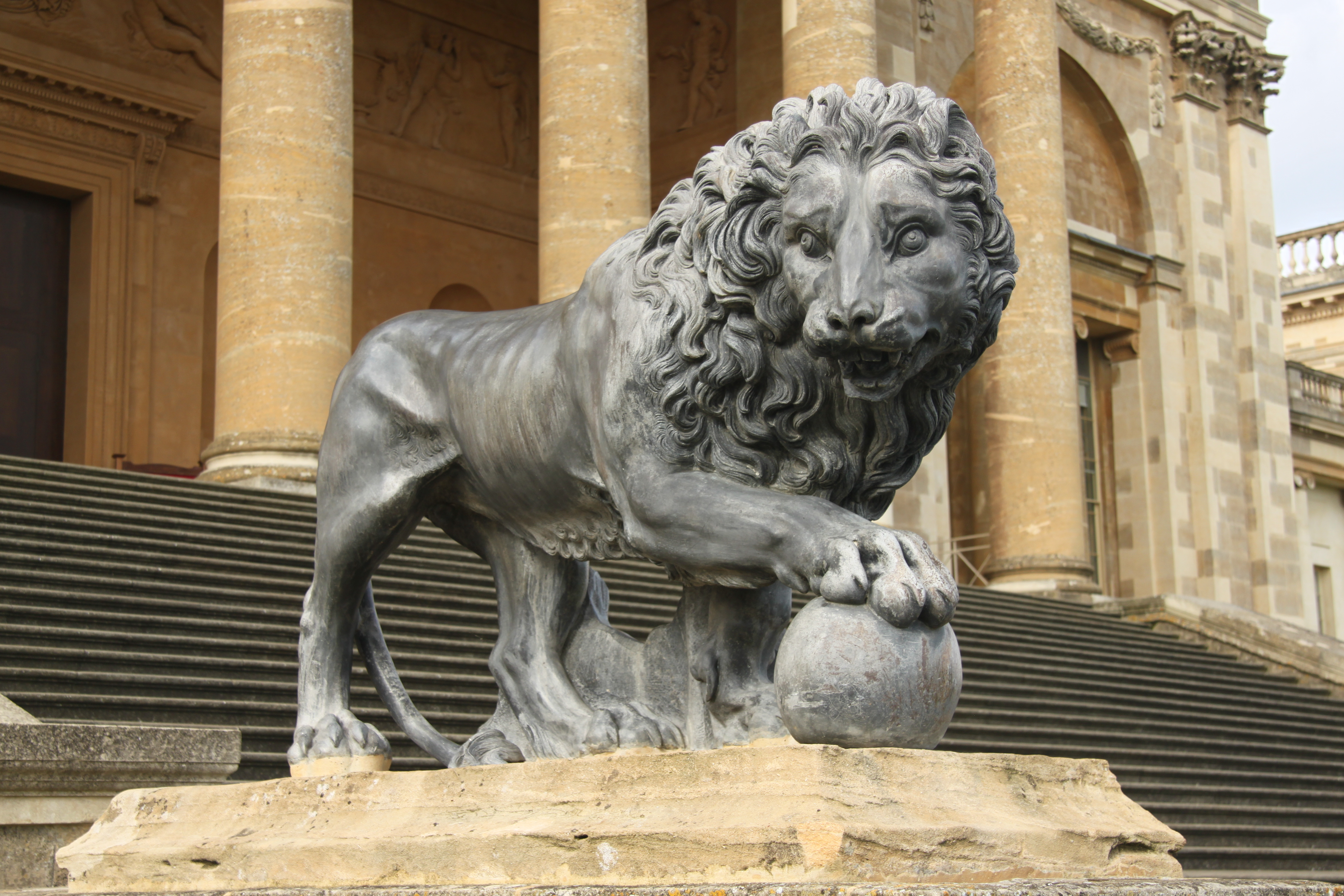
Medici lion

The showpiece of the House is the south façade overlooking the gardens. This is one of the finest examples of neoclassical architecture in Britain. The main front stretches over 460 feet (140 m). Divided into five major sections, these are: the central block around 130 feet (40 m) in width, the lower linking sections 75 feet (23 m) wide that contain on the west the State Dining Room and on the east The Large Library, then at the ends the two pavilions the same height as the central block about 90 feet (27 m) in width. The central block and the end pavilions are articulated at piano nobile level with unfluted Corinthian pilasters over 35 feet (11 m) tall which becomes a hexastyle portico supporting a pediment in the middle of the façade, there is a minor order of 48 Ionic columns over 20 feet (6.1 m) high that runs the length of the façade. The portico fronts a loggia that contains the doorway to the Marble Saloon, this is flanked by large niches that used to contain ancient Roman statues, between the columns of the portico used to be the marble sculpture of Vertumnus and Pomona by Laurent Delvaux now in the Victoria and Albert Museum. Above the niches is a large frieze on a Bacchic theme, this is based on an engraving in James Stuart's and Nicholas Revett's Antiquities of Athens of the frieze on the Choragic Monument of Lysicrates.

There is a flight of thirty-three steps the full width of the portico which descends to the South Lawn. The staircase has solid parapets either side that end in sculptures of Medici lions standing and resting a paw on a ball. These are the original lions dating from the late 1700s. They were sold in 1921 to Blackpool Corporation and had been standing in Stanley Park in Blackpool but were reinstated in 2013 in a swap deal that saw copies going to Blackpool. Either side of the portico are two tripartite windows separated and flanked by Ionic columns. These are enclosed with an arch that contains a carved Portland stone tondo in the tympanum with carvings of the four seasons, and is in turn flanked by twin Corinthian pilasters the same size as the columns of the portico. The façade is surmounted by a balustraded parapet, in the centre of the parapet of the east pavilion is a sculpture of two reclining figures of Ceres and Flora the corresponding figures on the west pavilion are of Liberty and Religion. The end pavilions each have three tripartite windows matching those on the central block, the tondos of which are each carved with a sacrificial scene.

The ground floor is lower than the floor above, about 15 feet (4.6 m) in height and visually acts as a base to the façade, it is of banded rustication with simple arched windows beneath each window on the upper floor. In 1790 a balustrade was added parallel to the façade that ran from the bottom of the steps the full length of the house and then returned at both ends, there are a series of 30 pedestals along the balustrade, that until their sale in 1921 were topped by bronze urns. These were replaced by replicas in 2013. This was probably added to keep visitors from the lower windows of the house, and formal flower beds were laid out in the area.

=== Stowe Library ===
In 1793 George Nugent-Temple-Grenville, 1st Marquess of Buckingham, converted The East Gallery into The Large Library and, in the first decade of the 19th century, on the ground floor created the Gothic Library to the designs of Sir John Soane. This is a rare example of Soane using the Gothic style.

In 1834, Richard Temple-Nugent-Brydges-Chandos-Grenville, 1st Duke of Buckingham and Chandos, inherited the library of Lord Grenville, his uncle, of which in 1824 The Times had claimed

in history, philosophy, political economy, mathematics, diplomatic state papers, both printed and manuscript, is the most perfect collection in this country.

Following the bankruptcy of Richard Temple-Nugent-Brydges-Chandos-Grenville, 2nd Duke of Buckingham and Chandos in 1847, much of the valuable collection was sold. The library has provided provenance to many valued manuscripts including the Stowe 2 Psalter, Stowe 54, the Stowe Breviary and the "Stowe manuscripts".

=== The major interiors ===
Several owners of Stowe undertook the Grand Tour, Earl Temple spent 1729–1733 in France, Switzerland & Italy, the 1st Marquess in 1774 visited Italy, the 2nd Duke before he inherited his title in 1817, and the 1st Duke in 1827–1829 toured the Mediterranean aboard his yacht the Anna Eliza named after his wife. Many of the art works that adorned the house were acquired both during these trips and through the 1st Duke inheriting his father-in-law's art collection. The 1st Duke, before he inherited Stowe, also bought paintings at the sale of the Orleans Collection in 1798 and continued to buy paintings for another twenty years as well as books, engravings and the Stowe Service of Worcester Porcelain, as well as archaeological specimens. The main rooms are mainly located on the 1st floor (referred to in the US as the 2nd floor) Piano nobile, a few are on the ground floor (referred to in the US as the 1st floor).

During the sales of 1921 and 1922, all the remaining furnishings and art works not sold in 1848 were auctioned, as were several fittings, including chimneypieces. Some of the family portraits and other items associated with the house have since been bought back and are now on display in the house.

The piano nobile of Stowe. The front entrance is at D. The Marble Saloon is B. Rooms P and Q also served as the state dressing room and bedroom at times. For scale, rooms O and L are each 75 feet (23 m) long. There are service wings to either side which are not shown.

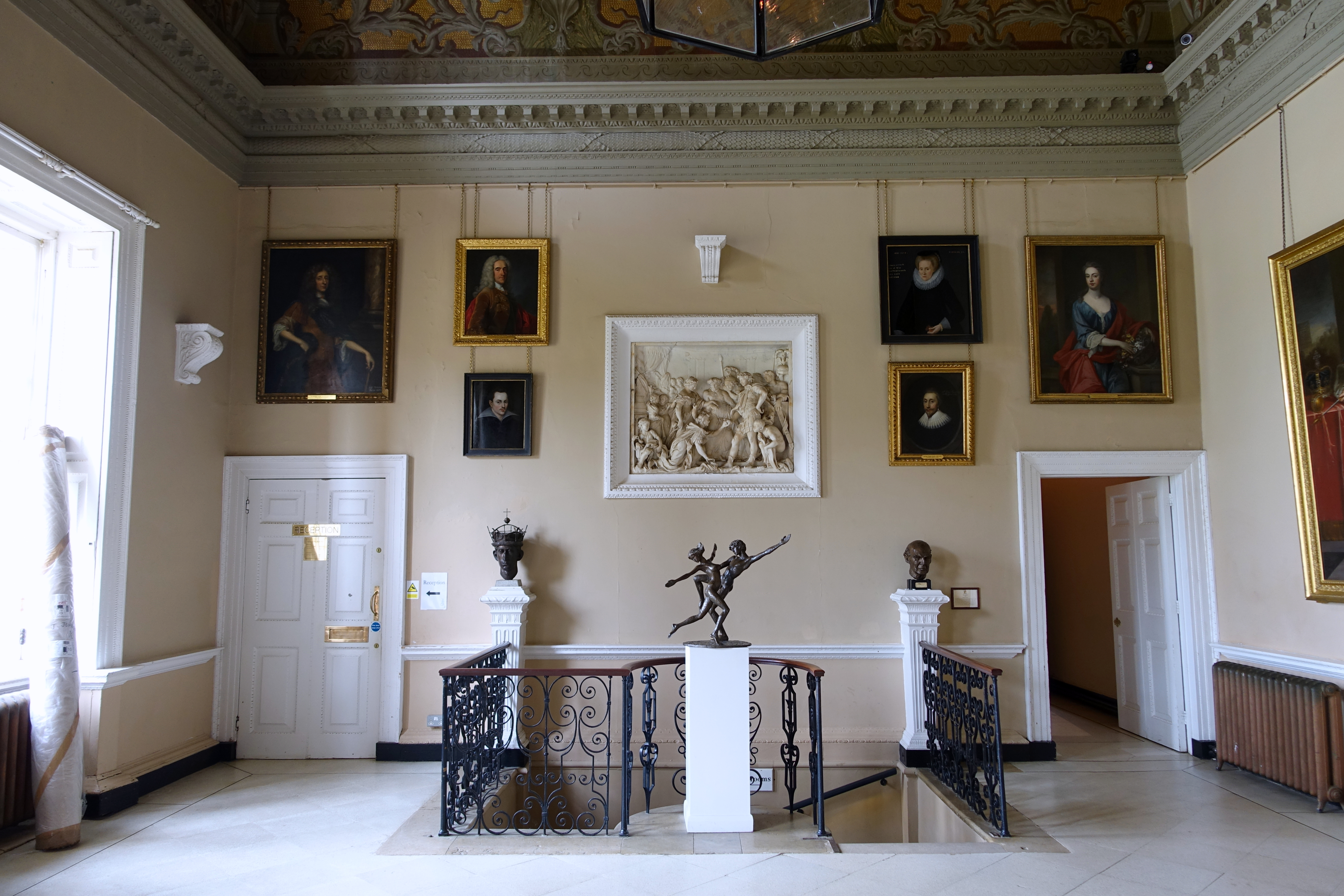
The North Hall

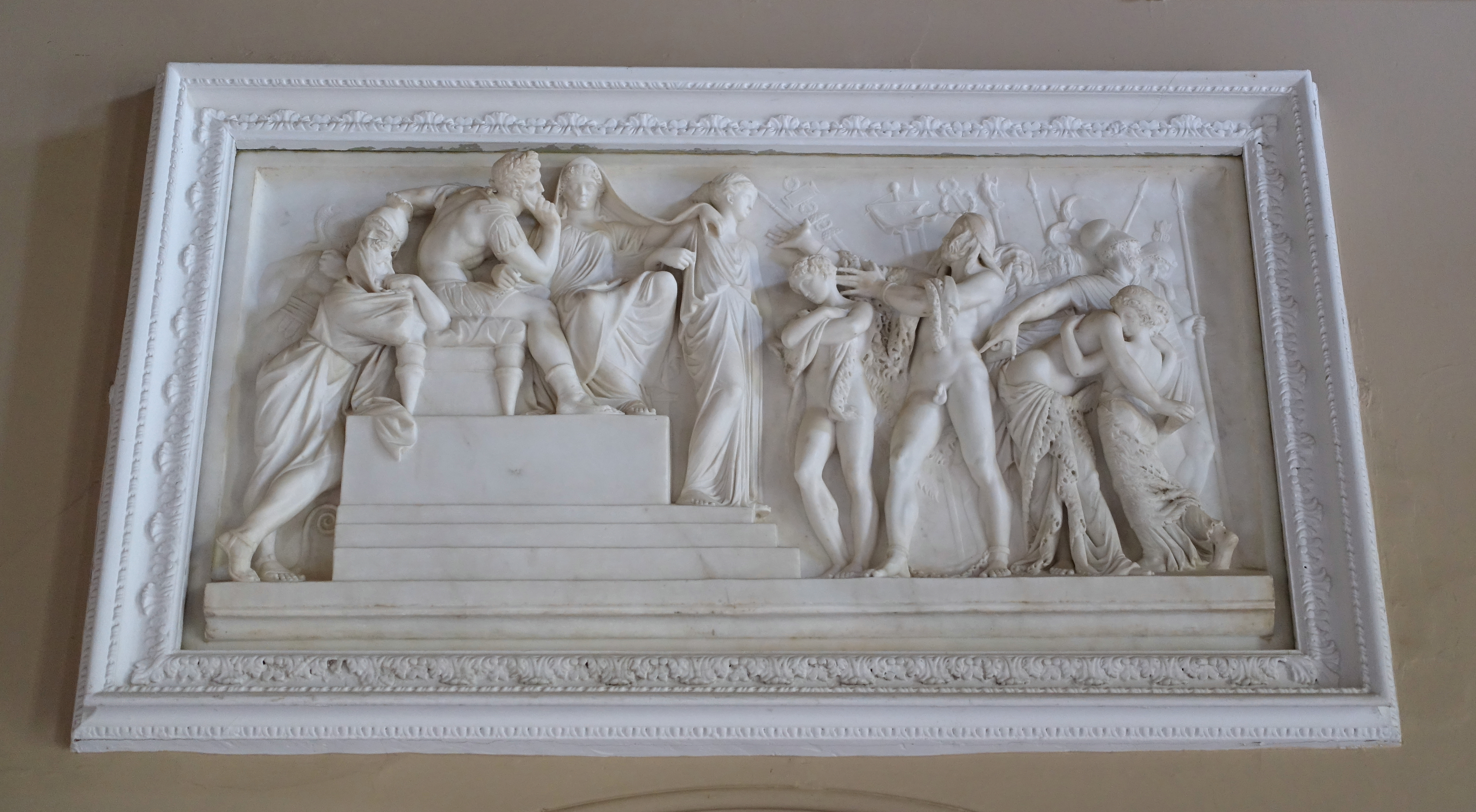
Caractacus Pleading Before the Emperor Claudius, The North Hall

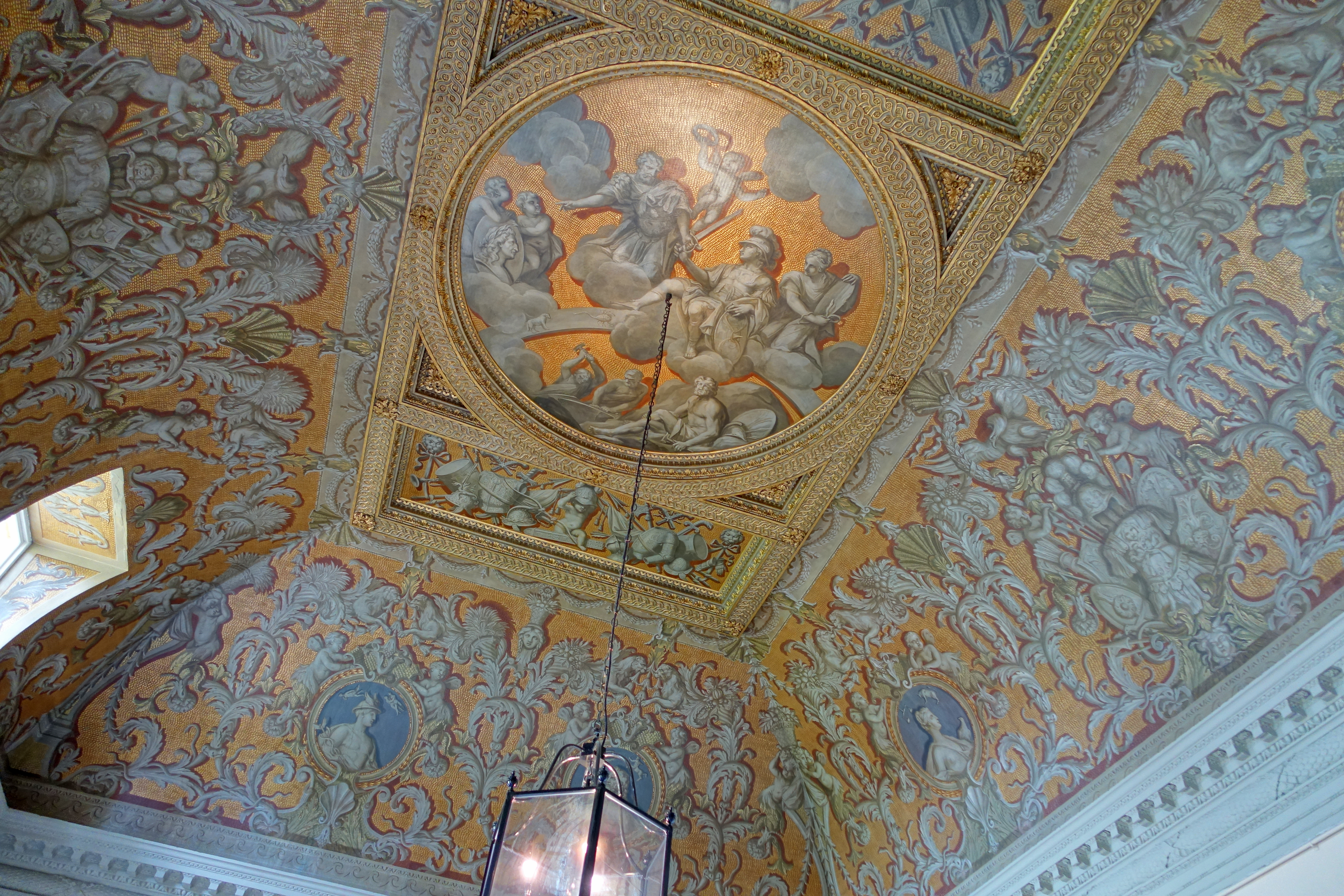
The Ceiling, The North Hall

==== The North Hall ====
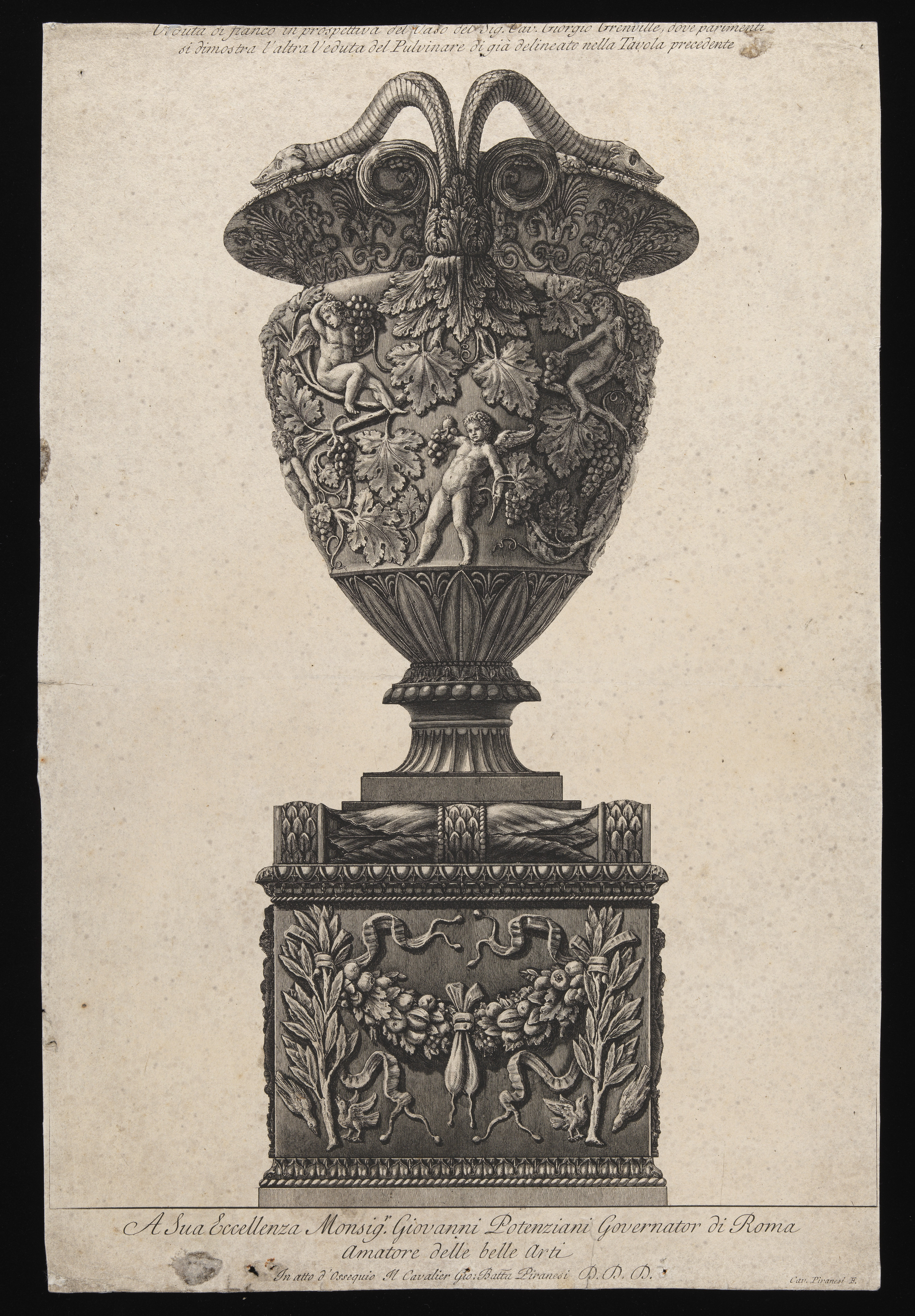
One of the Piranesi vases sold in 1848

Located behind the north portico, this is the main Entrance Hall of the house and the least changed of the rooms dating from the 1730s. The ceiling has a deep cove, and was painted, from about 1730 onwards, by William Kent in grisaille on a gold background imitating mosaic. There are six classical deities depicted in the cove, Mercury, Jupiter, Venus, Saturn, Apollo and Diana. There are also nine of the signs of the zodiac. The flat centre of the ceiling is enclosed in a plaster beam, which in turn encloses a square with a circle within which encloses a painting of Mars. The south wall has in its centre a large set of doors which lead into The Marble Saloon, either side of these doors are portraits by Sir William Beechey of on left Richard, first Duke of Buckingham & Chandos on the right Anna Eliza, First Duchess of Buckingham & Chandos she is depicted with her son later the 2nd Duke. The west wall has above the fireplace Thomas Banks's white marble relief of Caractacus Pleading Before the Emperor Claudius in Rome in its centre which is flanked by two doors. The east wall has above a small staircase leading to the ground floor, Christophe Veyrier's white marble relief of The family of Darius before Alexander the Great in its centre flanked by two doors. Works of art sold in 1848 that used to be in this room include Anthony van Dyck's portrait of the Marquess of Vienville, and among other sculpture two marble vases bought as Ancient Roman but actually the work of Giovanni Battista Piranesi, one of these is now in the Los Angeles County Museum of Art.

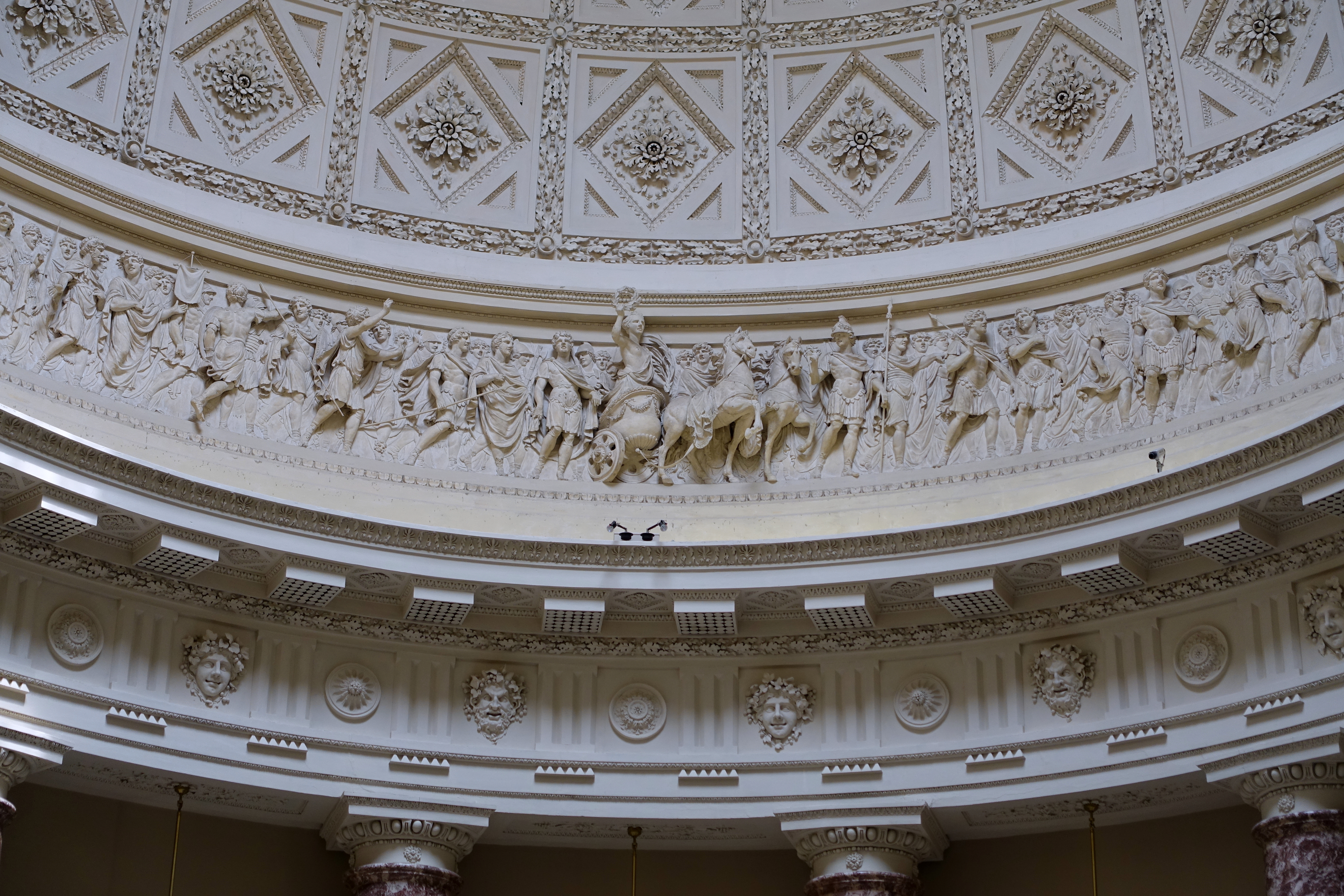
The frieze, The Marble Saloon

==== The Marble Saloon ====
This is the grandest interior in the House, located immediately behind the south portico. It is based on the Pantheon in Rome. It is elliptical in plan, 63 by 45 feet (19 by 14 m); the domed ceiling is over 56 feet (17 m) high. The room was probably designed by Vincenzo Valdrè, the basic structure was built between 1775 and 1777 but decoration was probably only complete by 1788 at a cost of £12,000. The lower half of the walls are surrounded by 16 unfluted Roman Doric columns made from red scagliola with white veins that mimics Sicilian Jasper (the work of Domenico Bartoli) and with white marble capitals and bases, supporting a richly detailed Doric entablature of white plaster with satyrs on the metopes. Hanging from the soffit of the entablature between each pair of columns are replica brass lanterns with glass domes, these are copies of the original light fittings. These columns flank four doors on the cardinal directions, the rest flank plain niches that once contained eight Ancient Roman statues. These were sold in 1848, recently new plaster casts of eight statues from the Berlin State Museums were added to the niches flanking each door and were unveiled in September 2009. Added at the same time to the niches between each pair of statues were fibreglass copies of the original gilded Athéniennes (or Torchieres), the originals were made of timber and painted and gilded to resemble metal. Above the niches and doorways are white plaster rectangular reliefs depicting arms and trophies. Above the entablature is the very elaborate frieze, this consists of over 280 human and 14 animals in plaster all alto-relievo, the sculptor was probably Charles Peart. The subject of the frieze is the suovetaurilia. The dome is coffered of white plaster, there are 160 coffers nearly all of unique shape. The coffers contain highly decorated rosettes, and the ribs in between are also very elaborately decorated. There is a central skylight also elliptical. The floor is made of 72 four-foot-square slabs of white Carrara marble resting on a brick vault; in the centre of the floor is a metal grille, part of the heating system. This is the first room to be fully restored to its pre-1848 condition.

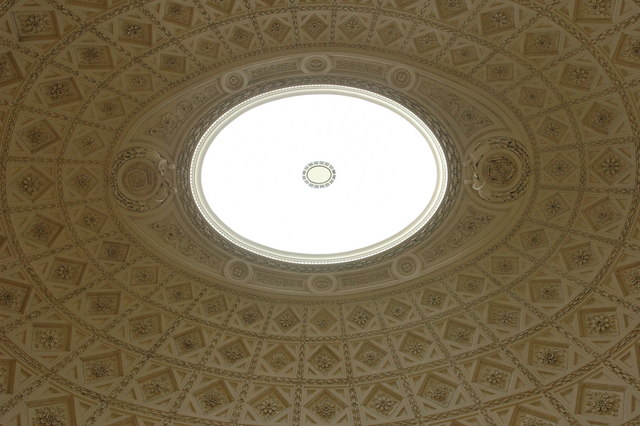
The dome of The Marble Saloon

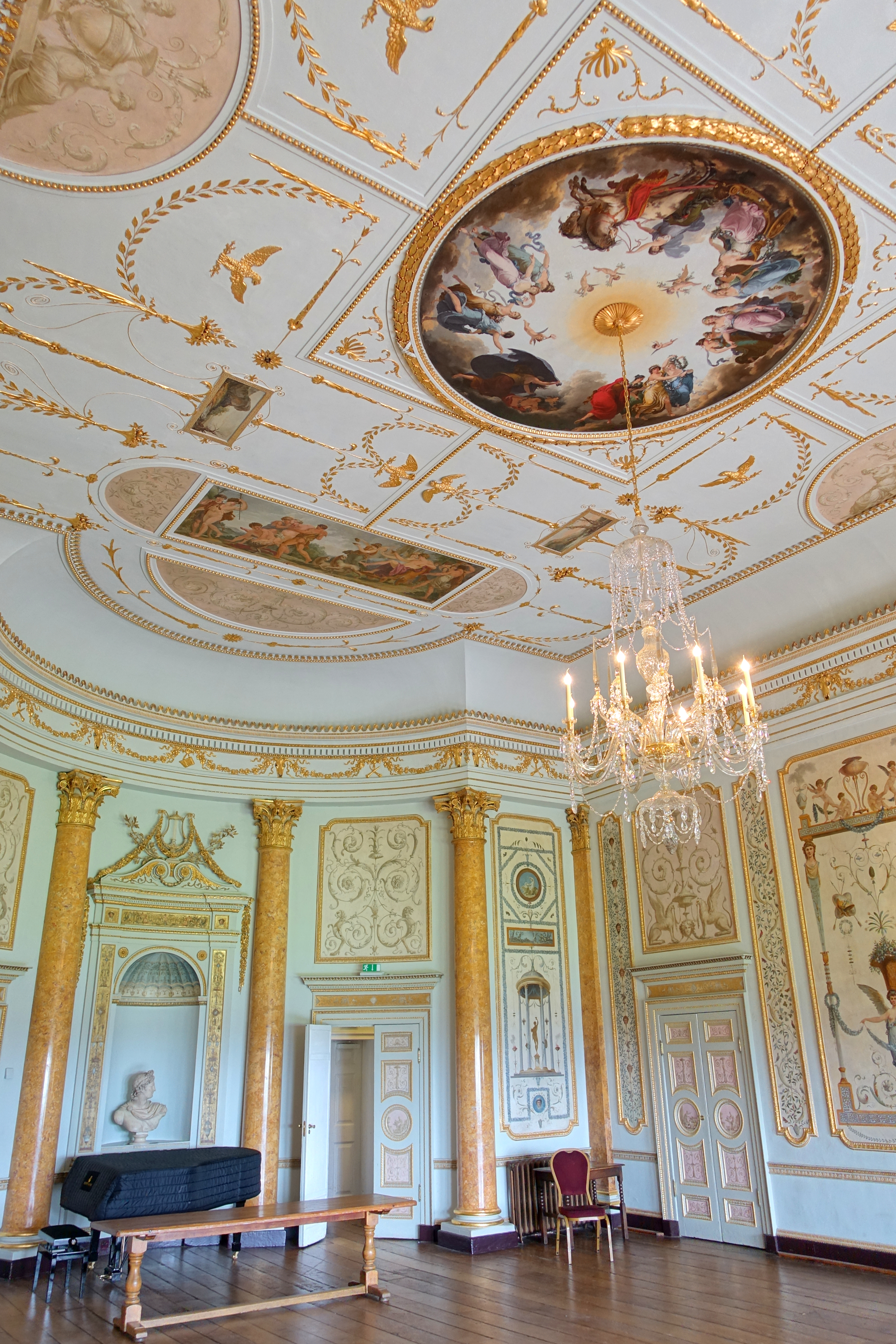
The Music Room

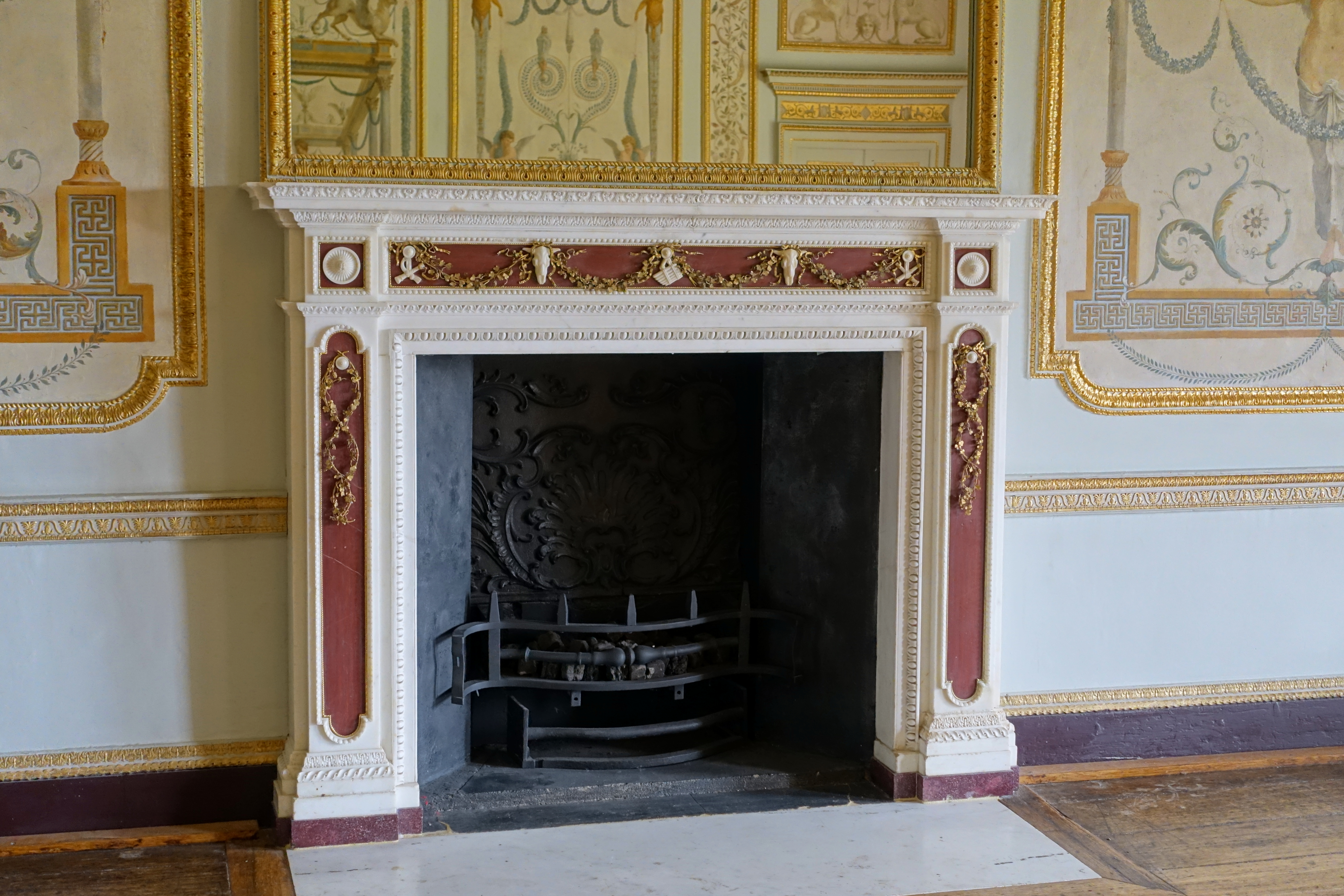
The Music Room fireplace

==== The State Music Room ====
The State Music Room, to the east of The Marble Saloon, is approximately 30 by 40 feet (12 m), probably designed by Valdrè and finished in the early 1780s. With an apse in the centre of the north wall, there are doors at each end of the side walls, though only the northern pair are real, the other two are false doors. The north has within the apse two sets of doors flanking a niche that is surrounded by a decorative frame. There are two un-fluted scagliola Corinthian columns on the corners of the apse and also within it flanking the niche. The walls are painted with panels in the form of Grotesques and Arabesques. The chimneypiece in the centre of the east wall is of white marble inset with panels of Rosso antico marble and with carved decoration of musical instruments in white marble and ormolu. This chimneypiece was sold in 1922 but bought back in 1991, and a new mirror above the chimneypiece was made to replace the original one. The plaster ceiling has gilt moulded decoration and seven inset paintings. The central painting is circular and is of The Dance of the Hours after Guido Reni, and is flanked to the north and south by two rectangular paintings of the four seasons. Between these large paintings are four smaller ones of landscape scenes. All the paintings are believed to be by Valdrè. The central chandelier is a recreation of 2012 of the one sold in 1848. The ancient Roman sculpture the Marine Venus, that used to stand in the niche, was purchased by Queen Victoria at the 1848 sale and is now at Osborne House. This has been replaced in the niche by a bust of William Pitt the Elder by Joseph Wilton, which is on loan to the house. There is mention of a chamber organ in the room in 1779. Also sold in 1848 were two Italian neo-classical side tables with Verd antique tops, the frames being carved with plaques of Leda and the Swan and Juno and her peacock; these are both now in the Wallace Collection.

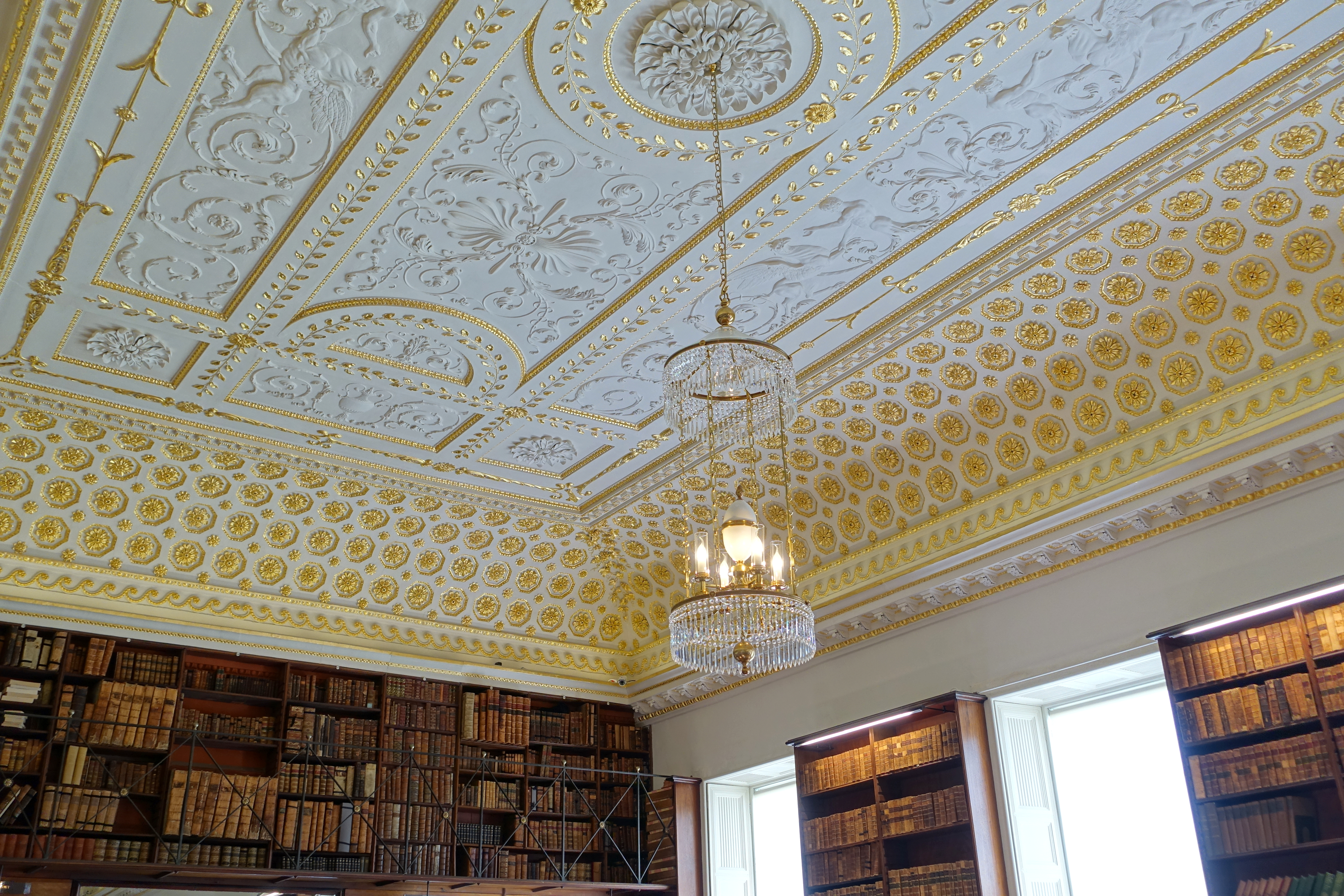
The Library Ceiling

==== The Large Library ====
The Large Library is one of the three libraries in the house, is 75 by 25 feet (22.9 by 7.6 m), it is located to the east of The State Music Room. This room was created in 1793 from the former East Gallery. The plaster ceiling dates from then, with its elaborate cornice supporting a deep coffered cove in each corner of which are clusters of grapes, the flat centre of the ceiling has elaborate decoration, including in the border of the central panel mermen holding and feeding a griffin. The main entrance is in the centre of the long north wall. There are chimneypieces in the centre of each end wall. These are of white marble with flanking caryatids; the jambs are of black marble, one dates from 1792 which is a copy of the other probably dating from the 1760s. Above each chimneypiece is a mirror. The bookcases are of mahogany there are over five hundred shelves on the lower walls and they have their original doors with brass wire grilles. The walls are completely covered by the shelving, and even the walls between the seven windows of the south wall. The upper two hundred and forty shelves are accessed via a gallery running around the east, north and west walls. The over 20,000 volumes that were on these shelves, largely collected by the 1st Marquess of Buckingham were sold in January 1849, at Sotheby's; the sale lasted 24 days. There is a series of three marble busts in the windows that were sold from the house in 1921 but have been repurchased. These are: 1st Duke of Buckingham and Chandos by Raimondo Trentanove, Frederick III, German Emperor and Victoria, Princess Royal both carved by Tito Angelini. Also there are small busts above the bookcases on the window wall, Homer, Francis Bacon, Isaac Newton, Horace, Demosthenes and another of Homer. These were sold in 1921 but donated to the House and returned to their original positions.

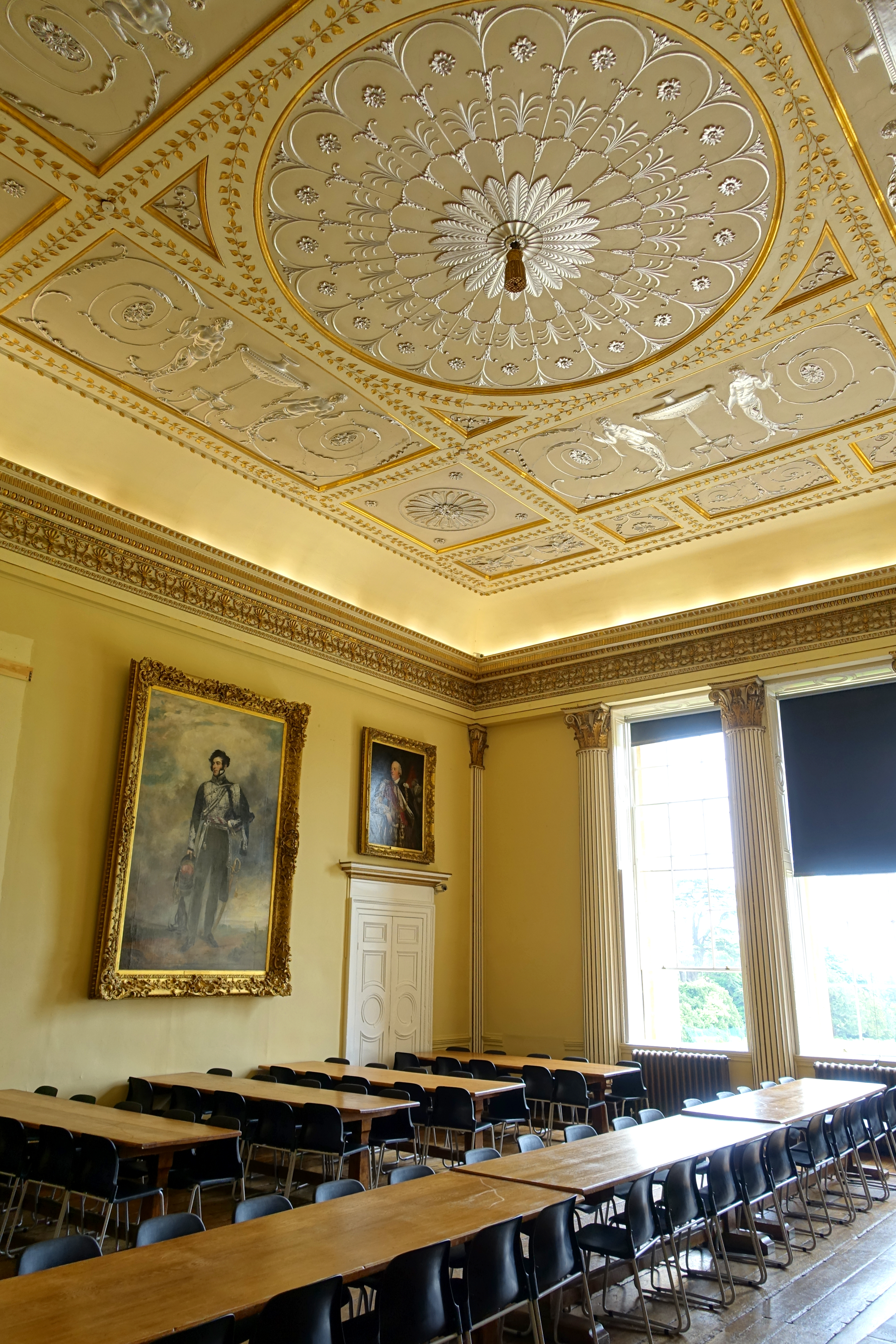
The State Drawing Room

==== The State Drawing Room ====
Also called The Temple Room, the State Drawing Room is to the west of The Marble Saloon and measures approximately 30 by 40 feet (12 m), with an apse in the centre of the north wall. There are doors at each end of the side walls, though only the northern pair are real, and the other two are false doors. The plaster ceiling is probably a design of Valdrè. Decorated in neo-classical style with a symmetrical arrangement of nereids, tazzas, paterae and other motifs, originally the details were gilt but this was replaced by silver in a 1965 restoration. The ceiling dates from 1776 and was executed by James Lovell. The original marble fireplace dated 1777 was sold in 1922 and is now in Spain at the headquarters of Grupo Santander; it contains an antique alabaster bas-relief from Egypt of a Sacrifice to Bacchus. The north wall has an engaged fluted Corinthian columns of wood flanking the apse and a further two within it. There are quarter columns in the corners of the room. The walls used to be hung with red Damask and the finest paintings in the collection hung on the walls. There were in 1838 fifty-two paintings hanging on the walls, including: Helena Fourment by Rubens. She was his second wife, now in the Barber Institute; The Exposition of Moses by Nicolas Poussin now in the Ashmolean Museum; The Finding of Moses by Salvator Rosa now in the Detroit Institute of Arts; Assumption of the Virgin by Bartolomé Esteban Murillo now in the Wallace Collection; Philip Baptising the Eunuch by Aelbert Cuyp now at Anglesey Abbey; View of a Village by David Teniers the Younger now in the National Gallery and The Persian Sybil by Domenichino now in the Wallace Collection; several of these works were acquired at the sale of the Orleans Collection. Also the finest pieces of Sèvres porcelain of the over 200 in the collection used to be displayed in this room, but these were sold in 1848. The furnishings included several pieces from the Doge's Palace which are now in other British collections. They include a hexagonal side table, the top inlaid with various marbles and now in the Wallace Collection, and two gilt gesso side tables. One is in the V&A, the other at Sudeley Castle.

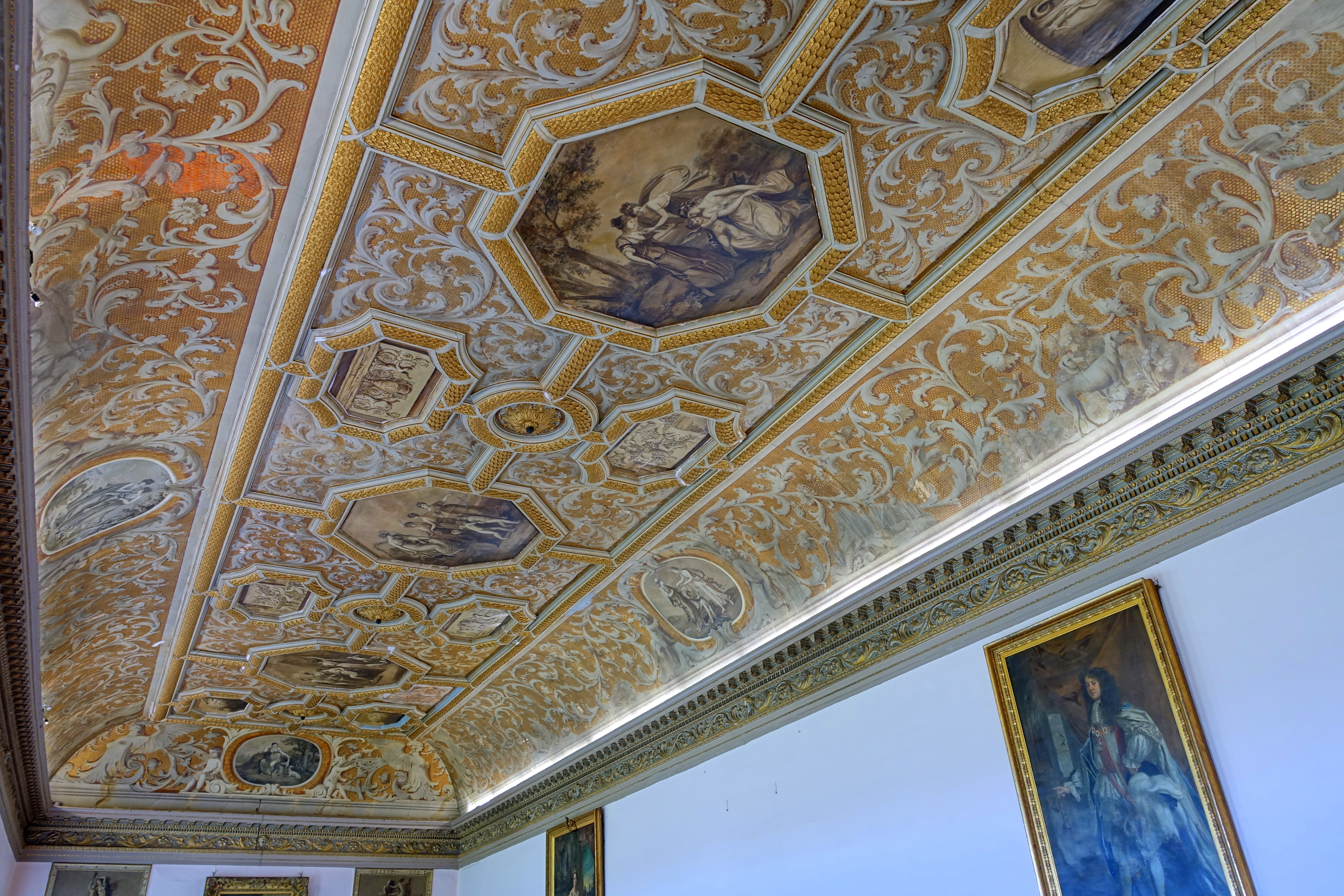
The Ceiling, State Dining Room

==== The State Dining Room ====
The State Dining Room measures 75 by 25 feet (22.9 by 7.6 m). Located to the west of The State Drawing Room, created in the 1740s the probable architect being either Henry Flitcroft or 'Capability' Brown. The Stowe House Preservation Trust are currently fundraising to restore this room to its former magnificence. This was The State Gallery until 1817 when it assumed its current name. The ceiling has an elaborate plaster entablature supporting a deep cove, this has painted decoration dated 1747 by Francesco Sleter, including Hebe feeding Jupiter's Eagle east, Cupid playing with two Graces north, Cupid asleep with two Graces south and Diana and her Hounds west, the spaces between these paintings are decorated with animals including swans and their cygnets, pigeons and rabbits. There are three large octagonal paintings on the central flat of the ceiling. These are probably early 19th-century replacements for the original by Robert Jones. They are Venus disarming Cupid east, Venus on her Chariot, crowned by Cupid and attended by the Three Graces centre and Venus at her Toilet, attended by the Graces west. There are also eight smaller octagonal panels depicting pairs of vases and classical reliefs. The areas between these paintings are decorated with painted acanthus and all the paintings are bordered by white and gilt plaster beams decorated in guilloché. The two chimneypieces on the north wall date from the 1920s the original pair were sold in 1922 and are now at Benham Park, these were of white and yellow Siena marbles, with elaborately carved wooded overmantels that contained paintings now in America, these are Goddess conducting Learning east and Mercury conducting Tragedy and Comedy to Parnassus. There are four paintings above the two doors in the west and east walls of male and female centaurs with Bacchic emblems and lyres, probably painted by Robert Jones. The walls used to be hung with five Brussels tapestries commissioned by Viscount Cobham from O. Leyneir, they depict the triumph of classical deities: Ceres, Bacchus, Neptune, Mars and Diana, sold in 1921 they are now in Switzerland. The dining table when fully extended was 65 feet (20 m) long. The walls are hung with various portraits of people associated with the house and family that have been acquired over the years, these are, on the east wall Caroline Harvey wife of the 3rd Duke by Sir Francis Grant, donated by the granddaughter of the sitter, Mrs. Thomas Close-Smith (1886–1972) on her death in 1972; above the eastern fireplace Queen Caroline of Ansbach from the studio of Sir Godfrey Kneller; in the centre of the north wall Lady Christian Lyttelton the sister of Viscount Cobham, a copy of a portrait by Kneller; over the western fireplace King George II from the studio of Sir Godfrey Kneller; and on the west wall A Lady in Eastern Costume on a Terrace with a Peacock possibly Lady Hester Stanhope by James Northcote, she was the great-granddaughter of Sir Richard Temple 3rd Baronet.

==== The Small Tapestry Dining Room ====
Also known as The Snug, the Small Tapestry Dining Room is located to the west of The State Dining Room, originally dating from the late 1750s, but having undergone drastic reconstruction little of the original decoration survives. Only the gilt cornice and plaster frieze, and the frames that enclosed the tapestries are still in place. The elaborate marble chimneypiece and its carved-wooden overmantel, which contained an oval portrait of Lord Cobham dressed in armour by Sir Godfrey Kneller, were sold in 1922. The four tapestries sold in 1921 were from Brussels and depicted the Arts of War and were designed by Lambert de Hondt the Younger. The largest tapestry depicted the Battle of Wijnendale and included a depiction of Lord Cobham who was one of John Churchill, 1st Duke of Marlborough's generals at the battle. The ceiling was destroyed in 1935 when the western pavilion of the south front was reconstructed due to structural problems.

==== The Garter Room ====
Also known as "The Servery", the Garter Room, which served as the State Bedroom, is to the west of The Small Tapestry Dining Room. Designed by Borra in 1755 and completed over the next five years. None of the original decoration survived the reconstruction of the west pavilion in 1935. There is a reconstruction of the original plaster ceiling with its Garter insignia in the centre. The most important painting in the room, that used to hang on the east wall, was Joshua Reynolds's Marquess of Granby, now in the collection of the National Army Museum, Earl Temple's nephew Richard Grenville was the Marquess's Aide-de-camp during the Seven Years' War. The magnificent state bed which was set up in the room in 1759–1760 and was nearly 15 feet (4.6 m) in height, survives in the Lady Lever Art Gallery. It used to be in the recess on the west wall. The bed was moved to the Rembrandt Room for Queen Victoria's visit. The two elaborately carved and gilt robe chests, one of "gopher wood" [sic], the other of sandalwood, that used to stand on the north wall flanking the white marble fireplace are now in the Wallace Collection. The room takes up the space behind the two western tripartite windows of the South Front, the corners of the room prior to 1935 contained separate closets. The south-western closet was called the Japan Closet and was decorated in a Japanese style, this used to contain the Chandos Jewels finally sold for nearly £10,000 by Lady Kinloss in 1929, also the room used to have a staircase to the dressing room on the floor above. The south-eastern closet was called the Shakespeare Closet because it contained the Chandos portrait of William Shakespeare now in the National Portrait Gallery, London, also from this room and now in the National Gallery, London, are two paintings, a portrait of Martin Luther which used to be ascribed to Hans Holbein the Younger and Francesco Raibolini's portrait of Bartolomeo Bianchini. The north-east closet was a water-closet. In the niches in the walls that flank the recess between the two southern closets used to be displayed a collection 120 pieces of Maiolica. One of the finest pieces a dish painted with St. Thomas touching Christ's wound from Deruta is now in the Courtauld Institute of Art.

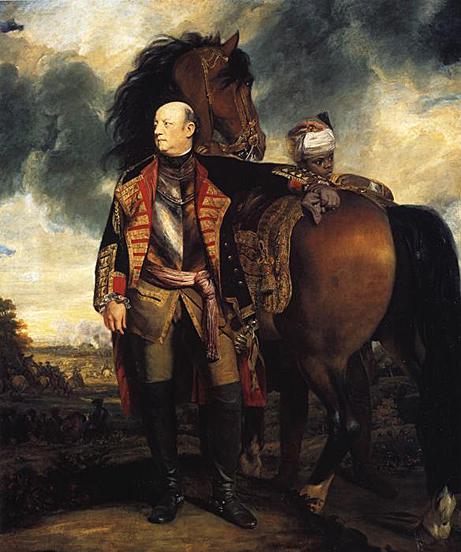
The Marquess of Granby, Joshua Reynolds, now in the National Army Museum

William Shakespeare, the Chandos portrait. now in the National Portrait Gallery, London, London

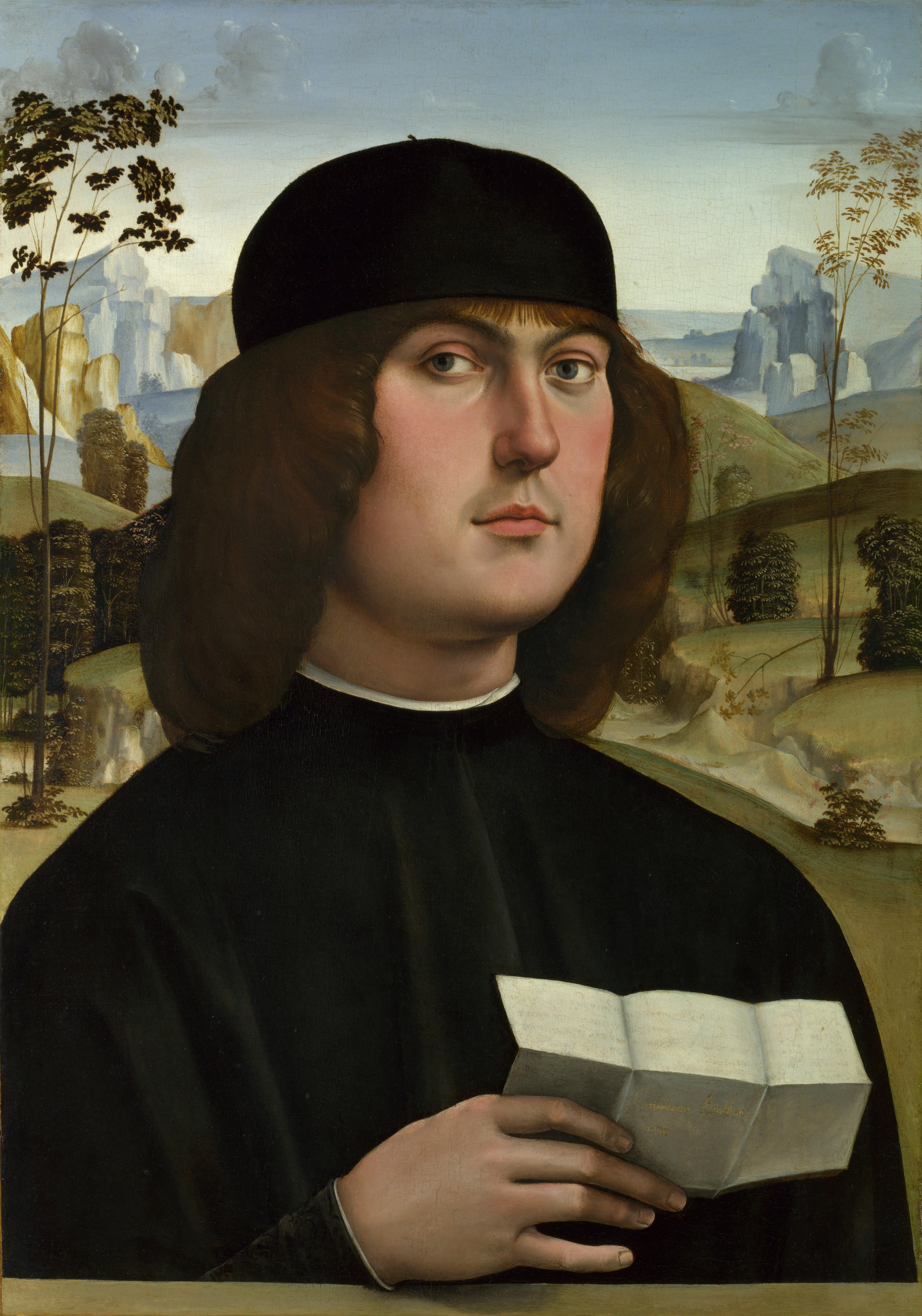
Bartolomeo Bianchini, Francesco Raibolini, now in the National Gallery

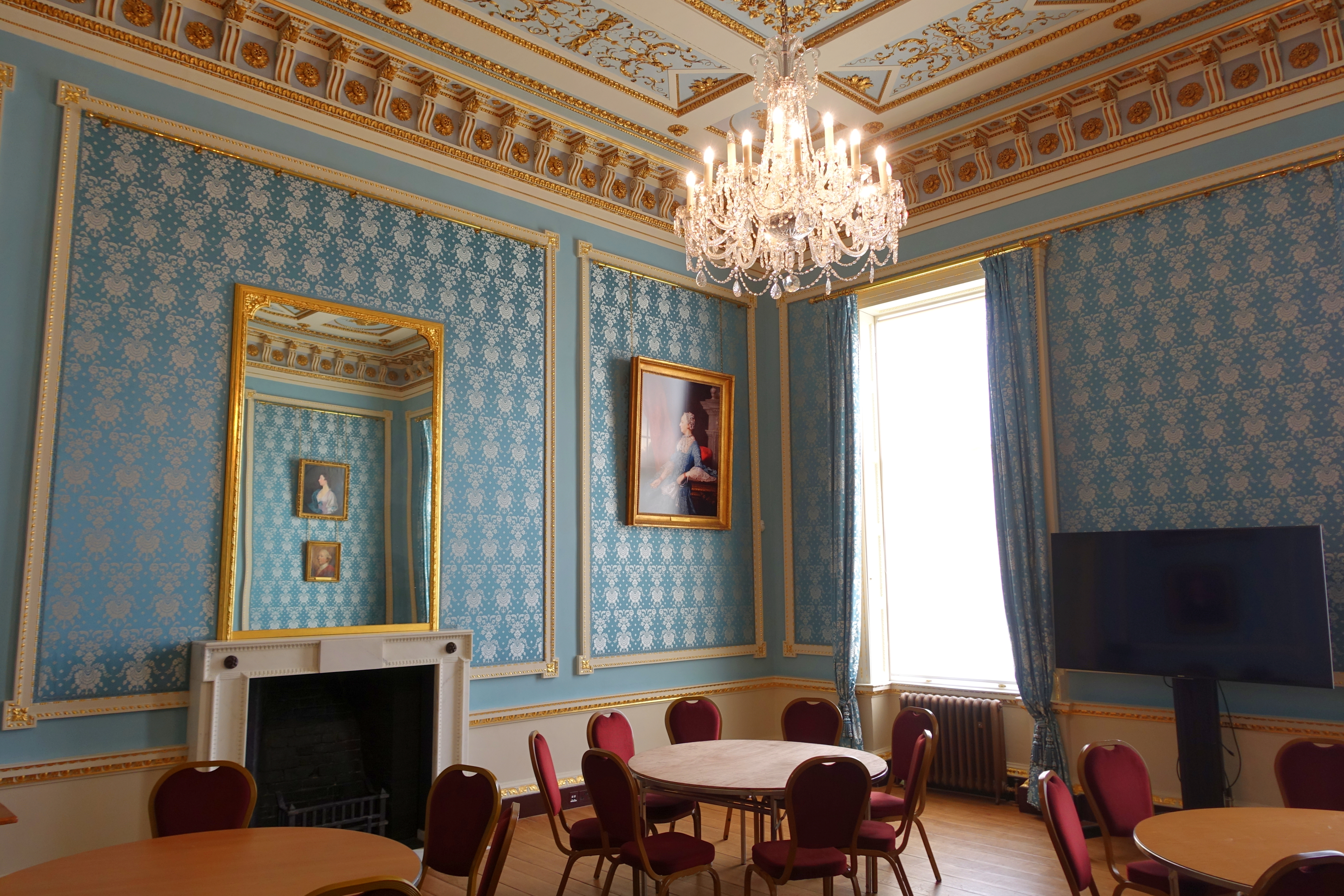
The Blue Room

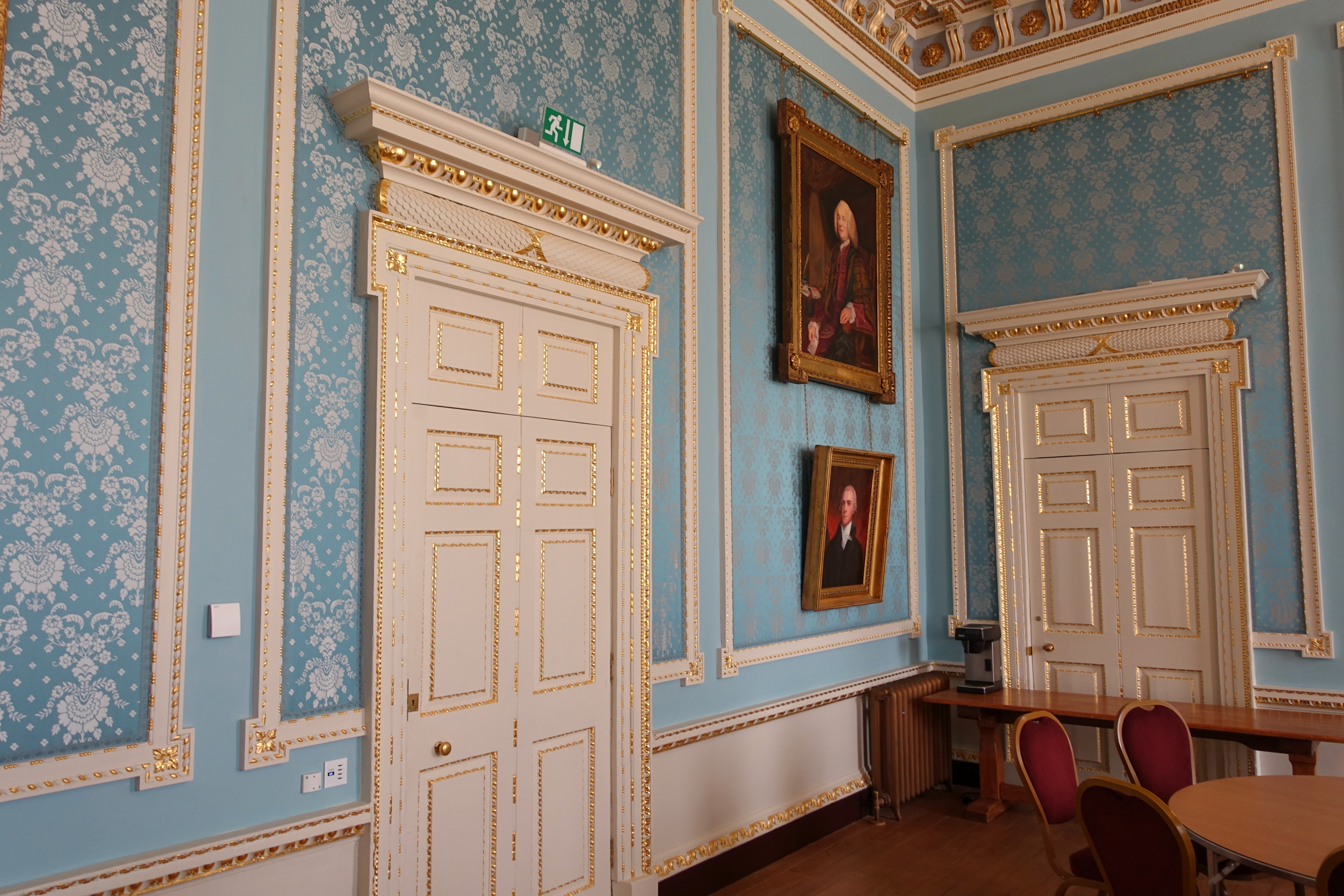
The Blue Room

==== The Blue Room ====
The Blue Room is to the east of the Large Library, used as a small drawing room. Until the 1849 sale this was known as the Print Room and the walls were lined with bookshelves similar to those in the Large Library. These housed the extensive print collection. Over 55,000 prints were sold in 1834 at Phillips auction house, but raised only £6,700. The remaining English prints were sold in March 1849 at Sotheby's for £3,800. After this sale the bookshelves were removed and replaced with panels of blue silk with matching curtains, (these were sold off in 1922), and the room assumed its present name. The plaster ceiling dated between 1774 and 1775 is decorated with emblems of Bacchus, including four thyrsi surrounding an ornate jug with a handle in the form of a satyr. Encircled by a wreath of vine-leaves and grapes. The four corners have relieves of Venus, Flora, Vulcan and Venus, the crystal chandelier is modern replacement for the original one as is the fireplace. Displayed in the room are several pieces of the 'Stowe Service' commissioned from the Worcester Porcelain Factory in 1813 by the 1st Duke while he was still a Marquess. The service was sold in two batches, 206 pieces in 1848, and the remaining 164 pieces in 1921. But as pieces have appeared on the market they have been repurchased. Also on display in the room are several family portraits that have also been bought as they have come on the market, they are The Marquess of Buckingham painted in his Garter robes by John Jackson; William Pitt the Elder by William Hoare; William Pitt the Younger by John Hoppner; a copy of Anne Chambers, Countess Temple by Allan Ramsey; Sir Peter Temple, Second Baronet by Cornelius Johnson; Sir Richard Temple, Third Baronet attributed to Henri Gascar; a photographic copy of Earl Temple by Allan Ramsey the original is in the National Gallery of Victoria; Alice Anne, Duchess of Buckingham by Sir Arthur Stockdale Cope; Viscount Cobham by Jean-Baptiste van Loo; The Third Duke of Buckingham and Chandos an engraving of the portrait by C.A. Tompkins & a possible portrait of Earl Temple by Robert Edge Pine. Also in the room are two of the original Athéniennes from the Marble Saloon.

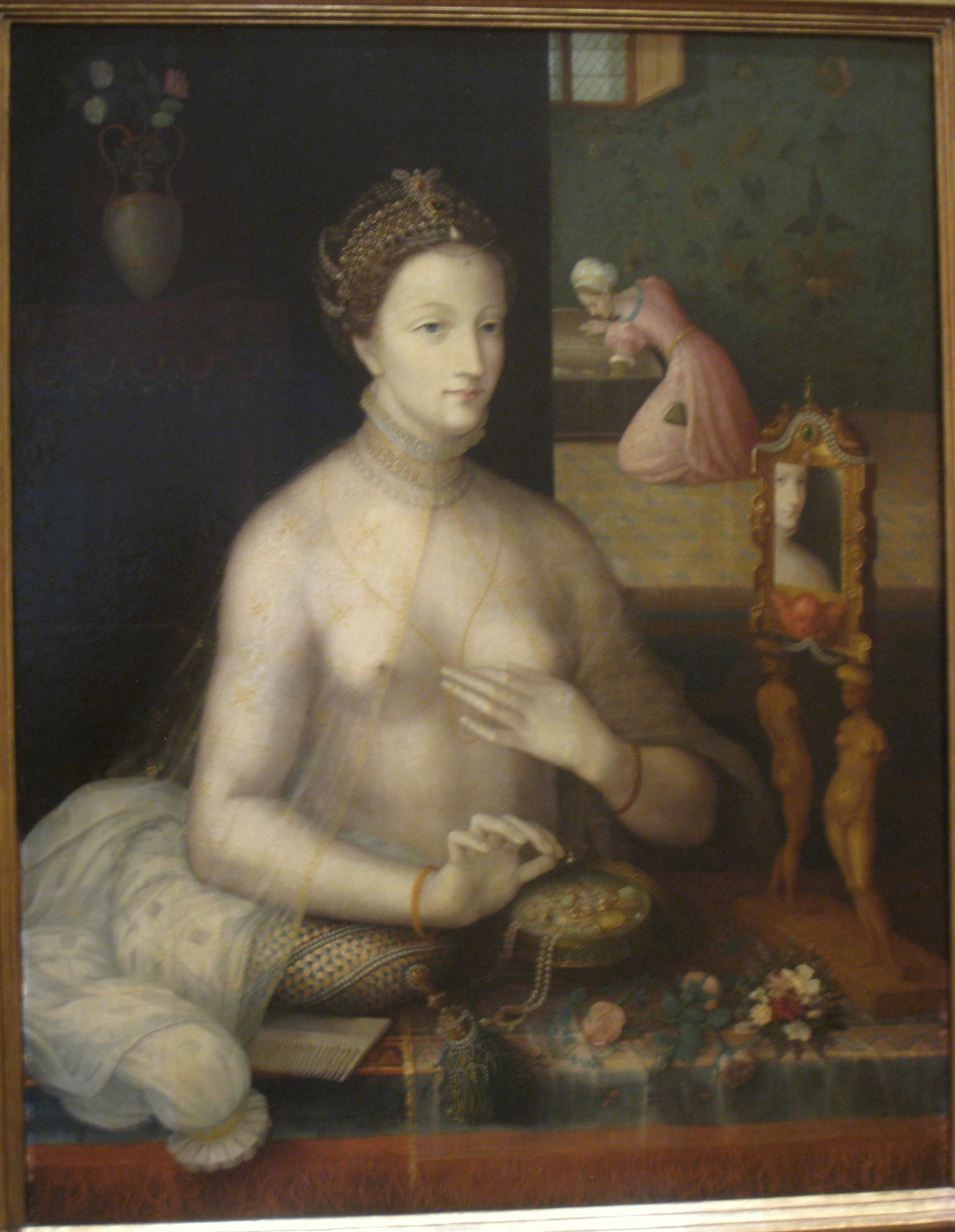
Woman at her Toilette School of Fontainebleau, now in the Worcester Art Museum, Massachusetts

==== The Breakfast Parlour ====
Now called the Chandos Sigma Dormitory. It is immediately to the east of the Blue Room dating from 1773 to 1775. This is a relatively plain room. The ceiling is coved, centre of the ceiling is decorated with a circular painting of Venus blindfolding Cupid surrounded by plaster decoration that includes incense burners. The marble fireplace dated 1774 with its relief of Venus and Cupid was sold in 1922. There used to be 39 paintings in this room, including Virgin and Child with SS John the Baptist and Catherine, dated 1504 by Andrea Previtali this is now in the National Gallery, London and Woman at her Toilette once attributed to Leonardo da Vinci and bought as such in 1780, now School of Fontainebleau, this is in the Worcester Art Museum, Massachusetts.

==== The Rembrandt Room ====
Now called the Chandos Delta Dormitory. Immediately to the east of the Breakfast Parlour, originally dated 1748, the room was extended and redecorated in 1775. In a relatively plain room, the painting that used to be in the centre of the ceiling, Venus at her toilet by Vincenzo Valdrè was sold in 1922 along with the marble chimneypiece with its central relief of Hebe and Jupiter's Eagle. The room once contained eleven paintings attributed to Rembrandt although only three are considered so now, the rest being School of Rembrandt. All the paintings were sold in 1848. They included: Samson Threatening his Father-in-law, in 1989 this was sold by the estate of the late Walter P. Chrysler Jr.; Bellona now in the Metropolitan Museum of Art; Self-Portrait as a Young man now in the Isabella Stewart Gardner Museum; The Preacher Eleazar Swalmius now in the Royal Museum of Fine Arts, Antwerp; A Young Archer and (genuine Rembrandt) The Centurion Cornelius sold for £2,300 (the highest price any of the paintings sold in 1848 fetched) both now in the Wallace Collection. Also originally in this room and now in the Wallace Collection are the almost 10 feet (3.0 m) high astronomical regulator clock by Michael Stollewerck formerly at the Palace of Versailles and a Boulle armoire. Also from this room was a German marquetry cabinet, later bought by Mayer Amschel de Rothschild for Mentmore Towers. It was in this room that Queen Victoria and her husband slept during their visit, redecorated for the occasion, including the purchase of the largest Persian carpet in the country, 25.5 by 16 feet (4.9 m), this cost £200, but only fetched £55 in the 1848 sale. The 2nd Duke spent £5,300 on redecorating the house and on entertaining the royal couple for a visit that lasted a few days.

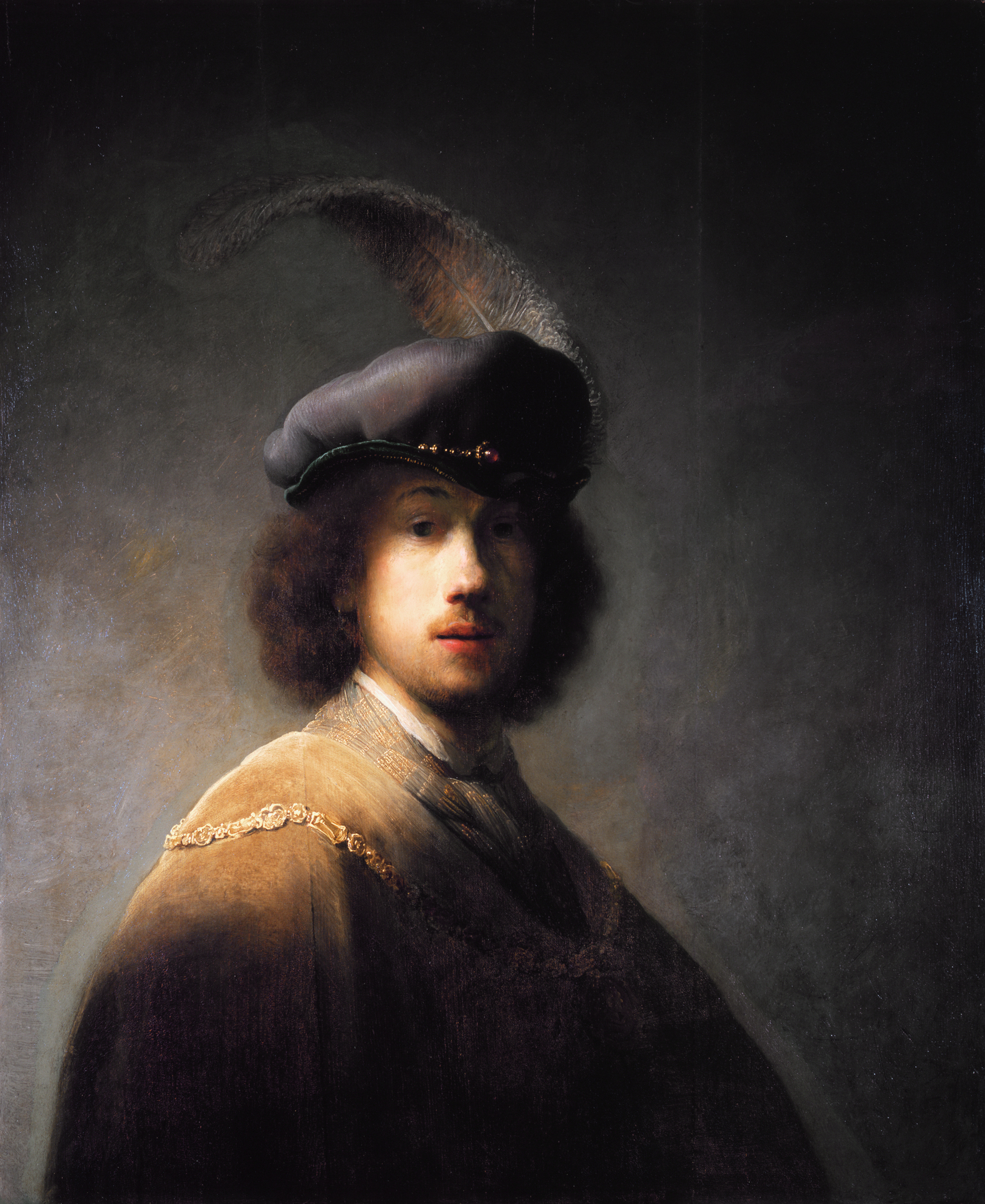
Rembrandt van Rijn, Self portrait, now in the Isabella Stewart Gardner Museum

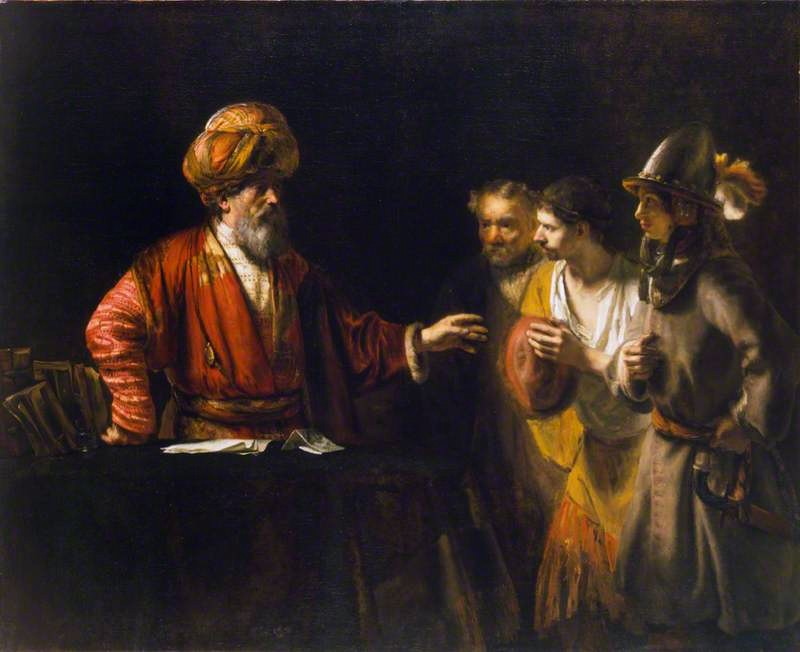
Rembrandt van Rijn, The Centurion Cornelius, now in the Wallace Collection

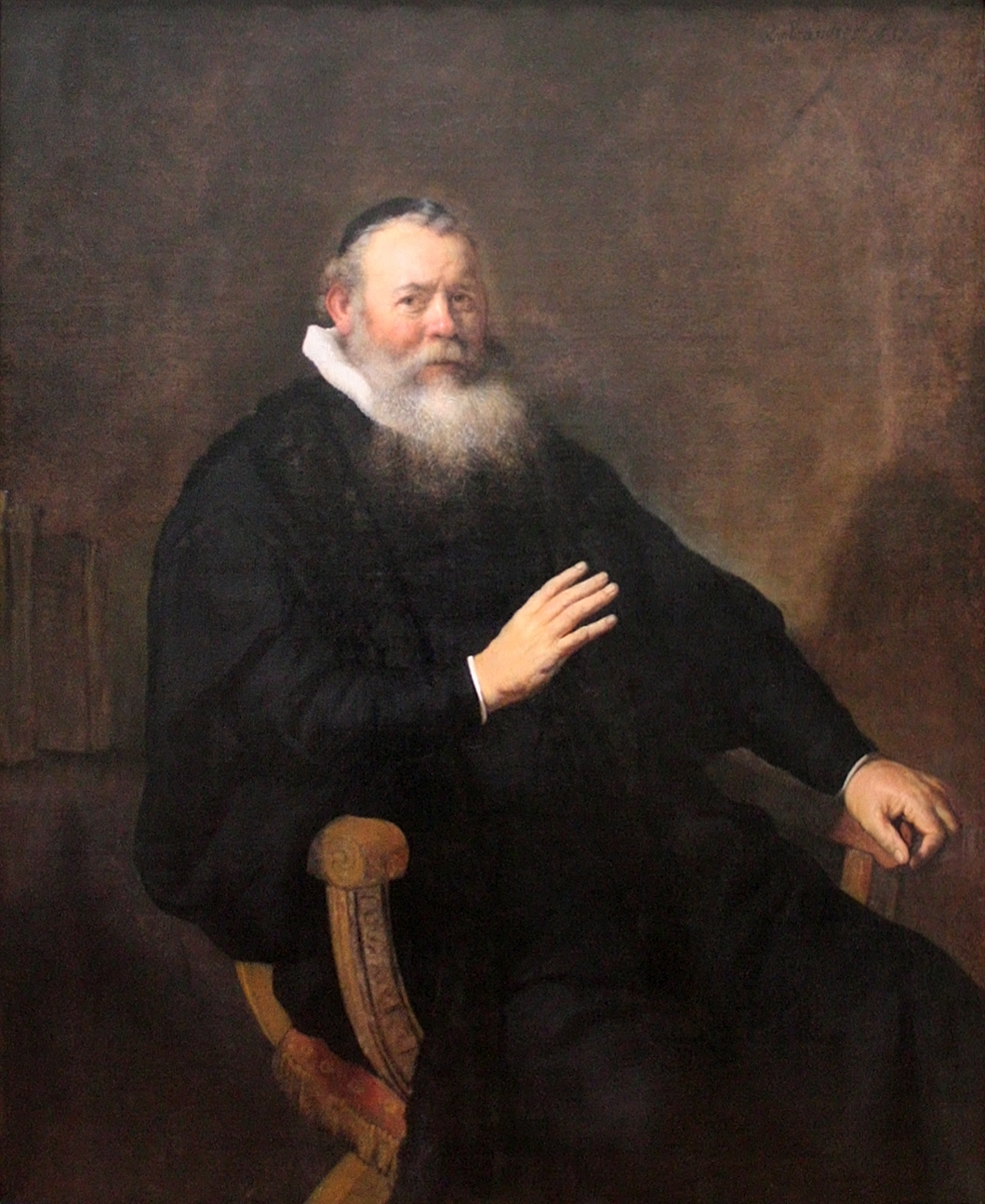
Rembrandt van Rijn, The Preacher Eleazar Swalmius, now in the Royal Museum of Fine Arts Antwerp

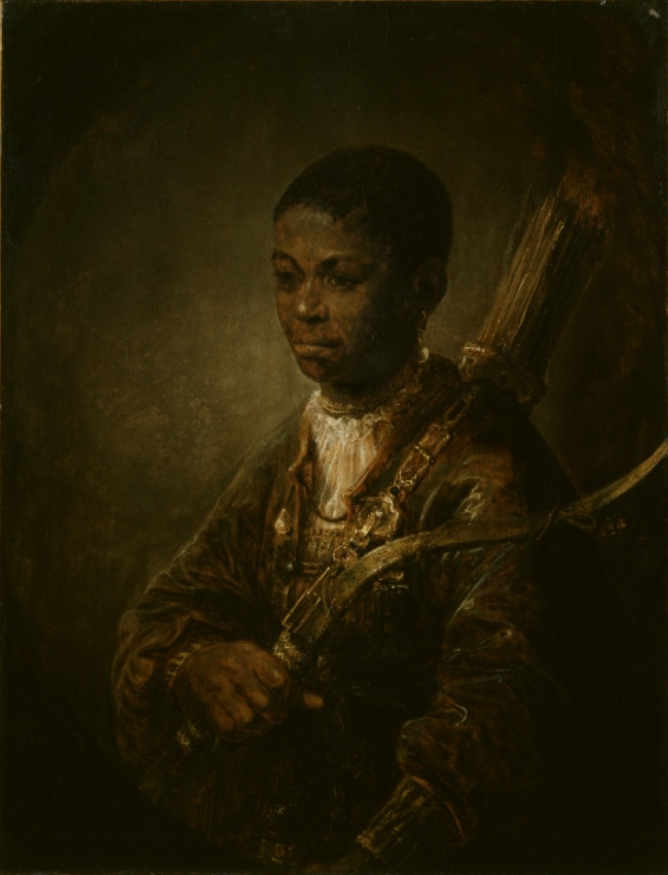
Govaert Flinck, A Young Archer, now in the Wallace Collection

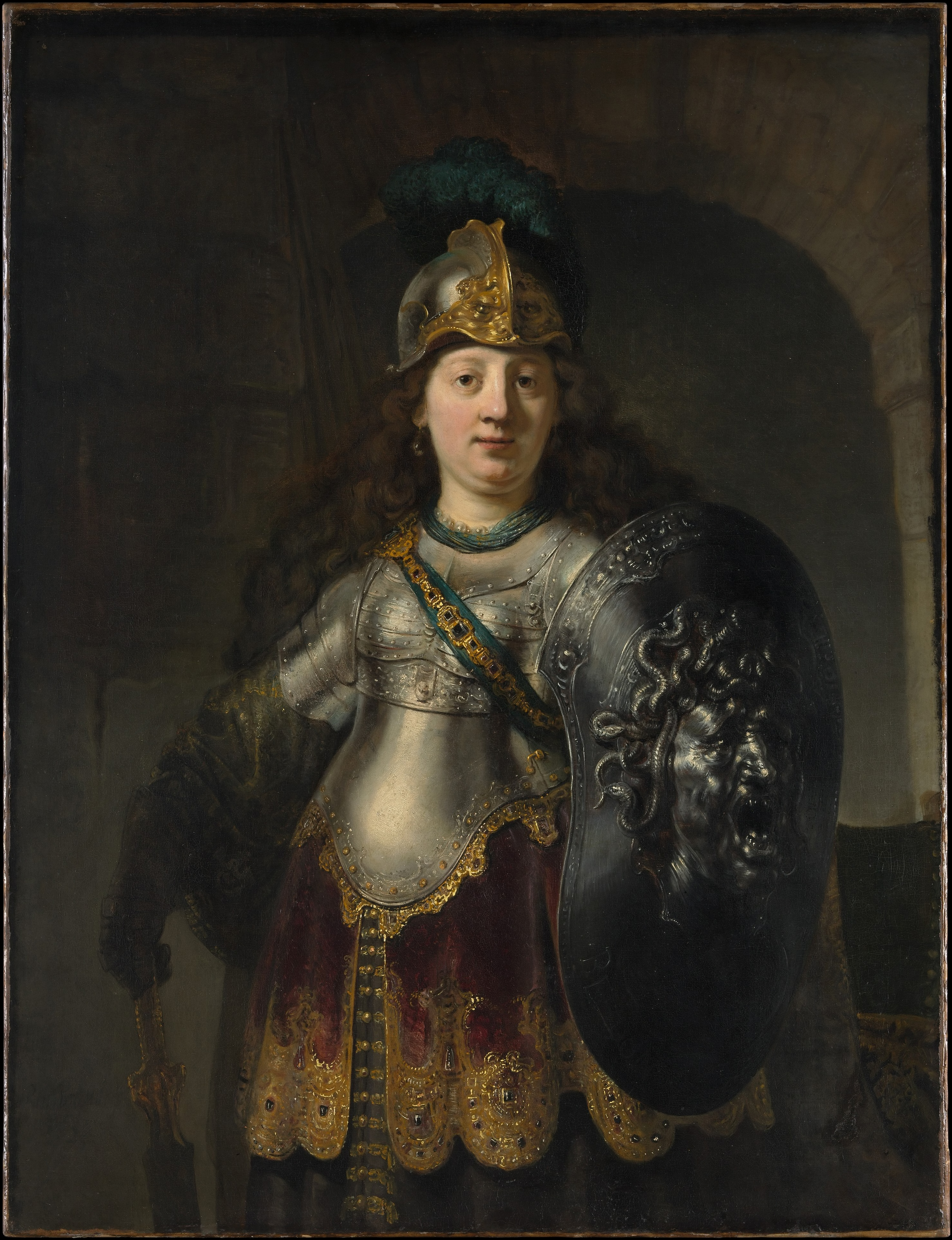
Rembrandt van Rijn, Bellona now in the Metropolitan Museum of Art

==== The Chapel ====
Located immediately behind the Eastern Pavilion, the Chapel was created in 1742–1748 and originally rose through two floors. The room was divided into two floors in 1929 when the new school chapel was built, all the timber panelling being reused in the new chapel. Only the plaster ceiling decoration survives, this consists of octagons, crosses and hexagons. The elaborate carved wood panelling of cedarwood came from a house in Cornwall also called Stowe. It had been carved by Michael Chuke, a pupil of Grinling Gibbons. The most elaborate pieces of carving were the gallery on the south side, the octagonal pulpit dated 1707 and the elaborate reredos that reached nearly the full height of the room, the lower half having two Corinthian columns flanking the altar above which used to hang a copy of Peter Paul Rubens' painting of 'Holy Lamb'. This in turn was flanked by rich carving of fruit and plants. Above was a very rich carving of the Royal Arms.

==== The Gothic Library ====
Situated on the ground floor beneath the centre part of the Large Library, this room was created in 1805. It was the last major interior to be added to the house and was designed by Sir John Soane. The plaster ceiling pattern is based on a very shallow fan vault. The plasterer was one William Rothwell, who charged £495 10 shillings & 7 pence. The centre of the ceiling contains a circular panel 4 feet 6 inches (1.37 m) in diameter that contains 726 painted armorial bearings of the various families that the then Marquess was descended. the wooden bookshelves include glazed bronze doors based on the bronze screen around Henry VII's tomb in Westminster Abbey. The fireplace was supplied by a brass-founder Thomas Catherwood in 1807 for £100. This room used to contain amongst other treasures 1085 Saxon & Irish manuscripts, the Saxon Manuscripts were inherited from Thomas Astle under the terms of his will in 1803 on payment of £500, the Irish manuscripts were purchased from Charles O'Conor in 1804. These are now either in the British Library or Royal Irish Academy including the Stowe Missal. The manuscripts now in the British Library include The Medieval Bestiary, Stowe MS 1067 and the Psalter, Stowe 2 (Psalter). The room was furnished with ebonized mahogany tables and chairs inlaid with ivory, one of the tables is now in the collection of the Victoria and Albert Museum. The door from the library has on the outside a carved stone relief dated to the late 16th century, above it, of The Battle of Bosworth Field, the Gothic Staircase by the door connects the two libraries.

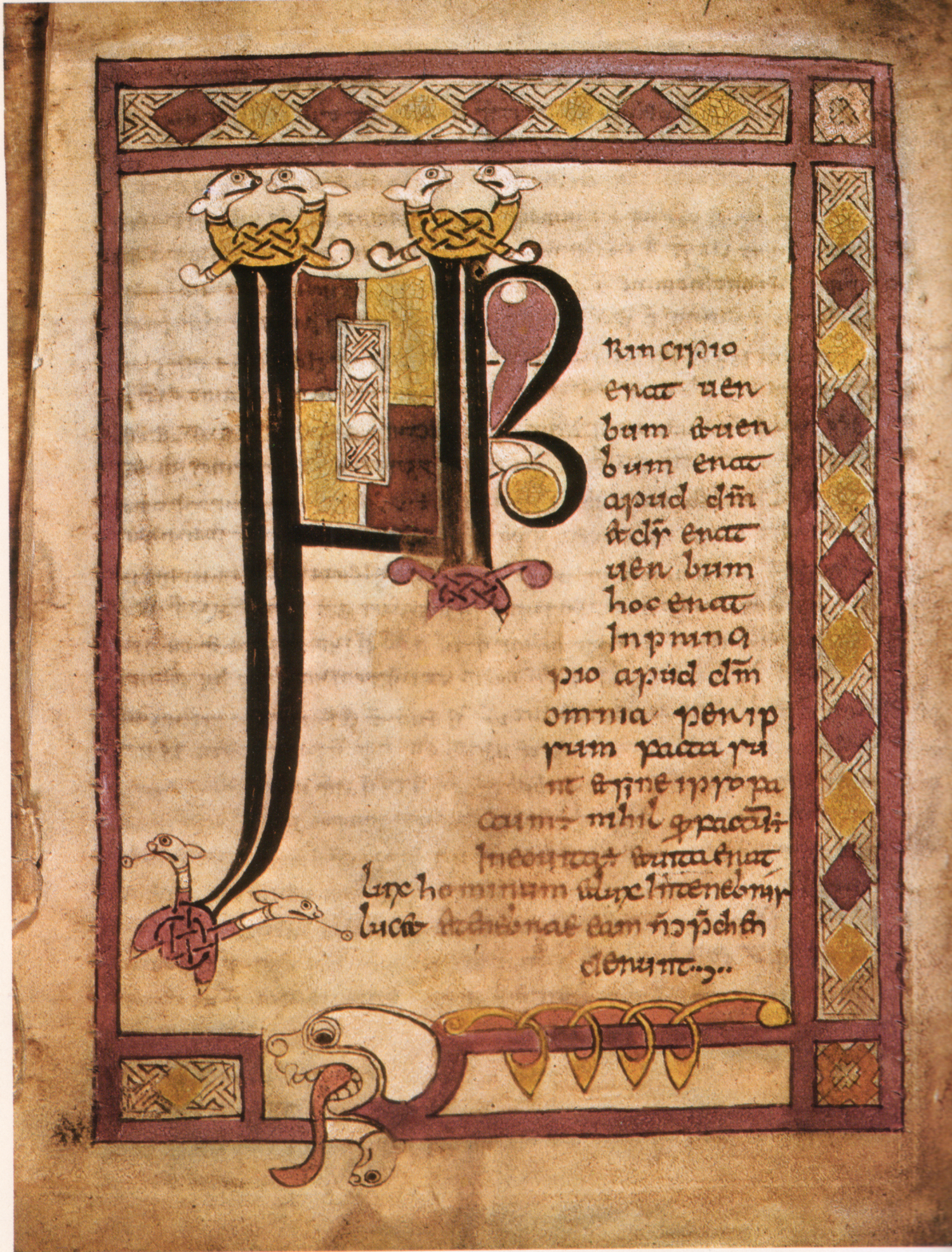
Initial Page from Stowe Missal, now in the Royal Irish Academy, Dublin

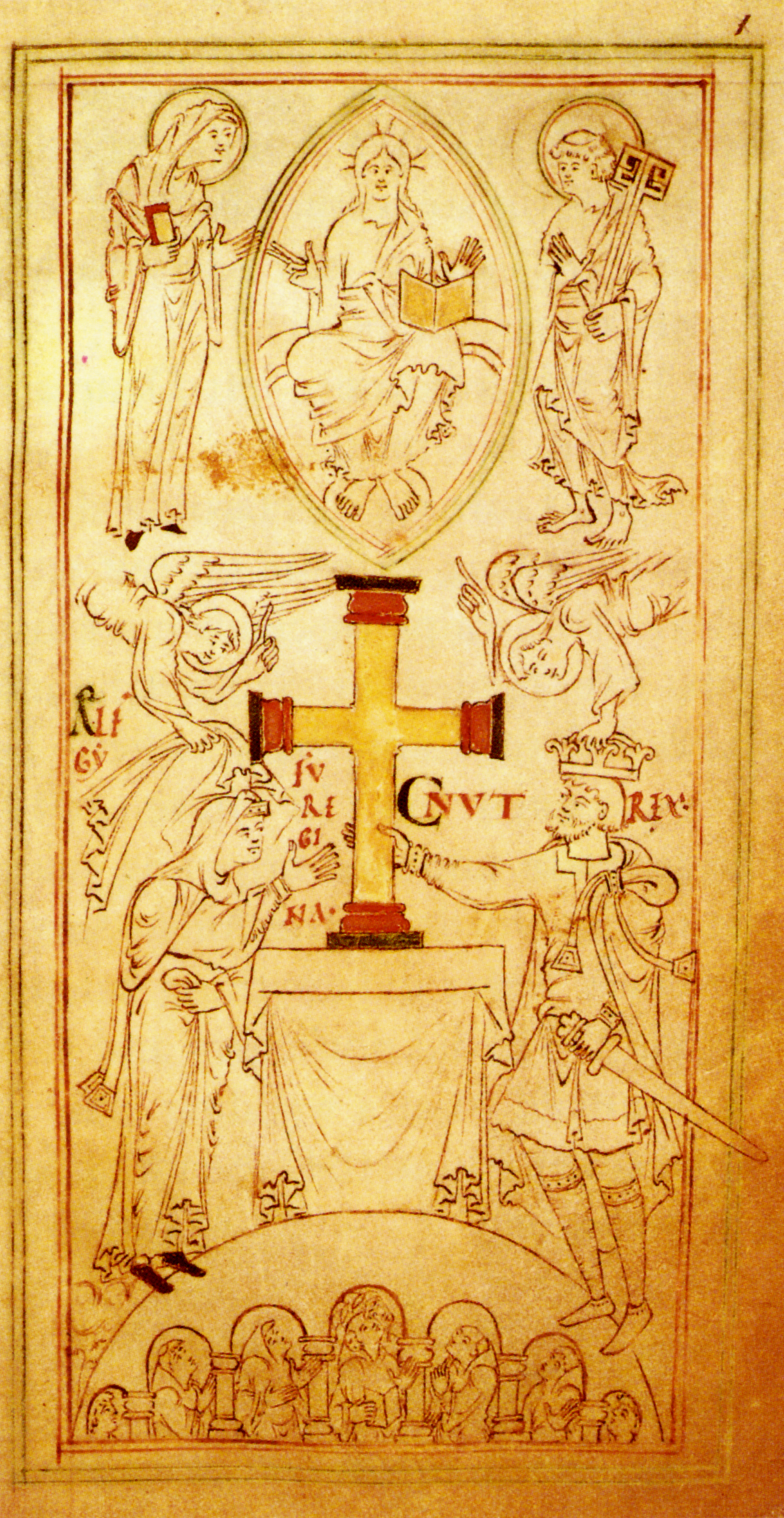
King Canute & Queen Ælfgifu from Stowe Ms 944, folio 6, now in the British Library

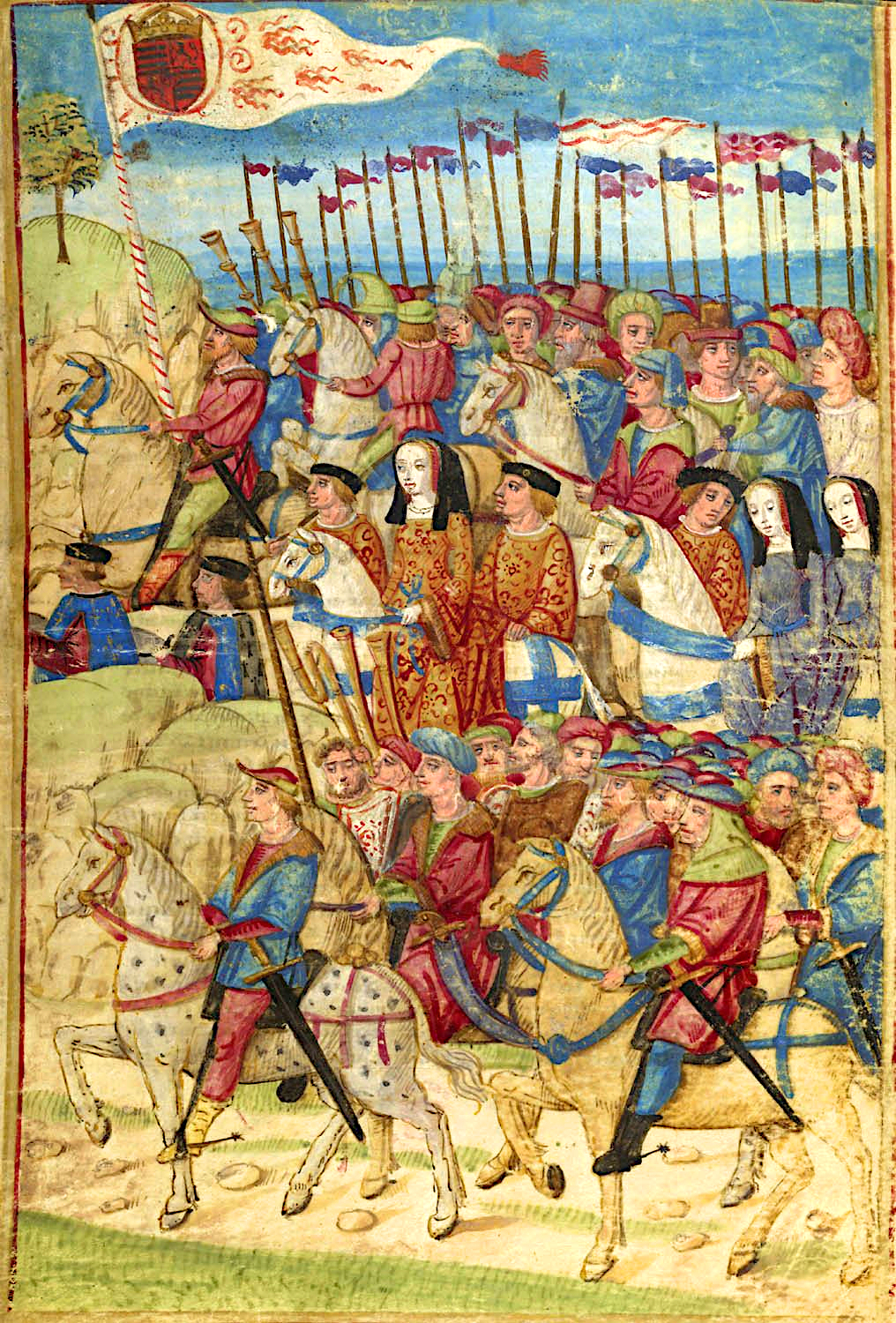
Anne de Foix, from Stowe Ms 584, folio 71v, now in the British Library

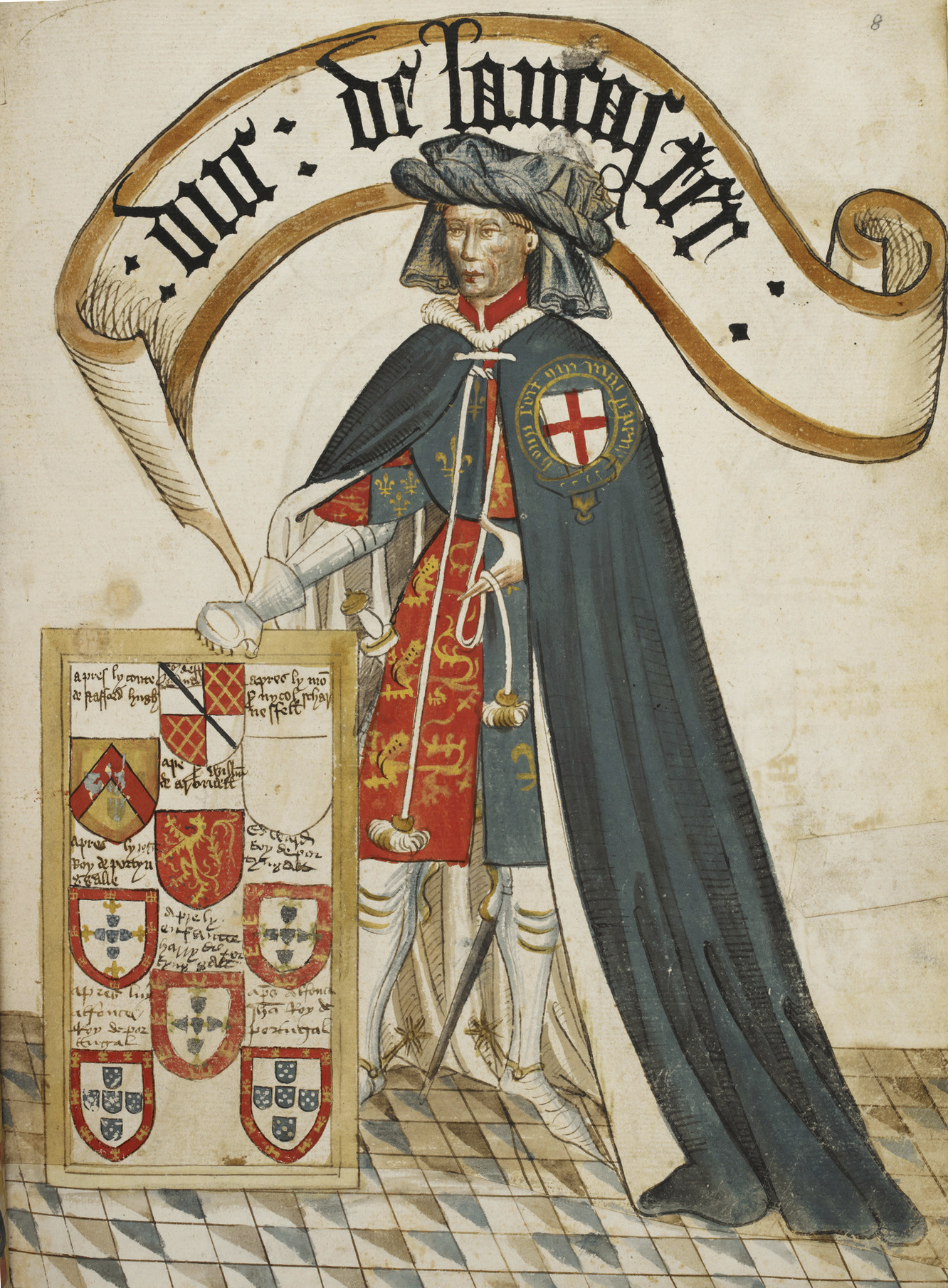
Henry of Grosmont, Duke of Lancaster, from the Bruges Garter Book, Stowe Ms 594, folio 8, now in the British Library

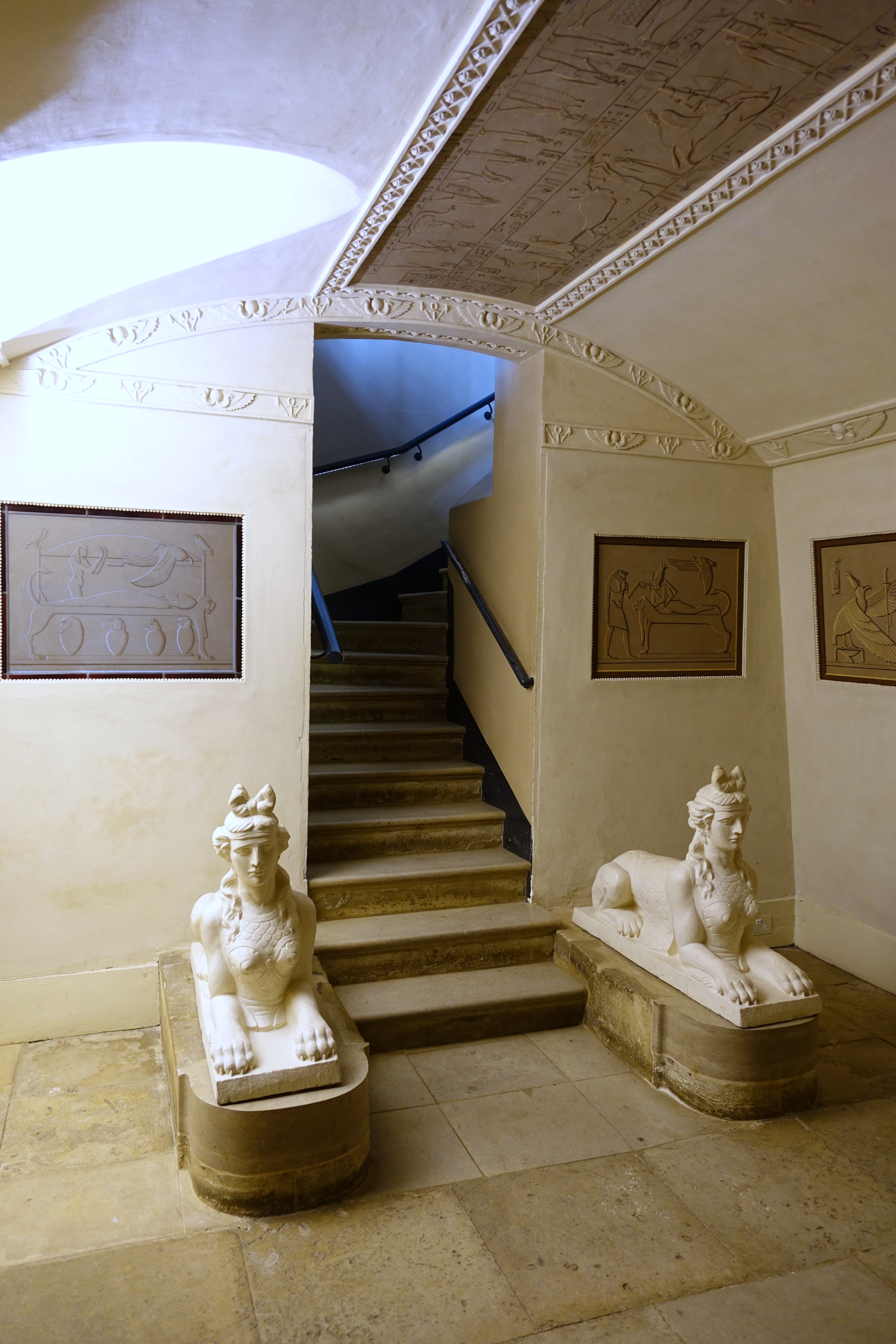
The Egyptian Hall

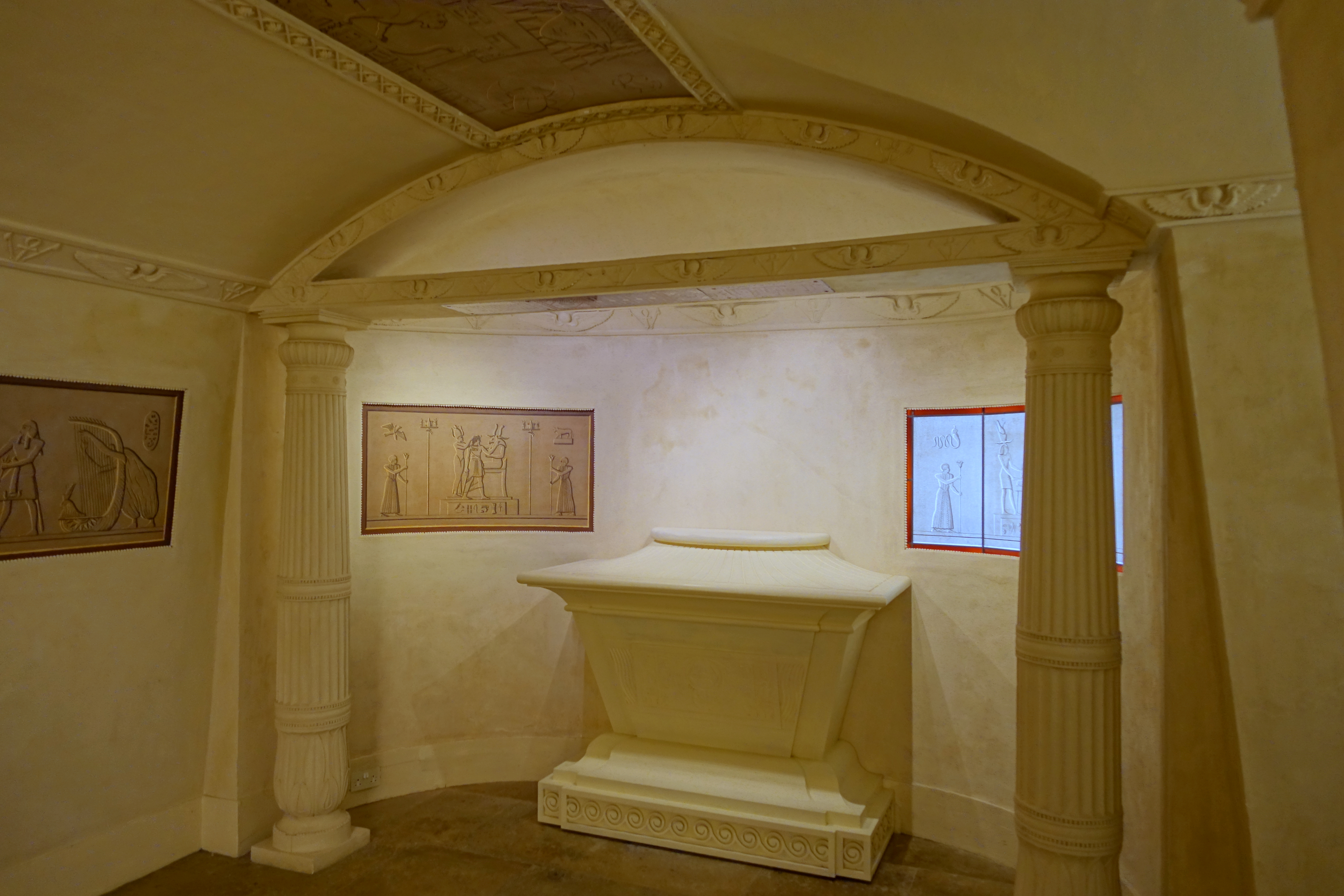
The Egyptian Hall

==== The Egyptian Hall ====
Created c.1803, the Egyptian Hall is situated beneath the North Hall to which it is connected by the staircase by the east wall which was inserted at this time, and was created as the winter entrance, linked to the Porte-cochère created at the same time, beneath the North Portico with ramps connecting to the forecourt to allow carriages to pick up and set down passengers under cover. Decorated in the Egyptian style of decoration. The room has inward sloping walls and a vaulted ceiling, the western end of the room has a recess flanked by two Egyptian style lotus columns that originally contained a heating stove in the form of a carved sarcophagus, removed in 1922. The frieze around the ceiling is decorated with a winged solar disk, the symbol of the god Ra, and uraei between falcon wings, which alternate with Ankh, the symbol of life, flanked by sceptres, symbols of power. There is an illuminated sun globe over the south door. Also sold in 1922 were seven canvas sepia paintings on the walls which depicted Egyptian figures and hieroglyphics and two sculptures of Sphinxes that used to be at the base of the staircase. The designer of the room is not known for certain, though Sir John Soane implied in a lecture that the 1st Marquess was responsible for the concept. In 2012 all the missing decoration and sculpture was recreated, returning the room to its original form.

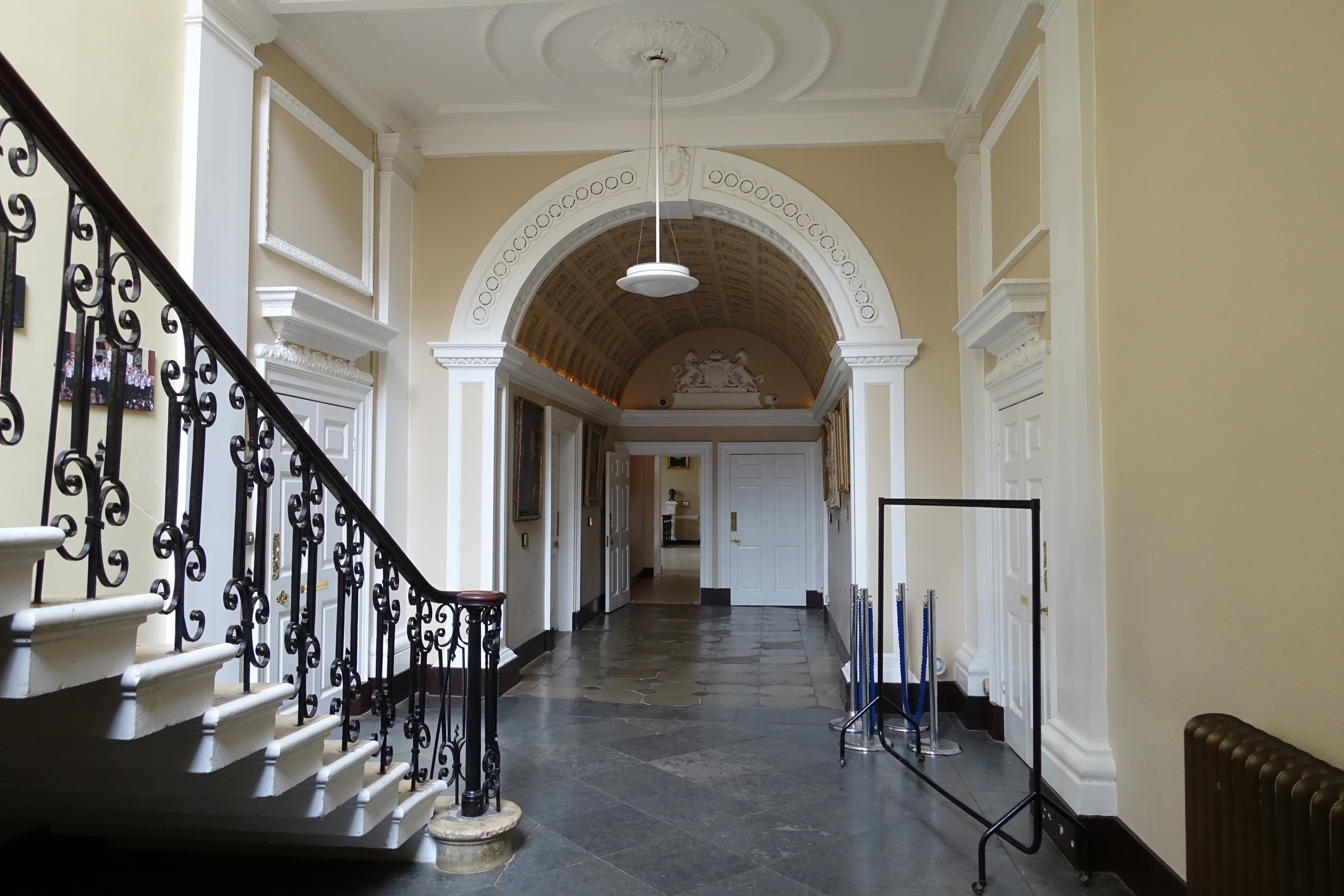
The West Corridor and foot of West Staircase

The East Corridor and Grand staircase

Dating from the 1730s, connects the North Hall via the south-east door with the Ante-Library, this is a relatively plain room, the stone staircase at the east end of the corridor is cantilevered from the walls and has a wrought iron balustrade, the ceiling above the staircase is painted with Fame and Victory by Francesco Sleter, the same artist's wall paintings on the staircase were thought to no longer survive, but in 2016 it was discovered that beneath later paintwork the wall murals are largely intact. Small sections have been exposed, revealing a grisaille scheme of trompe-l'œil statues in niches, a decision on whether to uncover and restore the murals has yet to be taken. The walls of the corridor are now lined with paintings of former headmasters of the school and in the east window above the staircase there is white marble bust a copy of the head of the Apollo Belvedere. There used to be forty-five paintings on the walls, including: Godfrey Kneller's portrait of John, Duke of Marlborough now in the Institute of Directors; Henry Fuseli's paintings of characters from A Midsummer Night's Dream, Titania and Bottom now in Tate Britain and his Oberon wakes Titania now in the Kunstmuseum Winterthur; and attributed to John Closterman, General Michael Richards and his Brother, General John Richards, at the siege of Belgrade now in the Slovak National Gallery. Also originally in the corridor but sold in 1848 were eleven Greek vases, three from the Lucien Bonaparte's excavations at Canino, also a Roman sarcophagus dating from Trajan's reign.

==== The Ante-Library ====
Located immediately to the north of the Large Library, created in 1805, this is really a wide corridor, about 50 feet (15 m) long, and low in height, with a plain ceiling and walls, the fireplace on the east wall is a replacement for the carved marble one sold in 1922. The main feature of the room are the eight Tuscan columns of scagliola imitating Verd antique marble, the work of Domenico Bartoli. The room housed in 1838 a series of 52 family portraits, including: The Rt Hon. George Greville prime minister, by Sir Joshua Reynolds, now in the Bass Museum; a posthumous portrait of George, Marquess of Buckingham, by John Jackson now at Christ Church, Oxford; Mary Nugent, Marchioness of Buckingham by Sir Joshua Reynolds, last sold in 1989 and present whereabouts unknown; William Wyndham, Lord Grenville by John Hoppner now in the North Carolina Museum of Art.

==== The Stucco Corridor and West staircase ====
Reached from the south-west door in the North Hall via the Stucco Corridor with its plaster barrel vaulted coffered ceiling is the cantilevered stone West staircase with iron balustrade, dating from the 1730s, James Gibbs is thought to be the designer.

==== Other Interiors ====
There are various smaller rooms on the main floor of the house, mainly plain in decoration but used to house many important paintings, including: two paintings of 1648 by Frans Hals, Portrait of a man now in the Art Gallery of Ontario and Portrait of a Woman now in the Museum of Fine Arts, Boston; Orazio Gentileschi's The Rest on the Flight into Egypt now in the J. Paul Getty Museum; Claude Joseph Vernet's Rocky Coast in a Storm in the Wallace Collection; Giovanni Battista Lusieri's A View of Naples over nine feet in length this water colour remained in the house until sold in 1985 to the J. Paul Getty Museum; Joshua Reynolds painting of the Marquess of Buckingham was sold by Lady Kinloss in 1899 and is now in the National Gallery of Ireland; John Martin's The Destruction of Pompeii and Herculaneum now in the Tate Britain collection, originally thought to be destroyed in 1928 when the Thames flooded the gallery basement, it has since been rediscovered and restored in 2010–2011; Jan van Huysum's self-portrait now in the Ashmolean Museum; Aert de Gelder's The Temple Entrance now in the Mauritshuis.

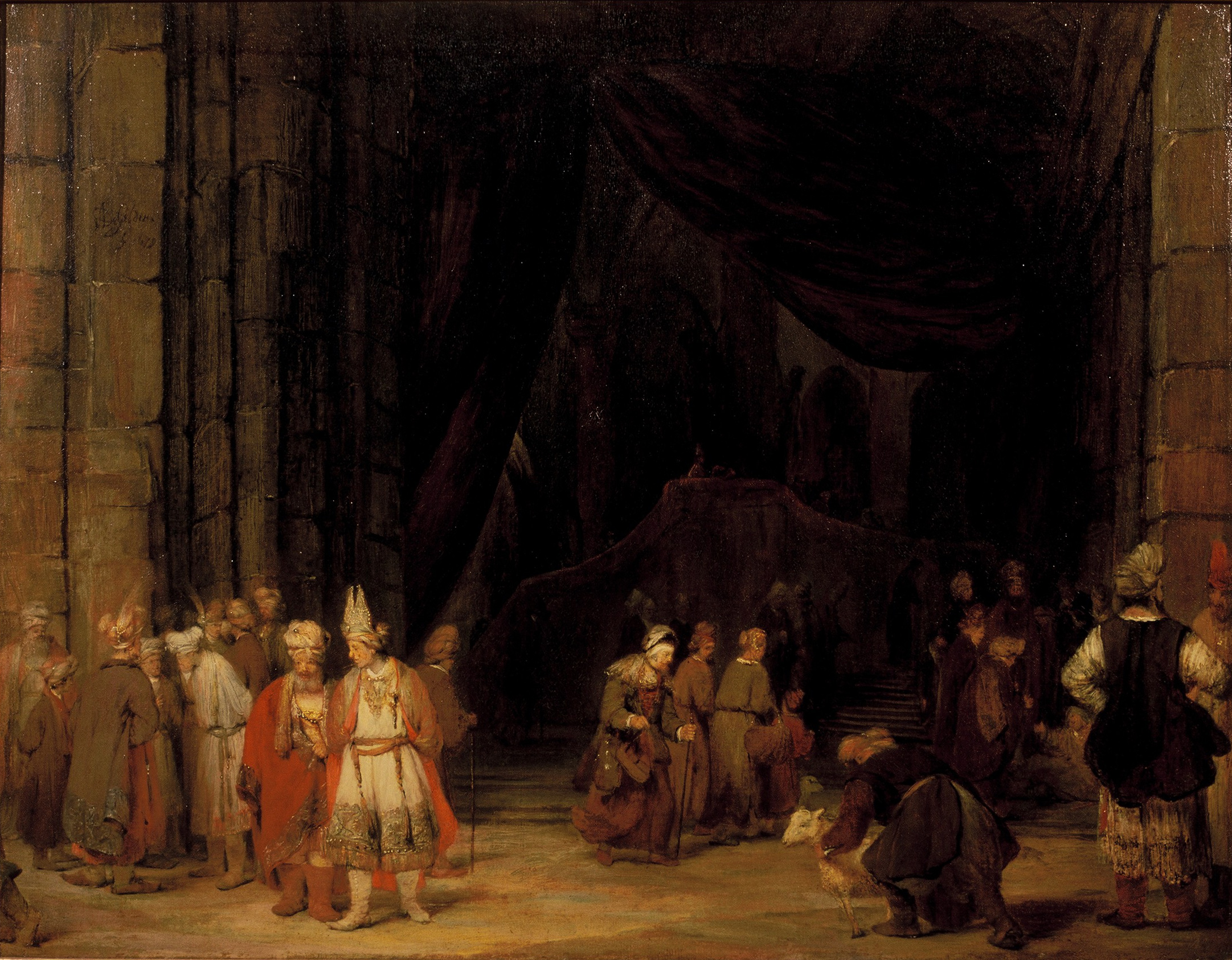
Aert de Gelder's The Temple Entrance, now in the Mauritshuis

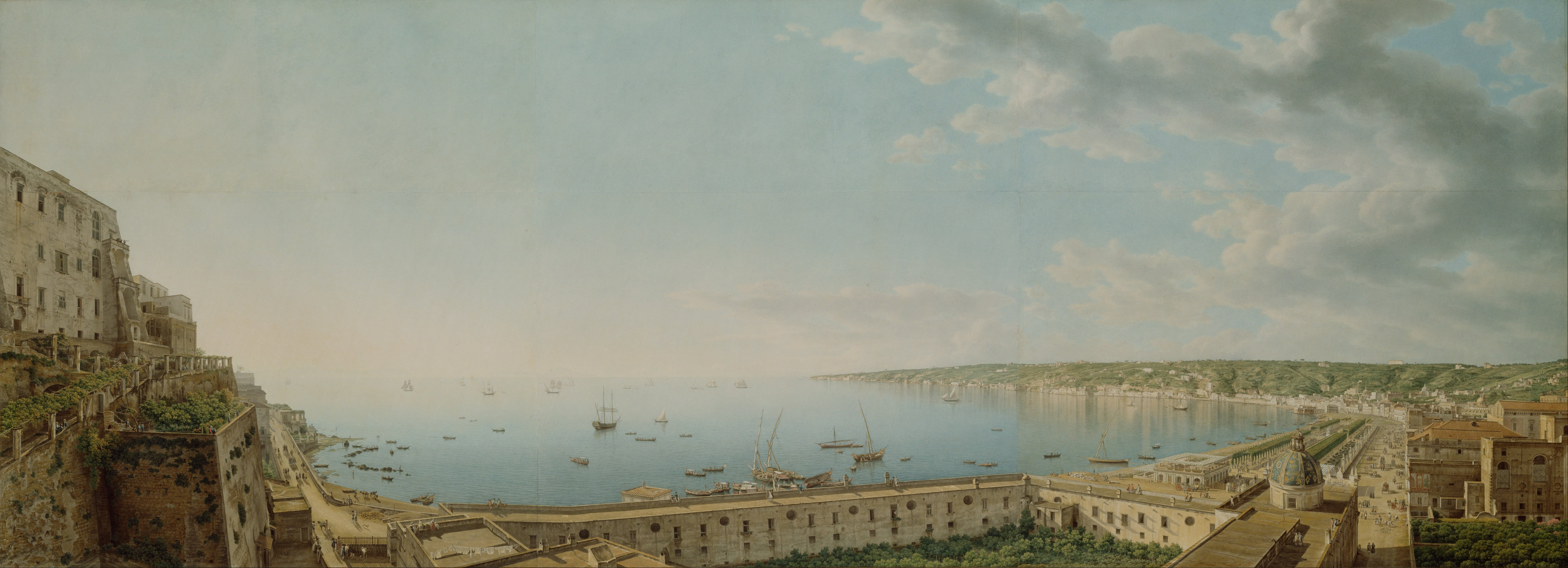
Giovanni Battista Lusieri's A View of Naples,
now in the J. Paul Getty Museum

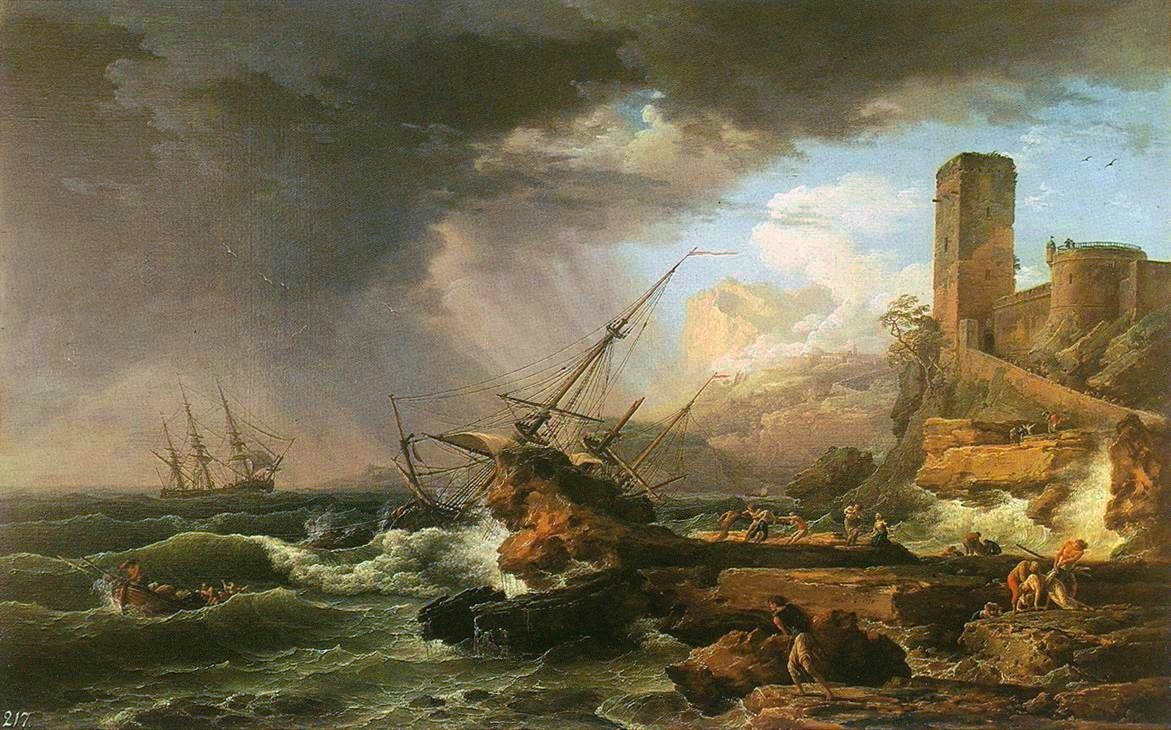
Claude Joseph Vernet's Rocky Coast in a Storm, now in the Wallace Collection

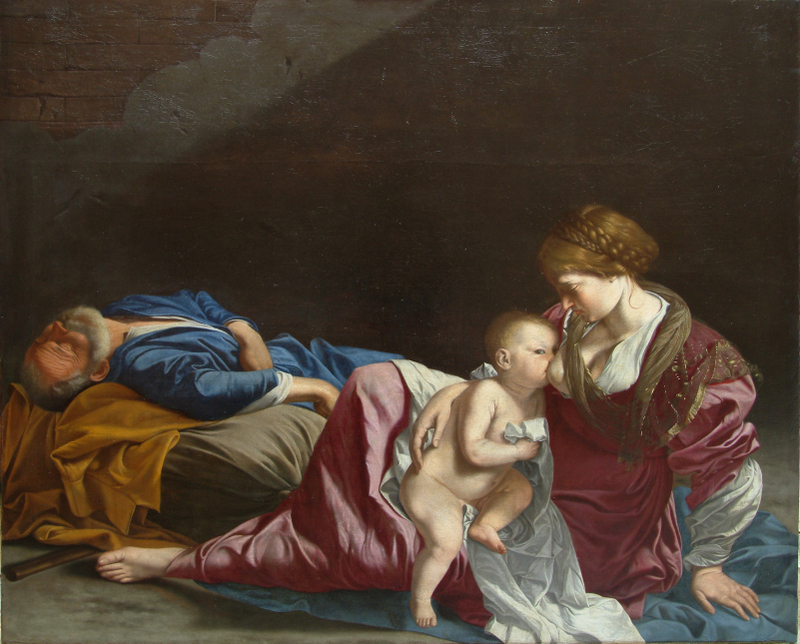
Orazio Gentileschi's Rest on the Flight into Egypt, now in the
J. Paul Getty Museum

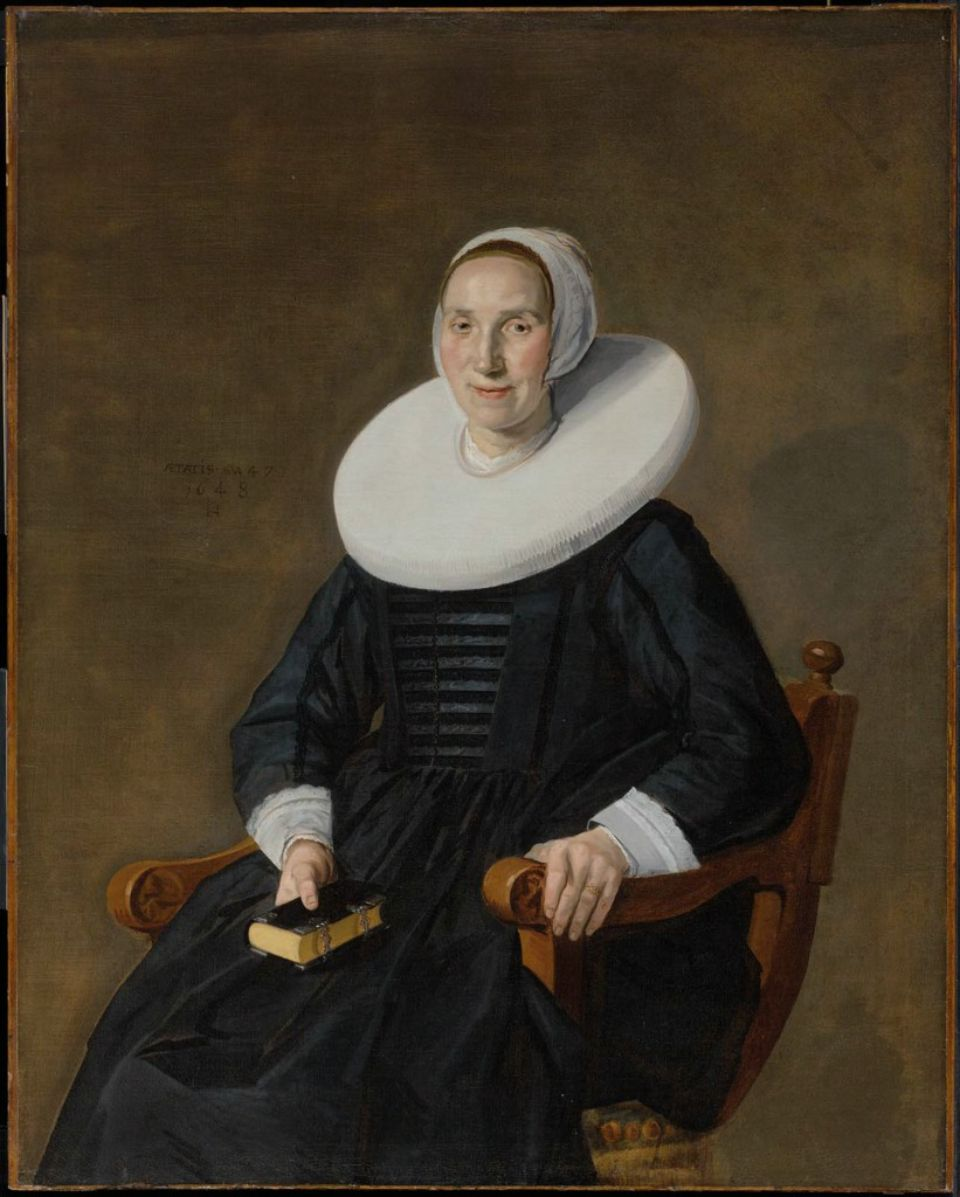
Frans Hals' "Portrait of a Woman", now in the Boston Museum of Fine Arts
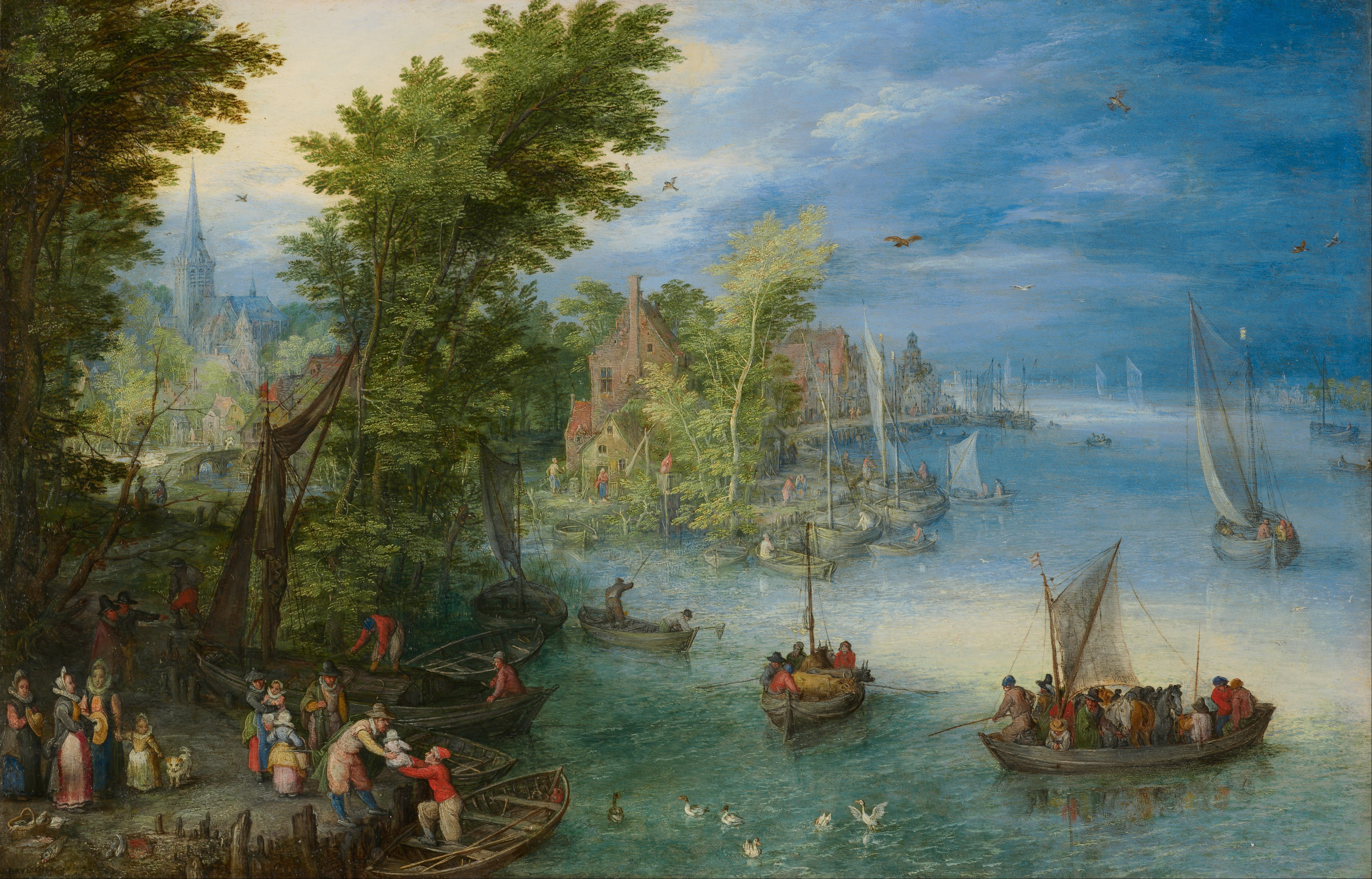
Jan Brueghel the Elder's River landscape, now in the National Gallery of Art

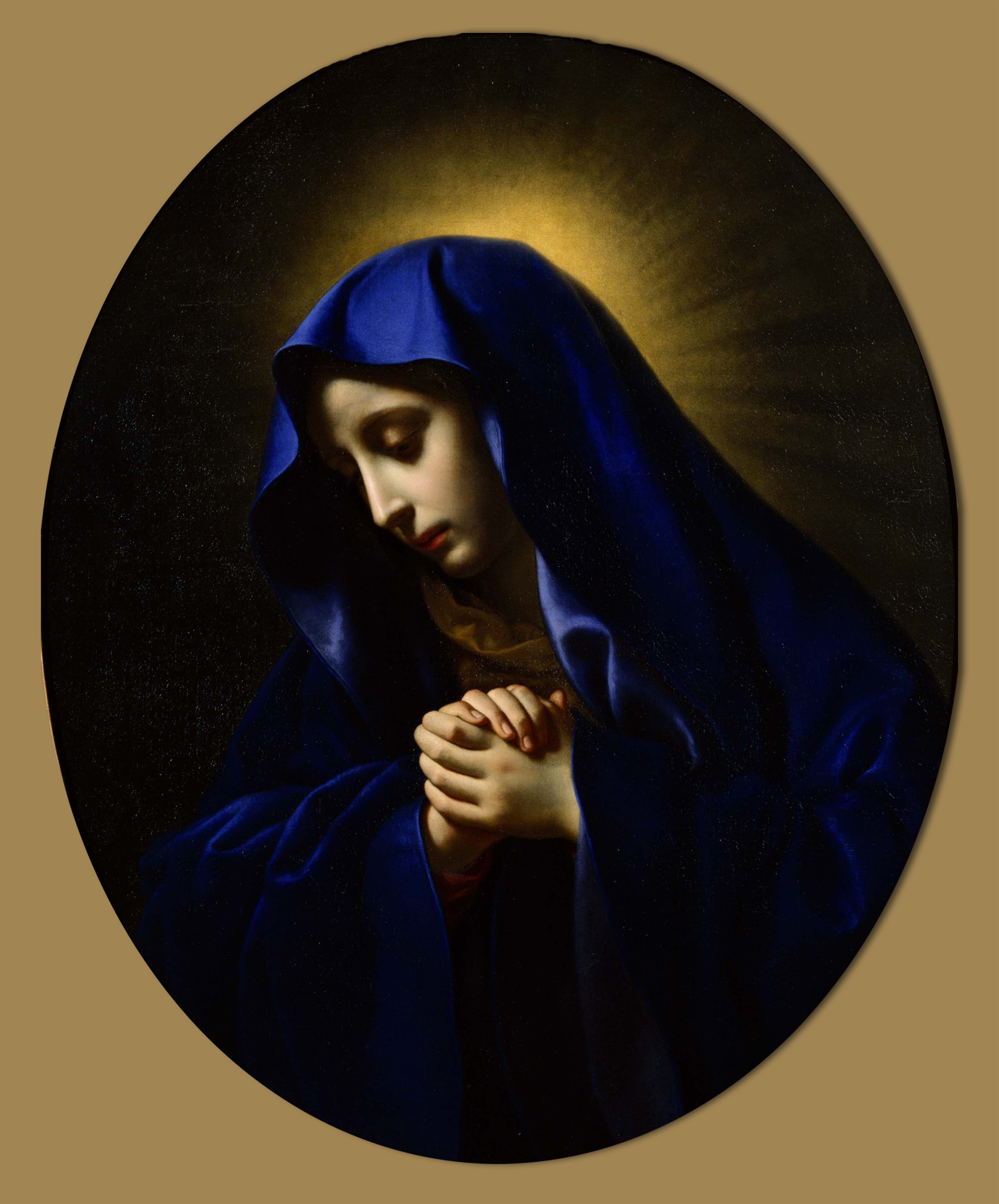
Carlo Dolci's Mater Dolorosa, now in the National Museum of Western Art

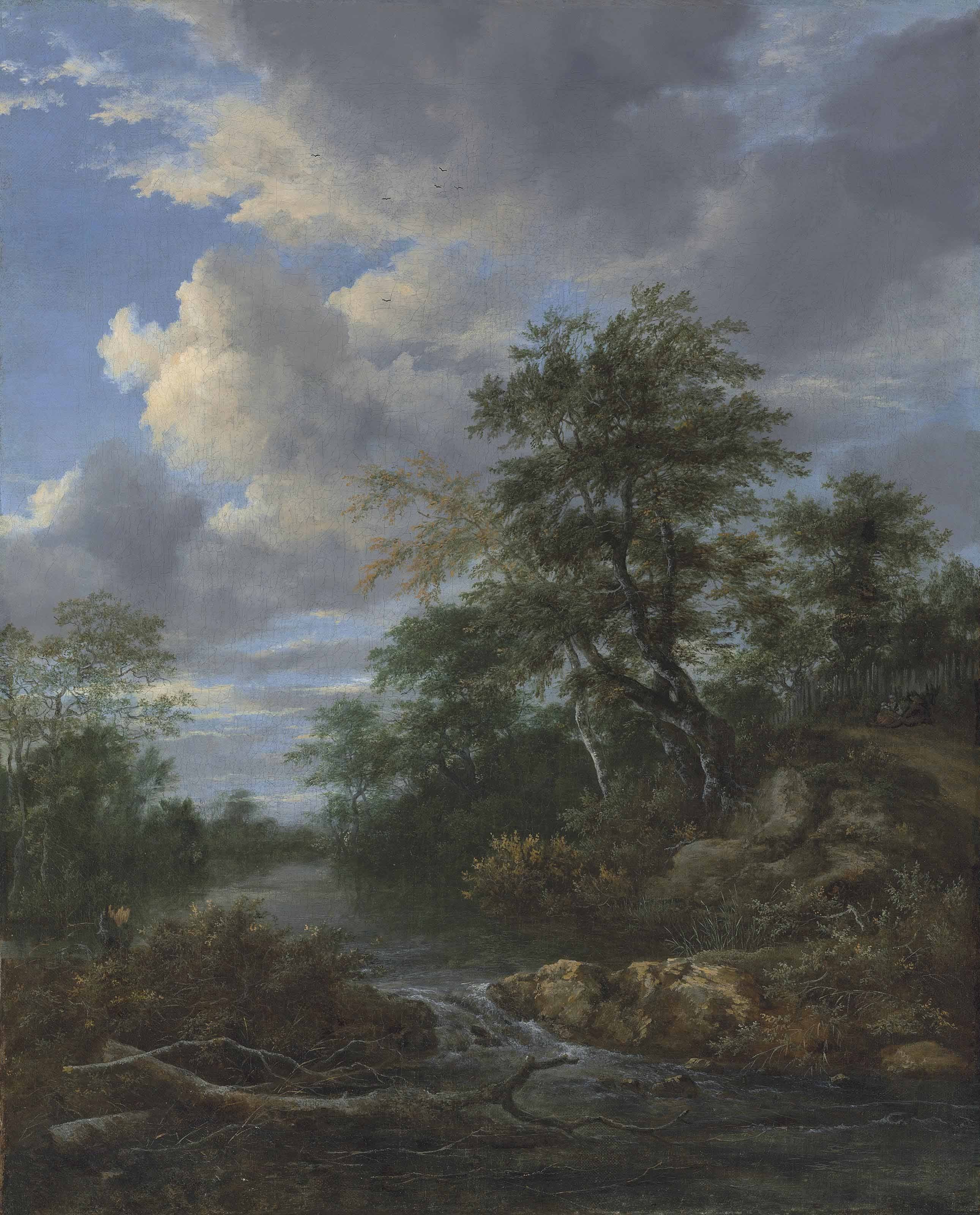
Jacob van Ruisdael's A wooded river landscape with a family at rest on a track, now in a private collection

==== Other areas of the house ====
The house contains over 400 rooms. The ground floor rooms to the east of the Gothic Library were used by the family as personal rooms including the Billiard room, Sitting room, Water closet, Manuscript room, Gun room and Plunge pool. The rest of the ground floor was given over to the service areas. The house has low wings that are set back and project from the east and west pavilions of the south front. These extend north before projecting even further east and west. The full length of the house is over 900 feet (270 m). These wings to the east included the riding school, coach houses and at the extreme east the stables designed by Vanbrugh. The west area includes the kitchen (still used as such by the school), the laundry, the dairy and at the extreme west the 138-foot-long (42 m) orangery, designed by Vanbrugh. Although the Central Pavilion of the south front appears to be only two floors high, there are in fact bedrooms over the State Music & Drawing rooms, these are lit by windows facing respectively east and west. The centre is filled by the Marble Saloon which rises to the full height of the building. There are more bedrooms on the 1st, 2nd and 3rd floors of the north front, and the west and east pavilions of the south front, where the 2nd floor is disguised in the same way as in the central pavilion.

=== Gallery of architects, garden designers and artists who worked at Stowe ===
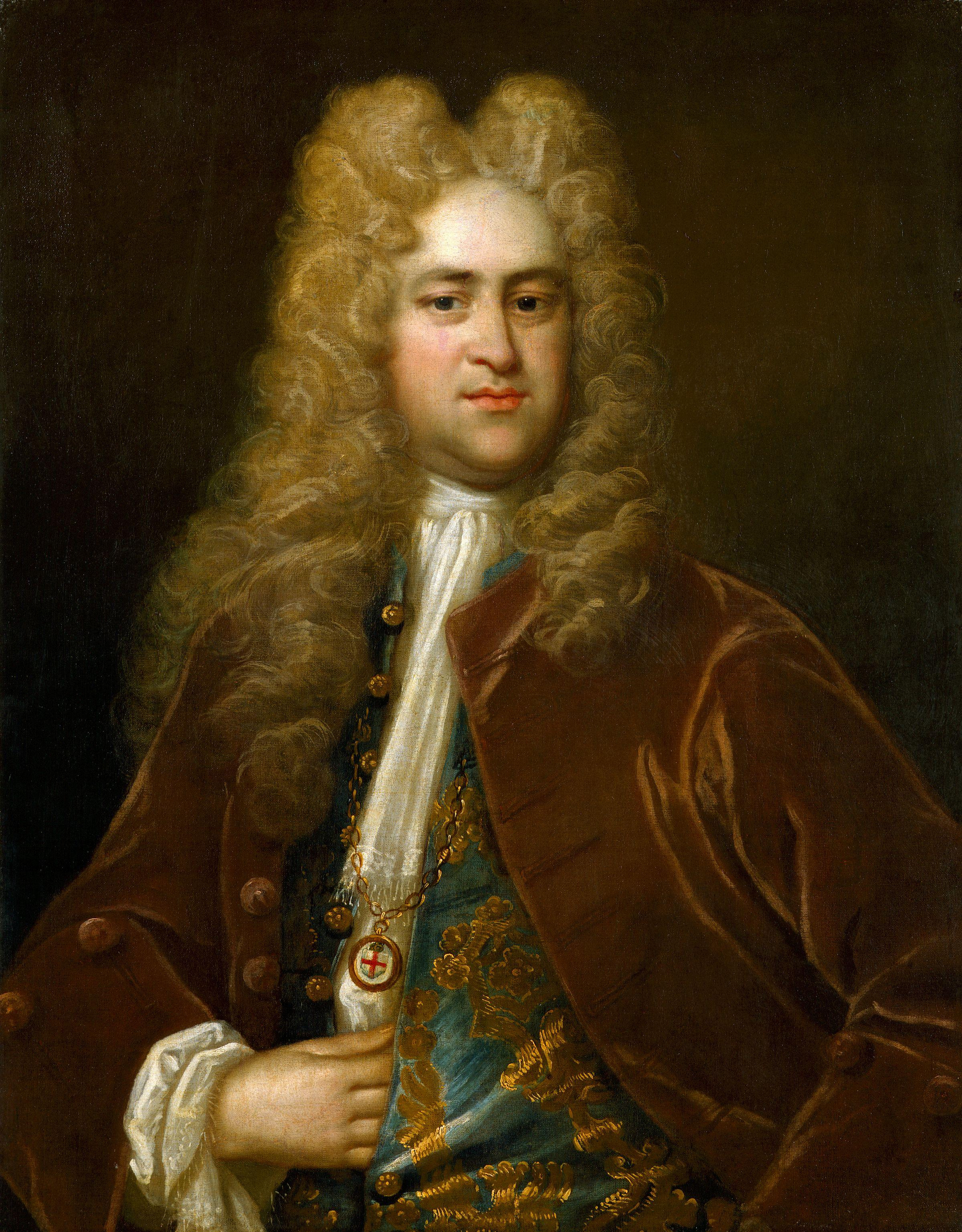
Sir John Vanbrugh, 1664-1726 (architect, worked at Stowe c.1720 to 1726)

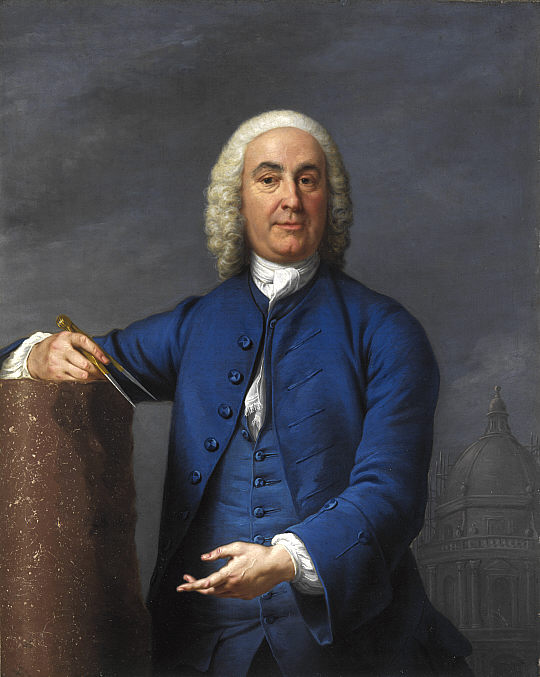
James Gibbs, 1682-1754 (architect, worked at Stowe 1726 to 1749)

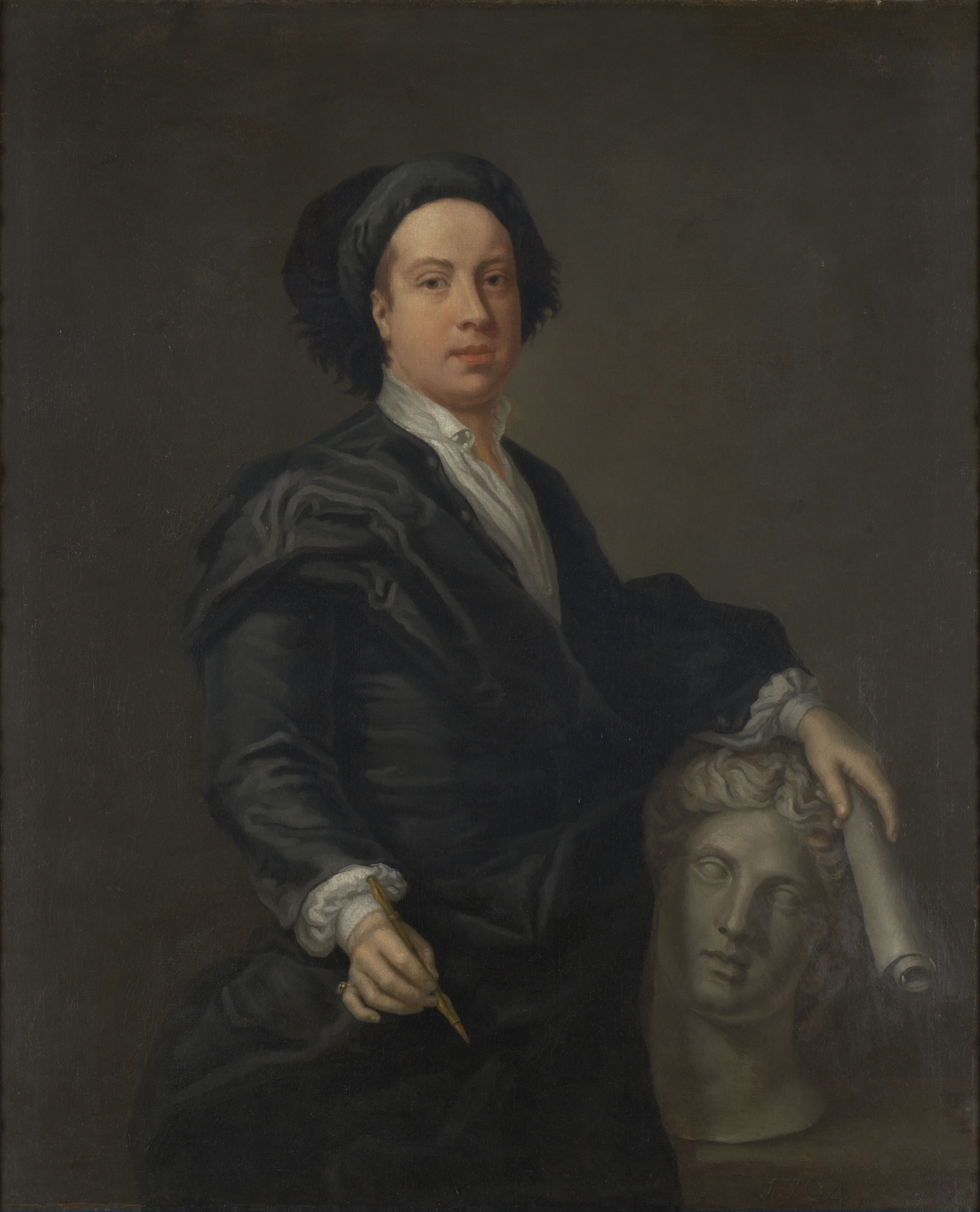
William Kent, 1685-1748 (architect, painter and garden designer, worked at Stowe 1731 to 1748)

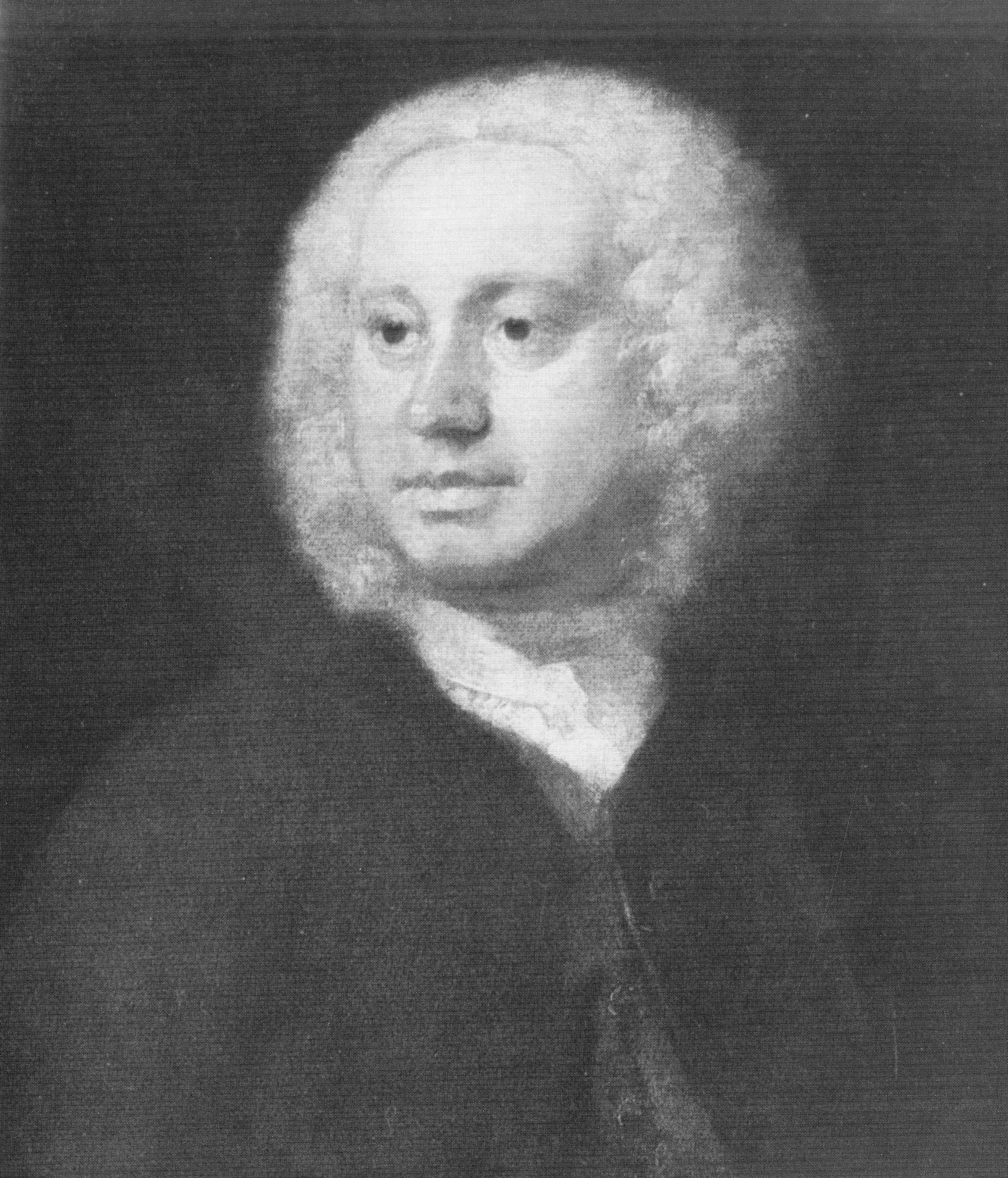
Charles Bridgeman, 1690-1738, (garden designer, worked at Stowe 1711 to 1733)

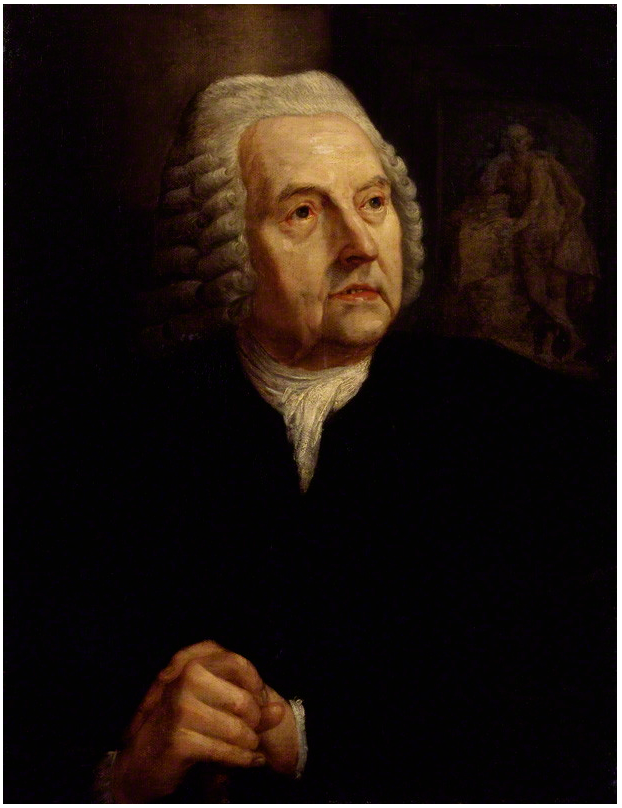
Peter Scheemakers, 1691-1781 (sculptor, carved the statues in the Temple of Ancient Virtue, The pediment on the Temple of Concord & Victory and eight of the British Worthies)

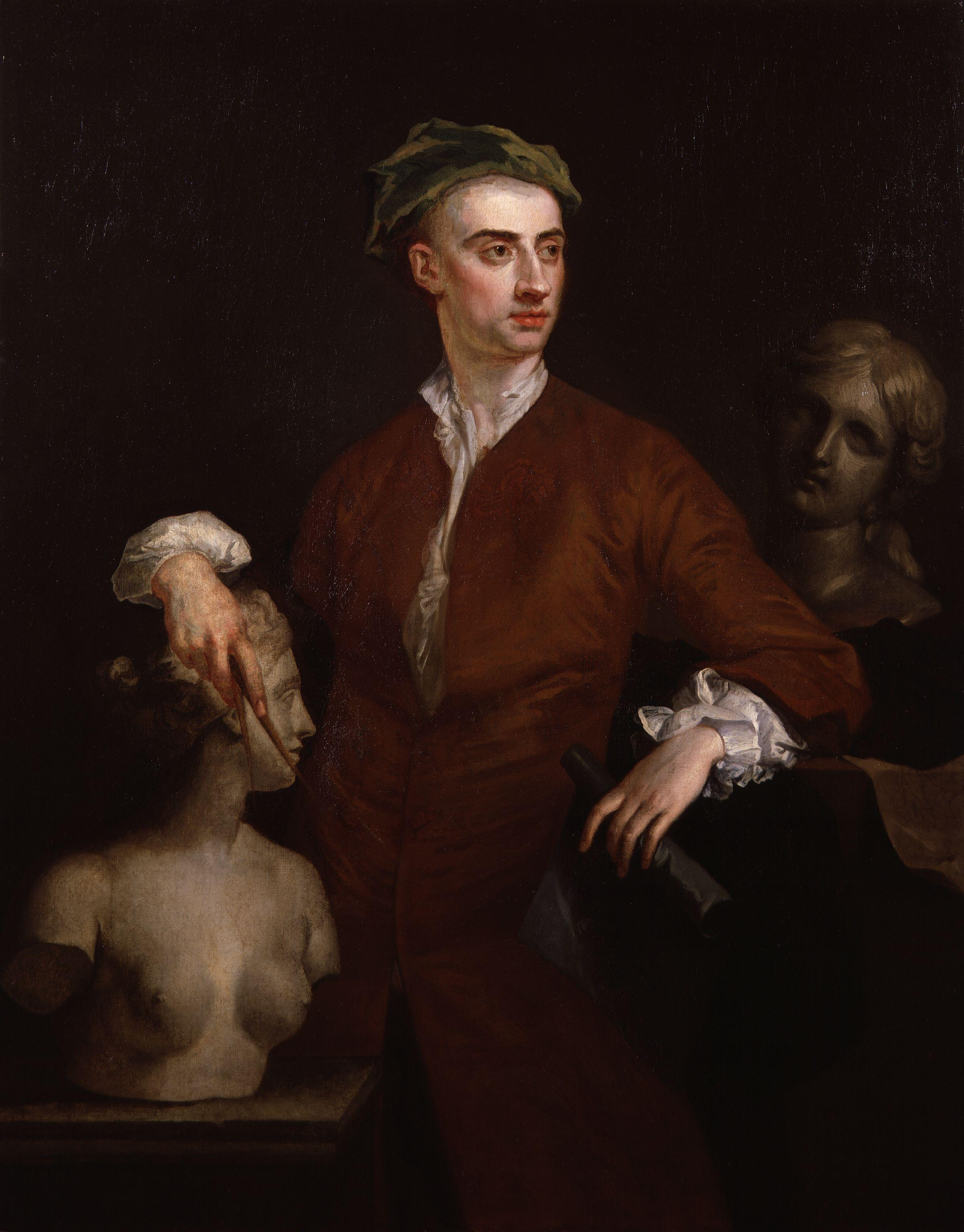
John Michael Rysbrack, 1694-1770, (sculptor, carved the Saxon deities and eight of the British Worthies)

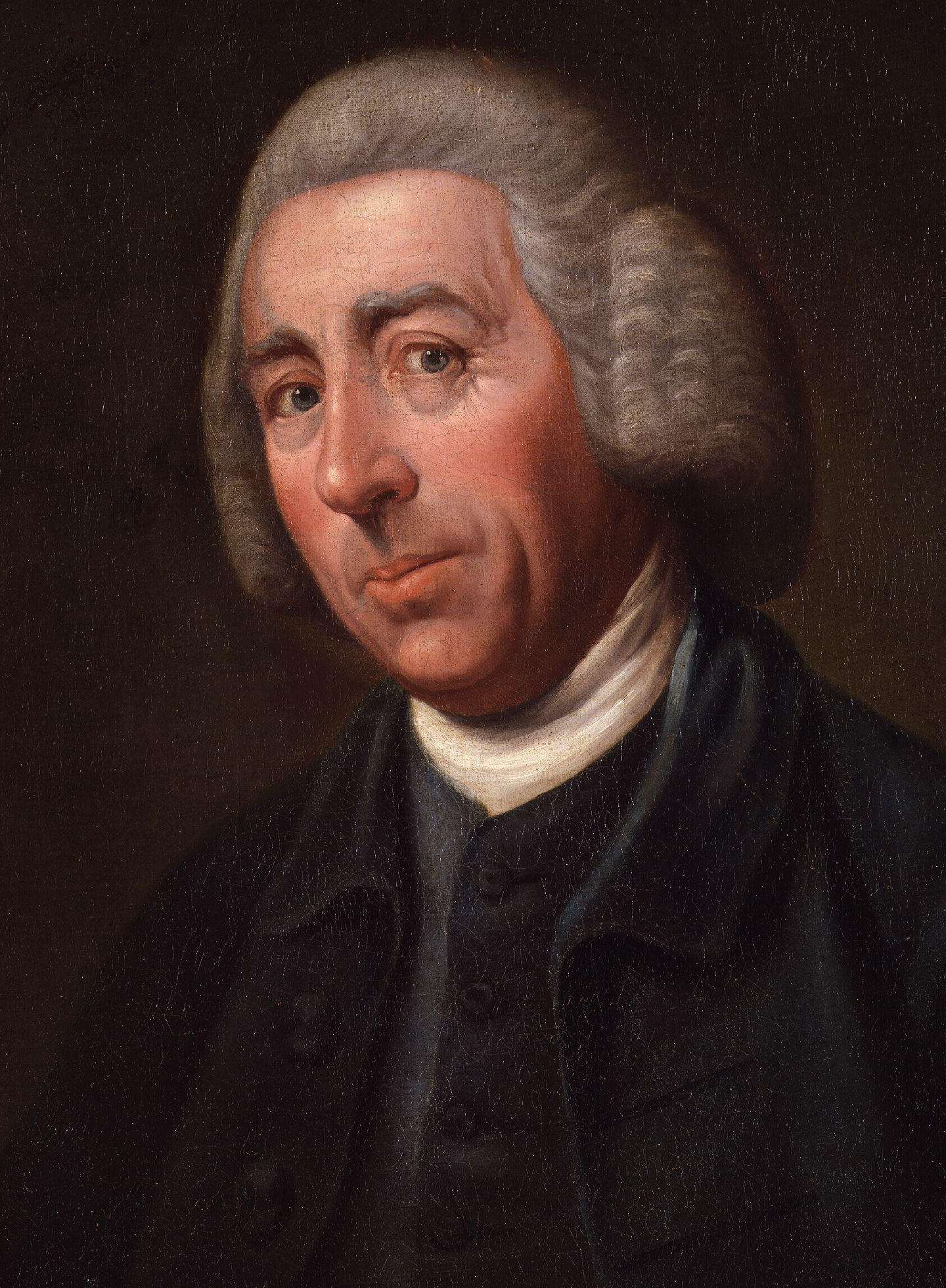
Lancelot 'Capability' Brown, 1716-1783 (garden designer, worked at Stowe 1741 to 1751)

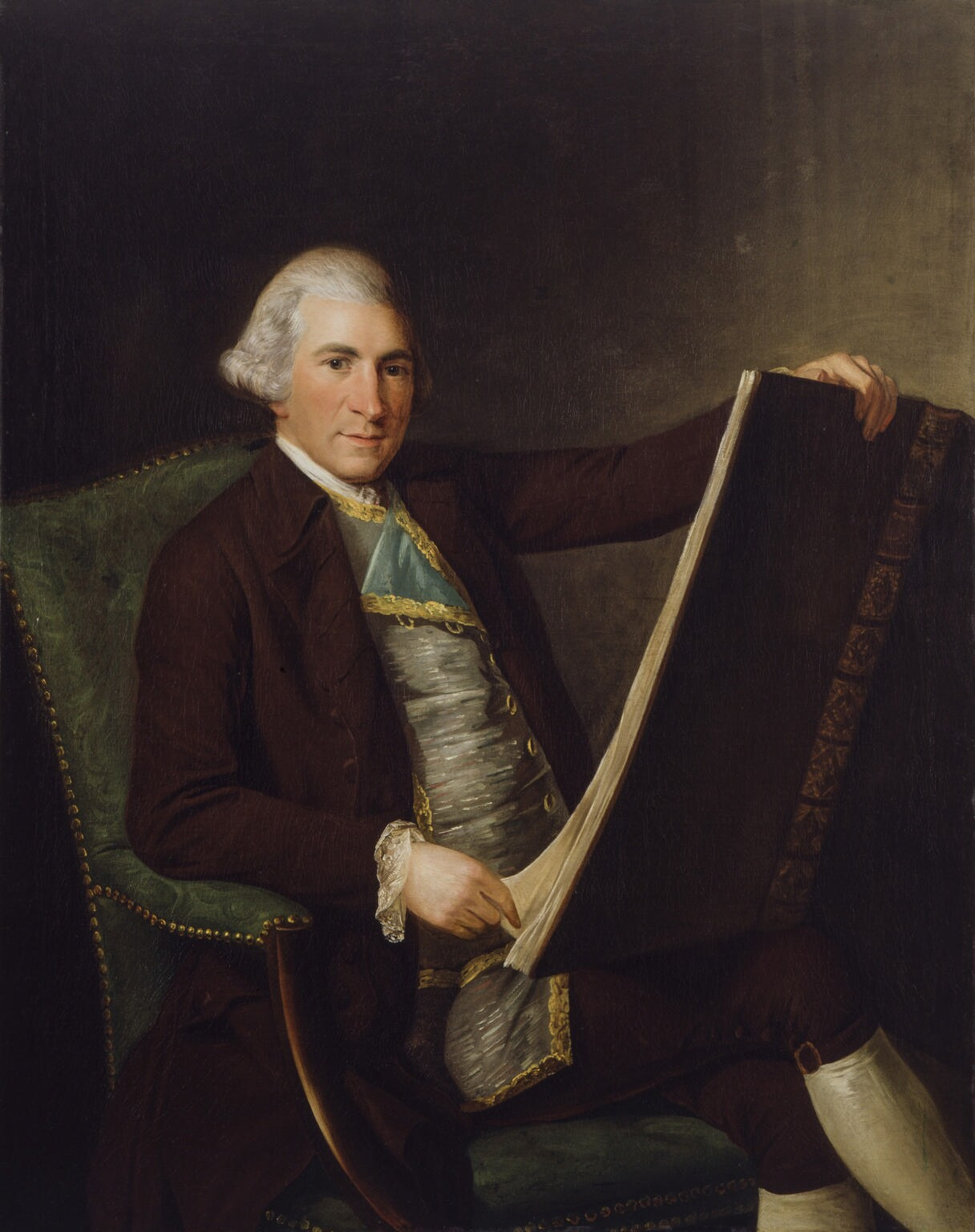
Robert Adam, 1728-1792 (architect, worked at Stowe 1770 to 1771 Adam's design for the south front was modified in execution by Thomas Pitt and completed in 1779)

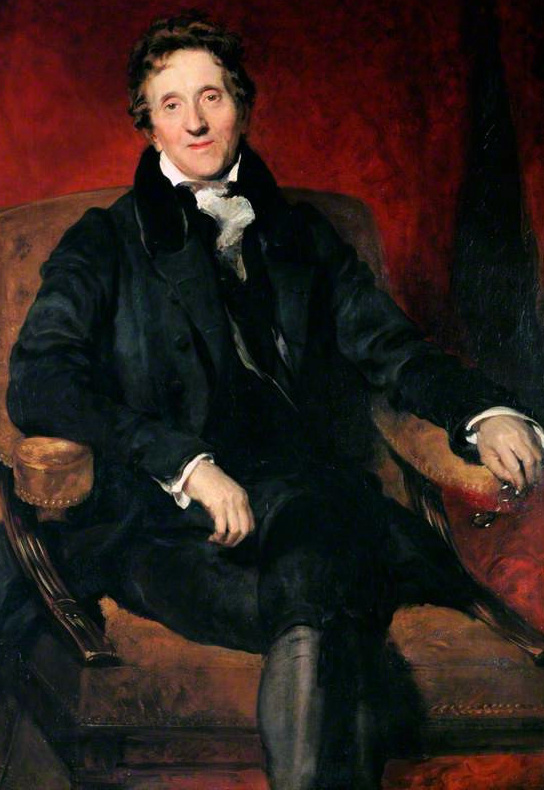
Sir John Soane, 1753-1837 (architect, worked at Stowe 1805 to 1807)

== Gardens and park ==
Described by historian Christopher Hussey as the "outstanding monument to English landscape gardening", the gardens and parkland of Stowe are Grade I listed. The gardens were developed by several generations of the Temple and Grenville families. From the 1710s to the 1740s, leading garden designers were employed by Richard Temple, 1st Viscount Cobham, these included Charles Bridgeman, James Gibbs, William Kent and Capability Brown, as well as architect Sir John Vanbrugh. After Viscount Cobham's death, his nephew Richard Grenville-Temple, 2nd Earl Temple, inherited and he began a programme of naturalisation in the parkland, altering the formation of lakes and woodland, as well as moving monuments to new locations.

The park and gardens saw 213,721 visitors during 2020/21.

== The Temple-Grenville family ==
John Temple was the first member of the family to serve as high sheriff of Buckinghamshire and also justice of the peace. Sir Thomas Temple first purchased a knighthood in 1603 from James I then purchased from the same monarch the baronetcy in 1611. He was the first member of the family to serve as a member of parliament in 1588–1589. Sir Peter Temple was a supporter of Oliver Cromwell and served as a colonel in the parliamentary army during the English Civil War.

When the War of the Spanish Succession broke out in 1702 the 4th Baronet was appointed a colonel by William III, he was later promoted to lieutenant general. First created Baron Cobham in 1714 by George I, then in 1718 Viscount Cobham by the same king. In 1715 he married Anne Halsey an heiress of a rich London brewer. She brought a dowry of £20,000 (equivalent to £3,780,000 as of 2025). He was a member of the Kit-Cat Club where he probably first met fellow members John Vanbrugh and Joseph Addison whose writings on garden design influenced the development of the gardens at Stowe. Cobham was the centre of the Whig party grouping of Cobhamites. His sister Hester was created Countess of Temple in her own right in 1749 by George II, from which her son, heir to the estate inherited his title as 2nd Earl Temple.

Richard Grenville the future 2nd Earl Temple, married Anna Chamber in 1737, an heiress with a £50,000 fortune. He was leader of the Whig group known as the Grenvillites. King George II made Earl Temple a Knight of the Garter in 1760. Earl Temple was an active supporter of John Wilkes. When the Earl's cousin George Dodington, 1st Baron Melcombe died in 1762 he left his Vanbrugh designed house Eastbury Park and estates in Dorset to Lord Temple. He attempted to sell the house, but as no buyer could be found, he demolished most of the building using the marble from the house in the Marble Saloon at Stowe. The Eastbury estate was finally sold in 1806.

The 2nd Earl Temple's sister Hester married William Pitt the Elder who became prime minister of Great Britain. Their son William Pitt the Younger also served as prime minister. George Grenville the brother of the 2nd Earl Temple was also to serve as prime minister. William Grenville youngest brother of the 1st Marquess of Buckingham also served as prime minister, and it was during his premiership that the Atlantic slave trade was abolished. The final family member to be prime minister was William Ewart Gladstone. He married Catherine Glynne the granddaughter of Catherine, sister of the 1st Marquess of Buckingham. Other notable politicians in the family included Thomas Grenville the brother of the 1st Marquess, Robert Nugent, 1st Earl Nugent the father-in-law of the 1st Marquess, Thomas Pitt, 1st Baron Camelford brother of William Pitt the elder, George Nugent-Grenville, 2nd Baron Nugent brother of the 1st Duke and the 1st Marquess's nephew Richard Griffin, 3rd Baron Braybrooke. The Foreign Secretary (from 1938 to 1940) Lord Halifax was also related to the family, through his mother Lady Agnes Elizabeth Courtenay, daughter of Lady Elizabeth Fortescue, herself daughter of Hester Grenville, daughter of George Grenville, the prime minister.

George Nugent-Temple-Grenville undertook the Grand Tour in 1774. In 1775 he married a Catholic heiress Mary Nugent, who had an income of £14,000 a year. He was created 1st Marquess of Buckingham in 1784 by King George III. On the death in 1788 of the Marquess's father-in-law Robert Nugent, 1st Earl Nugent he inherited the Earl's Irish (8,900 acres (3,600 ha)) and Cornish estates.

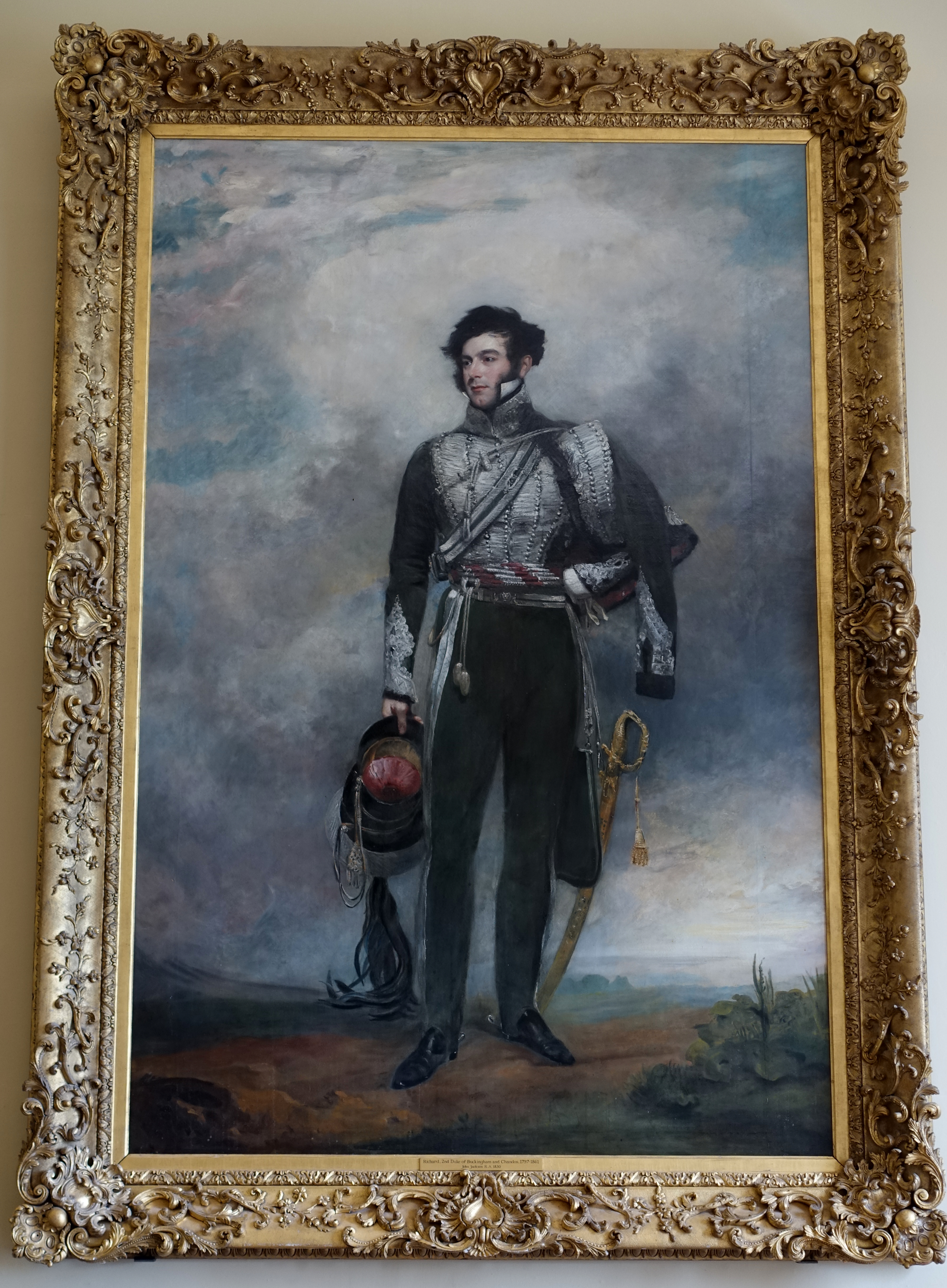
The 2nd Duke of Buckingham & Chandos, owned Stowe 1839–1861

The 2nd Marquess of Buckingham married in 1796 Anna Eliza Brydges the daughter and heiress of James Brydges, 3rd Duke of Chandos who had died in 1789. He thus acquired this wife's estates in Hampshire and Middlesex. Up until 1822 the family had been staunch Whigs, but in order to obtain the long sought dukedom the family became Tories. The dukedom was bestowed in 1822 by King George IV on Richard Temple-Nugent-Brydges-Chandos-Grenville 2nd Marquess who became the 1st Duke of Buckingham and Chandos. The deal was to support the then prime minister Lord Liverpool's administration. The family spent a great deal of money to control several rotten boroughs, including Old Sarum, whose M.P.s switch their support to the Prime Minister, although the Reform Act 1832 would end this practice. The 1st Duke was a colonel in the Royal Buckinghamshire Militia (King's Own), he led his battalion in 1814 to France under the command of the Duke of Wellington.

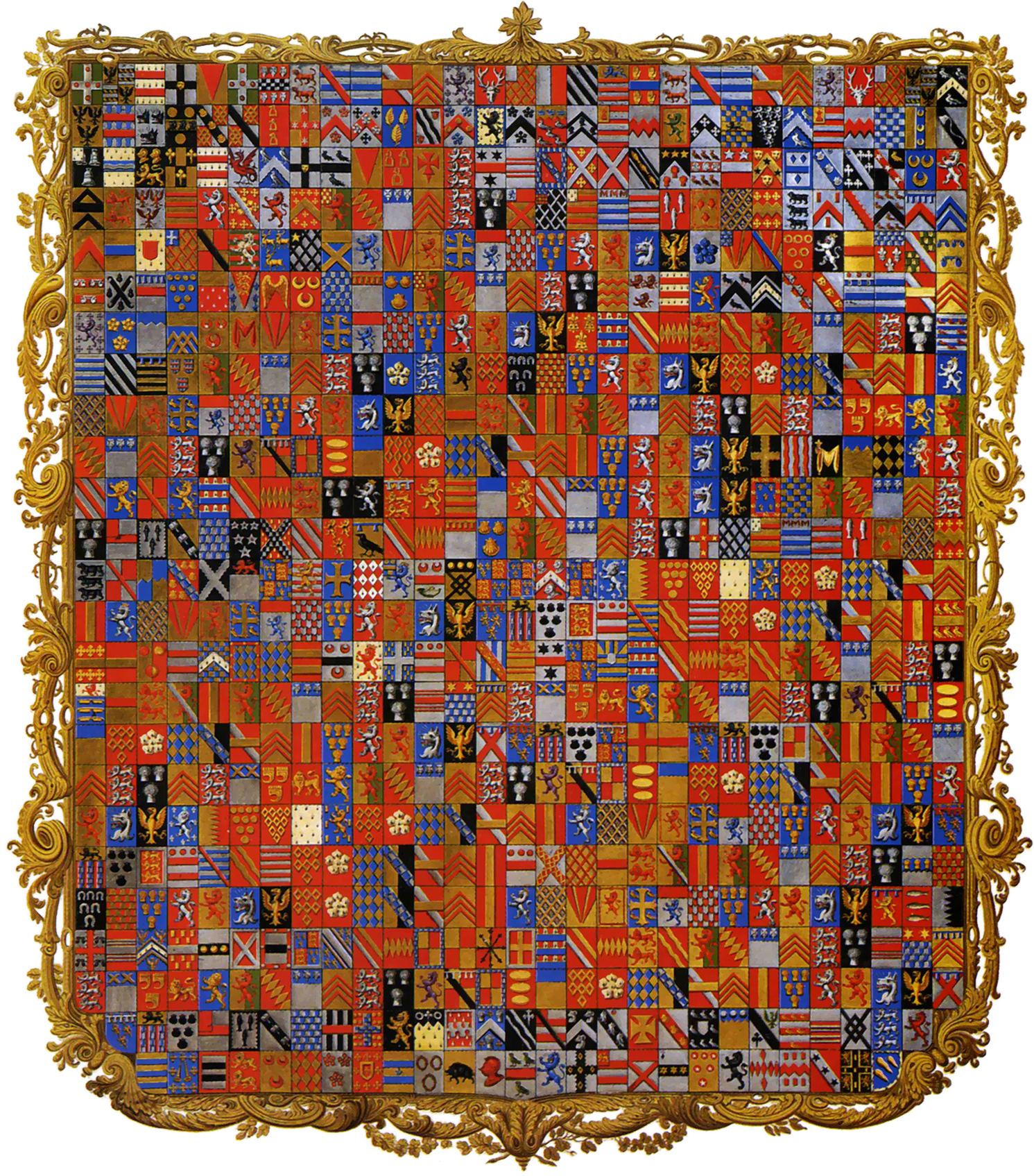
The Grenville Armorial was produced between 1822 and 1839 for Richard Temple-Grenville, Marquess of Chandos, the son of the first Duke of Buckingham and Chandos. The armorial shows 719 quarterings of the family.

The 2nd Duke through his mother Anna was descended from the House of Plantagenet and was an active member of the Royal Buckinghamshire Yeomanry. His support of which added to the debts of £1,464,959 (well over £100,000,000 in 2003 terms) he had accrued by 1845. He was called the Greatest Debtor in the world. The Duke left to live abroad in August 1847 to escape his creditors. That year saw the sale of the family's London home Buckingham House in Pall Mall. In March 1848 the family estates in Ireland, Hampshire, Gloucestershire, Somerset, Cornwall, Oxfordshire, Northamptonshire & Middlesex some 36,000 acres (15,000 ha) of land, were sold. Followed by the most valuable of the paintings, furniture, the household silver was sold in 836 lots over a week in September, and other art works at Stowe, the over 21,000 bottles of wine and over 500 of spirits in the wine cellars below the Marble Saloon, were all sold from 15 August to 7 October 1848 by Christie's. The auction was held in The State Dining Room, but only raised £75,400. At the end of the sales the estate had contracted to the core 10,000 acres (4,000 ha) in Buckinghamshire. The garden staff were cut from 40 to 4. In January 1849 there was a 24-day sale at Sotheby's of the books from the library, that raised £10,356.

Richard Temple-Nugent-Brydges-Chandos-Grenville, 3rd Duke of Buckingham and Chandos (10 September 1823 – 26 March 1889), usually shortened to Richard Temple-Grenville, was a British statesman of the 19th century, and a close friend and subordinate of Benjamin Disraeli. He was styled Marquess of Chandos until the death of his father in 1861.

With the death of the third Duke of Buckingham and Chandos in 1889, there remained no heirs-male to the dukedom, so it became extinct. After which ownership of the estate was separated from the title Earl Temple of Stowe which passed by special remainder in the letters patent, creating it through the female line to a nephew of the 3rd Duke William Temple-Gore-Langton, the son of Lady Anna Eliza Mary Grenville sister of the 3rd Duke. The fall of the family engendered Lord Rosebery's comment "The glories of the House, built up with so much care and persistence, vanished like a snow wreath".

After the death of her father the 3rd Duke, Lady Mary Morgan-Grenville tried to sell house and estate for £200,000, but nobody wished to buy it. It was then rented until 1894 after which the house remained unoccupied until 1901 when Lady Mary returned as a widow, her husband Major Luis Morgan-Grenville having died in 1896 and she lived in the house until 1908 when she passed it onto her unmarried son as he came of age at 21.

The last inheritor of the estate, Rev. Luis C.F.T. Morgan-Grenville, due to prodigious debts, sold the house, gardens and part of the park in 1921 to a Mr Harry Shaw for £50,000 who intended to present the house to the nation. But being unable to pay for an endowment to maintain the building it was sold again in 1922 to the governors of what became Stowe School. This opened on 11 May 1923. The rest of the estate was sold as separate lots. Clough Williams-Ellis purchased the Grand Avenue to prevent its felling to create building plots. Then, in 1924, a group of 106 Old Etonians purchased the Avenue from Williams-Ellis, before gifting the Avenue's title deeds to the newly founded Stowe School as a first anniversary gift. The gardens remained in the ownership of the School until 1989 when an anonymous donor provided funds for an endowment and the National Trust assumed ownership. In 1997 the ownership of the house passed to the Stowe House Preservation Trust, the major aim of which is to restore the building.

=== Line of inheritance ===
The propensity to marry heiresses is shown by the family name being changed to Temple-Nugent-Brydges-Chandos-Grenville by the late 18th century. The following family members were the owners of the estate and creators of the house and gardens as they now exist:

- Peter Temple, ?-1578: leased the estate in 1571.
- John Temple, 1542–1603: first inherits the lease from his father Peter then purchased the estate in 1589.
- Sir Thomas Temple, 1567 – c. 1637: 1st Baronet, he inherited from his father John.
- Sir Peter Temple, 1592–1653: 2nd Baronet, he was given the estate by his father the 1st Baronet in 1630. He kept the house but became a bankrupt.
- Sir Richard Temple, 1634–1697: 3rd Baronet, he inherited the estate from his father, the 2nd Baronet.
- Richard Temple, 1st Viscount Cobham, 1675–1749: 4th Baronet, later Baron Cobham and finally Viscount Cobham, he inherited from his father, the 3rd Baronet.
- Richard Grenville-Temple, 1711–1779: 2nd Earl Temple, he inherited from his uncle, Viscount Cobham.
- George Nugent-Temple-Grenville, 1753–1813: 1st Marquess of Buckingham, he inherited from his uncle, the 2nd Earl Temple.
- Richard Temple-Nugent-Brydges-Chandos-Grenville, 1776–1839: 2nd Marquess of Buckingham later 1st Duke of Buckingham & Chandos, he inherited from his father, the 1st Marquess of Buckingham.
- Richard Plantagenet Temple-Nugent-Brydges-Chandos-Grenville, 1797–1861: 2nd Duke of Buckingham & Chandos, he inherited from his father, the 1st Duke.
- Richard Plantagenet Campbell Temple-Nugent-Brydges-Chandos-Grenville, 1823–1889: 3rd Duke of Buckingham & Chandos, he inherited from his father, the 2nd Duke.
- Lady Mary Morgan-Grenville, 1852–1944: 11th Lady Kinloss, she inherited from her father, the 3rd Duke.
- Richard G. Morgan-Grenville, 1887–1914: was given the estate in 1908 by his mother Lady Kinloss. He was killed fighting in the Great War, at Ploegsteert Wood.
- Reverend Luis C.F.T. Morgan-Grenville, 1889–1944: inherited the estate on the death of his brother Richard, and sold it in 1921.

=== Gallery of the main creators of Stowe ===
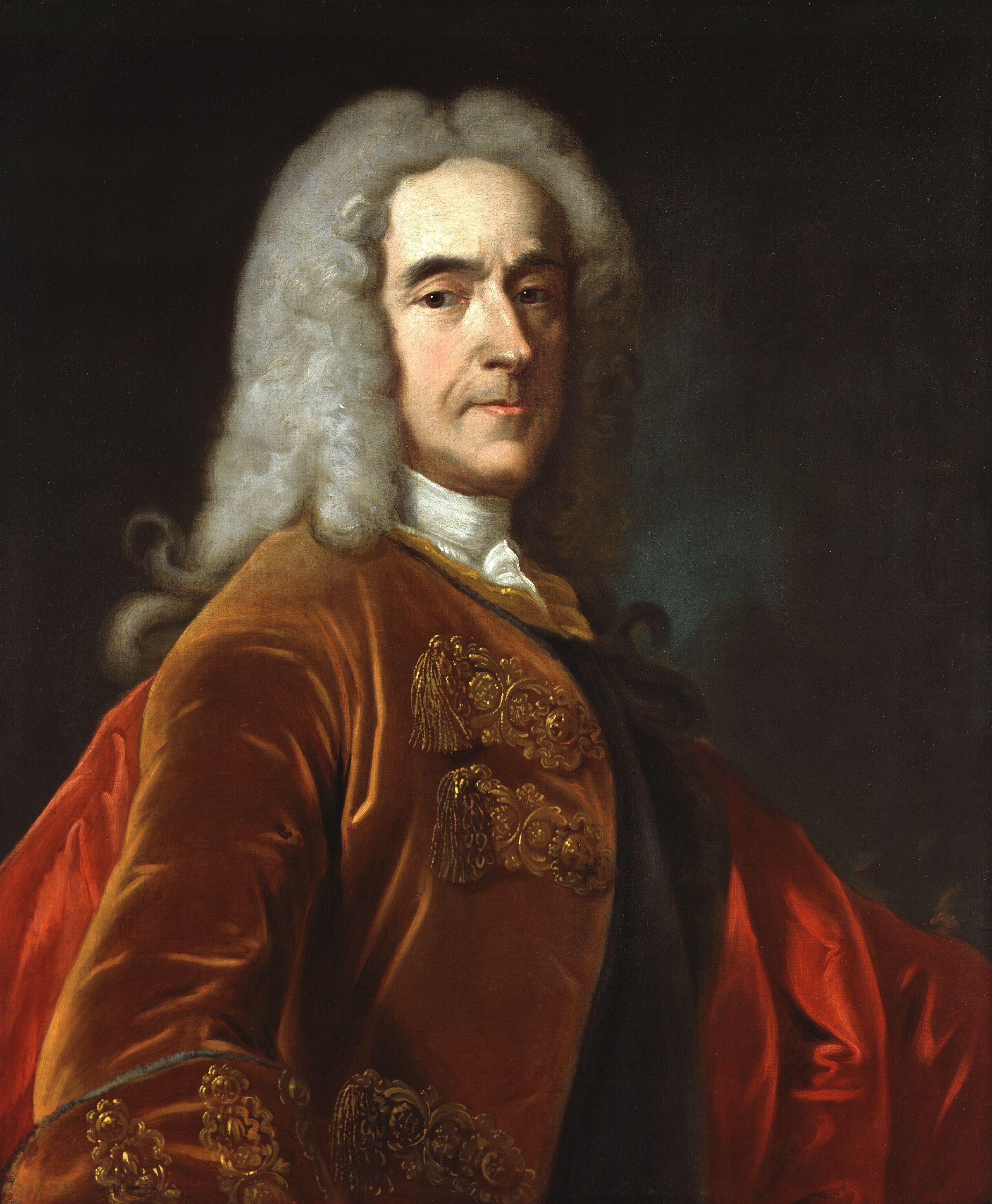
Viscount Cobham, owned Stowe 1697-1749

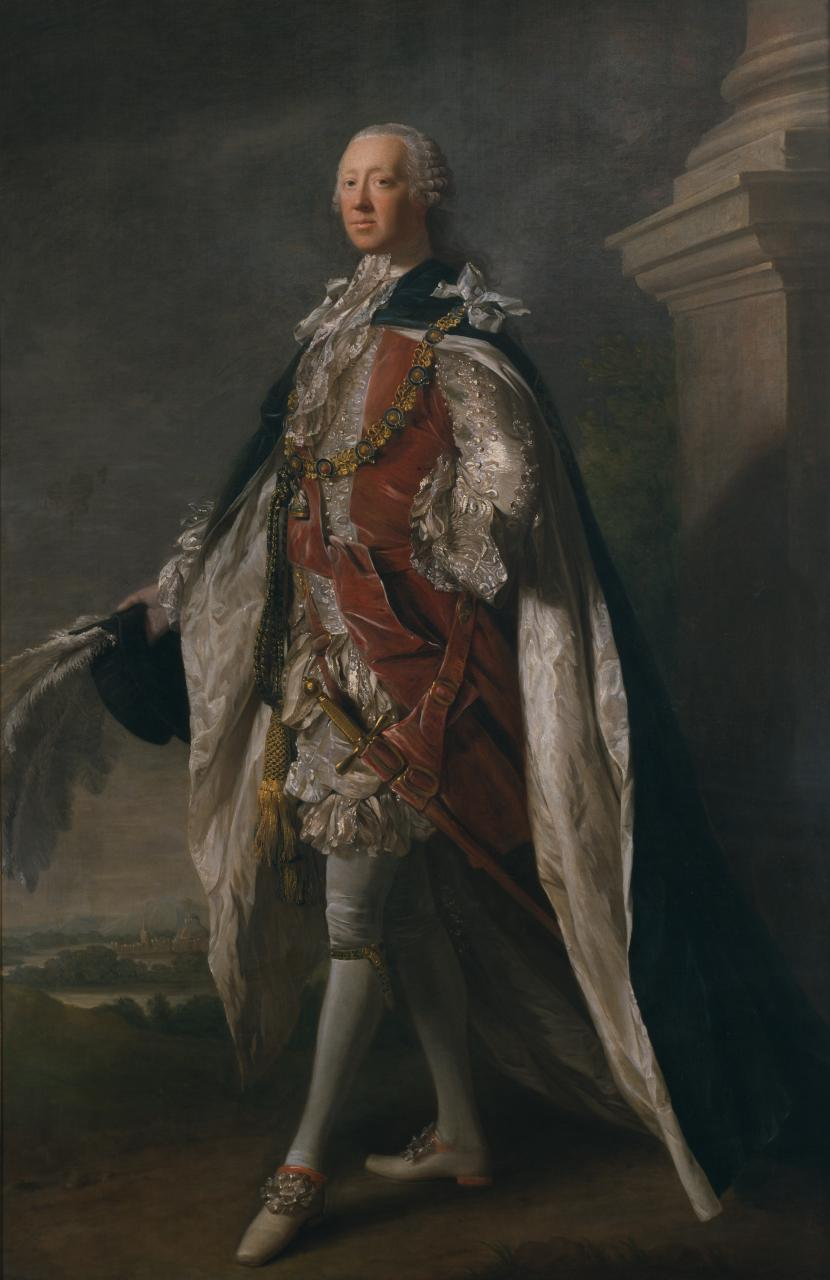
2nd Earl Temple, owned Stowe 1749-1779

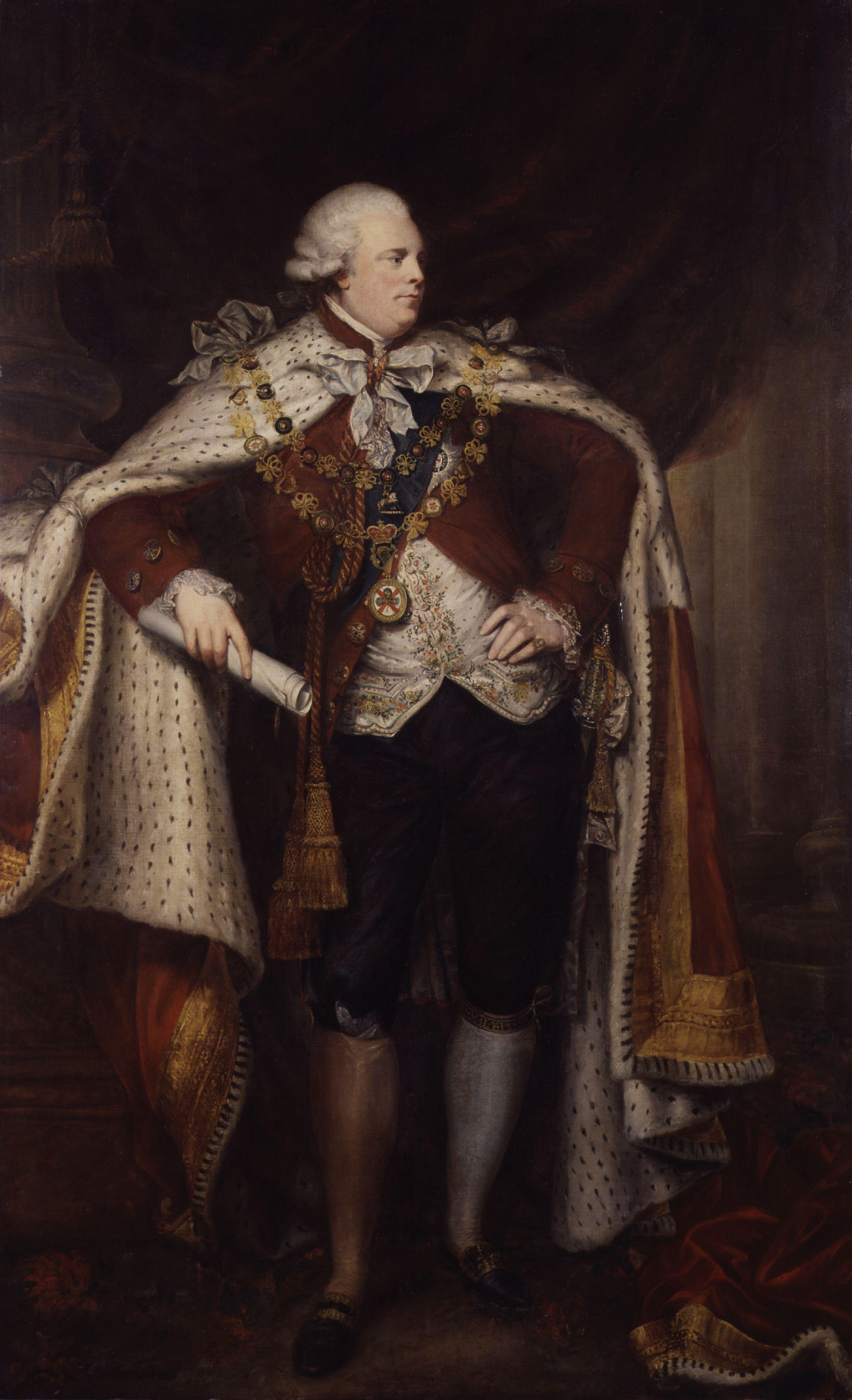
1st Marquess of Buckingham, owned Stowe 1779-1813

== The restoration of the house and gardens ==
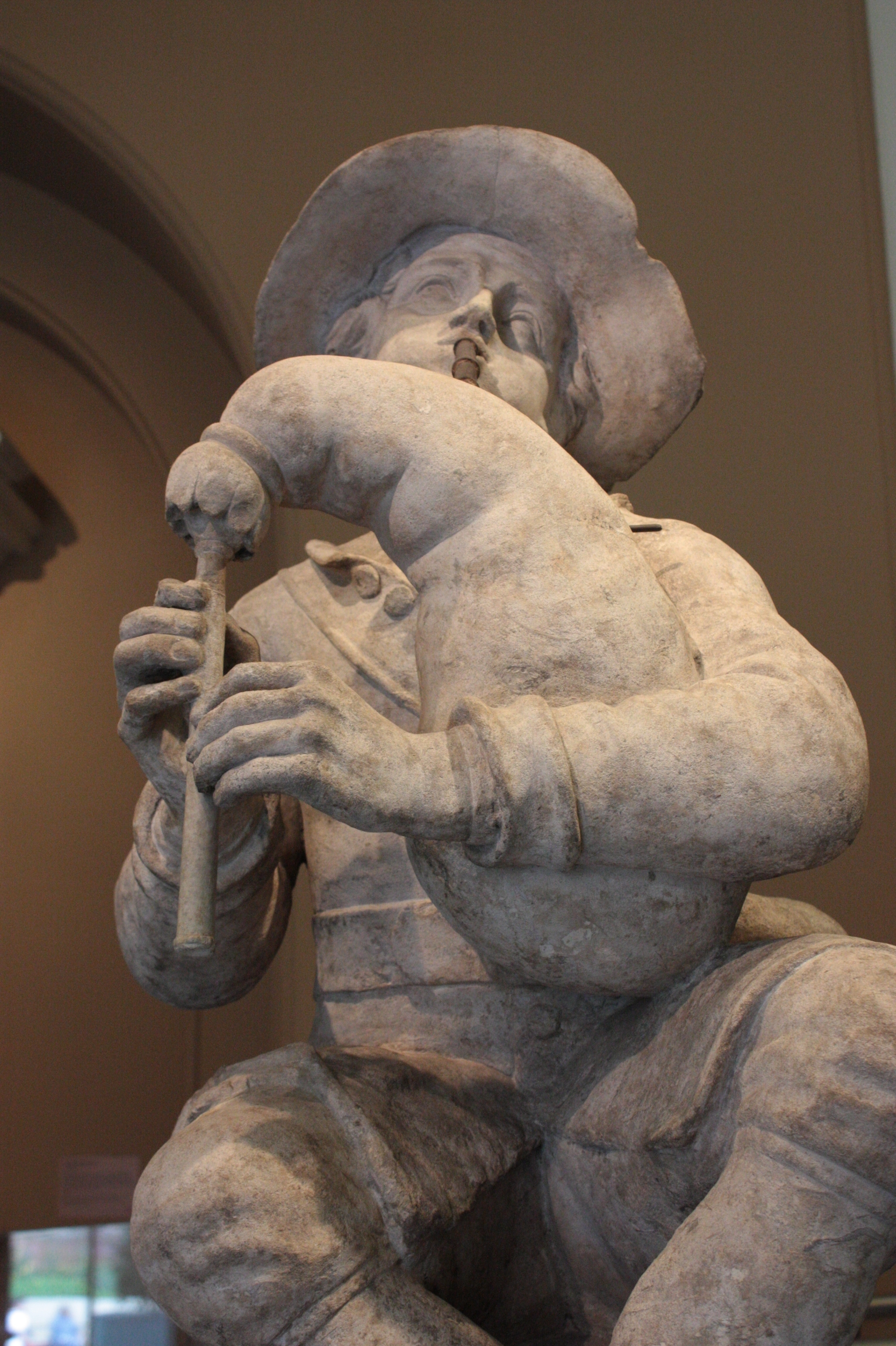
Boy with Bagpipes by Caius Gabriel Cibber c.1680, formerly in the gardens at Stowe, now in the Victoria and Albert Museum

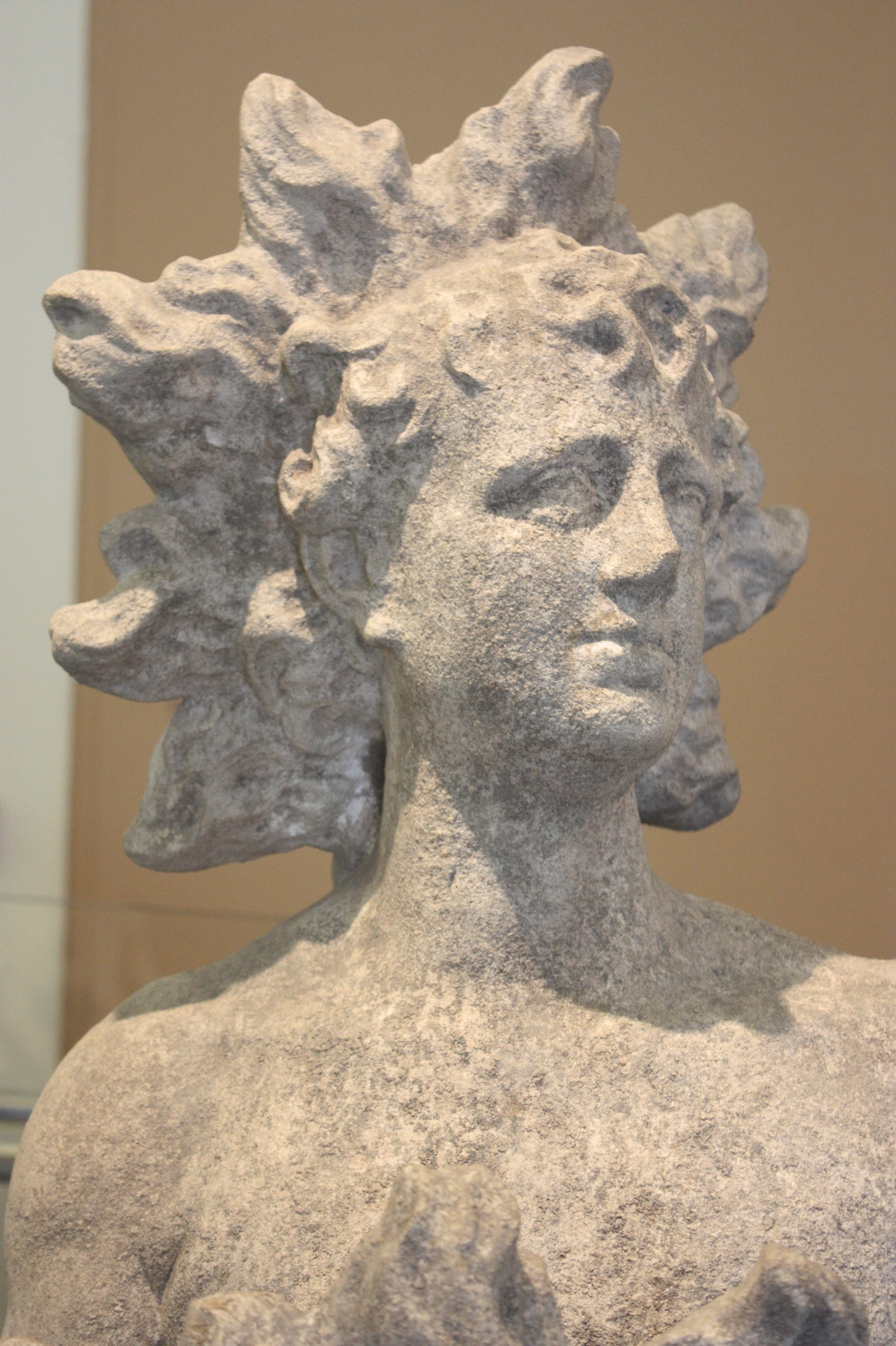
Sunna by John Michael Rysbrack, 1728, formerly in the gardens at Stowe, now in the Victoria and Albert Museum

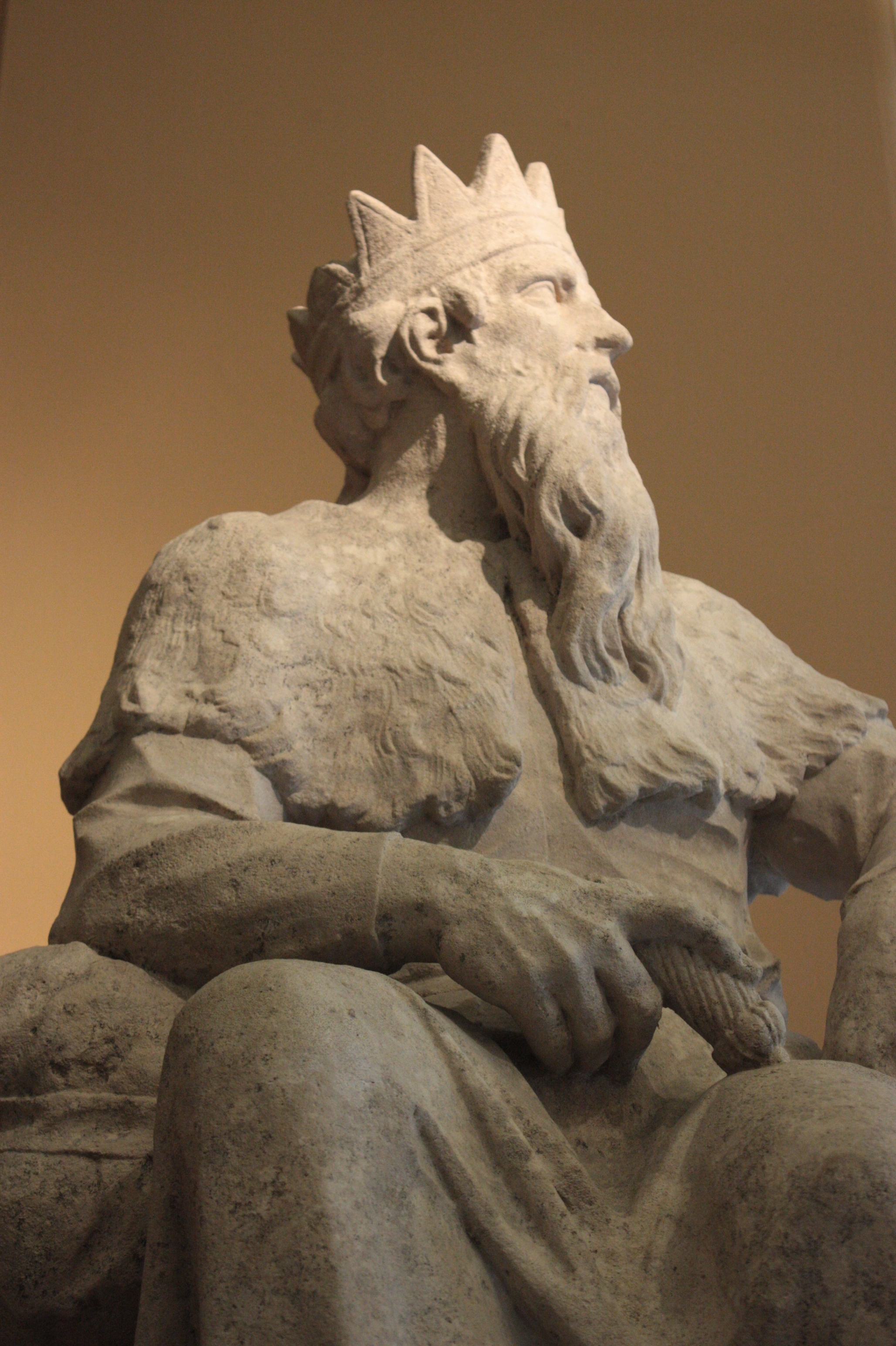
Thuner by John Michael Rysbrack, 1728, formerly in the gardens at Stowe, now in the Victoria and Albert Museum

Since the 1848 sale, the maintenance of the house and gardens was neglected. Although Stowe's future was given reprieve in 1923, when it was repurposed as a school, they were unable to maintain the gardens and park. Though the school tried its best it was obvious by the 1980s that a major restoration was needed. In 1990, the National Trust became responsible for the gardens.

On taking over ownership of the gardens the National Trust commissioned a survey on which to base a restoration strategy. Individual trees, boundaries, buildings, lakes, paths and fences were mapped. The first principle was to keep all buildings and planted features that were in existence by the time the last plan of the garden in 1843 was created. Another was to restore the main views and axes of the garden. The process was greatly helped by the Stowe Papers, some 350,000 documents that are now in the collection of the Huntington Library in California, containing extensive and detailed information on the creation of both the house and gardens.

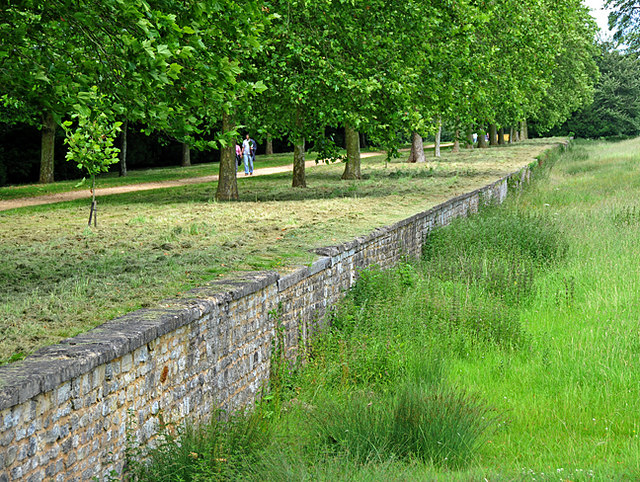
The ha-ha surrounding the gardens

The first large-scale operation was to dredge the lakes and other water features. 320,000 tonnes of silt had to be removed. The wall of the ha-ha had largely collapsed and had to be rebuilt by hand. It was also found that very few trees survived before the 3rd Duke's time; he had all the mature trees felled to sell for their timber in order to raise cash. There had been a few plantings of commercial softwood, including a spruce plantation on the site of the Saxon Deities (largely by John Michael Rysbrack placed 1728–1730). These were felled. Further thinning was carried out, including reopening views between the various buildings and monuments. Replanting of 20,000 trees and shrubs followed, using species present in the original garden. Paths which had become overgrown were re-excavated and eventually covered in gravel from local pits.

Over 100 pieces of statuary had been sold from the gardens in 1848, 1921 and 1922, so it was decided to replace them gradually with replicas as and when funds could be raised. In 1989–90 Peter Inskip assessed the condition of the buildings. Work on the restoration of the buildings, based on this survey, was then prioritised. The major restorations have been the Grenville Column (1991), the Temple of Ancient Virtue (1992), the Oxford Gates and Lodges (1994), the Temple of Venus (1995) and the Temple of Concord & Victory (1996). This last had been severely compromised when 16 columns had been removed to build the new school chapel in 1926. Replacement columns were carved and the building re-roofed at the cost of £1,300,000. The cost of this first stage was £10,000,000, the money coming from several sources: a public appeal, the Heritage Lottery Fund and grants from English Heritage as well as private donors and other grant-giving bodies. The restoration process adopted an approach where each building, or element of the gardens was informed by archaeology. In order to make informed decisions about what to restore and why, archaeological techniques such as geophysics, excavation, building recording and monitoring in the form of an archaeological watching brief were all utilised.

In 2002 the World Monuments Fund placed Stowe House on its List of Most Endangered Sites. The school had done its best to keep the house in good repair, including re-roofing the State Dining Room in 1990, repair of the north elevation of the West Pavilion in 1992 and the repair of the Marble Saloon's oculus skylight in 1994. On taking over ownership of the house in 1997, the Stowe House Preservation Trust commissioned a survey in order to scope the problem and come up with a restoration plan. The result was a six-phase plan, starting with the most urgent work. The estimated cost in 2002 for all six phases was nearly £40 million.

The phases are: Phase 1, the restoration of the North Front and Colonnades, started in the summer of 2000 and completed in July 2002, much of the money coming from the Heritage Lottery Fund, English Heritage, the Getty Grant Programme and the Shanks First Fund. Phase 2, the restoration of the Central Pavilion and South Portico, took place from July 2003 to July 2006, thanks to funding by an anonymous U.S. philanthropist; the interior of the Marble Saloon was also undertaken. Phase 3, the restoration of the South Front, commenced in the autumn of 2009 and has been divided into sub-phases A, The Large Library roof, facades and ceiling completed July 2010; B, The Eastern Pavilion roof, facades and garden, completed July 2010; C, The Western Pavilion roof, and facades; D, The State Dining room, roof, facades, ceiling and garden. If the funds could be raised it was hoped to complete Phase 3 in 2011 or 2012. Phase 4, the restoration of the West court and building range. Phase 5, the restoration of the Eastern court and building range. Phase 6, the restoration of the State Rooms (the Marble Saloon, Ante-Library and Large Library have been restored, as were the Music Room and Egyptian Hall in 2012, followed by the Blue Room in 2014, and the Grand Staircase in 2017, as of 2019 work is underway to restore the North Hall).

== Listed status ==
Stowe has one of the largest concentrations of Grade I listed buildings in England. There are Grade I listings in place for 27 separate structures. These account for nearly 0.5% of the approximately 9,000 grade I listings in England and Wales. The other historic buildings in the garden and park are listed grade II* or grade II. The extensive parks and gardens are listed Grade I on the Register of Historic Parks and Gardens.

Grade I listed buildings at Stowe House
- The house
- The arches at each end of the north front of the house
- Dido's Cave
- The equestrian statue of George I to the north of the house
- Lord Cobham's Column
- Queen Caroline's Monument
- The Boycott Pavilions
- The Cascade
- The Congreve Monument
- The Corinthian Arch
- The Doric Arch
- The Fane of Pastoral Poetry
- The Gothic Temple
- The Grenville Column
- The Hermitage
- The Lake Pavilions
- The Oxford Bridge
- The Oxford Gate
- The Palladian Bridge
- The Queen's Temple
- The Rotondo
- The Shell Bridge and Captain Cook's Monument
- The Temple of Ancient Virtue
- The Temple of British Worthies
- The Temple of Concord and Victory
- The Temple of Friendship
- The Temple of Venus
- The Wolfe Obelisk

== Notable visitors ==
British and foreign aristocrats and royalty frequently stayed at the house throughout the 18th and 19th centuries. In 1725 Charles Howard, 3rd Earl of Carlisle and his wife stayed for a fortnight. The 1730s and 1740s saw visits by Henrietta Howard, Countess of Suffolk, and William Pulteney, 1st Earl of Bath; Frederick, Prince of Wales, along with other friends of Lord Cobham (see the Temple of Friendship), were also frequent guests. In 1750, John Hervey, 1st Earl of Bristol attended a reception at the house. In 1754 Count Stanisław August Poniatowski (the future king of Poland) visited the gardens.

The 1760s saw two visits by Leopold III, Duke of Anhalt-Dessau, as part of his tours of English gardens in preparation for the creation of the Dessau-Wörlitz Garden Realm. 1768 saw the visit of King Christian VII of Denmark. In July 1770 there was a house party lasting several days whose guests included Princess Amelia, Horace Walpole, Lady Mary Coke and William Ponsonby, 2nd Earl of Bessborough. The Prince Regent (the future King George IV) came in 1805 and 1808. King Louis XVIII came in January 1808 for several days, his party including: the Count of Artois, Louis's brother and successor as king of France; the Duke of Orléans (who would be France's last ever king); and Louis Henri, Prince of Condé.

1810 saw the visit of King Gustav IV Adolf of Sweden. Tsar Alexander I of Russia visited in 1810 and in 1814 Grand Duke Michael Pavlovich of Russia also visited. 1816 saw a visit by Hermann Graf Pückler. The Graf, a famous travel writer from Upper Lusatia, was later elevated in the Prussian peerage as Hermann, Fürst von Pückler-Muskau. Then in 1818 Grand Duke Nicholas (the future Tsar of Russia) visited. The same year saw the first of many visits by William, Duke of Clarence (the future king of Great Britain and Ireland). Following King William IV's death, his widow Queen Adelaide stayed in 1840. That year also saw visits by Prince Adolphus, Duke of Cambridge and his son Prince George.

In 1843 there were several visits by German royalty, with the British-born Ernest Augustus, King of Hanover and his wife, Frederica of Mecklenburg-Strelitz, staying at the house. Later that year, both Crown Prince John of Saxony and Crown Prince Wilhelm of Prussia (later the first German Kaiser) would stay at Stowe. Queen Victoria and Prince Albert stayed at the house for several days in 1845. Due to financial problems, the family let the estate to the Prince Philippe, Count of Paris from 1889 to 1894. The Count died that year in the house; his body was laid in state in the Marble Saloon, during which period Albert Edward, Prince of Wales (the future King Edward VII), paid his respects.

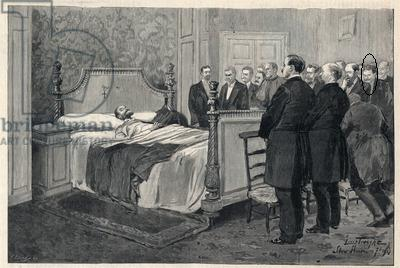
The Death of the Comte de Paris, Stowe House, England, 1894, by Louis Tinayre (1861–1941)

Famous non-royal visitors included: Alexander Pope, a frequent visitor from 1724 onwards, who, in 1726, visited in the company of Dean Jonathan Swift and John Gay; another writer and friend to Lord Cobham who visited in the 1720s was William Congreve; in 1730 James Thomson wrote the poem The Seasons after visiting the gardens; in 1732 Gilbert West, a nephew of Lord Cobham's, wrote his poem Stowe after visiting the gardens; 1750 saw the first of eight visits by the garden designer Sanderson Miller; the 1750s also saw visits by Jean-Jacques Rousseau; in 1770 the politician Thomas Whately wrote an extensive description of the gardens; François-Joseph Bélanger visited in 1777–1778 and drew the gardens.

In April 1786 John Adams (the future second president of the United States on tour with Thomas Jefferson – who would serve as his vice president before becoming president himself) visited Stowe and other notable houses in the area, after visiting them he wrote in his diary "Stowe, Hagley, and Blenheim, are superb; Woburn, Caversham, and the Leasowes are beautiful. Wotton is both great and elegant, though neglected". However, in his diary he was also damning about the means used to finance the large estates, and he did not think that the embellishments to the landscape, made by the owners of the great country houses, would suit the more rugged American countryside. The English composer William Crotch visited in 1805, as did Charles James Fox in the party that included the Prince Regent.

The house and grounds appear extensively in the music video for the 1981 song "Souvenir" by English electronic band Orchestral Manoeuvres in the Dark.

== Stowe on film ==
Stowe and its gardens have often been used as a location for films, music videos and television including: "Souvenir" (1981) by Orchestral Manoeuvres in the Dark; Indiana Jones and the Last Crusade (1989); the Inspector Morse episode "Ghost in the Machine" (1989); Vanity Fair (1998); The World Is Not Enough (1999); Kabhi Khushi Kabhie Gham (2001); Stardust (2007); The Wolfman (2010); X-Men: First Class (2011); Antiques Roadshow (2012); The First Georgians: The German Kings Who Made Britain (2014); Bill (2016); and The Crown (2017). The house and gardens have also featured in documentary films including: Simon Thurley's Buildings That Shaped Britain: The Country House (2006) and Jonathan Meades's Abroad Again (2007).
