= James Milnes Gaskell =

British politician

James Milnes Gaskell DL JP

Member of Parliament for Wenlock
- In office 1832–1868 Serving with George Weld-Forester
- Preceded by: Paul Thompson; George Weld-Forester
- Succeeded by: Alexander Hargreaves Brown; George Weld-Forester

Personal details
- Born: 19 October 1810
- Died: 5 February 1873 (aged 62) Norfolk Street, Park Lane, London
- Party: Conservative
- Spouse: Mary Wynn (after 1832)
- Relations: Daniel Gaskell (uncle)
- Children: 4
- Parent(s): Benjamin Gaskell; Mary Brandreth
- Education: Eton College
- Alma mater: Christ Church, Oxford

James Milnes Gaskell DL JP (19 October 1810 – 5 February 1873) was a British Conservative politician.

== Early life ==
James Milnes-Gaskell was born on 19 October 1810. He was the only child of Mary (née Brandreth) Gaskell (a daughter of Dr. Joseph Brandreth of Liverpool) and Benjamin Gaskell (1781–1856) of Thornes House, Wakefield, West Yorkshire and Clifton Hall, Lancashire. His father was a Whig MP for Maldon. His paternal grandparents were Daniel Gaskell and Hannah (née Noble) Gaskell (daughter of James Noble of Lancaster).

He was educated at Eton College and Christ Church, Oxford. His political interest may have been influenced by meeting lifelong friend William Ewart Gladstone as a school contemporary, and receiving visits during term from George Canning.

== Career ==
He was M.P. for Wenlock in Shropshire from 1832 until retiring in 1868. His uncle, Daniel Gaskell, also entered Parliament as first M.P. for Wakefield in 1832, at same general election as James. He served as a Lord of the Treasury from 1841 to 11 March 1846 under Sir Robert Peel's administration.

It was at Gaskell's then home in Tilney Street, London, in 1834, that Gladstone met his future wife, Catherine Glynne.

== Career ==
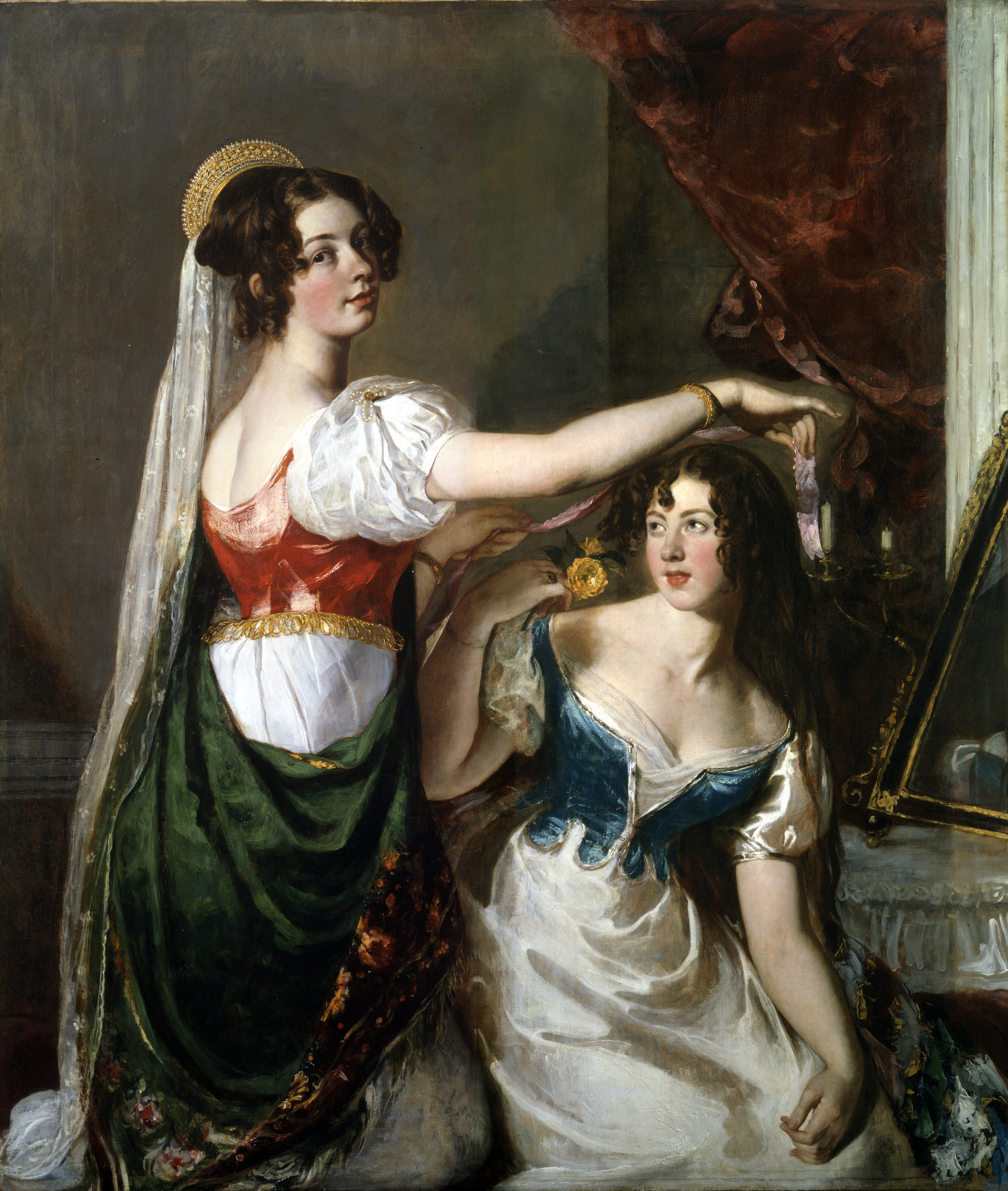
Portrait of his wife and her sister, entitled Preparing for a Fancy Dress Ball, by William Etty, 1833.

In 1832 he married Mary Williams-Wynn, daughter of the Rt Hon. Charles Williams-Wynn, (also a Member of Parliament) and Mary Cunliffe (a daughter of Sir Foster Cunliffe, 3rd Baronet). Together, they were the parents of two sons and two daughters, including:

- Isabel Milnes Gaskell (c. 1834–c. 1916), who married the Rev. Fitzgerald Wintour.
- Charles Milnes Gaskell (1842–1919), a Liberal MP who married Lady Catherine Henrietta Wallop, daughter of the 5th Earl of Portsmouth in 1876.

It was from his wife's cousin, Sir Watkin Williams-Wynn, that Gaskell bought in 1857 the site of Wenlock Priory, whose ruins he restored and whose Prior's Lodge he made into a family home.

He died at 28 Norfolk Street, Park Lane, London on 5 February 1873, aged sixty-two, and was buried in the parish churchyard at Much Wenlock.

=== Descendants ===
Through his daughter Isabel, he was a grandfather of Maj.-Gen. Fitzgerald Wintour (himself the grandfather of Vogue editor Anna Wintour).

Parliament of the United Kingdom
Preceded by Paul Thompson; George Weld-Forester	Member of Parliament for Wenlock; 1832–1868; With: George Weld-Forester	Succeeded by Alexander Hargreaves Brown; George Weld-Forester
Political offices
Preceded by Thomas Wyse; Henry Tufnell; Edward Horsman; William Francis Cowper	Junior Lord of the Treasury; 1841–1846	Succeeded by Swynford Carnegie; Ralph Neville
