= Preparing for a Fancy Dress Ball =

Painting by William Etty

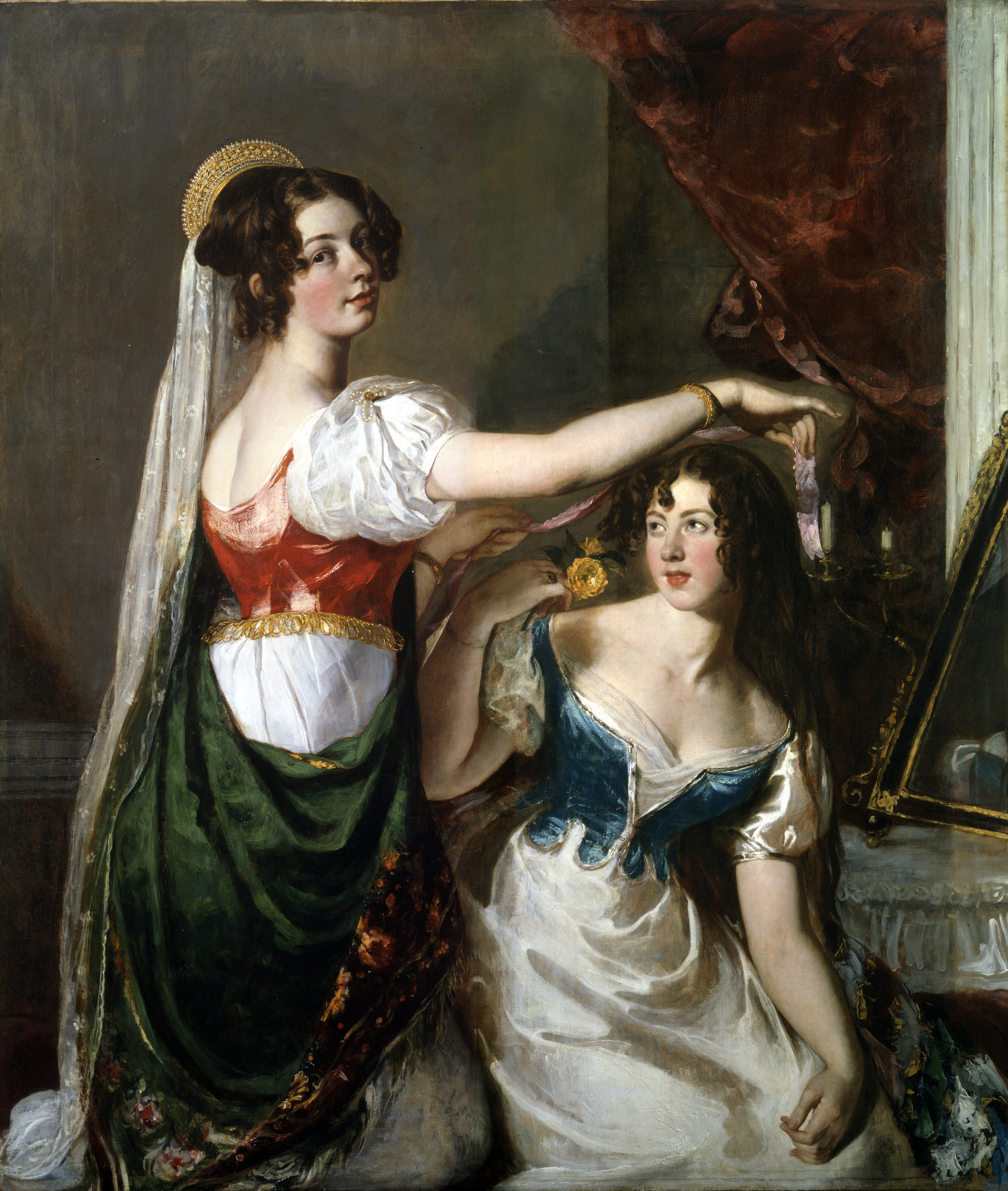
Preparing for a Fancy Dress Ball (1835)

Preparing for a Fancy Dress Ball, also known as The Misses Williams-Wynn, is an oil on canvas by the English artist William Etty, first exhibited in 1835. It measures 173 by 150 cm (68 by 59 in) and is now in the York Art Gallery. Although Etty was then known almost exclusively for history paintings featuring nude figures, he was commissioned in 1833 by Welsh Conservative politician Charles Watkin Williams-Wynn to paint a portrait of two of his daughters. Preparing for a Fancy Dress Ball shows Williams-Wynn's daughters, Charlotte and Mary, in lavish Italian-style costume: Charlotte, the eldest, is shown standing, helping the seated Mary decorate her hair with a ribbon and a rose. Etty put a good deal of effort into the piece and took much longer than usual to finish it.

The painting was completed for and exhibited at the Royal Academy Exhibition of 1835 at Somerset House. It was generally well received, even by critics usually hostile to Etty and his work. Preparing for a Fancy Dress Ball demonstrated that Etty was both capable of high-quality work and deserving of patronage by the English elite, and the success led to further commissions. The painting remained in the collection of Mary Williams-Wynn's descendants, and other than an 1849 retrospective exhibition, was not shown publicly for 160 years. A private collector purchased the piece from the Williams-Wynn family in 1982, where it remained until its 2009 acquisition by the York Art Gallery. It now forms part of a major collection of Etty's work there.

== Background ==
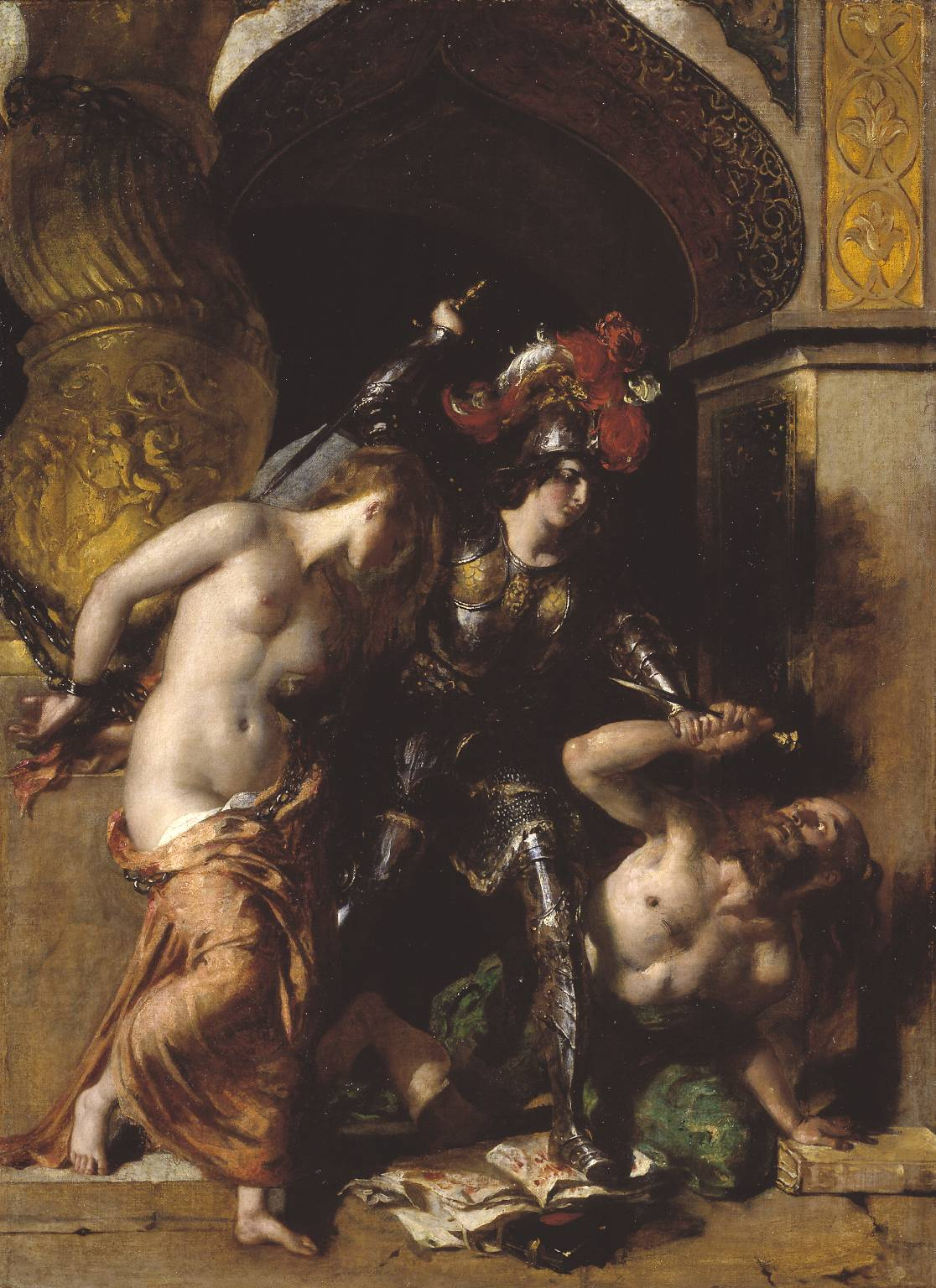
Britomart Redeems Faire Amoret, 1833. By the early 1830s Etty was notorious for his use of literary and mythological scenes as a pretext for the depiction of nudity.

William Etty, the son of a York baker and miller, began as an apprentice printer in Hull. On completing his seven-year apprenticeship he moved to London at the age of 18, with the intention of becoming a history painter in the tradition of the Old Masters. Strongly influenced by the works of Titian and Rubens, he submitted paintings to the Royal Academy of Arts and the British Institution, all of which were either rejected or received scant attention when exhibited.

In 1821 the Royal Academy accepted and exhibited one of Etty's works, The Arrival of Cleopatra in Cilicia (also known as The Triumph of Cleopatra). The painting was extremely well received, and many of Etty's fellow artists greatly admired him. He was elected a full Royal Academician in 1828, ahead of John Constable. He became well respected for his ability to capture flesh tones accurately in painting and for his fascination with contrasts in skin tones. Following the exhibition of Cleopatra, Etty tried over the next decade to replicate its success by painting nude figures in biblical, literary and mythological settings. Between 1820 and 1829 Etty exhibited 15 paintings, of which 14 depicted nude figures.

Some nudes by foreign artists were held in private English collections, but Britain had no tradition of nude painting, and the display and distribution of nude material to the public had been suppressed since the 1787 Proclamation for the Discouragement of Vice. Etty was the first British artist to specialise in the nude, and the reaction of the lower classes to these paintings caused concern throughout the 19th century. Many critics condemned his repeated depictions of female nudity as indecent, although his portraits of male nudes were generally well received. (Etty's male nude portraits were primarily of mythological heroes and classical combat, genres in which the depiction of male nudity was considered acceptable in England.) From 1832 onwards, needled by repeated attacks from the press, Etty remained a prominent painter of nudes but made conscious efforts to try to reflect moral lessons in his work.

=== Elizabeth Potts ===
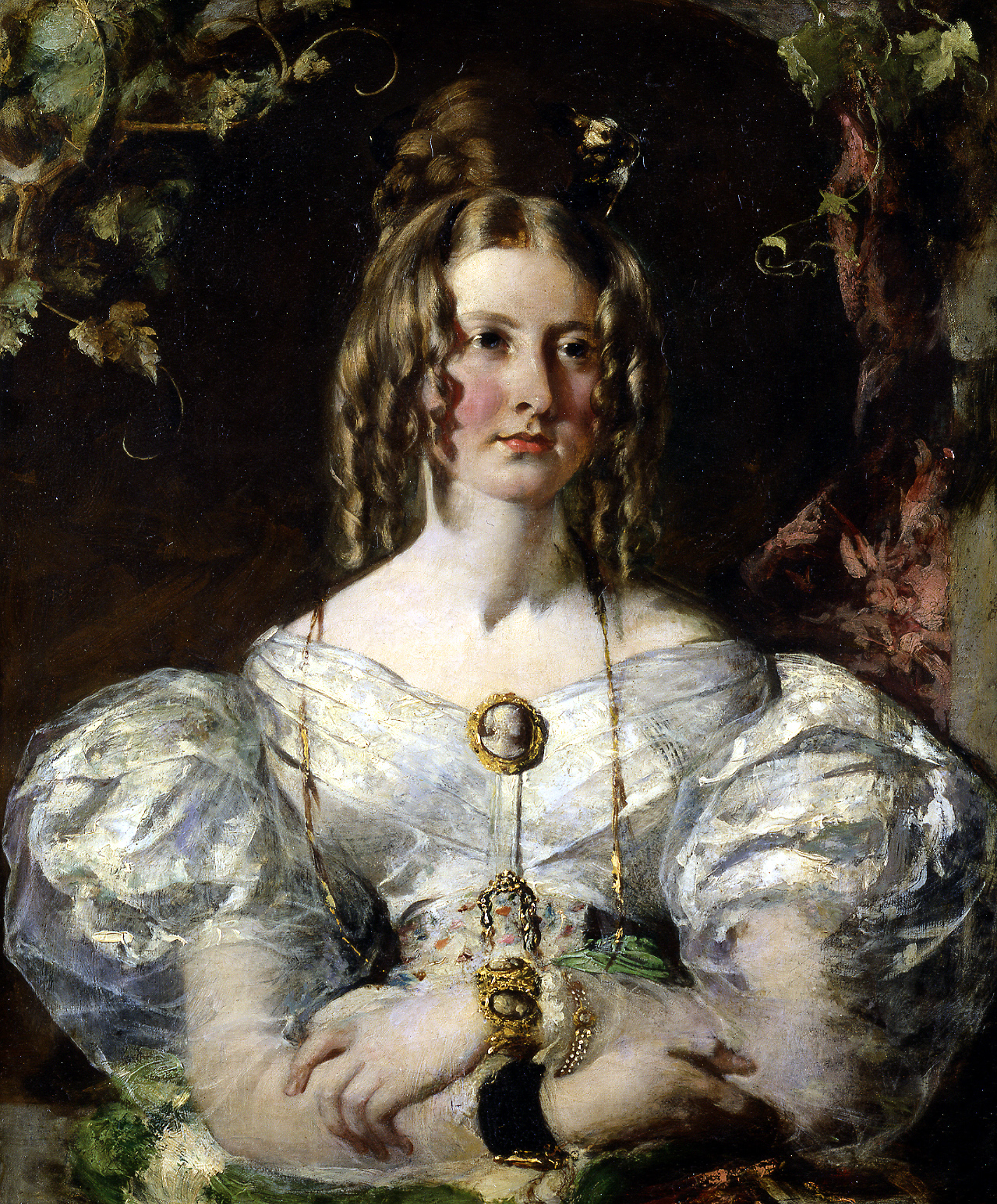
The exhibition of Elizabeth Potts drew criticism of Etty for his apparently abandoning history painting in favour of the more lucrative but less respected field of portraiture.

Although he was almost exclusively known at the time for painting nudes, Etty was commissioned in 1833 by Thomas Potts of Clapham Common to paint a portrait of his daughter Elizabeth. (Note: Thomas Potts was a friend of Etty's cousin Thomas Bodley. He was the early patron of William Edward Frost, who became one of Etty's most devoted imitators.) Potts paid him 65 guineas (£68.25; about £7,000 in 2025 terms) for the piece. Etty exhibited Elizabeth Potts at the Royal Academy Summer Exhibition of 1834 under the title of A Portrait, as the subject's mother requested her identity be kept secret. As he had been too ill to paint for much of the period preceding the exhibition he only exhibited one other picture there, The Cardinal.

Elizabeth Potts was poorly received by critics. Etty's admirers were angered by his apparent abandonment of history painting for the then poorly regarded field of portrait painting, while Etty's critics felt he had demonstrated that he did not have the technical skills to produce high quality portraits, and was simply trying to use his name to make money in the more lucrative field of portraiture. History paintings were generally sold at exhibition for no less than the asking price, and as a consequence often remained unsold. Portraits were commissioned by the subject or their family, providing a guaranteed source of income to the artist. History painting was much more highly regarded as an art form; portrait painting was seen as reflecting nature whereas history painting involved more creativity and also gave the artist the opportunity to tell moral lessons.

Etty retained close connections with York throughout his life. After Jonathan Martin's arson attack on York Minster in 1829 caused major damage, Etty was prominent in the effort to restore the building to its original state. One of his colleagues in that campaign was Welsh politician Charles Watkin Williams-Wynn, the long-serving Conservative Member of Parliament for Montgomeryshire.

== Composition ==
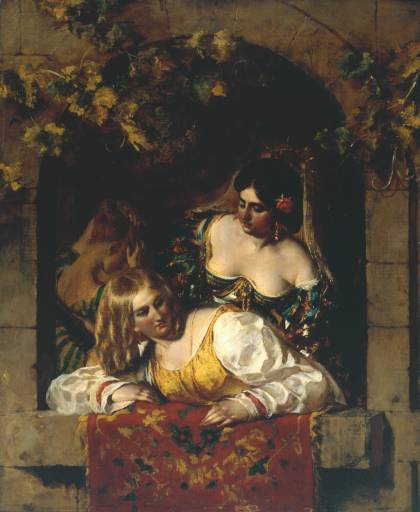
The costumes in Etty's Window in Venice During a Festa (1831) closely resemble those in Preparing for a Fancy Dress Ball.

In late 1833, Etty was commissioned by Williams-Wynn to paint a portrait of two of his seven children. Preparing for a Fancy Dress Ball depicts Williams-Wynn's daughters Charlotte and Mary, dressing up in lavish Italian-style costume. Although their dress is generally described as Italian, Dennis Farr's 1958 biography of Etty speculates that elements of the costumes were possibly intended to be Russian, based on Charlotte's headdress. The Italian-style clothing likely represents the high level of interest in Italian culture in early 19th-century England. The popularity of the style of music now known as bel canto, widely associated with Italy, was at its peak; likewise, the Italian plays of William Shakespeare had become extremely popular in the period. Etty, who had spent a good deal of time in Venice and other Italian cities, would have been very familiar with Italian clothing designs, and the costumes worn by the Williams-Wynn sisters closely resemble those of women in Venetian scenes painted by Etty, such as 1831's Window in Venice, During a Fiesta. As art historian Leonard Robinson points out, despite the title the sisters are not in fact shown preparing for the ball, but are fully dressed. The style of the work reflects that of Thomas Lawrence, who had been Etty's teacher in 1807–08, as well as that of Joshua Reynolds, of whom Etty was a great admirer and of whose works Etty had often made copies as an exercise.

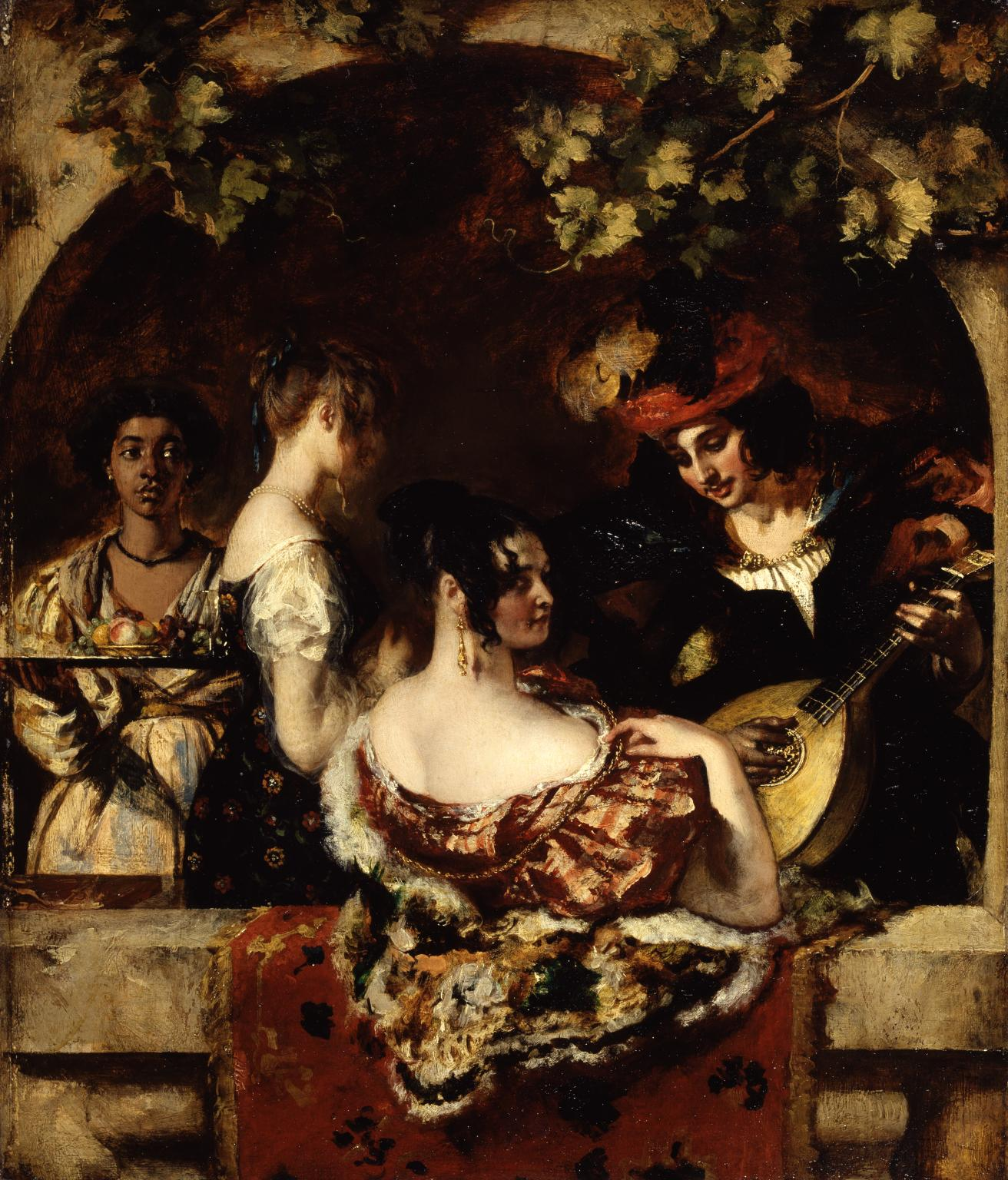
The composition of Preparing for a Fancy Dress Ball reflects that of Etty's The Lute Player, exhibited in early 1835.

The sisters are depicted in three-quarter length portrait; Charlotte, the eldest, stands and helps Mary, who is seated, to decorate her hair with a ribbon and a rose. Their arrangement is similar to the positioning of the central female figures of Etty's The Lute Player, painted around the same time, and Farr views Preparing for a Fancy Dress Ball as a direct continuation of the theme of that work. (The Lute Player was exhibited at the British Institution in early 1835 alongside Turner's The Burning of the Houses of Lords and Commons, and was somewhat overshadowed by it. The Spectator commented that in comparison to the vibrant colours of the Turner, The Lute Player looked "as if mud had been the vehicle of the pigment".)

The painting's depiction of preparation for a fancy dress party would have been familiar to Etty's generally wealthy audience. In both London and the English provincial cities, such balls and parties had become extremely fashionable by the 1830s. Though conservative in comparison to some costumes worn at contemporary fancy dress events, the richness of the design of the sisters' dress indicates the high status of the Williams-Wynn family in fashionable circles.

Preparing for a Fancy Dress Ball took Etty some time to complete in comparison to his usual work, and he apologized to the sisters for his "inability to render [repeated sittings for him] less tedious". He justified the slowness of the process by saying that he was not simply trying to capture the Williams-Wynn sisters' appearance, but "to make a fine work of Art as well as a resemblance".

I can only regret I had it not in my power to render it less tedious. A mere "likeness" may be manufactured in a few sittings. If it is desirable to make a fine work of Art as well as a resemblance, it becomes another affair. This has led me to extend my attention to it, beyond the limits usually assigned to Portrait. I am sure, if rightly viewed, the time will not be deemed uselessly employed. "What is worth doing at all, is worth doing well."—"Whatsoever thy hand findeth to do, do it with all thy might!"

— From a letter from William Etty to the Williams-Wynn family on the occasion of the sisters' last sitting for Preparing for a Fancy Dress Ball.

== Reception ==
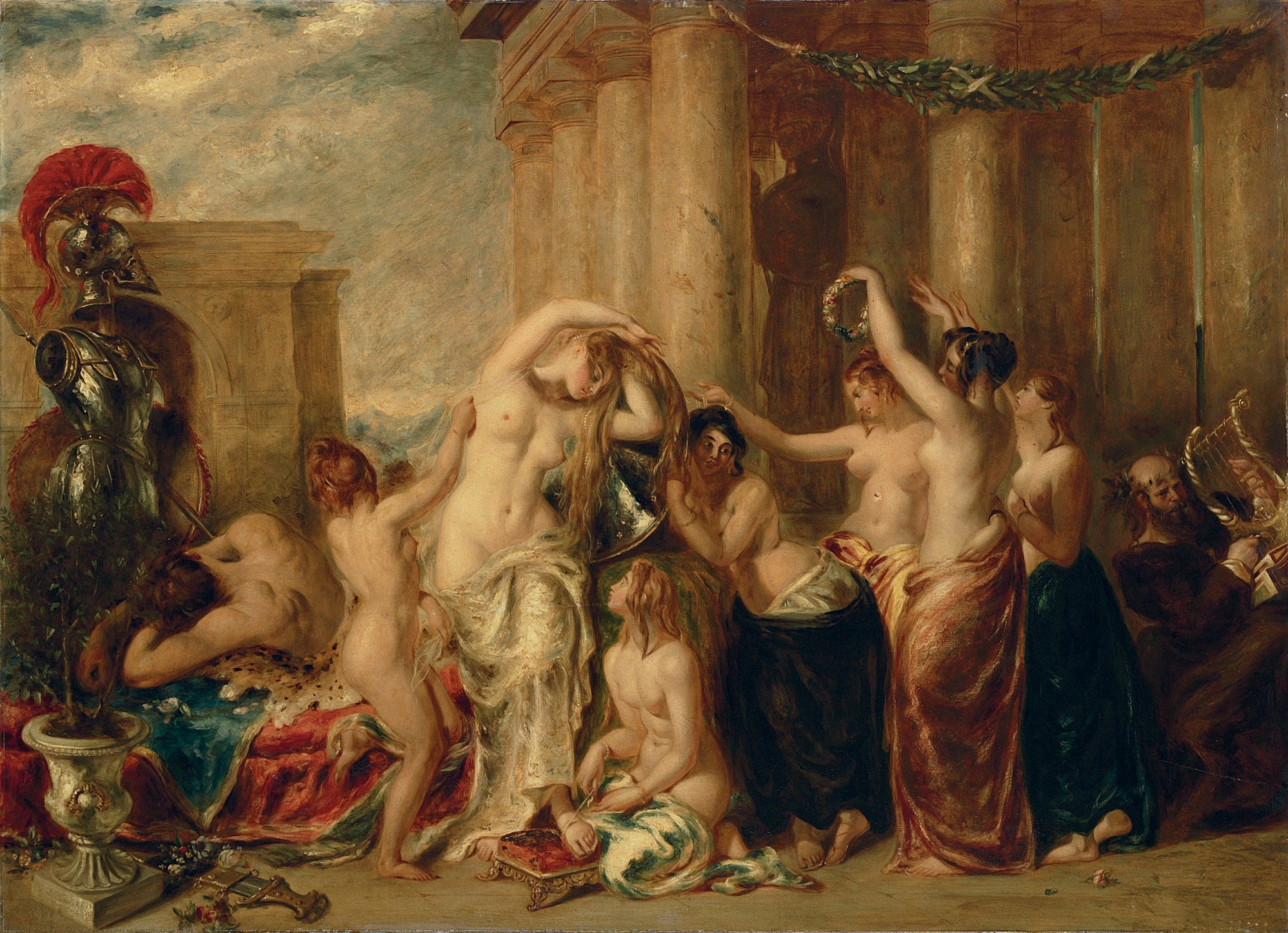
Venus and her Satellites was exhibited alongside Preparing for a Fancy Dress Ball in 1835.

Preparing for a Fancy Dress Ball was one of eight works exhibited by Etty at the 1835 Royal Academy Summer Exhibition, the others being The Bridge of Sighs, Phaedria and Cymochles on the Idle Lake, Study from a Young Lady: A York Beauty, Study of the Head of a Youth, Venus and her Satellites, The Warrior Arming and Wood Nymphs Sleeping: Satyr Bringing Flowers. Art historian Sarah Burnage believes Etty's choice of Venus and her Satellites may have been to draw attention to similarities with Preparing for a Fancy Dress Ball and possibly to link the Williams-Wynn sisters' beauty with the legendary Venus.

Reviewers, even those usually hostile to Etty, were generally positive about the work, and towards Etty's demonstration of his ability to paint a major piece depicting visual matter that did not depend on nudity or sensuality. Leigh Hunt's London Journal noted that they were "glad to see him turn his abilities into a channel acknowledgedly more profitable than others are apt to be, and we heartily wish him success in it"; the same reviewer did, however, savagely criticise Venus and her Satellites for its gratuitous nudity and a "total absence of soul".

== Legacy ==
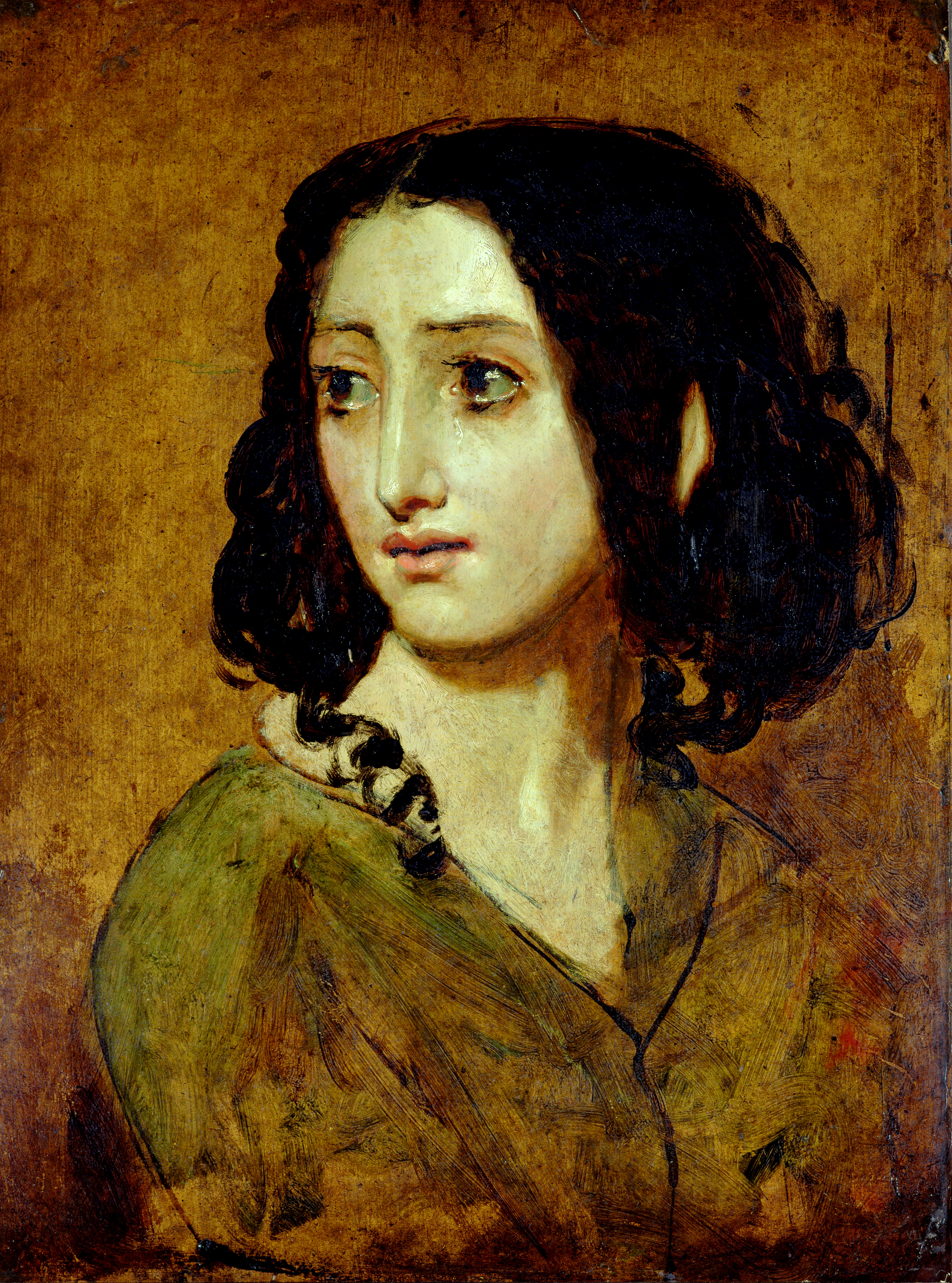
Portrait of Mlle Rachel, William Etty, c. 1841. Etty painted portraits throughout his life but few were publicly exhibited.

Although Etty painted many private portraits of his friends and acquaintances, he produced very few publicly exhibited portraits, fewer than 30 of which were shown during his lifetime. Portraiture was seen as a vulgar and generally worthless form of painting throughout much of the 19th century, and portrait painters continued to be disparaged as a greedy and unimaginative group who survived by feeding the vanity of the emerging middle class. Other than Preparing for a Fancy Dress Ball, critics generally disliked his portraits, preferring his history paintings in spite of reservations over his depictions of nudity. Preparing for a Fancy Dress Ball did, however, serve as an indication that Etty could successfully paint works as commissions for the English elite, boosting his status and leading to further commissions. Etty died in November 1849 and soon fell from fashion; by the late 19th century the cost of all his paintings had fallen below their original prices. Charlotte Williams-Wynn became a noted letter writer and diarist; Mary Williams-Wynn married Member of Parliament James Milnes Gaskell. Both Charlotte and Mary died in April 1869.

Preparing for a Fancy Dress Ball was exhibited in a major retrospective of Etty's works at the Royal Society of Arts in June 1849, but after that was not exhibited publicly for 160 years. Charlotte Williams-Wynn had died childless, and the painting was inherited by the family of Mary Williams-Wynn. In 1982 it was sold to a private collector by Mary Williams-Wynn's great-granddaughter Mrs Lewis Motley. The York Art Gallery purchased the work in 2009 for £120,000 with the assistance of the Art Fund and the V&A/MLA Purchase Grant Fund, and it formed part of a major exhibition of Etty's work at the York Art Gallery in 2011–12.
