= Charlotte Williams-Wynn =

Charlotte Williams-Wynn may refer to:

- Charlotte Williams-Wynn (aristocrat) (1754–1830), British aristocrat, daughter of Prime Minister George Grenville
- Charlotte Williams-Wynn (diarist) (1807–1869), her granddaughter, British letter-writer and diarist
