= Pauline Savari =

French opera singer (1859–1907)

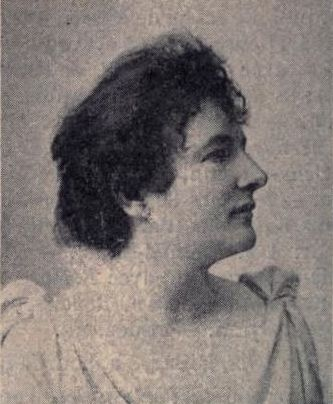
- Born: 10 January 1859; Viarmes, France
- Died: 10 January 1907 (aged 48); Auteuil, France
- Occupations: Author; novelist; journalist; playwright; stage actress; opera singer; feminist
- Spouse: Louis Étienne Baudier de Royaumont
- Children: Louis; Philippe

Pauline Savari (10 January 1859 – 10 January 1907) was a French novelist, dramatist, journalist, stage actress, opera singer and feminist.

== Personal life ==
Savari married Louis Étienne Baudier de Royaumont (1854–1918), with whom she had two sons: Louis and Philippe Baudier de Royaumont. Philippe married Suzanne Leloir, daughter of Maurice Leloir in 1912, and died fighting for France in 1916.

== Career ==
Savari began her career as a journalist in 1887. She wrote articles for numerous journals, including Gil Blas, Le Figaro, Le Don Quichotte, and La France. Savari also wrote many plays and novels. At the same time, Savari had a career on stage as both an actress and an opera singer, including a leading role in Alceste by Gluck. She was a pupil and friend of the noted French actress Marie Léonide Charvin (known as Agar). In 1891 Savari founded artistic evenings at the Galerie Vivienne. In 1893 Savari applied to become a member of the Académie française. Her application was denied because she was a woman. In 1894 Savari became the editor of the journal Polymnia.

In 1895 Savari tried to persuade the municipal council of Paris to create a commemorative plaque for Marguerite Porete, a French medieval mystic, who was burnt at the stake for heresy in Paris in 1310, after she refused to refusing to remove her book, The Mirror of Simple Souls, from circulation or to recant her views.

Savari was a noted feminist, and founder and chair of the Fédération française des sociétés féministes, a union of professional French women. The Fédération was concerned with the issues of equal work and equal pay for women. Savari was especially concerned to secure safe working conditions.

With aims driven by her practical feminism and her desire to educate the public about women's rights and their industry and economic contributions, Savari organised the exposition internationale des arts et métiers féminins and its associated conference the Congrès du travail, in Paris over four months from 25 June to 30 October 1902. In 1903 Savari was the editor of the journal L'Ouvrière. She also founded the journal Le Berceau, which was concerned with the protection of mothers and children.

== Novels ==
- 1882: Sacré Cosaque!

== Theatre ==
As author

- 1889: Tous journalistes!
- 1890: Divorce impérial
- 1891: Oh la bête!
- 1901: Maternité
- 1901: Le Bon Anarchiste
- 1901: Les Barbares sont à nos portes
- 1901: Mademoiselle se marie

As actor

- 1891: Celle qu'on n'épouse pas, by Paul Alexis

== Opera ==
- 1892: Siegfried, only the last act, at the Théâtre Moderne
- 1894: Alceste by Gluck at the Théâtre Moncey
- 1897: Le Passant by Émile Paladilhe at the Théâtre Mondain
