= Charlotte Williams-Wynn (diarist) =

English letter-writer and diarist

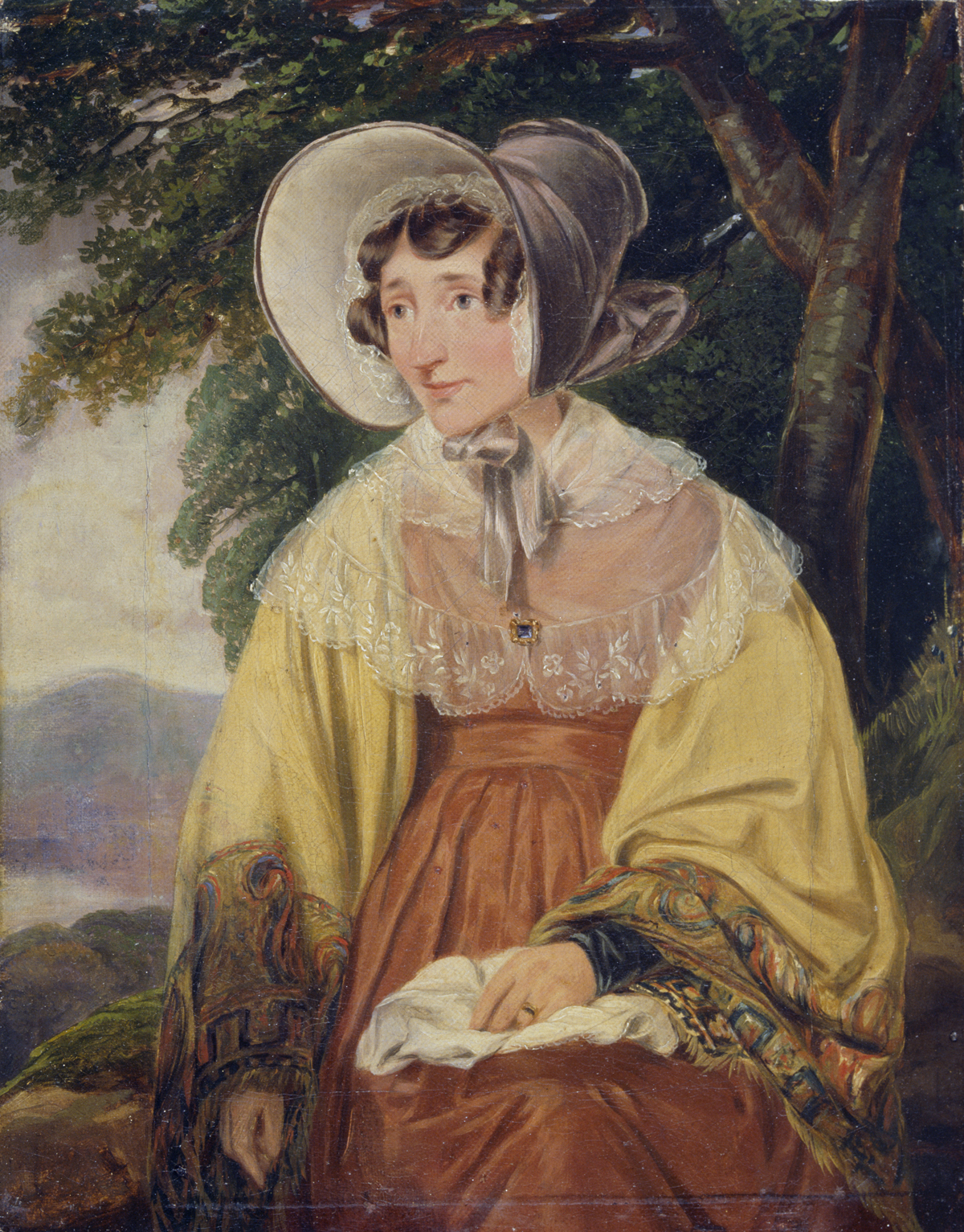
Charlotte Williams-Wynn in c. 1840, by Henry William Pickersgill

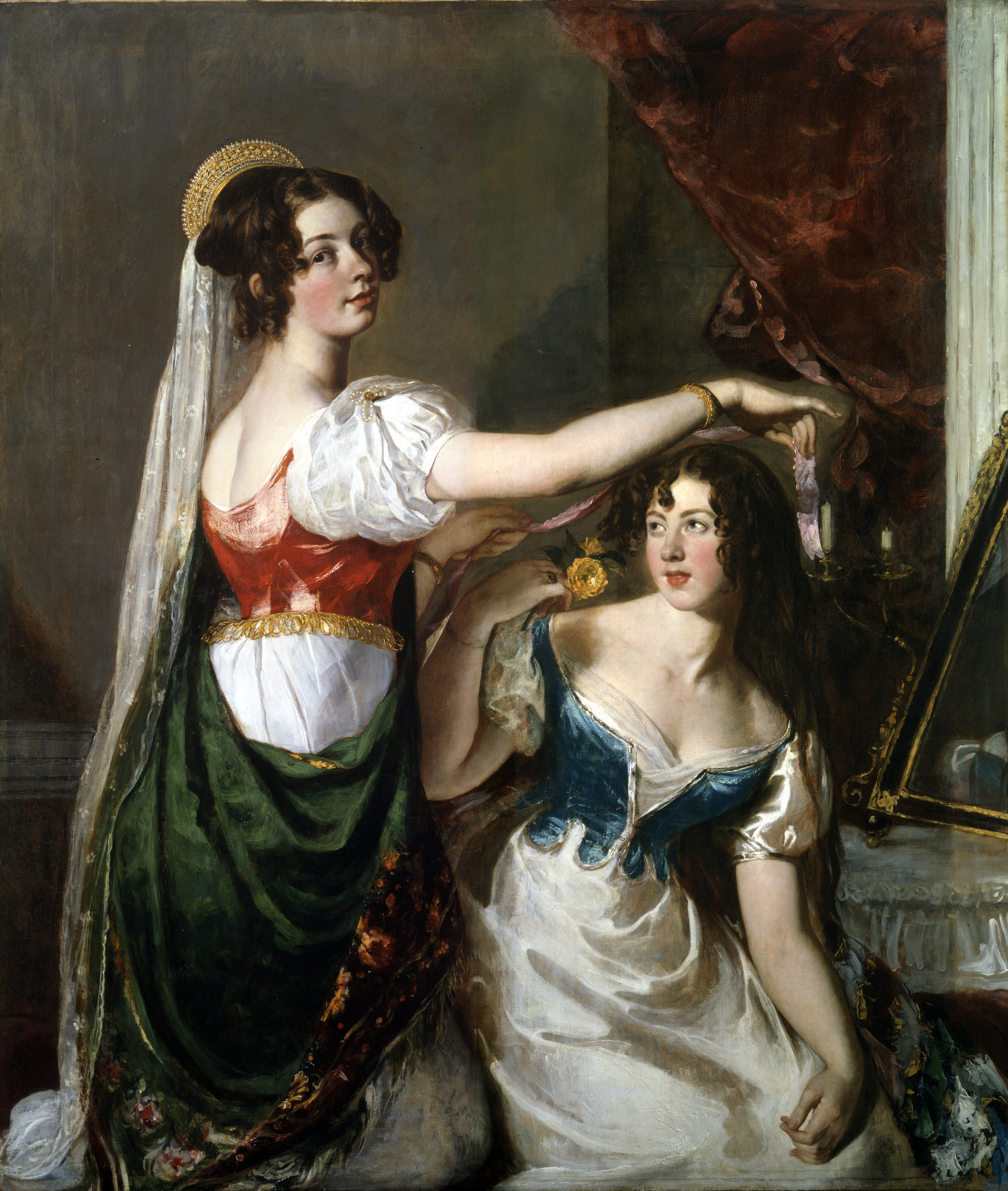
Preparing for a Fancy Dress Ball, 1835. Williams-Wynn places a ribbon and a rose on the head of her younger sister Mary. The painting was commissioned by their father from William Etty in 1833.

Charlotte Williams-Wynn (16 January 1807 – 26 April 1869) was an English letter-writer and diarist.

== Life and career ==
Williams-Wynn was the eldest daughter of the politician Charles Williams-Wynn and his wife Mary, daughter of Sir Foster Cunliffe, 3rd Baronet. She was named after paternal grandmother, Charlotte Williams-Wynn (née Grenville). She spent her childhood at Dropmore Park, the seat of her granduncle, William Grenville, 1st Baron Grenville. Her father's illness forced him to travel to Wiesbaden, and Williams-Wynn accompanied him. On the way from Rotterdam to Biebrich, she met and befriended the diplomat and soldier Karl August Varnhagen von Ense. Williams-Wynn travelled extensively through what is now Italy, Switzerland and Germany. She was staying in Paris at the time of the French coup of 1851, and recorded the events of the period in detail.

Williams-Wynn never married and lived at 43 Green Street, London. She formed a "close and lasting friendship" with the Prussian ambassador Christian Charles Josias von Bunsen, the writer Thomas Carlyle and the theologian Frederick Denison Maurice. In 1866, her declining health compelled her to search for a milder climate and move to Arcachon, where she died on 26 April 1869, five days after her sister Mary. She is buried in an Arcachon cemetery. Her surviving sister, Harriot Lindesay, published her memoires in 1877.

== Ancestry ==
16. Sir William Williams, 2nd Baronet
8. Sir Watkin Williams-Wynn, 3rd Baronet
17. Jane Thelwall
4. Sir Watkin Williams-Wynn, 4th Baronet
9. Frances Shackerley
2. Charles Williams-Wynn
20. Richard Grenville
10. George Grenville
21. Hester Grenville, 1st Countess Temple
5. Charlotte Grenville
22. Sir William Wyndham, 3rd Baronet
11. Elizabeth Wyndham
23. Lady Catherine Seymour
1. Charlotte Williams-Wynn
24. Foster Cunliffe
12. Sir Robert Cunliffe, 2nd Baronet
25. Margaret Carter
6. Sir Foster Cunliffe, 3rd Baronet
26. Ichabod Wright
13. Mary Wright
27. Elizabeth Wildbore.
3. Mary Cunliffe
28. Sir Francis Kinloch, 3rd Baronet
14. Sir David Kinloch of Gilmerton, 5th Baronet
29. Mary Rocheid
7. Harriet Kinloch
30. Sir Archibald Cockburn
15. Harriet Cockburn
31. Mary Campbell

== See also ==
- Charles Williams-Wynn (1822–1896), her brother
