= Rachel Félix =

French actress

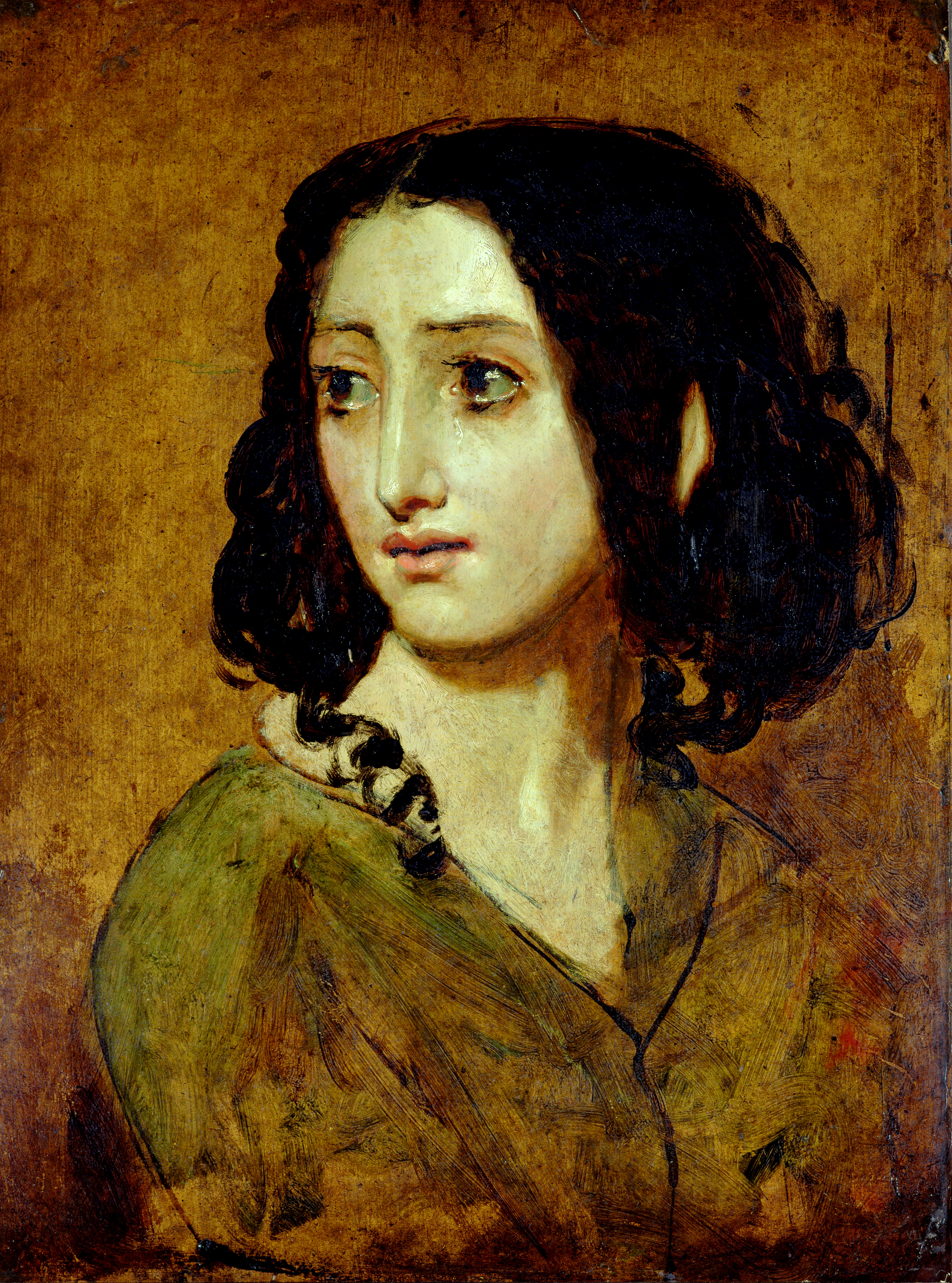
- Portrait of Mlle Rachel by William Etty, 1840s
- Born: Élisabeth Félix; 21 February 1821; Mumpf, Rheinfelden, Aargau, Switzerland
- Died: 3 January 1858 (aged 36); Le Cannet, France
- Children: 2

Élisabeth Félix (21 February 1821 – 3 January 1858), better known only as Mademoiselle or Madame Rachel or simply Rachel, was a French actress. She became a prominent figure in French society, and was the mistress of, among others, Napoleon III and Prince Napoléon, both nephews of Napoleon I, and of Alexandre Colonna-Walewski, the illegitimate son of Napoleon I. Efforts by newspapers to publish pictures of her on her deathbed led to the introduction of privacy rights into French law.

== Biography ==
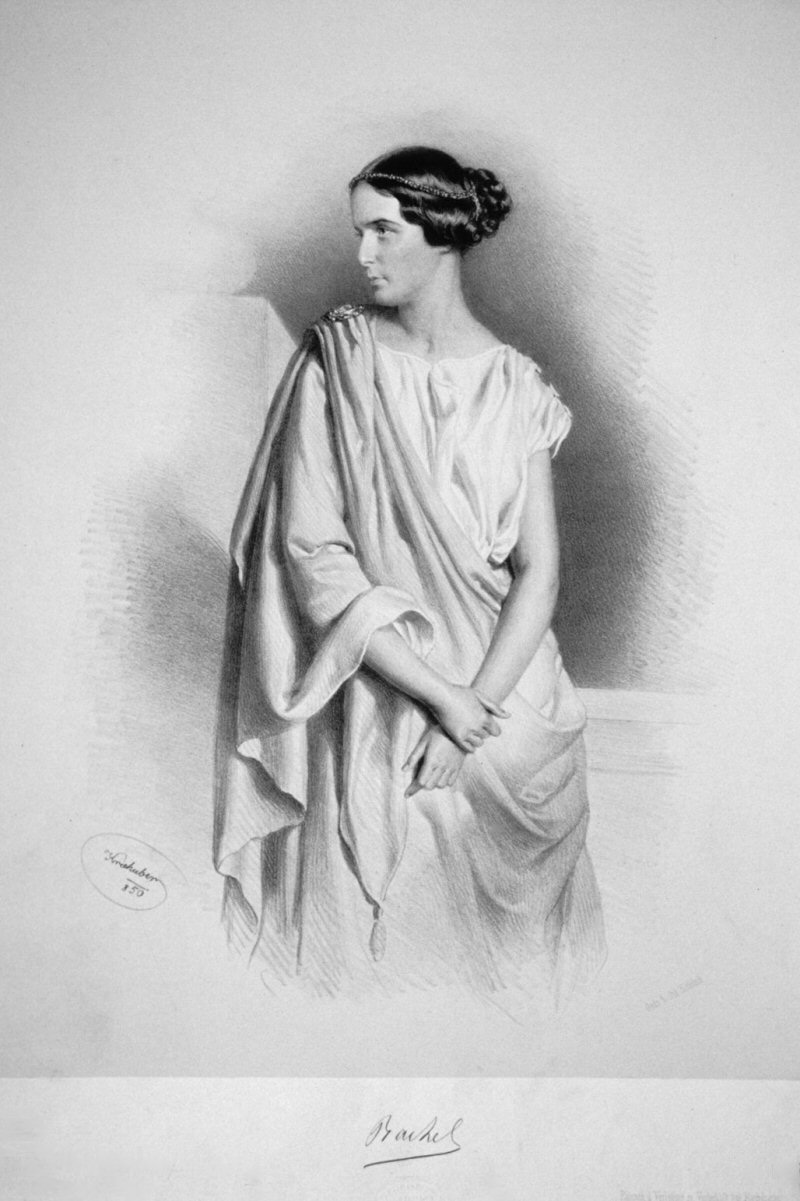
Portrait by Joseph Kriehuber

Rachel Félix was born as Elisa-Rachel Félix on 28 February 1821, in room 13 of the Hotel Sonne in Mumpf, Fricktal, Aargau, to a family of Swiss Jewish background. Her father, Jacob Jacques Félix, was a peddler, and her mother, Esther Thérèse Hayer, was a Bohemian dealer in second-hand clothes. She had four sisters (Sophie-Sarah, Rébecca, Mélanie-Dinah, and Adélaïde "Lia") and one brother, Raphaël.

As a child, Félix earned money singing and reciting in the streets. She arrived in Paris in 1830 intending to become an actress. She took elocution and singing lessons, eventually studying under the instruction of the musician Alexandre-Étienne Choron and Saint-Aulaire. She took dramatic arts classes and debuted in La Vendéenne in January 1837, at the Théâtre du Gymnase. Delestre-Poirson, the director, gave her the stage name Rachel, which she chose to retain in her private life as well.

Rachel was described as a very serious and committed student. She was admired for her intelligence, work ethic, diction, and ability to act. Auditioning in March 1838, she starred in Pierre Corneille's Horace at the Théâtre-Français at the age of 17.

During this time, she began a liaison with Louis Véron, the former director of the Paris Opera, which became the subject of much gossip. During this time, from 1838 to 1842, she lived in a third-floor apartment in Paris's Galerie Véro-Dodat.

Her fame spread throughout Europe after success in London in 1841, and she was often associated with the works of Racine, Voltaire, and Corneille. She toured Brussels, Berlin, and St. Petersburg.

Although French classical tragedy was no longer popular at the time Rachel entered the stage of the Comédie-Française, she remained true to her classical roots, arousing in audiences a craving for the tragic style of writers like Corneille, Racine and Molière.

She created the title role in Eugène Scribe's Adrienne Lecouvreur. Her acting style was characterized by clear diction and economy of gesture; she evoked a high demand for classical tragedy to remain on the stage. This represented a major change from the exaggerated style of those days, as society was beginning to demand the highly emotional, realistic, instinctual acting styles of the Romantics. Félix completely rejected the Romantic Drama movement happening in nineteenth-century France. She was best known for her portrayal of the title role in Phèdre.

== Death ==
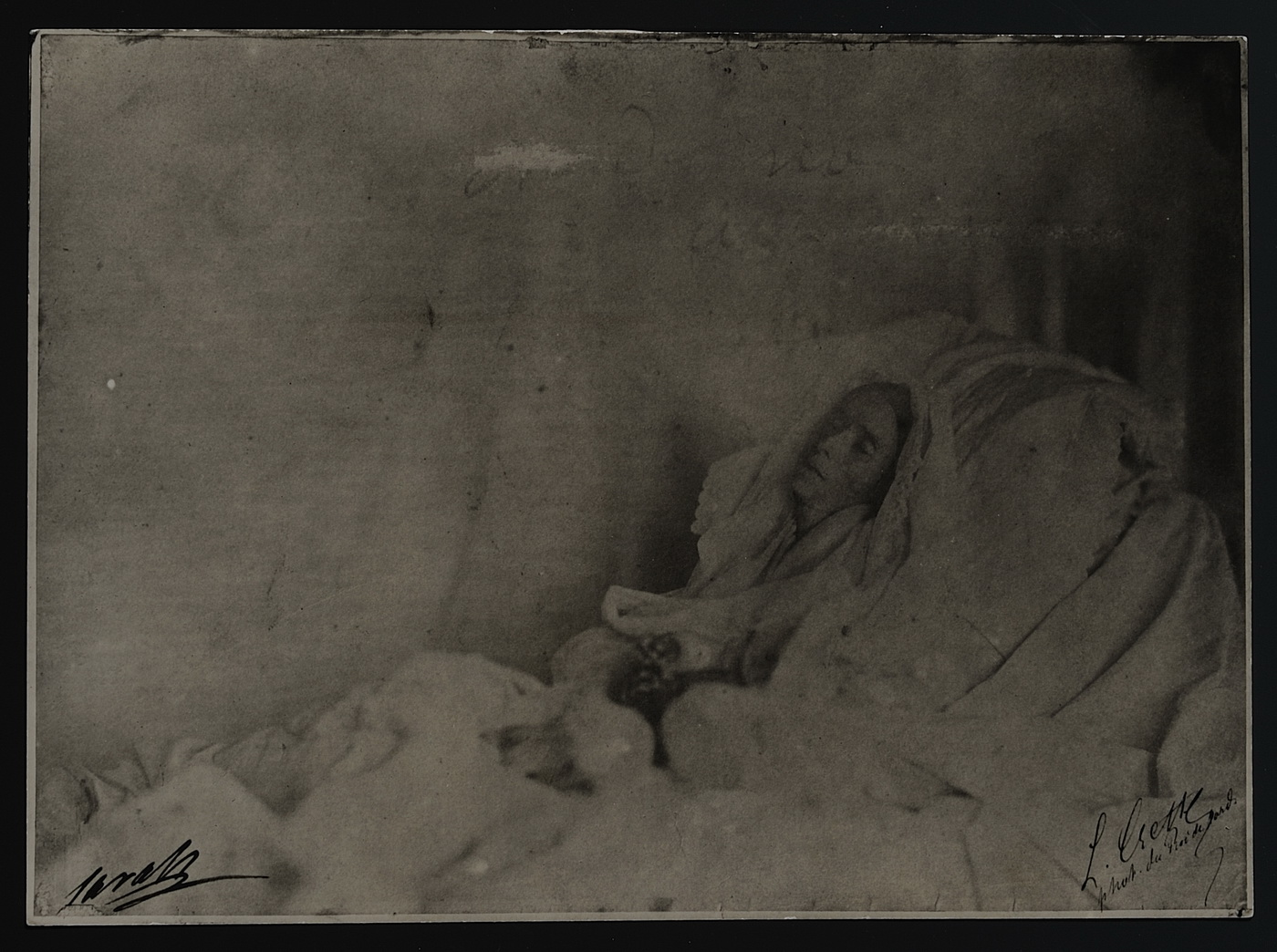
Rachel Félix on her deathbed, 1858

Félix's health declined after a long tour of Russia. Her efforts to remain successful and the constant flux of her relationships had weakened her. She had shown symptoms of tuberculosis as early as 1841, and died early in 1858 of the disease, aged 36, in Le Cannet, Alpes-Maritimes, France. She is interred at Père-Lachaise cemetery in Paris.

== Legacy ==
Félix had two illegitimate sons; Alexandre-Antoine-Jean Colonna-Walewski with Count Alexandre Colonna-Walewski (illegitimate son of Napoleon I and Marie Walewska), and Gabriel-Victor Bertrand with Arthur Bertrand (son of Henri Gatien Bertrand).

Upon her deathbed, she wrote many farewell letters to her sons, family members, lovers, colleagues and theatre connections at Comédie-Française. She is buried in a mausoleum in the Jewish part of Père Lachaise Cemetery and Avenue Rachel in Paris was named after her.

The English theatre critic James Agate published a biography of her in 1928.

A modern account of her life and legacy by Rachel Brownstein was published in 1995.

The character "Vashti" in Charlotte Brontë's novel Villette was reportedly based on Félix, whom Brontë had seen perform in London.

Rachel, a light tannish colour, primarily for face-powder used in artificial light, is named after her. The Raschel lace-making machine was also named after her.

== Chronological repertoire ==
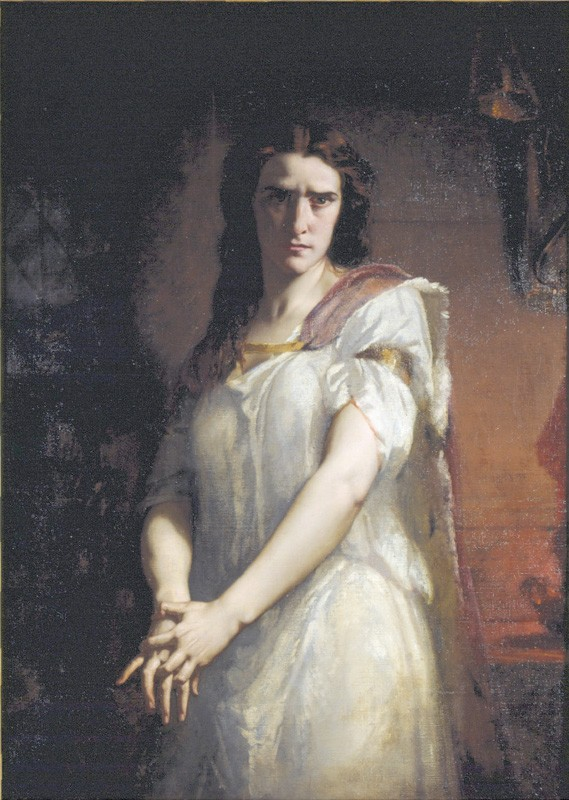
Rachel in Lady Macbeth (1849), Charles Louis Müller – Musée d'Art et d'Histoire du Judaïsme

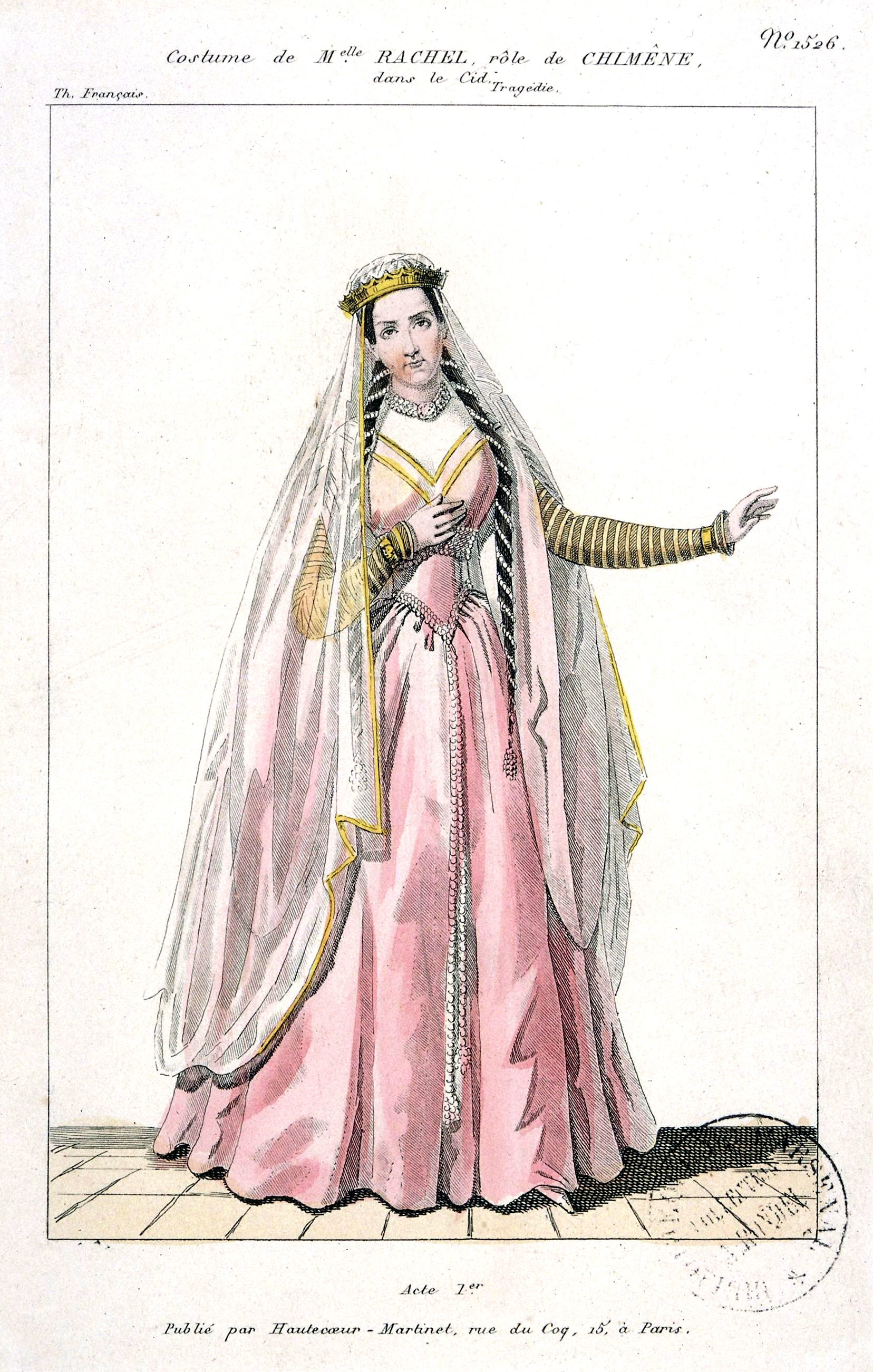
Rachel as Chimène in Le Cid by Corneille

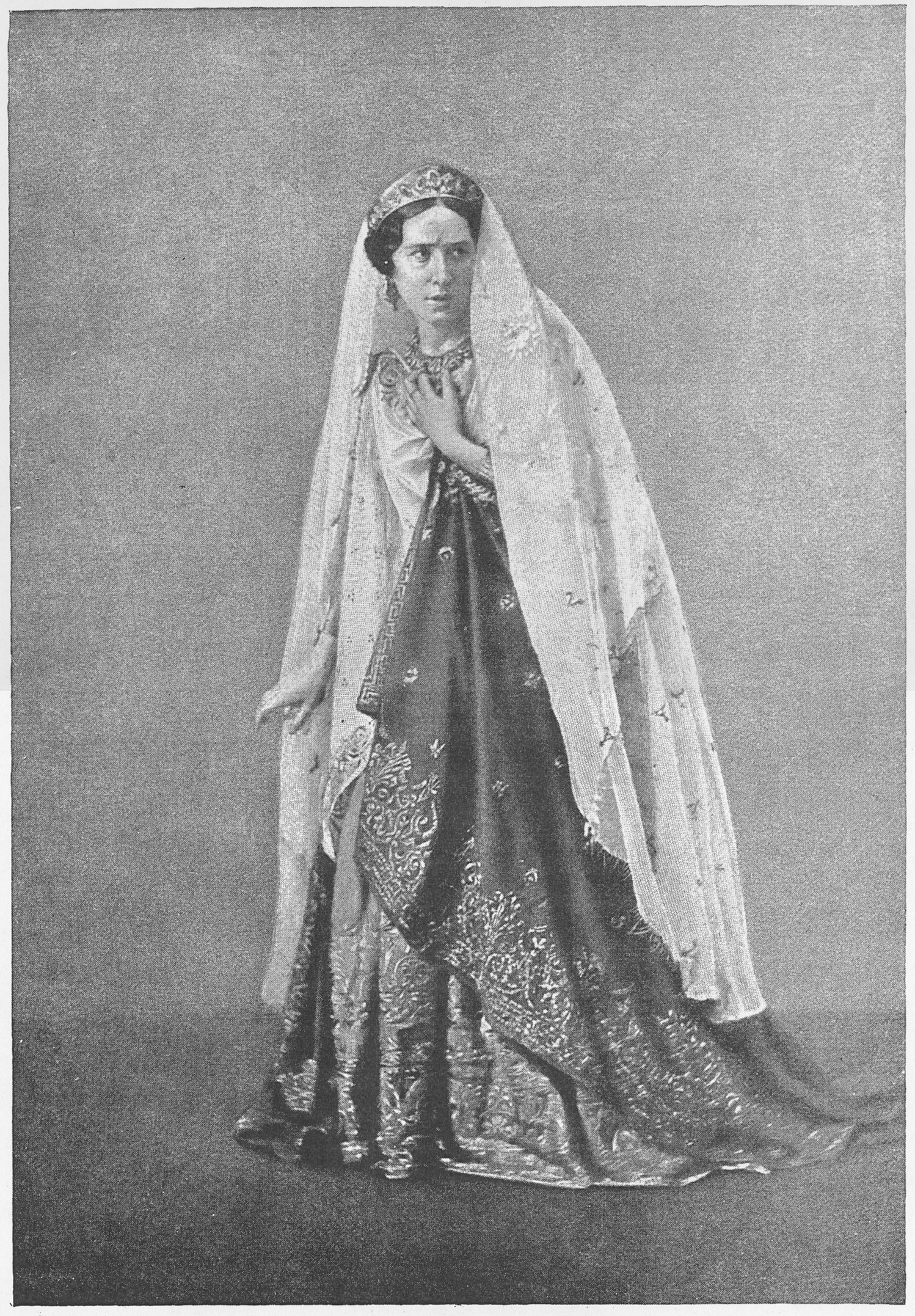
Rachel as Racine's Phèdre

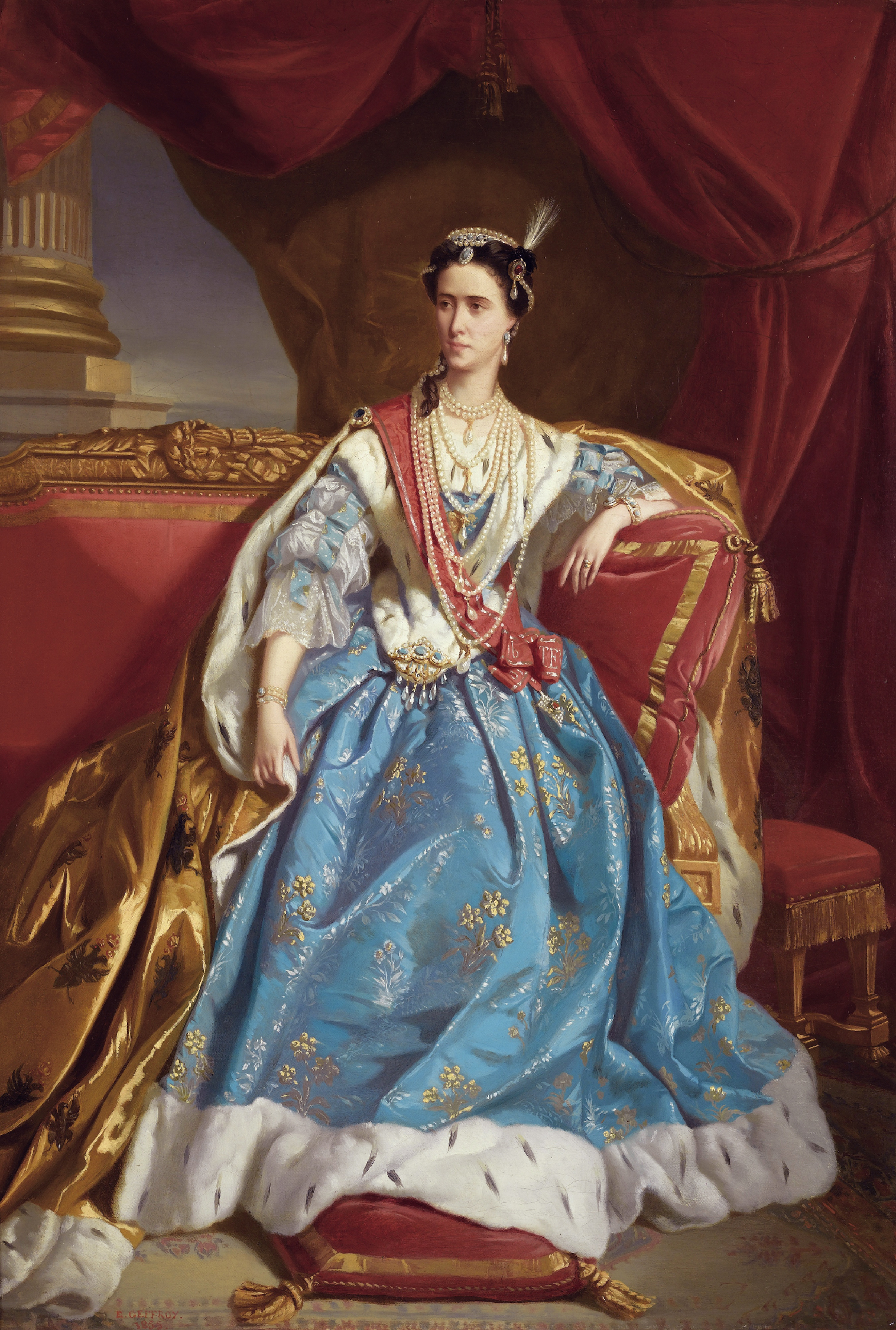
Rachel (1855) by Edmond-Aimé-Florentin Geffroy

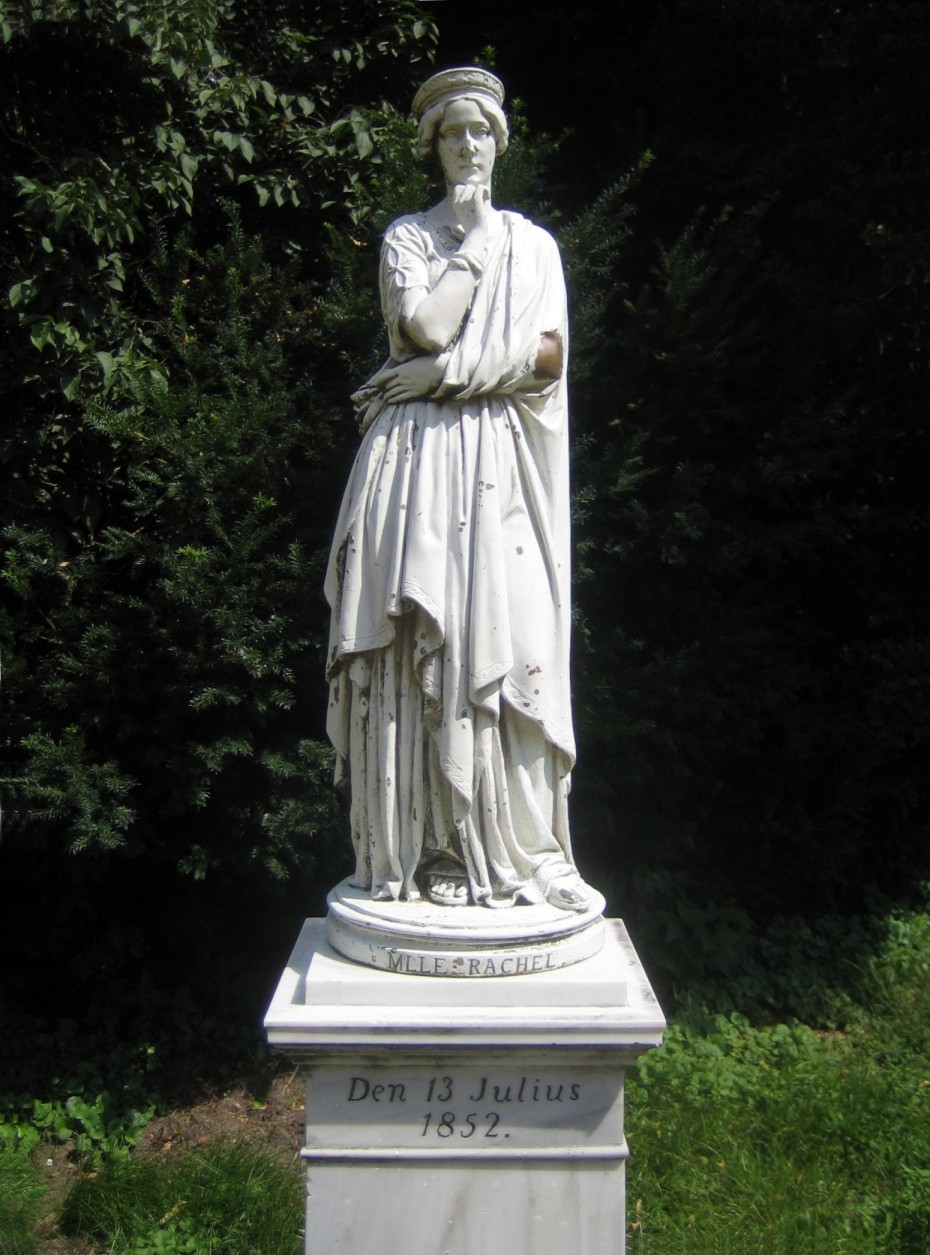
Sculpture of Rachel in Berlin's Pfaueninsel

- 1837:
  - La Vendéenne by Paul Duport (Théâtre du Gymnase, 24 April)
  - Le Mariage de raison by Scribe et Varner (Théâtre du Gymnase, 12 June)

At the Théâtre Français:

- 1838:
  - Camille in Horace by Corneille (12 June to 11 September)
  - Émilie in Cinna by Corneille (27 September)
  - Hermione in Andromaque by Racine (4 September)
  - Aménaïde in Tancrède by Voltaire
  - Ériphile in Iphigénie en Aulide by Racine
  - Monime in Mithridate by Racine
  - Roxane in Bajazet by Racine (23 November)
- 1839:
  - Esther in Esther by Racine (29 February)
  - Laodice in Nicomède by Corneille (9 April)
  - Dorine in Tartuffe by Molière (30 April)
- 1840:
  - Pauline in Polyeucte Martyr by Corneille (15 May)
  - First tour in France during the summer (Rouen, Le Havre, Lyon)
  - The title role of Marie Stuart by Lebrun (22 December)
- 1841:
  - Toured in Belgium and England (summer)
- 1842:
  - Chimène in Le Cid by Corneille (19 January)
  - The title role of Ariane by Thomas Corneille (7 May)
  - Toured in England and Belgium (summer)
  - Frédégonde in Frédégonde et Brunehaut by Lemercier (5 November)
- 1843:
  - The title role of Phèdre by Racine (21 January)
  - The title role of Judith by Girardin (24 January)
  - Toured in Rouen, Marseille and Lyon (summer)
- 1844:
  - The title role of Bérénice by Racine (6 January)
  - Isabelle in Don Sanche d'Aragon by Corneille (17 January)
  - The title role of Catherine II by Romand (25 May)
  - Marinette in Le Dépit amoureux by Molière (1 July)
  - Toured in Belgium (summer)
  - Birth of her son Alexandre in Marly-le-Roi (3 November)
- 1845:
  - Virginie in Brest (3 July)
  - Polyeucte in Nancy (25 August)
- 1846:
  - Toured in the Netherlands, in Liège and in Lille (June)
  - Toured in London (July–August)
- 1847:
  - La Muse sérieuse in L'Ombre by Molière (15 January)
  - Fatine in Le Vieux by La Montagne (6 February)
  - The title role of Athalie by Racine (5 March)
  - Toured in London, in the Netherlands, and at Liège (May–June)
- 1848:
  - Birth of her second son, Gabriel, at Neuilly-sur-Seine (26 January)
  - Horace (13 March)
  - Toured in Amsterdam (June–October)
  - Britannicus by Racine (October)
- 1849:
  - Andromaque (January)
  - The title role of Le Moineau de Lesbie by Armand Barthet (22 March)
  - The title role of Adrienne Lecouvreur (14 April)
  - Toured in west and southwest France (29 May – 31 August)
- 1850:
  - The title role of Mademoiselle de Belle-Isle by Alexandre Dumas, père(25 January)
  - Thisbé in Angelo by Victor Hugo (18 May)
  - Lydie in Horace et Lydie by François Ponsard (19 June)
  - Toured in London, Hamburg, Berlin, Potsdam, Bremen, Vienna and Munich (July–October)
- 1851:
  - Toured
- 1853:
  - Toured
- 1854:
  - Toured in Warsaw, Saint Petersburg and Moscow (January–April)
- 1855:
  - Toured in New York and in the United States (September–December)
  - The troupe separated in Cuba in December

== Bibliography ==
Note: This article relies heavily on the corresponding French Wikipedia article, from which this was partially translated in May 2006.

- Anonymous. Rachel et la Comédie Française. Brussels, 1842.
- de B---, Madame, Memoirs of Rachel. London, 1858.
- Barthou, Louis, Rachel. (Acteurs et Actrices d’Autrefois.). Paris, 1926.
- Brownstein, Rachel, Tragic Muse: Rachel of the Comédie-Française. Duke University Press, 1995.
- Coquatrix, Emile, Rachel à Rouen. Rouen, 1840.
- Faucigny-Lucinge, Rachel et son Temps. Paris, 1910.
- Fleischmann, Hector, Rachel Intime: d’après ses lettres d’amour et des documents nouveau. Paris, 1910.
- Gautier, Théophile, L’Art Dramatique en France depuis vingt-cinq ans. Six Volumes. Paris, 1859.
- Gribble, Francis H., Rachel: her Stage Life and her Real Life. London, 1911.
- d’Heylli, Georges, Journal Intime de la Comédie Française (1852–1871). Paris, 1878.
- d’Heylli, Georges, Rachel d’Après sa Correspondance. Paris, 1882.
- d’Heylli, Georges, Rachel et la Ristori. Paris, 1902.
- Houssaye, Arsène, Les Confessions: souvenirs d’un demi-siècle. Four Volumes. Paris, 1885.
- Janin, Jules, Rachel et la Tragédie. Paris, 1861.
- Kennard, Mrs. Arthur, Rachel. Eminent Women Series. London, 1885.
- Laplane, Gabriel, Rachel: lettres inédites. Paris, 1947.
- Louvet, A., Mademoiselle Rachel: Etude sur l’Art Dramatique. Paris, 1892.
- Martin, Sir Theodore, K.C.B., Monographs: Garrick, Macready, Rachel, etc.. London, 1906.
- Maurice, Charles, Histoire Anecdotique du Theâtre. Paris, 1856.
- Maurice, Charles. La Vérité-Rachel: examen du talent de la première tragédienne du Théâtre Français. Paris, 1850.
- de Musset, Alfred, Un Souper chez Mademoiselle Rachel– Oeuvres Poshumes. 1839.
- de Saint Amand, Imbert, Madame de Girardin [Delphine Gay], avec des lettres inédites de Lamarine, Châteaubrieand, Mlle Rachel. Paris, 1876
- Samson, M. Joseph Isidore, Rachel et Samson: souvenirs de thèâtre. Paris, 1898.
- Thomson, Valentine, La Vie Sentimentale de Rachel d’aprè des lettres inédites. Paris, 1900.
- Veron, Louis, Mémoires d’un Bourgeois de Paris. Five Volumes. Paris, 1856
- Wood, James, ed. (1907). "Rachel, Eliza" . The Nuttall Encyclopædia. London and New York: Frederick Warne.
- Agate, James. Rachel. London: Gerald Howe 1928; NY: Viking Press 1928; reprint Bronx: Benjamin Bloom, Inc., 1969.
- Brownstein, Rachel M. Tragic Muse. New York: Alfred A. Knopf, 1993.
- Forman, Edward. Historical Dictionary of French Theatre. Lanham: The Scarecrow Press, Inc. 2010.
- Gribble, Francis. Rachel. New York: Benjamin Bloom Inc., 1972.
- Richardson, Joanna. Rachel. London, Max Reinhardt, 1956.
