= François Ponsard =

French dramatist, poet and author

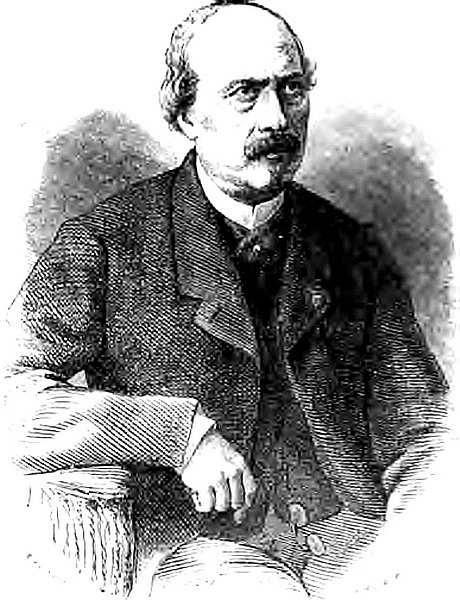
François Ponsard

François Ponsard (1 June 1814 – 7 July 1867) was a French dramatist, poet and author and was a member of the Académie française.

== Biography ==
Ponsard was born at Vienne, Isère in 1814 and trained as a lawyer. His first literary work was a translation of Lord Byron's Manfred (1837). His play, Lucrèce, was first performed at the Thêatre Français on 1 April 1843. This date is notable in literature and dramatic history, because it marked a reaction against the romantic style of Alexandre Dumas, père and Victor Hugo. Ponsard adopted the liberty of the romantics with regard to the unities of time and place, but reverted to the more sober style of earlier French drama. The tastes and capacities of the greatest tragic actress of the day, Rachel, suited his methods, and this contributed greatly to his own popularity. In 1848, Lucrèce was adapted by Sir Anthony Rumbold as Lucretia. In Rumbold's version, Tullia's ghost visits Tarquin prior to the announcement of her death during the play's denouement.

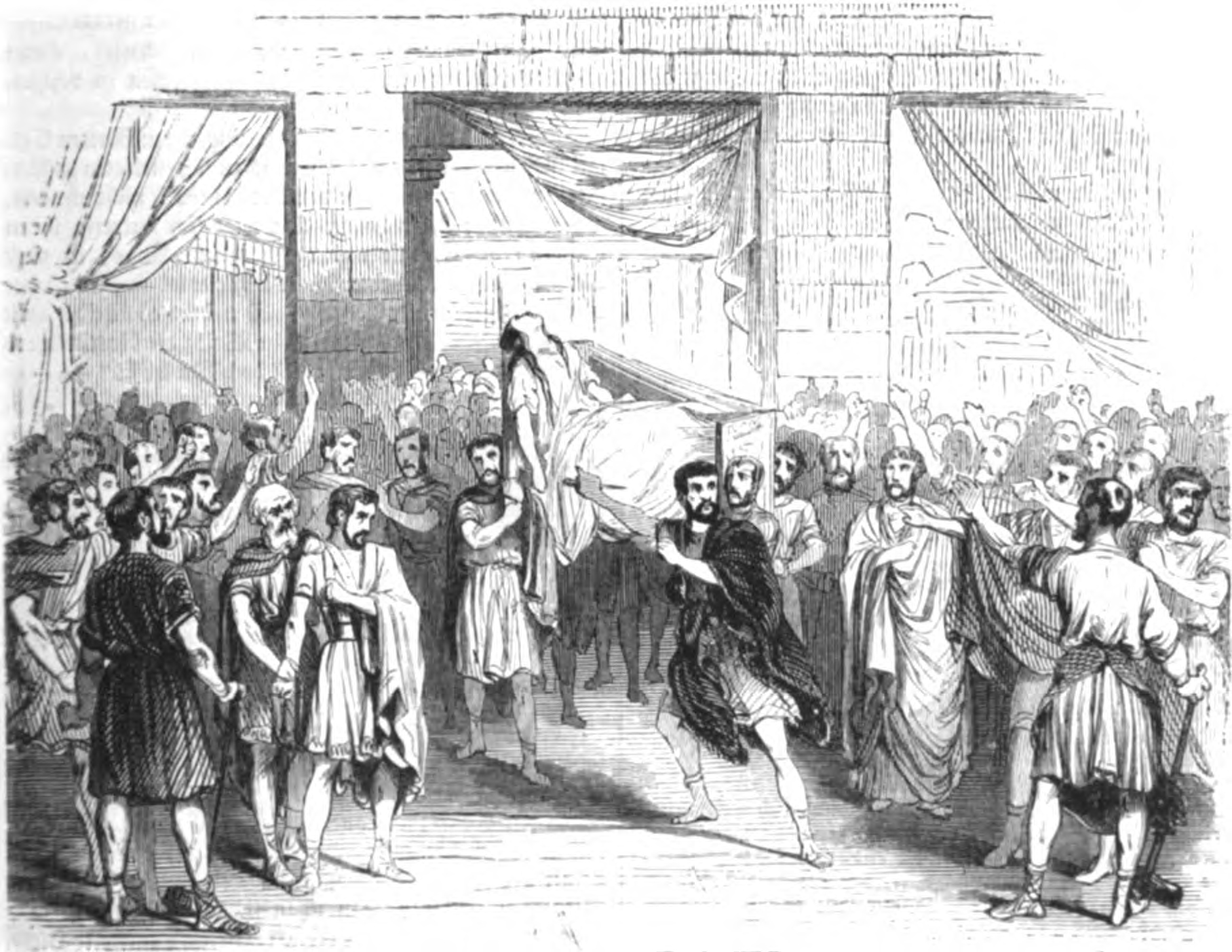
Last scene of Lucrèce (1843)

He followed up Lucrèce with Agnès de Méranie (1846), Charlotte Corday (1850), and others. Ponsard accepted the Second French Empire with no very great enthusiasm, and was given the post of librarian to the senate; he soon resigned, and fought a bloodless duel with a journalist on the subject. L'Honneur et l'argent, one of his most successful plays, was acted in 1853, and he became an Academician in 1855. For some years he was inactive, but in 1866 he repeated his earlier success with Le Lion amoureux, another play dealing with the revolutionary epoch.

His Galilée, which "excited great opposition in the clerical camp", was produced early in 1867. The play was essentially a romance drawn very loosely from the life of Galileo Galilei, the great 17th-century Italian physicist and astronomer who was forced to recant his work by the Roman Inquisition. It was a "hit with the public", but universally panned by critics as a "trite drama of human emotions".

His Œuvres completes were published in Paris (3 vols., 1865–1876).

== Death ==
Ponsard died in Paris in 1867, soon after his nomination to the commandership of the Legion of Honour.

== Place in French literature ==
Most of Ponsard's plays hold a certain steady level of literary and dramatic ability, but his popularity is in the main because his appearance coincided with a certain public weariness of the extravagant and unequal style of 1830.

== Awards and honours ==
In 1845, Ponsard received the prize awarded by the Académie française for a tragedy "to oppose a dike to the waves of romanticism."

In 1855 Ponsard became a member of the Académie française.
