= Sir Foster Cunliffe, 3rd Baronet =

British Baronet

Sir Foster Cunliffe, 3rd Baronet (1755–1834) was a British landowner and the founder of the sporting club, the Royal British Bowmen.

== Biography ==
Foster Cunliffe was the son of Sir Robert Cunliffe, 2nd Baronet and Mary Wright. He succeeded to his father's baronetcy on the latter's death in 1778.

Sir Foster Cunliffe was uneasy about this because he seems to have concealed the origin of the fortune, omitting the word 'slavery' in a detailed history of his family's genealogy. His grandfather, Foster Cunliffe (1682–1758), made the money by becoming the main slave trader in Liverpool and mayor on three occasions. His son was MP for Liverpool in 1755–67.

Sir Foster Cunliffe moved from Saighton, near Chester, to the Acton Park estate near Wrexham, Denbighshire, adding to the existing house, including adding the lavish Four Dogs gateway into the estate - all that remains of the original buildings to this day. He served as High Sheriff of Denbighshire for 1787.

He also enlarged and improved Pant-yr-ochain once the main house in Gresford, now a well known gastro pub. The father of 11 bought the building as a home for two of his unmarried daughters, Charlotte & Emma, to take up residence. The sisters were known to hold great parties and to entertain the local gentry. These included Charles Williams-Wynn, their brother-in-law, and the Glynne family of Hawarden. Catherine Glynne married William Ewart Gladstone, who was Prime Minister no less than four times, and who was known to have ridden to the sisters' home in Gresford.

In addition to his archery, Sir Foster Cunliffe commanded the part-time Wrexham Yeomanry Cavalry during the Napoleonic Wars.

== Family ==
He married Harriet Kinloch of Gilmerton, a noted singer, the daughter of Sir David Kinloch, 5th Baronet.

== Archery ==
One popular pursuit among the gentry was archery. In fact, Sir Foster Cunliffe and the Williams-Wynns were founders of the Society of British Bowmen, later the Royal Society of British Bowmen, which was formed at Acton Hall in 1787.

A painting of Sir Foster Cunliffe by John Hoppner shows him standing full length in a wooded landscape, wearing an archer's uniform, with green coat, buff yellow breeches and hessian boots. His archer's plumed black hat rests at his feet. A campaign is underway in Wrexham to raise money to buy the painting which was displayed at the Wrexham Art Treasures and Industrial Exhibition of 1876. Apparently, the exhibition was the cultural highpoint of 19th century Wrexham, with paintings by Reynolds, Gainsborough and Lawrence.

== Legacy ==
Before his death, Acton Park was the chief house of Wrexham. The house was rebuilt between 1687–95 and enlarged in 1786-7 when the Foster Cunliffes moved in. The park was created in the 1790s. His son, Sir Robert inherited the house and it was given to his grandson, also Sir Robert. An MP for Flint and then Denbigh, he died in 1905 and was the last of the family to own Acton Hall, which became known locally as Acton Park. By the 1920s descendants had sold the land piecemeal and the hall was demolished in 1954.

Baronetage of Great Britain
Preceded by Robert Cunliffe	Baronet (of Liverpool); 1778–1834	Succeeded by Robert Henry Cunliffe
