= Charles Williams-Wynn (1775–1850) =

British politician (1775–1850)

The Right Honourable Charles Williams-Wynn PC
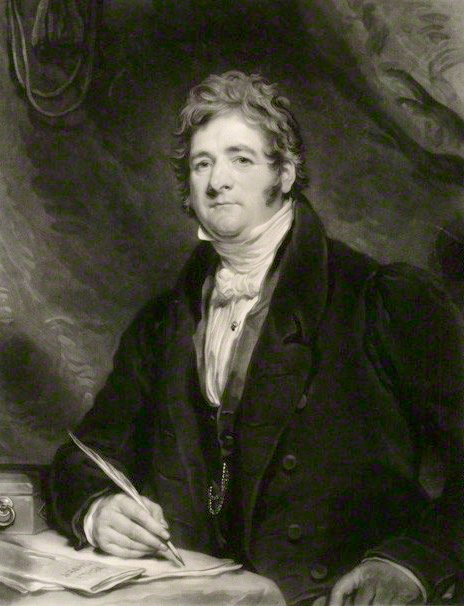
- Portrait of Williams-Wynn, 1835

President of the Board of Control
- In office 1822–1828
- Monarch: George IV
- Prime Minister: The Earl of Liverpool; George Canning; The Viscount Goderich
- Preceded by: Charles Bathurst
- Succeeded by: The Viscount Melville

Secretary at War
- In office 30 November 1830 – 4 April 1831
- Monarch: William IV
- Prime Minister: The Earl Grey
- Preceded by: Lord Francis Leveson-Gower
- Succeeded by: Sir Henry Parnell, Bt

Chancellor of the Duchy of Lancaster
- In office 26 December 1834 – 8 April 1835
- Monarch: William IV
- Prime Minister: Sir Robert Peel, Bt
- Preceded by: The Lord Holland
- Succeeded by: The Lord Holland

Personal details
- Born: 9 October 1775
- Died: 2 September 1850 (aged 74)
- Spouse: Mary Cunliffe
- Children: 7, including Charlotte and Charles
- Parent(s): Sir Watkin Williams-Wynn, 4th Baronet; Charlotte Grenville
- Education: Christ Church, Oxford

Charles Watkin Williams-Wynn PC (9 October 1775 – 2 September 1850) was a British politician of the early- to mid-19th century. He held office in both Tory and Whig governments and was Father of the House of Commons between 1847 and 1850.

== Background and education ==
Born into an ancient and grand Welsh family, Williams-Wynn was the second son of Sir Watkin Williams-Wynn, 4th Baronet, by his second wife Charlotte Grenville, daughter of Prime Minister George Grenville. His great-great-grandfather Sir William Williams, 1st Baronet, served as Speaker of the House of Commons from 1680 to 1685. On his mother's side, he was the nephew of William Wyndham Grenville, 1st Baron Grenville and George Nugent-Temple-Grenville, 1st Marquess of Buckingham and the first cousin of Richard Temple-Grenville, 1st Duke of Buckingham and Chandos. Williams-Wynn was educated privately, at Westminster School and Christ Church, Oxford. He was called to the Bar, Lincoln's Inn, in 1798. At Westminster School Williams-Wynn became acquainted with the poet Robert Southey, whom he later supported financially.

== Political career ==
In 1797 he was elected to parliament for the notorious rotten borough of Old Sarum, where he succeeded Richard Wellesley, 2nd Earl of Mornington. He resigned this seat in 1799, when he was elected for Montgomeryshire, which constituency he would represent for the next 51 years.

During the French Revolutionary War Montgomeryshire had failed to raise a single unit of part-time unit Yeomanry Cavalry or Volunteer Infantry for home defence and internal security duties. After the short-lived Peace of Amiens broke down in 1803, Williams-Wynn overcame the apathy and the county rapidly two formed Troops of Yeomanry cavalry by August 1803. Williams-Wynn took command as Major-Commandant By 2 November this had expanded into a large force, the Montgomeryshire Volunteer Legion. In contemporary terminology a 'Legion' was an all-arms force, and soon after its formation the Montgomeryshire unit comprised three troops of Yeomanry cavalry each 40 strong, and 20 Companies of Volunteer infantry, with Watkins-Wynn as Lieutenant-Colonel-Commandant and commander of the legion's cavalry. The Volunteer Infantry were replaced by the Local Militia in 1808, but the cavalry troops carried on as the Montgomeryshire Yeomanry. These were disbanded in 1828, but in view of the disturbances in north-east Wales Williams-Wynn applied to reform the regiment in 1831. It saw service in 1838–39 during the Chartist riots. Williams-Wynn finally retired from the command in 1844 at the age of 77.

In 1806 he was appointed Under-Secretary of State for the Home Department in the Ministry of All the Talents led by his uncle Lord Grenville. He remained in this post until the government fell the following year. Williams-Wynn was an active member of parliament and considered an authority on the procedure of the House of Commons. This led him to be nominated for the post of Speaker of the House of Commons in 1817. However, he was defeated by Charles Manners-Sutton. During the late 1810s, Williams-Wynn was the leader of a group of MPs that tried to establish a third party in the House of Commons, acting on behalf of his cousin Lord Buckingham. However, the third party never materialised and the group instead joined the Tories.

In January 1822 Williams-Wynn was admitted to the Privy Council and appointed President of the Board of Control, with a seat in the cabinet, in the Tory government of the Earl of Liverpool. He remained in this post also in the governments of George Canning and Lord Goderich. However, when the Duke of Wellington became Prime Minister in 1828, Williams-Wynn was not offered a position in the government.

This drove him into opposition, and when the Whigs came to power in November 1830 under Lord Grey, Williams-Wynn was appointed Secretary at War, although without a seat in the cabinet. He only remained in this post until April of the following year, and held no other position during the three remaining years of the Whig government. In 1834 the Tories returned to office under Sir Robert Peel, and Wynn was appointed Chancellor of the Duchy of Lancaster, but again was not a member of the cabinet. The Peel government fell already in April 1835 and Wynn never held office again. However, he was said to have thrice rejected the post of Governor-General of India. Wynn remained Member of Parliament for Montgomeryshire until his death, and from 1847 to 1850 he was Father of the House of Commons; at the time of his death, he was the final MP from the 18th century still in Parliament.

He was elected as the first president, from 1823 to 1841, of the Royal Asiatic Society of Great Britain and Ireland and as a Fellow of the Royal Society in 1827.

== Family ==
Wynn married Mary Cunliffe, daughter of Sir Foster Cunliffe, 3rd Baronet and Harriet Kinloch, in 1806. They had seven children, two sons and five daughters. His eldest daughter Charlotte Williams-Wynn was a well-known diarist; his son, also named Charles, followed him into Parliament. Williams-Wynn died in September 1850, aged 74.

Parliament of Great Britain
Preceded by George Hardinge; The Earl of Mornington	Member of Parliament for Old Sarum; 1797–1799; With: George Hardinge	Succeeded by George Hardinge; Sir George Yonge, Bt
Parliament of Great Britain
Preceded by Francis Lloyd	Member of Parliament for Montgomeryshire; 1799–1800	Parliament of the United Kingdom
Parliament of the United Kingdom
Preceded by Parliament of Great Britain	Member of Parliament for Montgomeryshire; 1801–1850	Succeeded by Herbert Watkin Williams-Wynn
Preceded by George Byng	Father of the House; 1847–1850	Succeeded by George Harcourt
Political offices
Preceded by J. H. Smyth	Under-Secretary of State for the Home Department; 1806–1807	Succeeded by Hon. Charles Jenkinson
Preceded by Charles Bathurst	President of the Board of Control; 1822–1828	Succeeded by The Viscount Melville
Preceded by Lord Francis Leveson-Gower	Secretary at War; 1830–1831	Succeeded by Sir Henry Parnell, Bt
Preceded by The Lord Holland	Chancellor of the Duchy of Lancaster; 1834–1835	Succeeded by The Lord Holland
